= 2015 Macedonian protests =

- Part of '2015-16 Macedonian political crisis' and Protests against democratic backsliding
- Date: 4 May — 19 June 2015
- Location: Mostly in Skopje, Macedonia, and in some other parts of the country such as Bitola, Kumanovo, Ohrid and Prilep
- Caused by: Wiretapping involving Prime Minister Nikola Gruevski; Clues for corruption scandals involving ministers, mayors and other persons; Police brutality
- Goals: Force Prime Minister Gruevski and his cabinet to resign
- Result: Several ministers resigned during the protests; Pržino Agreement; Early general elections on 05 June 2016; New transitional (technical) government with SDSM ministers from 15 October 2015; Resignation from Nikola Gruevski in January 2016

Parties
(North Macedonia) United democratic opposition of Macedonia, opposition/anti-government supporters and non-government organizations: Social Democratic Union of Macedonia; New Social Democratic Party; Liberal Party of Macedonia; Liberal Democratic Party; National Democratic Revival; Democratic Renewal of Macedonia; Democratic Union; Party for the Full Emancipation of the Roma of Macedonia; Party for a European Future; Party for Democratic Prosperity; Lëvizja Besa; Non-governmental organizations; Supported by: Party of European Socialists; Alliance of Liberals and Democrats for Europe Party; Party of the European Left	(North Macedonia) Macedonian Government: Macedonian Police; VMRO-DPMNE; Youth Force Union of the VMRO-DPMNE; Pro-government counterprotestors

Lead figures
(North Macedonia) Zoran Zaev (opposition leader) (North Macedonia) Radmila Šekerinska (North Macedonia) Stevo Pendarovski (North Macedonia) Tito Petkovski (North Macedonia) Oliver Spasovski (North Macedonia) Andrej Žernovski	(North Macedonia) Nikola Gruevski (Prime Minister of Macedonia) (North Macedonia) Saso Mijalkov (North Macedonia) Gordana Jankulovska

Number
May 5: Around 5,000 protesters (in Skopje); May 6: 15,000 Anti-government demonstrators (in Skopje) May 7: 10,000 Anti-government demonstrators (in Skopje) May 17: 70,000-110,000	Unknown number of police officers May 18: 30,000—70,000 government supporters

Casualties and losses
May 5: At least 19 protestors injured	May 5: Between 10—38 policemen injured

In May 2015, protests occurred in Skopje, Republic of Macedonia, against the incumbent Prime Minister Nikola Gruevski and his government. Protests began following charges being brought up against Zoran Zaev, the Social Democratic opposition leader, who responded by alleging that Gruevski had 20,000 Macedonian officials and other figures wiretapped, and covered up the murder of a young man by a police officer in 2011. A protest with up to 2,000 attendees occurred on May 5, seeing clashes between activists and police.

Several ministers, including the interior minister, resigned during the protests. Gruevski himself refused to step down, saying on May 16 that "if I back down it would be a cowardly move. I’ll face down the attacks.”

Protests continued through the month, and a large gathering of anti-government protestors was held in Skopje on May 17. The number of protesters that turned up on Sunday, May 17 is estimated in the tens of thousands (40,000+). Zaev claimed that the number of attendees at the rally on Sunday was more than 100,000 (between 100,000 and 120,000). On May 18, a large pro-government rally occurred of Gruevski's supporters, said to be in the tens of thousands. Estimates put pro-government supporters at around 30,000. On May 19, Gruevski and Zaev met for talks, with several members of the European Parliament also present, in Strasbourg. The negotiations lasted for twelve hours but resulted in no agreements. On his return flight to Macedonia, Gruevski's plane made an emergency landing in Zürich after decompression in the air occurred.

== Background ==
Events escalated after the April 2014 general election, in which Nikola Gruevski and his ruling party defeated Zoran Zaev and his Social Democratic Union of Macedonia. Zaev stated that SDSM would not recognize the elections as legitimate and claimed that the government abused the system. Later, the government accused Zaev of planning a coup on January 31, 2015, and conspiring with a foreign intelligence service. They claimed that they obtained documents in which he conspired with the British ambassador. He responded by releasing information which alleged that Gruevski had 20,000 Macedonian citizens wiretapped and covered up the murder of a young man after the election in 2011, amongst other claims. The beginning of the protest further set back Macedonia on its path of joining the European Union, which it has been attempting to do since 2005.

== Student and high school protests ==
On 10 October 2014, thousands of students took to the streets against a government plan to replace university-run examinations with state 'testing', accusing the government of infringing the autonomy of the country's universities. Similar protests also happened on 17 November and 10 and 25 December 2014. Academics supported the students' claims and Students Plenum, an ad hoc organizing committee, denied government claims that Zaev's opposition Social Democrats were behind the protests. High school pupils have also protested against the changes on 19 March, 1 April, 6 May and 7 June 2015, and boycotted the classes in April and May 2015.

== The event ==
=== Initial protests ===
Between 5,000—6,000 people showed up in a protest in Skopje on Tuesday, 5 May 2015. Protestors demanded the resignation of Prime Minister Gruevski and his cabinet. Police responded by clearing out the protest with tear gas. A number of police officers were injured, with conflicting reports putting the figure between 10—38. At least 19 protestors were injured. Protests continued across the country, and a skirmish occurred on May 9 in the town of Kumanovo, northwestern Macedonia, between Albanian militants and Macedonian police. The skirmish resulted in several deaths. On May 16, the government prepared for more actions as protests continued. Gruevski stated to the pro-government Sitel TV on Saturday that "if I back down it would be a cowardly move. I’ll face down the attacks.”

=== May 17 ===
Large crowds gathered to protest on May 17, demanding the resignation of Prime Minister Gruevski, who refused and said a rally of supporters will occur on May 18. The number of protesters was estimated to be in the tens of thousands, more than 30,000. Zaev claimed that the protesters numbered 50,000, and said that some of them would remain there for days until Gruevski resigns. European Union diplomats offered to mediate a solution to the crisis.

=== Counter-protest ===
Later, tens of thousands appeared on the streets on Monday, May 18, at a pro-government rally. The total count of pro-government supporters was estimated to be between 30,000 and 70,000. The rally appeared to be peaceful and no clashes occurred between the two.

=== Negotiations ===
Gruevski and Zaev met in Strasbourg for talks on May 19, held for about twelve hours, along with several members of the European Parliament. They made no progress, and a new meeting was scheduled for a later date. Gruevski (VMRO-DPMNE), Zaev (SDSM), Ahmeti (DUI) and Thaci (DPA) met on 2 June in Skopje mediated by the Commissioner for European Neighbourhood Policy & Enlargement Negotiations Johannes Hahn. Early general elections in April 2016 were announced.

== Aftermath ==
=== Reactions ===
==== Domestic ====
Three government officials, two ministers and the intelligence chief, resigned during the protests. Those three included Interior Minister Gordana Jankuloska, Transport Minister Mile Janakieski and intelligence chief Saso Mijalkov, who is also the Prime Minister's cousin. In his resignation letter, Mijalkov said that he hoped it would "help in overcoming the political crisis imposed by the opposition". Gruevski refused to step down, and said on May 16, "if I back down it would be a cowardly move. I’ll face down the attacks.” Gruevski appeared at the head of a large pro-government rally on May 18 in Skopje, with tens of thousands showing up in support of the government.

The political crisis which began with the wiretapping incident continued into 2016, with Gruevski ultimately resigning and being replaced by Emil Dimitriev as the Prime Minister of Macedonia as a result of the EU-brokered Pržino Agreement. The investigation into Gruevski and other politicians from VMRO-DPMNE was stopped in April 2016 by President Gjorge Ivanov, which resulted in several protests.

==== International ====
- Organization for Security and Co-operation in Europe — The OSCE ambassador in Macedonia, Ralf Breth, expressed concern about the protests. He stated that "the right to peacefully gather and protest is a constitutionally guaranteed right of all citizens in the country. However, such protests should not be marred by violence."
- European Union — Ambassadors of France, Germany, Italy, and the United Kingdom issued a joint statement warning that the inability of Mr Gruevski's government to address the numerous allegations of government wrongdoing threatened to undermine Macedonia's accession to the EU. The European Parliament also offered to host a negotiation in Strasbourg.
- Albania — Edi Rama, the Prime Minister of Albania, stated that his country would block Macedonia's accession to NATO alongside Greece if it does not make further efforts to fulfill the Ohrid Framework Agreement. On May 27, 2015, during a press conference with Serbian prime minister Aleksandar Vucic, Rama denied allegations that he would block Macedonia's accession to NATO, and that his statement had only symbolical meaning.
- Bulgaria — The Prime Minister of Bulgaria, Boyko Borisov, met with Zoran Zaev in Sofia, at the invitation of the Bulgarian Socialist Party. The prime minister stated after the meeting that he was against the federalization of Macedonia.
- Russia — The Russian government blames the events unfolding in Macedonia on foreign influence. Sergey Lavrov, the Minister of Foreign Affairs of Russia, stated on May 19, “we’re very concerned, the Macedonian events are fairly crudely managed from outside. It’s very sad and dangerous that, to undermine Gruevski’s government, the Albanian factor is being applied.”
- United States — The U.S. State Department said it has been following the situation "closely" and spokesman Jeff Rathke stated that "we remain in close consultation with the Macedonian government and with political leaders to convey our concerns about the current political crisis."

== See also ==
- 2016 Macedonian protests "Colorful revolution"
- 2017 storming of Macedonian Parliament
- List of protests in the 21st century
- 2014-15 Macedonian student protests
