= 2016 Macedonian protests =

2016 Macedonian protests Colorful Revolution
- Part of the Macedonian political crisis (2015-17) and Protests against democratic backsliding
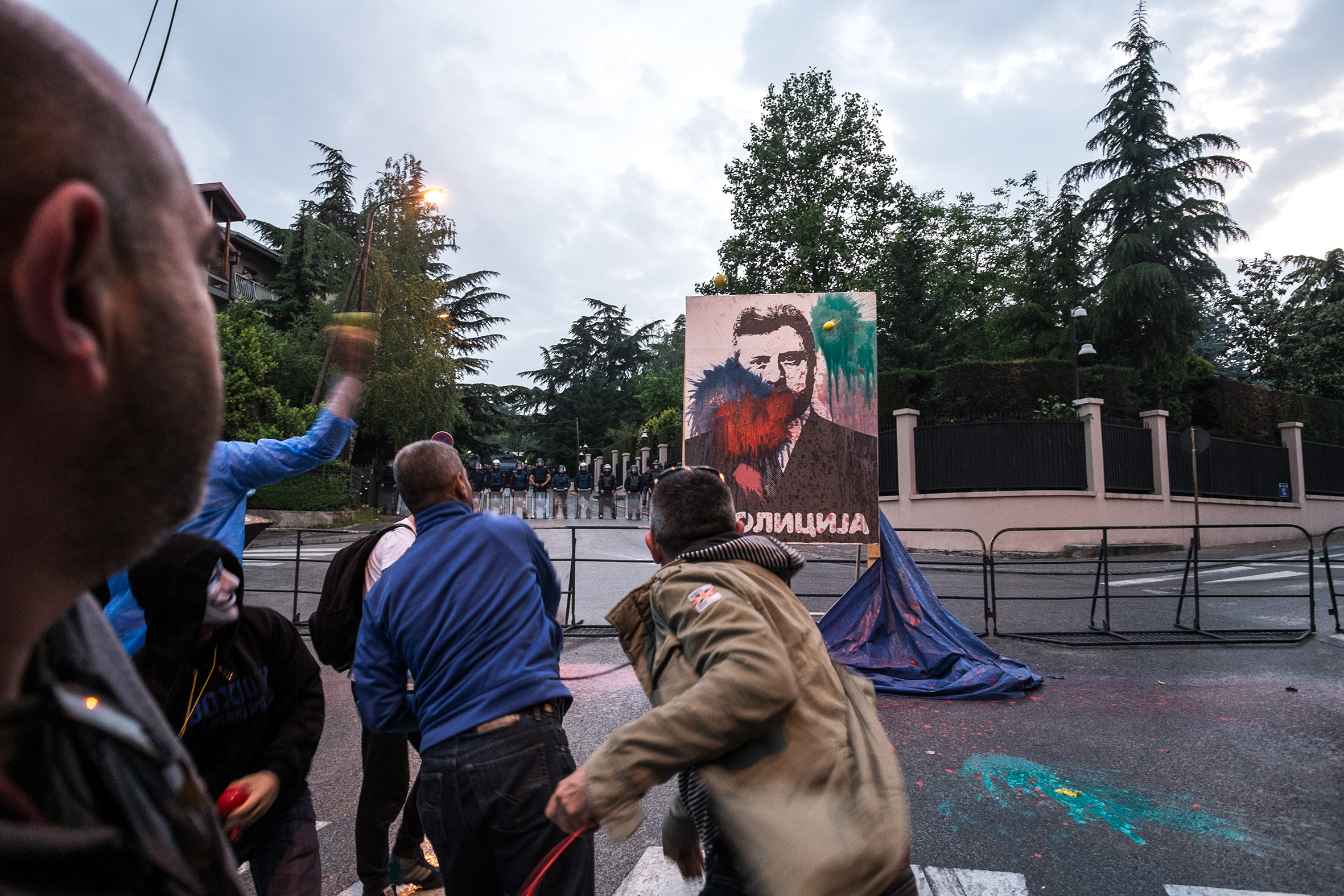
- Date: 12 April 2016 – 20 July 2016
- Location: Mostly in Skopje also in Bitola, Strumica, Kumanovo, Prilep, Kočani, Štip, Tetovo and other cities
- Caused by: Halting of investigation against former Prime Minister Nikola Gruevski and other politicians by President Gjorge Ivanov; Wiretapping scandal involving Gruevski; Police brutality
- Goals: Force President Ivanov, Prime Minister Dimitriev and his cabinet to resign; Form an expert government or national unity government
- Methods: Protests and demonstrations, Internet activism, roadblock, strikes
- Result: Postponed early parliament elections planned for 5 June; initiated proceedings in parliament for impeachment on Gjorge Ivanov by SDSM, NSDP, LDP, DUI, DOM and DS; overturned abolition for dozens of politicians from VMRO-DPMNE by president Ivanov; continuing investigations against former Prime Minister Gruevski and other politicians from VMRO-DPMNE; New transitional (technical) government 4 months before elections; planned early parliament elections on 11 December 2016

Parties
(North Macedonia) Government of Macedonia: VMRO-DPMNE; Macedonian Police; Citizens for Macedonian Defense	(North Macedonia) United opposition and NGOs, including: Social Democratic Union of Macedonia; New Social Democratic Party; Liberal Party of Macedonia; Liberal Democratic Party; "Протестирам" (I protest); The Left; Party of European Socialists

Lead figures
(North Macedonia) Gjorge Ivanov (President of Republic of Macedonia) (North Macedonia) Nikola Gruevski (former Prime Minister and leader of VMRO-DPMNE) (North Macedonia) Emil Dimitriev (Interim Prime Minister)	(North Macedonia) Zoran Zaev (President of SDSM and opposition leader) (North Macedonia) Radmila Šekerinska (Deputy leader of SDSM) (North Macedonia) Oliver Spasovski (Minister of Interior) (North Macedonia) Andrej Žernovski (Mayor of municipality of Centar) (North Macedonia) Stevo Pendarovski (former candidate for President of Macedonia) (North Macedonia) Tito Petkovski (Leader of NSDP) (North Macedonia) Zdravko Saveski 'And others...'

In April 2016, protests began in the Republic of Macedonia against the incumbent President Gjorge Ivanov and the government led by the interim Prime Minister Emil Dimitriev from the ruling VMRO-DPMNE party. Known as the Colorful Revolution (Macedonian: Шарена револуција), the protests started after the controversial decision by President Gjorge Ivanov to stop the investigation of former Prime Minister Nikola Gruevski and dozens of politicians who were allegedly involved in a wiretapping scandal. The demonstrations were organized by "Protestiram" (I protest) and supported by a coalition led by the Social Democratic Union of Macedonia and other opposition parties, in addition to the newly formed The Left demanding that the government resign and be replaced by a transitional government and that the parliamentary elections planned for 5 June 2016 be cancelled, on the grounds that the conditions for free and transparent elections were not in place. The government and its supporters, who had organized pro-government rallies, maintained that the elections on June 5 were the only solution to the political crisis. The Russian Ministry of Foreign Affairs and Aleksandar Vučić accused the opposition of creating a "Ukraine scenario" in Macedonia.

Initially taking place in Skopje, the capital, both anti- and pro-government protests also occurred in other cities in the country, including Bitola, Kicevo, Kočani, Veles, Strumica, Prilep, Kumanovo and Tetovo. Thousands of people took part in the demonstrations. The European Union and the United States criticized the government of Macedonia for the pardon of the politicians and stated that Macedonia's prospects of becoming a member of the EU and NATO were under threat because of it. In an official statement, the Ministry of Foreign Affairs of Russia labelled the Macedonian opposition as a tool of foreign powers being used to destabilize the political situation in the country.

== Background ==
Large protests occurred in May 2015 in the Republic of Macedonia against the government of Prime Minister of Macedonia, Nikola Gruevski, following the publication of information by opposition leader Zoran Zaev that suggested Gruevski had thousands of Macedonian citizens wiretapped. Many people protested against alleged government corruption, with estimates putting the number of demonstrators in the tens of thousands, demanding the resignation of the Prime Minister. Pro-government rallies occurred as well, which also had tens of thousands attendees. An agreement, brokered by the European Union and the United States, was worked on in June and July 2015. As part of the agreement, Gruevski resigned in January 2016 and pledged to hold early elections, which were decided on later that year to be held on June 5.

On 12 April 2016, President of Macedonia Gjorge Ivanov halted judicial inquiries into 56 officials suspected of involvement in the wiretapping scandal. Ivanov stated to have done so in the best interest of the country, and to end the political crisis. His party of appointment, the VMRO-DPMNE allegedly did not agree with his action. Opposition leader Zoran Zaev subsequently called for supporting anti-government protests organized by NGOs.

== The protests ==
Demonstrations have begun on 12 April 2016, with reports suggesting that about 4,000+ people took part. Crowds broke through a police cordon towards government buildings, throwing flares at President Ivanov's offices and burning portraits of him. More actions occurred on 14 April, with five police officers being injured from people throwing rocks and one protester being detained. The demonstration that occurred on 16 April and ended peacefully, but on 17 April, protesters threw eggs and stones at the triumphal arc on Skopje. Thousands of people demonstrated in Skopje on 15 April, carrying white flags and banners. On 18 April, it was reported that more than ten thousand people took part in demonstrations in Skopje, with protests also happening in other cities of Macedonia (including Bitola, Strumica and Veles).

The protest on 19 April began in front of the special prosecutor's office, proceeded to parliament and was stopped by police before reaching the EU mission. It numbered in the thousands. Several thousand people turned out for demonstrations on the eighth day of the protest, 20 April. At this point, throwing colours at various governmental buildings and monuments of the Skopje 2014 project had become a regular feature at the protests, and the term "colourful revolution“ gained some popularity among the protesters and the social media. On the eighth day, journalists also began referring to the protests as "colorful revolution“ - with Kristina Ozimec's article for Deutsche Welle being the first to use the term. Also on that day, Zaev announced that he would not be willing to take part in EU-brokered talks in Vienna (proposed by European Commissioner Johannes Hahn two days earlier) unless certain conditions are met. On 21 April, two rallies were held near each other in Skopje, each attended by thousands of people. One was anti-government, organized by the SDSM and the "Protestiram" (I Protest) organization, while the second was organized by the Citizens for Macedonian Defense (GDOM, in Macedonian), supported by the ruling VMRO party. The anti-government protest started in front of the special prosecutor's building, where protesters shouted "No Justice No Peace" and "Support the SJO" (special prosecution). The pro-government protesters shouted, "No one can harm you Nikola" and carried anti-NATO banners. On 22 April in 11 cities in Macedonia, there were big antigovernment demonstrations organized by "Protestiram" (I Protest) organization and supported by united opposition of Macedonia. On the same day, European Union announced sanctions for politics and persons from VMRO-DPMNE.

On 23 April, the anti-government protests continued in several cities in the country. The next day, Zdravko Saveski, member of the collective presidency of the left-wing party The Left and one other member of the same party were put in house custody. Previously, three more protesters were put in house custody. The protests organized by "Protestiram" (I protest) and supported by the opposition and nongovernmental organizations continued in several cities and the between 15,000 and 20,000 demonstrators in Skopje protest in front of the parliament, the several ministry, and in front of the government. On 25 April, a large pro-government rally occurred in Bitola, organized by the Citizens for Macedonian Defense (GDOM, in Macedonian), with thousands in attendance. They rallied in support of the planned parliamentary elections on June 5. On Tuesday, 26 April, the anti-government protests begin in new 3 cities: Tetovo, Kičevo and Radoviš, and this day there was protest in 15 cities in Macedonia. There was a pro-government rally on April 27, organized by GDOM in the city of Kicevo in support of the planned parliamentary elections on June 5. The anti-government protests continued after the holidays on 2 and 3 May in Skopje, Tetovo, Bitola, Prilep, Strumica, Kumanovo and Gevgelija. In Skopje, demonstrators protest in front of parliament, government and courts.

On 4 May, farmers join the "Protestiram" (I protest) movement with road block in the country. Also on that day, mass pro-government demonstrations organized by the GDOM occurred in Bitola, Stip, Veles, Delčevo, Gevgelija, Strumica, Kumanovo, Tetovo and Radoviš, in support of the June 5 elections. A spokesperson for the GDOM told the media that they needed to prevent destructive scenarios and allow the people to make their decision by voting in the scheduled elections. On 6 May 2016, there were anti-government protests in 14 cities around the country. In Skopje, there were demonstrators with symbols of resistance, and they were singing the resistance song "Bella Ciao" in front of the parliament and the government. On 5 May, the government of Germany appointed a special envoy, the former German ambassador to Yugoslavia, to help resolve the political crisis. Another GDOM demonstration occurred in Bitola on May 7. On 9 May, thousands of demonstrators in Skopje with Macedonian and EU flags, songs and resistance symbols protested in front of the parliament and government buildings. That day, there were also anti-government demonstrations in 11 other cities in the country including Strumica, Bitola, Prilep and Berovo.

On 12 May, the demonstrators protested in several cities in the country. In Skopje, thousands of demonstrators protested in front of the home of the former prime minister and leader of VMRO-DPMNE. The anti-government protests continued and on 14 May, there were anti-government protests in 12 cities. In Skopje, Prilep and Strumica on this day the numbers of anti-government demonstrators were thousands. On the same day, there were two GDOM pro-government protests in Kicevo and Bitola. Also, on the same day, the state election commission (Macedonian: Државна изборна комисија - "ДИК") released that only two parties including VMRO-DPMNE submitted lists for elections. The SDSM and 16 parties part of the 'Platform for Democratic Macedonia', submitted no election lists and decided to boycott the elections because as they said there weren't the minimal conditions to free, fair and democratic elections. The next day, world media stated that VMRO-DPMNE was only party running and that elections would have to be postponed because according to the constitution of Republic of Macedonia, more than one party must be running at the elections. On 18 May, the Constitutional Court of Republic of Macedonia cancelled the elections and suggested to the parliament to change the election rule and postpone the early elections. The anti-government protests and demonstrations continued in the next days and weeks in several cities.

On 26 May, Macedonian media released that the next day the parliament will begin a procedure for impeachment of president Ivanov, supported by the main opposition party SDSM, with other parties from the opposition coalition such as NSDP and LDP, and other parties such as DOM, DS, and ruling DUI. On 6 June, there were huge anti-government demonstrations in Skopje and Bitola. The demonstrators gave an ultimatum on the 18th of June to the government and President Ivanov to resign. The same day, president Ivanov overturned abolition. On 17 June, there was an anti-government protest to warn the government and president that it was the last day for the ultimatum from the "Протестирам" (I protest) to Ivanov and government to resign. On June 20, tens of thousands took part of massive anti-government demonstrations in the capital Skopje.

== Reactions ==
=== Domestic ===
After three political parties asked him to reconsider, President Ivanov announced on 15 April that he will stand by his decision regarding the amnesty of politicians. He said, "I think the decision protects the state interest and I inform you that I am standing by it." When the EU offered to host negotiations in Vienna, Zaev stated that he would only be willing to do so if "Ivanov withdraws all the pardons he granted, and... parliament re-convenes and revokes the decision to call elections on June 5th, because there are no conditions for it." In late April, police placed five demonstrators under house arrest, among them Zdravko Saveski and Vladimir Kunovski, members of presidium of The Left, for vandalizing the presidential offices.

One of the country's largest parties and member of the government coalition, the ethnic Albanian party Democratic Union for Integration, questioned the legitimacy of the elections for June 5, saying that they would not be possible without the opposition's participation. On May 11, another two Albanian parties in Macedonia proclaimed that they would join the boycott of the elections.

=== International ===
- Bulgaria — The Minister of Foreign Affairs of Bulgaria, Daniel Mitov, urged for political dialogue in order to find a solution to the crisis and for people to refrain from violence on 14 April. He stated "I call on all political leaders in the Republic of Macedonia to immediately resume political dialogue and to seek common solutions to the current political crisis, in the first place to occupy themselves with maintaining public order and internal stability. I appeal for refraining from any form of violence." Mitov also said it is necessary to continue to implement the Przino Agreement, signed in 2015. He stated, "I urge politicians in the Republic of Macedonia to take up the agenda of reforms, to strengthen democratic institutions in the interest of all citizens and to restore the Republic of Macedonia to the path of European integration."
- Croatia — The President of Social Democratic Party of Croatia and leader of Croatian opposition Zoran Milanović met with Zoran Zaev, president of SDSM and opposition leader in Macedonia, and stated on May 12 that he and his party give full support to Zaev and the SDSM since they are all "progressive forces in battle for democratic principles" in Macedonia.
- European Union — It was suggested by the European Commission member Johannes Hahn on 18 April 2016 that a meeting be held in Vienna, Austria, on 22 April, so that the two sides can come to an agreement. "The aim of the meeting will be to discuss ways to solve the crisis, and to ensure that leaders will continue with the implementation of the Przino agreement," a spokesperson stated. The VMRO agreed to attend, while the SDSM said there should be a response in the coming days. On 15 April, Donald Tusk, chairman of the European Council said that the future of Macedonia in NATO and the EU is under threat as a result of these events. On 21 April, the EU decided to cancel the planned meeting between Macedonian politicians in Vienna, saying "The persisting rule of law issues in [the capital] Skopje, which undermine this agreement, must be addressed without any further delay." On May 1, the EU ambassador in Macedonia, Aivo Orav, conveyed a message from Johannes Hahn to the four major party leaders in Macedonia that they renew dialogue and come to a solution to this crisis. He also urged them to continue the reforms to make conditions for "truly fair elections." On 11 May, it was revealed that EU and US diplomats were involved in talks with both the government and opposition, but made little progress.
- Germany — In a statement, the Foreign Office announced that "The political situation in Macedonia is a cause for concern in the German federal government." On 5 May, former German ambassador to Austria, Yugoslavia, and head of the Foreign Office's southeast Europe and Turkey department Johannes Haindl was appointed as the German special envoy to help resolve the Macedonian political crisis, by foreign minister Frank-Walter Steinmeier. It was reported on May 12 that Haindl would present three demands to the leaders of Macedonia's four largest political parties: cancel the pardon of politicians, cancel the early elections, and protect the Constitutional Court's integrity.
- Italy — Former Italian member of parliament Luca Volontè stated in an interview that the reason for Zaev's boycott of the elections scheduled for June 5 is that he knows that he does not have enough support to win them.
- Russia — The Russian Ministry of Foreign Affairs voiced its concern about the political crisis in Macedonia. On 14 April the Foreign Ministry gave a statement, "We have received messages about the escalation of the political confrontation in Macedonia that is taking place in Skopje with concern. We call on all the sides [to the dispute] to engage in political dialogue." Additionally, the Foreign Ministry stated that it is concerned by foreign interference in the events, saying that the Macedonian opposition became an instrument for escalating conflict. It also said that the opposition is attempting to disrupt the elections to be held on June 5, which Russia considers the only legitimate way out of the crisis, and warned about the potential of a "Ukrainian scenario" which could "destabilize the Balkans."
- Serbia — The Prime Minister of Serbia, Aleksandar Vucic, said that he is concerned about the situation in the country, stating that the "Ukrainization of Macedonia" does not help anyone. "Clashes and disorder and every kind of destabilization threaten to affect the entire region, we in Serbia work to preserve peace and stability," he said on 16 April.
- United States — The Department of State commented that the U.S. is "deeply concerned" about the decision of President Gjorge Ivanov to pardon 56 politicians. Spokesman John Kirby stated on 13 April that "This decision will protect corrupt officials and deny justice to the people of Macedonia." He also said that it undermined the integrity of the country's judicial system and did not follow EU or NATO values. Kirby stated, "It will also further undermine Macedonian rule of law, the integrity of its judicial institutions, and the credibility of its leaders’ commitment to the fundamental values of NATO and the European Union." On May 11, it was reported that the EU and US ambassadors in Macedonia were involved in talks with both the government and the opposition. United States Ambassador to Macedonia Jess Baily stated "we remain in touch with the parties".

== See also ==
- Corruption in North Macedonia
- 2018-19 Bosnian protests
- 2020 Slovenian protests
- 2011 Macedonian protests
- 2015 Macedonian protests
- 2017 storming of Macedonian Parliament
- 2022 North Macedonia protests
