= Pržino Agreement =

The Pržino agreement or agreement from 2 June – 15 July 2015 was a political agreement between the main political parties in the Republic of Macedonia with the mediation of the European Union. The agreement ended the Macedonian political and institutional crisis in the first half of 2015. It foresaw: the participation of the opposition party SDSM in the ministries; the early resignation of prime minister Nikola Gruevski in January 2016 and a caretaker government to bring the country to general elections in June 2016, as well as a Special prosecutor to lead the investigations about the eventual crimes highlighted by the wiretapping scandal.

== Background ==
In May 2015, protests occurred in Skopje, North Macedonia, against the incumbent Prime Minister Nikola Gruevski and his government. Protests began following charges brought against Zoran Zaev, the opposition leader, who responded by alleging that Gruevski had 20,000 Macedonian officials and other figures wiretapped, and covered up the murder of a young man by a police officer in 2011. A major protest occurred on 5 May, seeing violent clashes between activists and police, with injuries on both sides. On 12 May, the Interior Minister Gordana Jankuloska, Transportation Minister Mile Janakieski, and Director of the Administration for Security and Counterintelligence (UBK) Sašo Mijalkov resigned because they were the main interlocutors in many of the incriminating tapes.

== Implementation ==
The implementation of the Przino Deal proved troublesome, with opposition SDSM party accusing the largest party, VMRO-DPMNE, of dragging their feet. The nomination of Katica Janeva as Special Prosecutor was hailed as a breakthrough, but the appointment of her team (considered too close to the VMRO) raised eyebrows. On 14 October 2015, the SDSM leader Zoran Zaev announced that the deal "is no longer active", after failure by the Council of Public Prosecutors to appoint half of the candidates proposed by Janeva. On 4 November, the other candidates were elected and the team of Katica Janeva was completed. On 4 November, a deal was reached concerning ministers and vice-ministers in transitional (technical) government. The agreement called for the resignation of prime-minister Nikola Gruevski in January 2016. On 14 January, Nikola Gruevski officially resigned from position Prime Minister of Macedonia and then, the Assembly of Macedonia on 17 January elected Emil Dimitriev (interim PM) as president on a technical government which will lead the Republic into the early general elections in June 2016.

== See also ==
- 2015 Macedonian protests
- 2016 Macedonian protests ("Colorful Revolution")
