= List of international prime ministerial trips made by Nikola Gruevski =

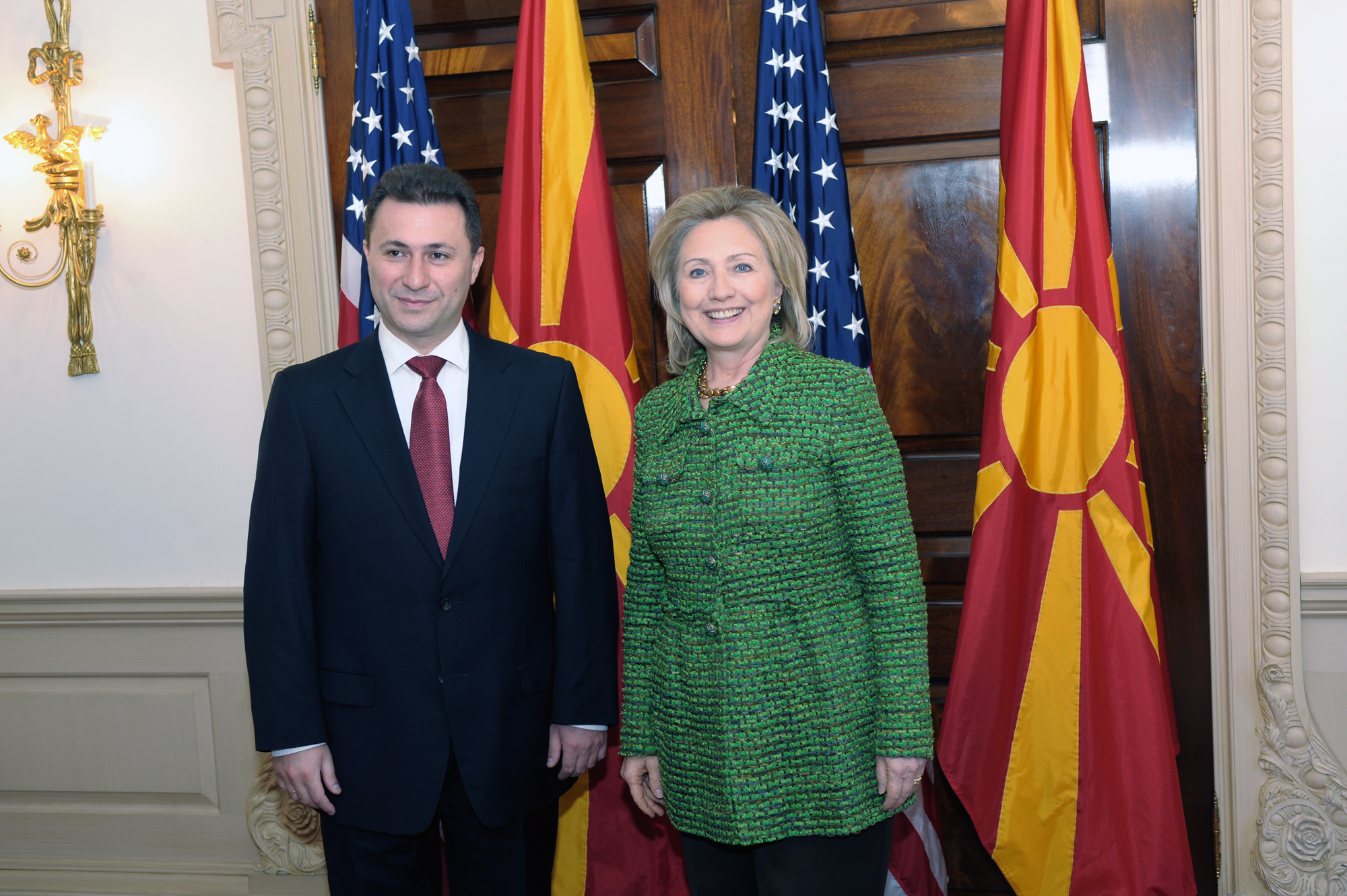
Gruevski and U.S. Secretary of State Hillary Clinton, Washington, D.C., 16 February 2011

This is a list of state visits made by Nikola Gruevski, the Prime Minister of Macedonia from 2006 to 2016.

== Visits ==
Date	Country	Cities visited	Note
October 2006	Germany	Berlin	Official State Visit
November 2007	Bulgaria	Sofia	Official State Visit
December 24, 2008	Montenegro	Podgorica	Official State Visit
January 26–27, 2009	Slovenia	Ljubljana	Official State Visit
October 2009	Australia	Canberra, Melbourne, Sydney	Official State Visit
October 2009	Slovakia	Bratislava	Official State Visit
November, 2009	Bulgaria	Sofia	Official State Visit
November 2010	Ukraine	Kyiv	Official State Visit
November 2012	Albania	Tirana	Official State Visit
September 17, 2013	Croatia	Zagreb	Official State Visit
November 13, 2013	Slovenia	Ljubljana	Official State Visit
September, 2014	Turkey	Istanbul, Ankara, İzmir	Official State Visit
October, 2014	Czech Republic	Prague	Official State Visit
December, 2014	Saudi Arabia	Riyadh	Official State Visit
