= 2017 storming of the Macedonian Parliament =

- Part of Macedonian political crisis (2015-17)
- Date: 27 April 2017
- Location: Skopje, Republic of Macedonia
- Caused by: New parliament majority elected speaker of the Assembly of the Republic of Macedonia; Election of ethnic Albanian as Speaker of the Assembly of the Republic of Macedonia; Transfer of power from VMRO-DPMNE to SDSM
- Methods: Violence in the Parliament building
- Result: Internationally recognized new speaker of parliament

Number
200+	22+

Casualties
- Injuries: 102
- Charged: 33

On 27 April 2017, about 200 Macedonian nationalists (some of whom were members and sympathizers of VMRO-DPMNE) stormed the Macedonian Parliament in reaction to the election of Talat Xhaferi, an ethnic Albanian, as Speaker of the Assembly of the Republic of Macedonia. The event has been called Bloody Thursday (Macedonian: Крвав четврток, romanized: Krvav četvrtok).

== Background ==
The Republic of Macedonia had been involved for years in political turmoil, which culminated in mass anti-government protests in 2015 and 2016. The protests were the result of corruption allegations, which were the main cause of Republic of Macedonia's political crisis, against VMRO-DPMNE leader and prime minister, Nikola Gruevski, and his coalition partners. They were further accused of preventing the formation of a new government after the parliamentary election in 2016 to avoid losing power and facing prosecution for corruption.

The conflict also had ethnic undertones, no coalition government had been formed because of the demand for Albanian to be the second official language in the Republic of Macedonia, and the opposition leader Zoran Zaev had attempted to form a coalition government with Albanian ethnic parties. There had been daily protests across the country by supporters of the VMRO-DPMNE in response. The Republic of Macedonia had seen mass ethnic violence in the previous years, particularly in 2001 and 2012.

== Earlier protests ==
Gruevski called for protests on 26 February with the words "all those who plan to sit at home and to watch TV believing that someone else will do their job to protect their country, are mistaken" against the formation of a new coalition government. The protests began on 27 February, organized by the Macedonian nationalist association For a United Macedonia (claimed to be a proxy of VMRO-DPMNE), under the same slogan. Anti-Albanian slogans were heard during the protests.

At the same time, more than 20 organizations called "patriotic associations" were founded and announced that they would use a variety of violent and non-violent means to prevent "attempts to destroy the Republic of Macedonia". A rally held in Skopje was attended by prominent members and supporters of the VMRO-DPMNE, as well as by the heads of various state enterprises. Protesters were waving flags and placards reading 'Freedom or Death'. Two journalists were attacked during the rally. Protests were held in other Macedonian cities as well.

== Storming ==
The storming of the Parliament began on 7:00 p.m. After the end of the parliamentary session at 6:00 p.m, which was chaired by president Trajko Veljanovski (from the previous parliamentary composition), the deputies from the parliamentary majority remained in the plenary hall to elect a new parliament president. Talat Xhaferi from the Democratic Union for Integration was elected as the new Speaker of the Assembly during the session. During the inauguration of Xhaferi, MPs from VMRO-DPMNE shouted that it was a "coup".

Around 200 protesters from "For a United Macedonia" stormed the Parliament building after Xhaferi had been elected as the speaker. They were protesting in front of the building prior to the storming. Many were masked and they threw chairs, tripods and punches at journalists and MPs, which injured the SDSM leader, Zoran Zaev (who had a bloody forehead wound), and fellow MPs. Radmila Šekerinska, the deputy head of the SDSM, required stitches after she was dragged by her hair. An MP from Alliance for the Albanians, Ziadin Sela, was severely attacked by several demonstrators, some of whom dragged him on the floor and kicked him while he was unconscious and covered in blood. He required treatment for brain injuries. The assailants also displayed Macedonian flags and shouted "traitors" at the MPs.

The demonstrators initially faced little opposition from the outnumbered police who were stationed at the Parliament. Police later deployed stun grenades to disperse the mob. The demonstrators were expelled from the building, and the MPs who were trapped inside were evacuated.

== Reactions ==
The attack on the Parliament was strongly condemned by the international community. The violence was condemned by the European Union, Albania and NATO, which also greeted the election of Xhaferi as the new Parliament speaker.

SDSM accused VMRO-DPMNE of inciting violence and causing "hatred and division" among Macedonians. Zaev described the event as "attempted murder", accusing former Prime Minister Nikola Gruevski and former President Gjorge Ivanov of inciting the violence.

Interior Minister Agim Nuhiu condemned the attack on the Parliament and stated that the "persons in authority of the Ministry who are responsible for yesterday's events will be held accountable". He also stated that the Director of the Bureau of Public Security, Mitko Čavkov, had deliberately hindered police intervention and that during the attack, Čavkov had not been available on his phone for two hours. The US embassy in Skopje condemned the violence and accepted Xhaferi's election.

A DUI spokesman called the outbreak of violence "a sad day for Macedonia". A spokesman for the human rights organization Council of Europe said the incident was "alarming", while Albanian Prime Minister Edi Rama expressed concern over the "really dramatic" situation. Albania's Foreign Ministry also said it was monitoring the "escalation" of violence in its neighbour, which it said was "unacceptable".

== Aftermath ==
Due to the attack, journalists and others had to be hospitalized. The police blocked streets leading to the parliament on 28 April. On 30 April, 15 people were already charged for "participation in a mob and preventing officials from performing their duties." On 2 May, Talat Xhaferi was blocked from entering his office until the next day by VMRO-DPMNE MPs, who considered his election invalid. Nationalist protests continued in early May. On 3 May, Interior Minister Nuhiu requested for the dismissal of Mitko Čavkov from the position of Director of the Bureau of Public Security.

In total, 33 people were charged with "terrorist endangerment of the constitutional order and security" of the country. Video footage from security cameras inside the Parliament had captured VMRO-DPMNE MPs opening the doors and directing the assailants to the room where the MPs from the opposition and the journalists were. The Social-Democrat led-coalition government was also formed on 31 May, after much delay.

=== Legal proceedings ===
A trial in May 2017 against nine individuals convicted for the violence that occurred in the Parliament ended with them receiving suspended sentences, which caused outrage. A spokesperson of the SDSM has called the verdict "orchestrated, criminal, and shameful". In July 2018, the Skopje Criminal Court sentenced seven men to prison for the attempted murder of Sela.

During one of the trials in 2018, state prosecutor Vilma Ruskovska stated: "The attack of the parliament on 27 April wasn't a spontaneous attack of emotions, but a planned attack by the accused". The trial was against around 30 people, including five VMRO-DPMNE MPs, and former interior minister Mitko Čavkov, among other government and security officials. In December 2018, the parliament passed the Amnesty Law, which permitted amnesty for people who were not personally involved in violence and did not organize the storming. In 2019, former Director of Bureau of Public Safety Mitko Čavkov was sentenced to 18 years in prison, while the police chiefs Mitko Pešov, Duško Lazarov and Goran Gjoševski were sentenced to 15 years in prison. Opera singer Igor Durlovski, who was part of "For United Macedonia", was acquitted. Fifteen of the accused were granted an amnesty, which included the five MPs of the VMRO-DPMNE and the organizers of "For a United Macedonia", among them were those members of parliament who voted to change the country's name. Čavkov was not among those who were amnestied, so he complained to the Constitutional Court that the Amnesty Law was discriminatory, violating his constitutional rights and freedoms, and the rule of law. The Constitutional Court declared his request to examine the constitutionality of the law inadmissible on the justification that the parliament decided the conditions of amnesty and who would be amnestied. During a trial, when a protected witness had to be cross-examined, some lawyers of the suspects complained that they did not have adequate working conditions. A court fined the lawyers 1000 euros each for contempt of court, but it was reduced to 500 euros after they appealed. Two lawyers, who were fined, complained to the Constitutional Court that the fines interfered with their freedom of expression. Based on a decision of the European Court of Human Rights, the Constitutional Court determined that the lawyers' freedom of expression was violated.

Former Speaker Trajko Veljanovski was sentenced to six years and six months in prison, and former Transport and Labour Ministers Mile Janakieski and Spiro Ristovski were sentenced to six years and three months in prison. The former head of the Administration for Security and Counterintelligence, Vladimir Atanasovski, was also sentenced to six years. They were all members of the VMRO-DPMNE and were convicted of "terrorist endangerment of constitutional order" as organizers of the storming. On 23 January 2025, a court in Skopje ordered the release of Veljanovski, Ristovski, Janakieski and Atanasovski, citing the 2018 amnesty law.

=== Ministry of Interior and police oversights ===
In May 2017, 15 police officers and one person of authority in the Ministry were suspended. From the video material, it was established that the police officers passively observed the mob before and after they entered the Parliament, enabling their assault. In June, the Ministry of Interior published a report on the oversights by the Ministry and the police during the violence in the Macedonian Parliament. 23 police officers in total were suspended from work, and a disciplinary measure was initiated for 45. 11 police officers (due to inaction), security chiefs and 2 employees of the secret police (for tampering with evidence) were sacked in November 2017.

=== Protests demanding release of suspects and convicts ===
Members and sympathizers of the patriotic associations posted pictures reading "President Ivanov, Absolution for the Patriots" on their Facebook profiles. Some patriotic associations also submitted a petition to Ivanov for the release of the involved people in July 2017, describing the people who stormed the parliament as "patriots" defending the "honor" and "dignity" of the nation against the "threat" of the new government, which was willing to negotiate about Albanian demands regarding the status of the Albanian language in the country. In November 2017, a protest was led by Gruevski against the arrest of people who were suspected of involvement in the attack, including his own MPs, Mitko Čavkov, and other former police employees. Gruevski was also originally suspected of organizing the attack, but to avoid serving a prison sentence for corruption, he fled to Hungary in 2018 where he has been granted asylum and has been living there since then. A protest on 25 April 2021 was organized by Macedonian diaspora organizations and the families of the convicted people in front of the government and the Parliament building under the slogan "Democracy in Macedonia and freedom for the defenders of the constitution" and demanded the release of people convicted for the attack, which was supported by the VMRO-DPMNE and other smaller right-wing parties.

High-ranking members and the leader of the VMRO-DPMNE, Hristijan Mickoski, were also present in the protest. He wrote on social media: "We support and demand the release of the defenders of the constitution, they are not and cannot be terrorists. They are honest citizens of this country". The protest was criticized by Ziadin Sela and the ruling Social Democrats, saying that the opposition party "stands for the defense of crime and criminals." A second protest was organized on 29 May under the slogan "Justice for the defenders of the constitution". The organizers of the protests claimed that the convictions had been "politically motivated".

== See also ==
- List of attacks on legislatures
