= Dimitar Kovačevski =

Prime Minister of North Macedonia from 2022 to 2024

- Димитар Ковачевски
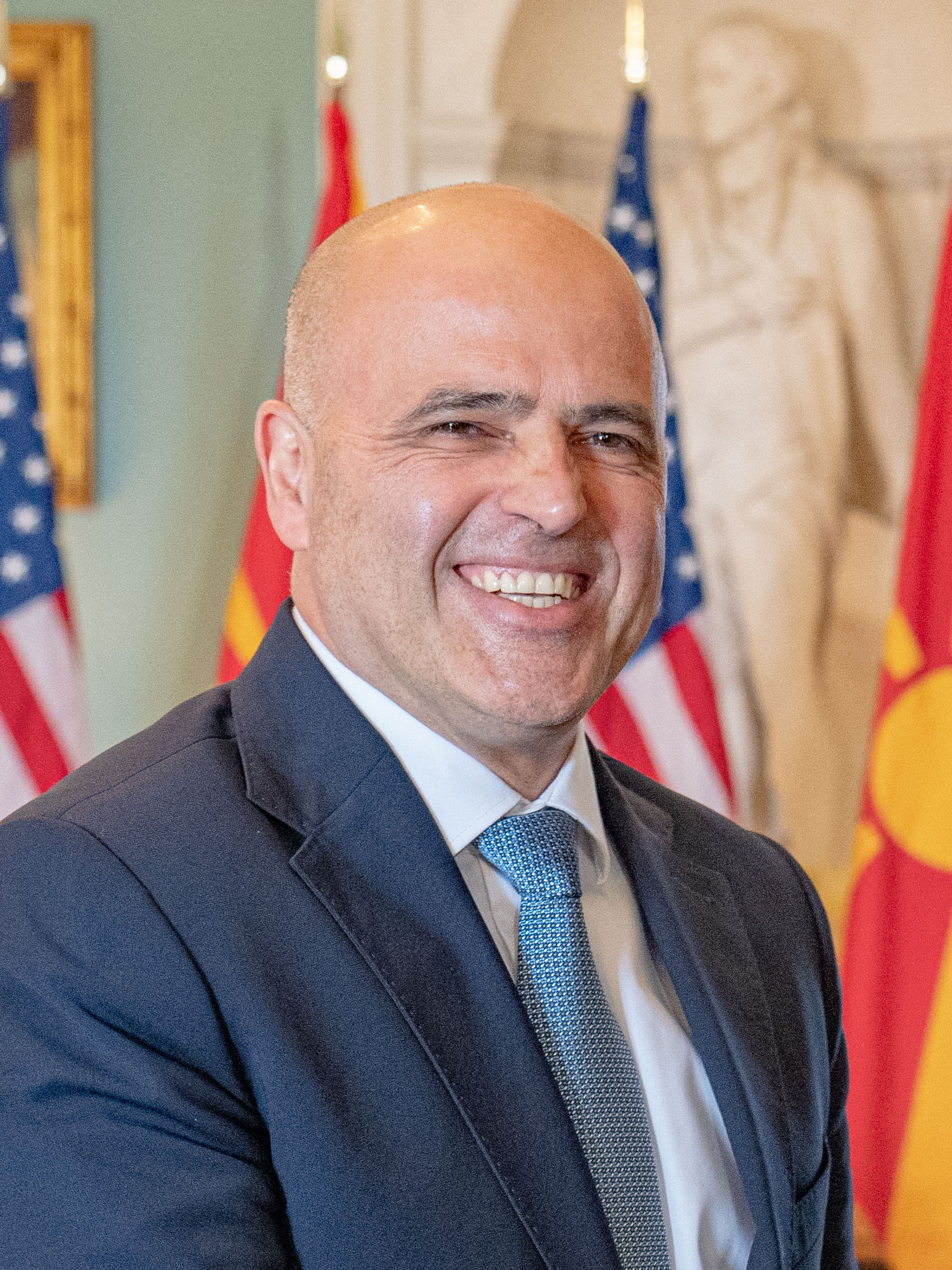
- Kovačevski in 2023

Prime Minister of North Macedonia
- In office 16 January 2022 – 28 January 2024
- President: Stevo Pendarovski
- Preceded by: Zoran Zaev
- Succeeded by: Talat Xhaferi

Member of the Assembly
- Incumbent
- Assumed office 28 May 2024

Leader of the Social Democratic Union
- In office 12 December 2021 – 26 May 2024
- Deputy: Radmila Šekerinska
- Preceded by: Zoran Zaev
- Succeeded by: Venko Filipče

Personal details
- Born: 24 July 1974 (age 51) Kumanovo, SR Macedonia, Yugoslavia
- Party: Social Democratic Union
- Profession: Economist

Dimitar Kovačevski (Note: Macedonian: Димитар Ковачевски, pronounced [di'mitar kɔ'vat͡ʃɛfski]) (born 24 July 1974) is a Macedonian politician and economist who served as prime minister of North Macedonia from January 2022 to January 2024.

A member of the Social Democratic Union of Macedonia (SDSM), Kovačevski previously served as deputy finance minister from 2020 until his appointment as prime minister in 2022 after the resignation of Zoran Zaev and as president of SDSM from 2021 to 2024.

== Background ==
Kovačevski was born in Kumanovo. He is the son of Slobodan Kovačevski, mayor of Kumanovo from 2000 to 2005 and ambassador of the Republic of Macedonia to Montenegro after the establishment of diplomatic relations between the two countries in 2006. He completed high school education in Waterville, Minnesota, United States. In 1998 he graduated at the Faculty of Economics at Ss. Cyril and Methodius University of Skopje and received a master's degree at the same Faculty in 2003. In 2008 he completed doctoral studies in economics at the Faculty of Economics at the University of Montenegro.

Kovačevski started his working career in 1998 at the Macedonian telecommunications company Makedonski Telekom. From 2005 to 2017 he held a number of managerial positions in the company. From 2017 to 2018 he was the executive director of A1 Macedonia (then known as one.Vip), a subsidiary of Telekom Austria Group.

Kovačevski was an assistant professor at two private universities in Skopje since 2012, first at the New York University of Skopje, and then at the Faculty of Business Economics and Management at University American College Skopje, where in 2018 he was elected associate professor.

In 2018, Kovačevski co-founded a private company, which opened the first domestic factory for the production of photovoltaic modules in North Macedonia.

He has been a member of the Social Democratic Union of Macedonia (SDSM) since 1994.

== Political career ==
After the 2020 parliamentary elections in North Macedonia, Kovačevski was appointed Deputy Minister of Finance in Zoran Zaev's second government. The parliament elected him to this position on 23 September 2020.

Zaev announced his resignation as both prime minister and leader of the SDSM after a defeat in the 2021 local elections. This caused instability in the fragile ruling majority, which nevertheless survived a push from the opposition led by VMRO-DPMNE for a no-confidence vote. In the aftermath, Zaev's government strengthened its majority in the parliament by gaining the support of four other MPs from Alternativa, which until then was in the opposition. Kovačevski accompanied Zaev during negotiations with Alternativa, which launched his name as Zaev's most likely successor.

After Zaev officially resigned as president of the SDSM, Kovačevski won the internal party elections on 12 December 2021, leaving the other two candidates far behind in votes and succeeding Zaev as leader of the party. He was sworn in as prime minister on 16 January 2022.

On 25 January 2024, Kovačevski resigned. Starting from 28 January, 100 days prior to the parliamentary elections on 8 May, a technical government in accordance with the Pržino Agreement led the country. After SDSM's defeat in the parliamentary elections, he stepped down from his position as party leader and was succeeded by Venko Filipče.

== Private life ==
On 10 February 2024, Kovačevski was seen in the audience at the concert in Skopje given by Dalmatian artist Jelena Rozga as part of her Minut Srca Mog Tour.

== Notes ==
Political offices
Preceded by Zoran Zaev	Prime Minister of North Macedonia; 2022–2024	Succeeded by Talat Xhaferi
Party political offices
Preceded by Zoran Zaev	Leader of the Social Democratic Union; 2021–2024	Succeeded by Venko Filipče
