= 2009 Lake Ohrid boat accident =

Coordinates: 41.083°N 20.75°E

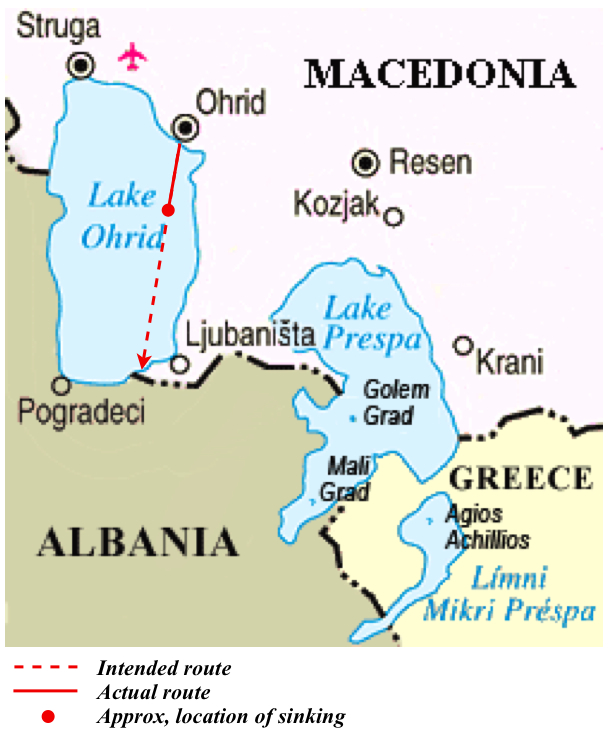
Approximate location of sinking in Lake Ohrid

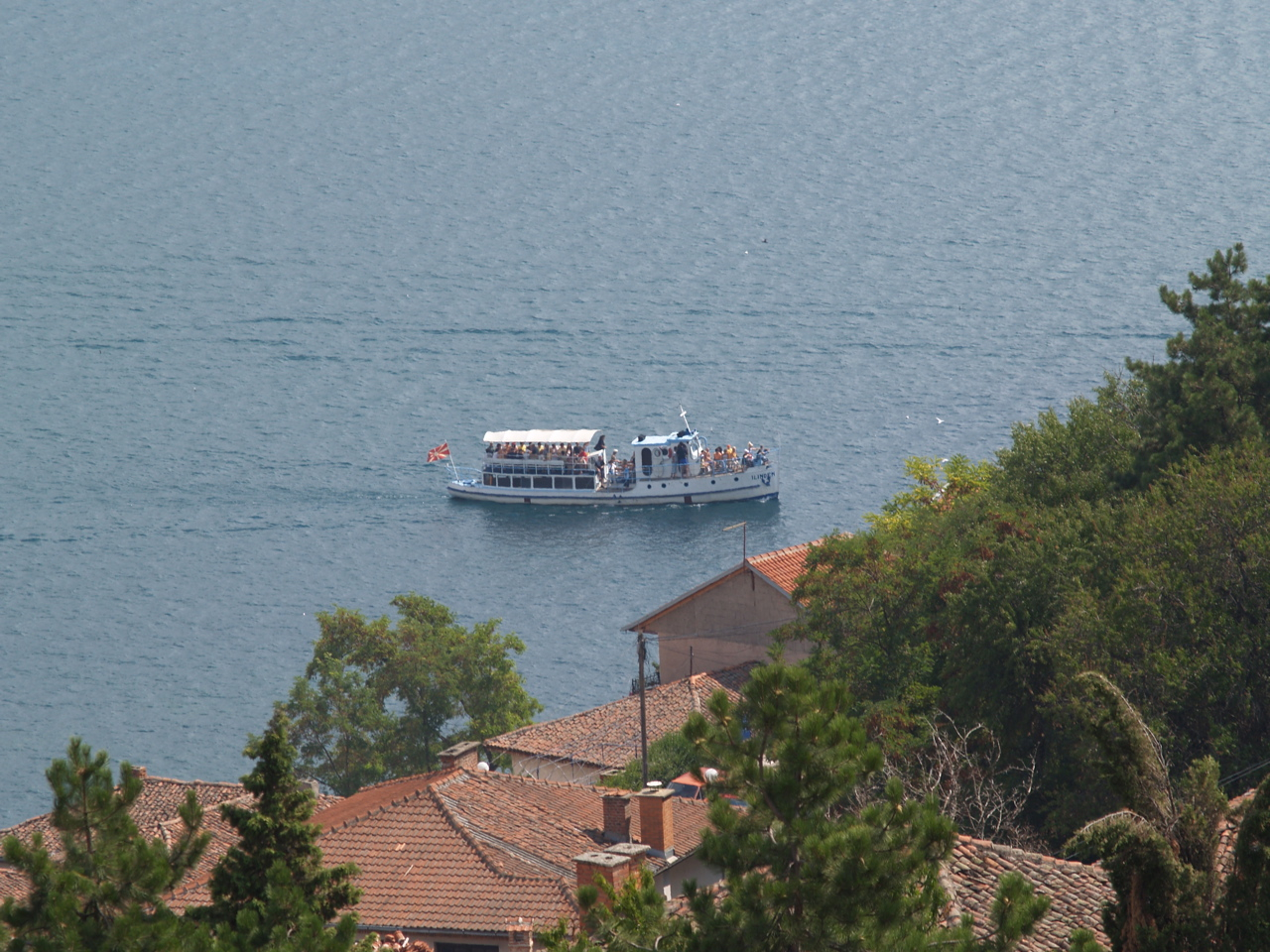
Ilinden, the boat

On 5 September 2009, the Ilinden sightseeing boat with a group of 57 foreign tourists on board, of which 55 were Bulgarian, sank in Lake Ohrid, southwestern Republic of Macedonia. Fifteen people died. The sinking of the Ilinden was the deadliest boat accident in the history of the Republic of Macedonia (now North Macedonia).

Lake Ohrid is the deepest lake in the Balkans, with maximum depth of 288 metres (945 ft). The Ilinden boat was taking tourists to the Saint Naum Monastery. The boat, built in 1924, had a maximum capacity of 45 passengers. It sank within four minutes, some 200 metres (700 ft) from the shore, in shallow waters. The boat is said to have sunk around 11:00 AM local time, in the vicinity of the Elešec camping site. Two other boats, the Alexandria and the Kristina, were nearby and were able to assist the passengers of the Ilinden. Most of the tourists on board were senior citizens, many of whom were unable to swim. Victims were from Pirdop, Zlatitsa, Chelopech and particularly Anton.

The Republic of Macedonia's top officials visited the place of the accident. Prime Minister of Bulgaria Boyko Borisov ordered that a Bulgarian government aeroplane bring the surviving Bulgarians back home. Another aeroplane, a Bulgarian Air Force C-27J Spartan, transported the remains of Bulgarian victims. The Minister of Transportation and Communications of the Republic of Macedonia Mile Janakievski offered his resignation over the accident due to moral reasons, which was not accepted by Prime Minister Nikola Gruevski.

6 September was declared a national day of mourning in the Republic of Macedonia. Similarly, 7 September was declared a national day of mourning in Bulgaria and all official events related to the celebration of the Bulgarian unification on 6 September were cancelled. A minute of silence was observed before Macedonia and Bulgaria's 2010 FIFA World Cup qualifiers later on 5 September and against Scotland and Montenegro.

A nongovernmental organization, the Bulgarian Cultural Club – Skopje proposed to Mayor Aleksandar Petreski of Ohrid the erection of a monument commemorating both the victims of the accident and those whose help saved many lives.

In November 2020, a monument in Ohrid to the Bulgarian tourists that died on the ship Ilinden was vandalized and destroyed. On the 28th of November, the mayor of Ohrid, Konstantin Georgieski announced that the plaque had been replaced.

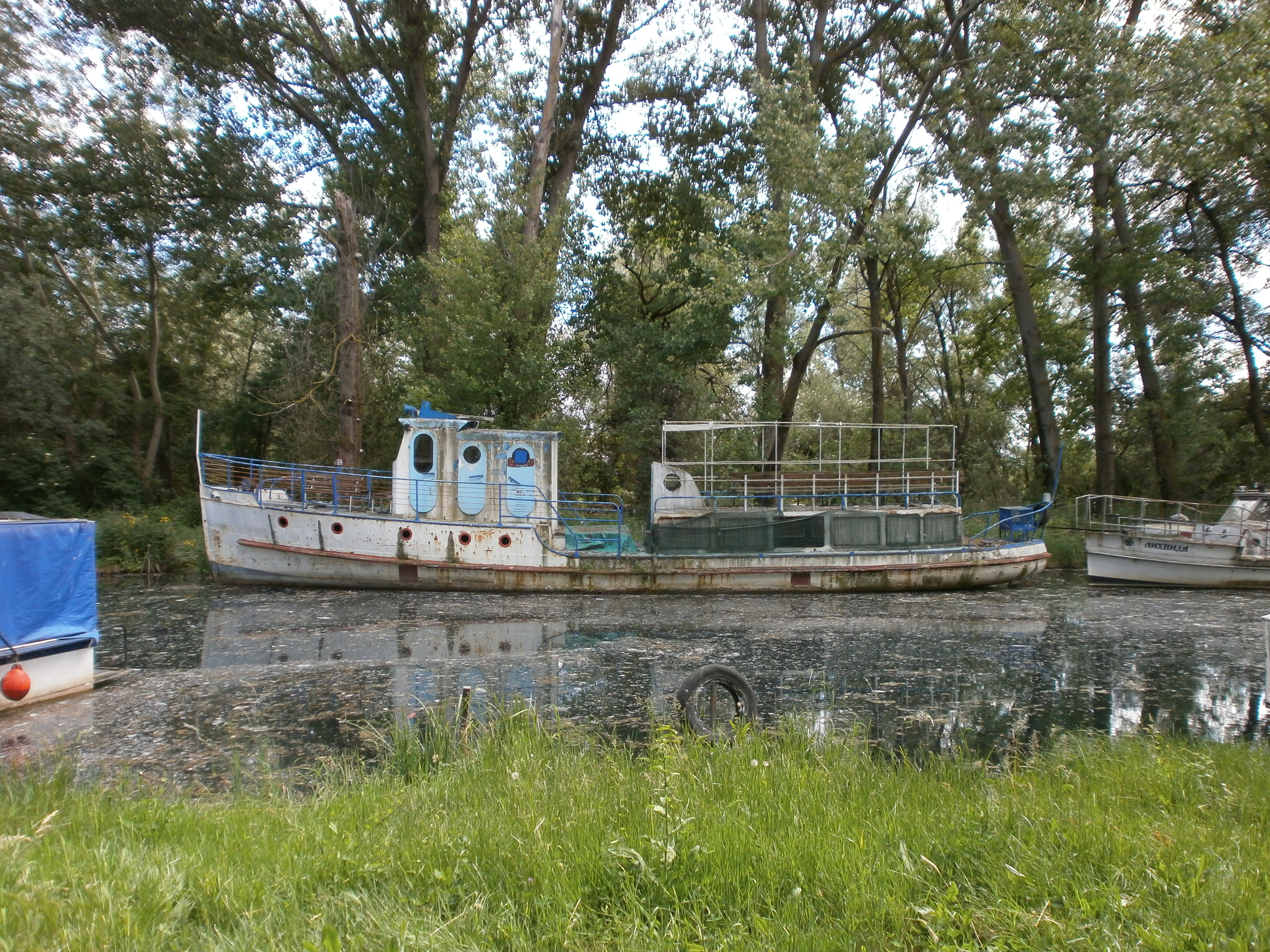
The Ilinden still unused (2016)
