= Zoran Veruševski =

Macedonian politician

Zoran Verushevski Зоран Верушевски

3rd Director of the Administration for Security and Counterintelligence
- Preceded by: Dobri Velichkovski
- Succeeded by: Bojan Bojanovski

Personal details
- Born: Zoran Verushevski
- Ethnicity: Macedonian

Military service
- Allegiance: Yugoslavia
- Branch/service: Yugoslav People's Army

Zoran Verushevski was the third director of the Administration for Security and Counterintelligence (UBK), the domestic counter-intelligence and security agency of the Republic of Macedonia.

== Arrest ==
He was arrested in January 2015, and as of May 2015 he is still under arrest by Macedonian authorities under suspicion of two crimes: espionage and assisting in violence towards representatives of the highest state organs. Opposition leader Zoran Zaev was also charged, on January 31, with "conspiring with a foreign intelligence service to topple the government" and foreign diplomats are also allegedly involved in the alleged coup d'état.

Government offices
| Preceded by Dobri Velichkovski | Director of the Administration for Security and Counterintelligence; 1998–1998 | Succeeded by Bojan Bojanovski |
