= Corruption in North Macedonia =

Corruption in North Macedonia is a systemic issue. According to Transparency International's Global Corruption Barometer 2013, corruption is a large concern in the public sector as more than half of the surveyed households consider Parliament, police, public officials, and particularly the judiciary and political parties very corrupt.

On Transparency International's 2025 Corruption Perceptions Index, which scored 180 countries on a scale from 0 ("highly corrupt") to 100 ("very clean"), North Macedonia scored 40. When ranked by score, North Macedonia ranked 84th among the 182 countries in the Index, where the country ranked first is perceived to have the most honest public sector. For comparison with regional scores, the best score among Eastern European and Central Asian countries (Note: Albania, Armenia, Azerbaijan, Belarus, Bosnia and Herzegovina, Georgia, Kazakhstan, Kosovo, Kyrgyzstan, Moldova, Montenegro, North Macedonia, Russia, Serbia, Tajikistan, Turkey, Turkmenistan, Ukraine, Uzbekistan) was 50, the average score was 34 and the worst score was 17. For comparison with worldwide scores, the best score was 89 (ranked 1), the average score was 42, and the worst score was 9 (ranked 181, in a two-way tie).

The business environment in North Macedonia is negatively affected by corruption. Several sources indicate that corruption is considered an obstacle to doing business, and businessmen have reported that bribery is demanded sometimes during public procurement and contracting.

== Anti-corruption efforts ==
The European Commission Progress Report 2013 indicates some positive developments regarding North Macedonia's law enforcement and corruption prevention activities.

== See also ==
- 2016 Macedonian protests
