= Nikola Kljusev =

1st prime minister of Macedonia

- Никола Кљусев
- Nikola Kljusev as prime minister promoting the first Macedonian currency in 1992

Prime Minister of Macedonia
- In office March 20, 1991 – September 4, 1992
- President: Kiro Gligorov
- Preceded by: None
- Succeeded by: Branko Crvenkovski

Personal details
- Born: October 2, 1927 Štip, Kingdom of Serbs, Croats, and Slovenes
- Died: January 16, 2008 (aged 80) Skopje, Macedonia
- Party: VMRO-DPMNE (1997)

Nikola Kljusev (Macedonian: Никола Кљусев; October 2, 1927 – January 16, 2008) was a Macedonian politician and professor of economics who served as the first Prime Minister of the Republic of Macedonia (now North Macedonia) from March 20, 1991, to September 4, 1992, following the country's independence from Yugoslavia in 1991.

== Early life and education ==
Nikola Kljusev was born in Štip, Kingdom of Serbs, Croats, and Slovenes (now North Macedonia), on October 2, 1927. Kljusev was imprisoned in Goli Otok. He graduated from the University of Belgrade's Faculty of Economics in 1953, before obtaining his doctorate in economics at the same university in 1964. He was the best man of Jordan Mijalkov, the first interior minister of Macedonia.

== Economics ==
After graduating, Kljusev began his career as an assistant at the Institute for Industrial Scientific Research. In 1961, he switched to the Economics Institute in Skopje and later served as its director. Kljusev became an associate professor of the University of Skopje's Faculty of Economics in 1968 before becoming a regular professor in 1972. He became the dean of the faculty in 1985, serving until 1987. Kljusev was elected as a member of the Macedonian Academy of Arts and Sciences (MANU) in 1988, presiding over the Council of Demographic Research. He authored the books Koristenje na proizvodnite kapaciteti vo industrijata na SR Makedonija (The utilization of SR Macedonian industrial capacity; 1967) and Efektivnost na investicite vo industrijata na SR Makedonija (The productivity of industrial investments in SR Macedonia; 1969), and co-authored Ekonomske funkcije federacije (Economic functions of the federation; 1970), Antiteza (Anti-thesis; 1994), and Pogledi i promeni (Views and changes; 1995).

== Politics ==
Kljusev became the first Prime Minister of Macedonia on March 20, 1991. He contributed to the peaceful establishment of Macedonian statehood during the breakup of Yugoslavia and the Yugoslav Wars. Kljusev was a non-partisan prime minister, and, thus, was not a member of any political party while in office. The government under his leadership introduced the denar as Macedonia's new national currency, established an anti-inflation programme which fixed the currency to the German mark, created the Macedonian army, established an independent National Bank, introduced restrictive fiscal and monetary policies, imposed a wage freeze and a limited price freeze. In July 1992, the deputies of the Macedonian Assembly voted for no-confidence in his government. Branko Crvenkovski succeeded him as prime minister on September 4. He was elected President of the Council of VMRO-DPMNE in 1997. Kljusev returned to public office as the Defence Minister, from 1998 to 2000, in the government led by Prime Minister Ljubčo Georgievski. He advocated for Macedonia's accession into NATO, the deployment of NATO troops in Macedonia, and military cooperation with Albania.

== Death and legacy ==
Nikola Kljusev died in his home in Skopje, Macedonia, on January 16, 2008, at the age of 80. His death was announced by MANU. Macedonia's Assembly and MANU commemorated him.

Kljusev was buried in the Alley of the Great at the Butel cemetery in Skopje, following a funeral officiated by the head of the Macedonian Orthodox Church, Archbishop Stephen of Ohrid. The government of Macedonia declared January 18, 2008, as a national day of mourning. His daughter and granddaughter established the foundation "Memorial Center Nikola Kljusev". He was honoured posthumously with the Order 8-September by the Macedonian president Gjorge Ivanov in March 2011 for his contribution to the development of the independent Macedonian state. The Municipality of Štip posthumously honoured him with the Order "Saint Nicholas" (St. Nikola) in December 2019.

Political offices
New title	Prime Minister of the Republic of Macedonia; 1991–1992	Succeeded by Branko Crvenkovski
Preceded by Lazar Kitanovski	Minister of Defense; 1998–2000	Succeeded by Ljuben Paunovski
