= Murtino =

Coordinates: 41°25′N 22°44′E

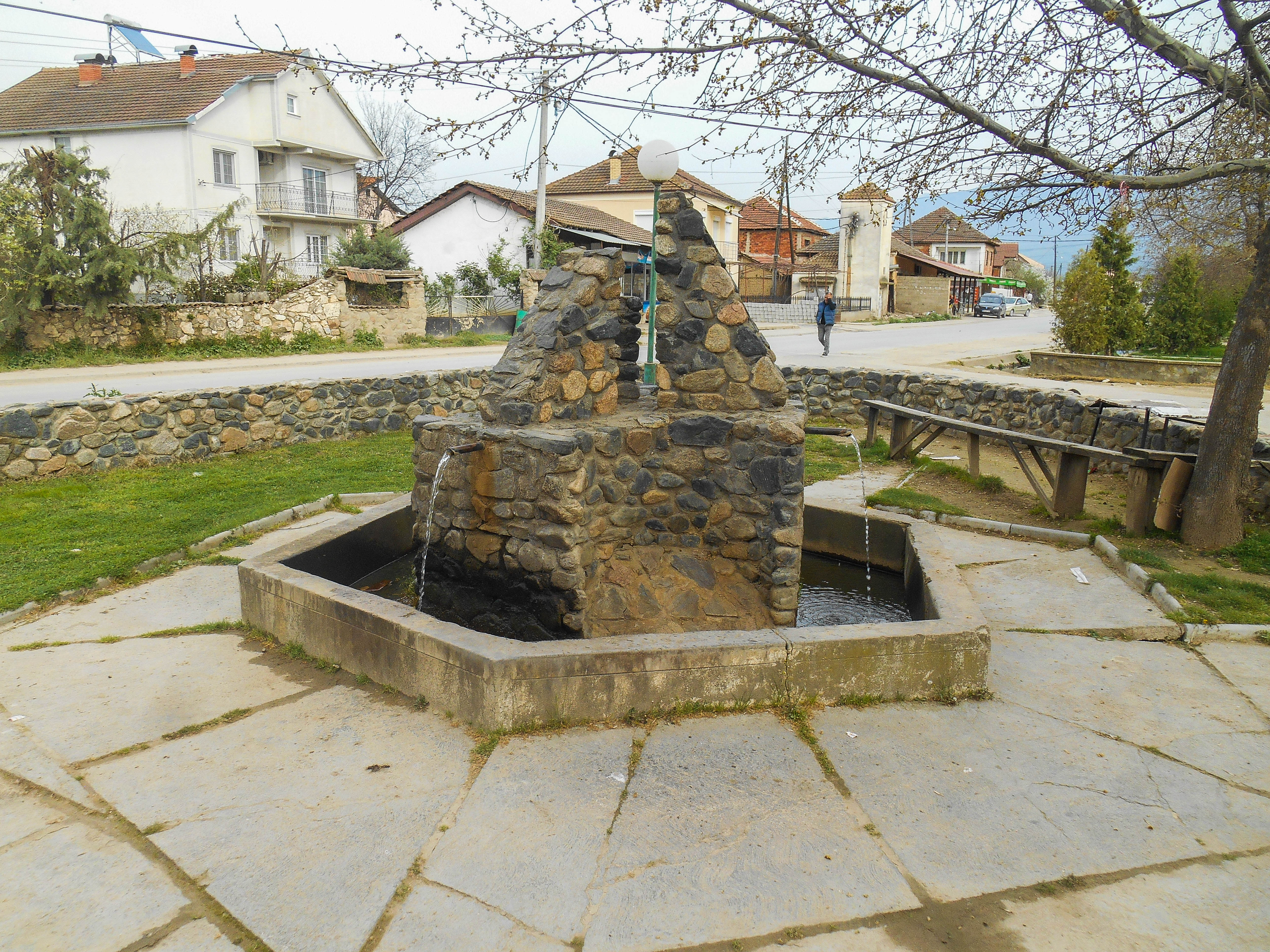
The village pump in Murtino.

Murtino (Macedonian: Муртино) is a village in North Macedonia, in the Strumica Municipality. Its FIPS code was MK68.

== Notable people ==
- Zoran Zaev, Prime Minister of North Macedonia
- Boris Trajkovski, president of the Republic of Macedonia from 1999 to 2004
