= Sašo Mijalkov =

Macedonian intelligence chief

- Сашо Мијалков

9th Director of the Administration for Security and Counterintelligence
- In office August 29, 2006 – May 12, 2015
- Preceded by: Mile Zečević
- Succeeded by: Ljupčo Andonovski

Director of Military Service for Security and Intelligence
- In office 1998–2000

Personal details
- Born: Sašo Mijalkov; September 15, 1965 (age 61) Skopje, SFR Yugoslavia
- Education: Ss. Cyril and Methodius University of Skopje

Sašo Mijalkov (born 15 September 1965) was the ninth director of the Administration for Security and Counterintelligence (UBK) of the Republic of Macedonia.

== Family ==
Sašo Mijalkov is the son of Jordan Mijalkov, the first Interior Minister of the Republic of Macedonia. He is first cousin of Nikola Gruevski the former Prime Minister of the Republic of Macedonia. He is married to Aleksandra Mijalkova.

== Education ==
Mijalkov holds an Economy degree from Ss. Cyril and Methodius University of Skopje and a master's degree from Prague University.

== Career ==
From 1998 till 2000 Mijalkov was employed in the Ministry of Defense of Macedonia, from 2000 till 2001 he was adviser to the Prime Minister of the Republic of Macedonia, and from August 29, 2006 to May 12, 2015 he was the Director of UBK.

A report by the Organized Crime and Corruption Reporting Project states Mijalkov fails to report his investments as required by law.

In April 2022, Mijalkov was added to the US Treasury's Specially Designated Nationals List of individuals facing Balkans-related sanctions.

== See also ==
- Law enforcement in the Republic of Macedonia

Government offices
Preceded by Mile Zachevikj	Director of Administration for Security and Counterintelligence (2006-2015)	Succeeded by Ljupco Andonovski
Preceded by ?	Director of Military Service for Security and Intelligence (????-????)	Succeeded by ?
