= Mile Janakieski =

Macedonian politician

Mile Janakieski is a Republic of Macedonia politician. He served as Minister of Transport and Communications in the cabinet of Prime Minister Nikola Gruevski until 12 May 2015.

== Biography ==
In fall 2009 Janakieski offered his resignation to Prime Minister Gruevski after the 2009 Lake Ohrid boat accident. Gruevski however refused to accept.

He resigned in the wake of the 2015 Macedonian protests, citing the political crisis as reason for his resignation. Prime Minister Gruevski praised Janakieski for liberalizing the telecom market, reducing phone and data costs, and starting construction of three highways and a railway to Bulgaria. Janakieski was succeeded as Minister by Vlado Misajlovski on 13 May 2015. On 12 February 2016, the special prosecution for organized criminal in Skopje lifted accusation against Mile Janakieski and 8 other persons for falsifying elections and criminal association.

In 2021, Janakieski was convicted in 2021 and sentenced to up to 6.5 years' imprisonment for his role in organizing the 2017 storming of the Macedonian Parliament. He was ordered released by a court in Skopje in 2025, citing a 2018 amnesty law.
