= 2018–2019 Bosnian protests =

Protests in the Republic of Srpska over the Death of David Dragičević

2018–2019 Bosnia protests
- Date: 25 March 2018 – 20 July 2019
- Location: Bosnia and Herzegovina
- Caused by: Death of David Dragičević; Police brutality; Injustice; Racism; Corruption
- Goals: Resignation of government; Fresh general elections; Investigation into the Death of David Dragičević
- Methods: Demonstrations, Strike action
- Result: Protests suppressed by force; Peaceful protests dwindle as force in used

The 2018–2019 Bosnian protests were daily peaceful demonstrations and protests in the Republic of Srpska after the Death of David Dragičević, a young Serb student who drowned himself, according to local police, however, his family suggested that he was forced to drown himself by local authorities. This incident triggered an anti-police brutality protest movement and swelled into an anti-government uprising, demanding the end of the minister of The Republic of Srpska.

== Background ==
Mass unrest erupted in Bosnia in 2013 against the government, but the initial public protests were the JMBG protests, against a law on babies. Another wave of violent demonstrations were in the 2014 unrest in Bosnia and Herzegovina by workers against low payments and unemployment. After a death in 2016, Bosnians were fed up and led a wave of rallies for a month. The movement was peaceful but protesters were angry. They even got angrier after the Death of David Dragičević so larger crowds came and protested, demanding justice and daily, they come and lit candles in vigils in support and memory of David. Serbs are also feeling a bit discriminated and disappointed with the regional government.

== Protests ==
After the news broke out, mass protests and peaceful demonstrations, demanding justice took place surrounding the area he had been murdered. Thousands marched daily and chanted slogans against the president and government, demanding democratic reforms and free elections, in reference to the upcoming 2018 Bosnian general election. Thousands protested again in April, demanding an investigation and apology over the death. In September, after a wave of anger in March–April, rallies by students and families against the government and police brutality erupted and boiled into a movement nationwide, starting in Banja Luka, then Zenica, Tuzla, Mostar and Sarajevo. A popular series of bloodless protests and mass strikes by workers took place in December–January, while protests were taking place in Mongolia and Sudanese Revolution. These demonstrators were demanding the arrests of the policemen involved in the incident and not to cover-up the death. The rounds of demonstrations are the longest yet largest yet most bloodless protests Bosnia has seen since the Bosnian War. Mass protests re-erupted in June–July and October–November against abuses and use of force by police, demanding an end to the government as well.

== Further Protests and Dzenan Memic protests ==
Mass protests took place in rallies in Sarajevo, demanding justice over the death of Dzenan Memic, who died in 2016. The protests took place days before the 2018 Bosnian general election. They were suppressed by force from policemen. In November 2019, police brutality rioting and popular demonstrations after an orphanage scandal erupted, when children were Locked up and were threatened to death. Many of them were subjected to police brutality so protesters took to the streets, protesting in street protests fighting for justice. One of the slogans were ‘Too late, I want Justice’!

== See also ==
- 2014 unrest in Bosnia and Herzegovina
- JMBG protests
- Bosnian war
