= Nikola Gruevski =

Prime minister of Macedonia from 2006 to 2016

- Никола Груевски
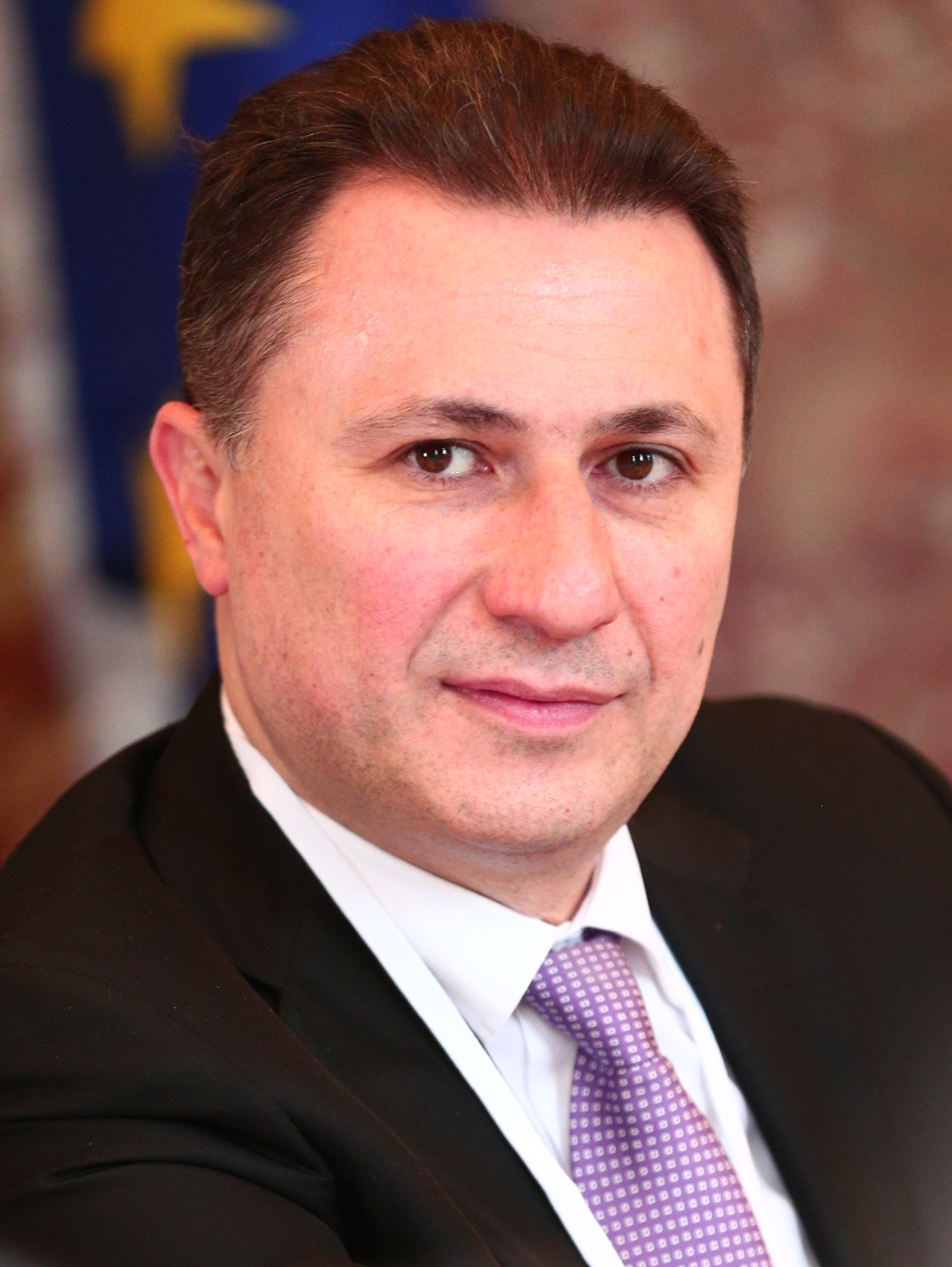
- Gruevski in 2015

Prime Minister of Macedonia
- In office 27 August 2006 – 18 January 2016
- President: Branko Crvenkovski; Gjorge Ivanov
- Preceded by: Vlado Bučkovski
- Succeeded by: Emil Dimitriev

Leader of the Opposition
- In office 31 May 2017 – 23 December 2017
- President: Gjorge Ivanov
- Preceded by: Zoran Zaev
- Succeeded by: Hristijan Mickoski

Minister of Finance
- In office 27 December 1999 – 11 January 2002
- Prime Minister: Ljubčo Georgievski
- Preceded by: Boris Stojmenov
- Succeeded by: Petar Gosev

Personal details
- Born: 31 August 1970 (age 56) Skopje, SR Macedonia, SFR Yugoslavia
- Citizenship: Macedonian
- Party: VMRO-DPMNE
- Children: 2
- Education: St. Clement of Ohrid University in Bitola; Ss. Cyril and Methodius University in Skopje

Nikola Gruevski (Note: Macedonian: Никола Груевски, pronounced ['nikɔla 'ɡruɛfski]) (born 31 August 1970) is a former Macedonian politician who served as Prime Minister of Macedonia from 2006 until his resignation in 2016, in accordance with the internationally mediated Pržino Agreement due to the Macedonian political crisis, and led the party VMRO-DPMNE from 2004 to 2017. He was the longest serving post-independence Macedonian prime minister, serving more than nine years in office.

He instigated the controversial identity politics called antiquization and the project Skopje 2014. His rule in Macedonia (now North Macedonia) contributed to democratic backsliding and the regime he led was authoritarian. His government was responsible for the illegal wiretapping of 20,000 people in the country. In May 2018, he was sentenced to two years in prison on corruption charges, but in November 2018 he fled to Hungary, where he was granted political asylum. He has been also convicted in absentia.

== Early life and ancestry ==
Born in Skopje, Socialist Federal Republic of Yugoslavia, on 31 August 1970, Gruevski was raised in a family that was neither privileged nor poor. His father (born in northern Greece) worked in furniture and design, and his mother was a nurse. After his parents' divorce, he was raised by his mother. When he was four, his mother went to work in Libya, like thousands of other Yugoslav citizens, and took him with her. After their return, he completed primary and secondary education in Skopje. Having graduated from the Faculty of Economics in Prilep of the St. Clement of Ohrid University in Bitola in 1994 (where he practiced amateur theater and boxing).

Gruevski's paternal grandparents were from the Ottoman Macedonian village of Krušoradi (later Achlada) in the Manastir Vilayet, where his grandfather Nikolaos Grouios (Nikola Gruev) was born. Gruevski's grandfather, as part of the Greek army, fought in the Greco-Italian War and was killed by Italian forces during the Italian invasion of Albania. His name is mentioned on the war memorial in Achlada among the names of the locals who were killed during World War II. During the Greek Civil War, Gruevski's family fled to the Socialist Republic of Macedonia, like thousands of other Slavs in Greek Macedonia. They changed their surname to obtain Yugoslav citizenship through assimilation. His family had gained political influence during the 1970s and 1980s, mostly through Gruevski's uncle, Jordan Mijalkov, who worked as the director of a large Macedonian trading company, and later as the first Minister of Interior of the Republic of Macedonia, had extensive contacts with the Yugoslav security services. His family lost its political influence, including connections to oligarchs and secret service, after the death of Jordan Mijalkov.

== Career ==
=== Finance and entry into politics ===
Gruevski entered Republic of Macedonia's new finance sector, and was the first person to trade on Skopje's stock exchange. During 1995, he worked as the director of department in Multigroup-owned Balkanbank, and worked as its exhibitioner until 1998. In 1996, he also acquired qualifications for the international capital market from a London Securities Institute. He founded the Brokerage Association of Macedonia in 1998 and made the first transaction on the Macedonian Stock Exchange. Gruevski established contact with members of the nationalist party VMRO-DPMNE. In 1996, he entered politics, becoming a local councillor in Skopje. In the next year, he began writing about economics. In 1998, he was the minister of trade, and in December 1999, he became the minister of finance in the government of Ljubčo Georgievski. He introduced value-added tax, flat tax and returned property seized by the communists. In this period, Gruevski managed to gain personal contacts and resources to begin his own rise to power. Gruevski served as a minister until 2002.

Gruevski was the president of the State Securities and Exchange Commission from 2000 to 2002. He was also the president of the Parliamentary Committee for cooperation with the European Parliament from 2002 to 2003. In 2003, he worked as an advisor to the Minister of Finance of Serbia within a USAID project for strengthening the capacity of the Ministry of Finance and transferring experience from the countries in transition to Serbia. After serving as its deputy president, he became the president of VMRO-DPMNE in May 2003. He was a member of the Macedonian parliament from September 2002 to August 2006. Gruevski had the reputation of a reformist and pro-European politician in comparison with the more radical wing of Ljubčo Georgievski, who opposed the Ohrid Framework Agreement and advocated partitioning the country between Macedonians and Albanians. Georgievski left the party to form his own party, VMRO – People's Party. Social Democratic Union of Macedonia's government passed the Law on Decentralization (which enabled Albanians to gain more municipalities with ethnic Albanian majorities) in 2004 amid strong opposition from VMRO-DPMNE's supporters and Gruevski, who accused SDSM of treason.

=== Prime Minister (2006–2016) ===
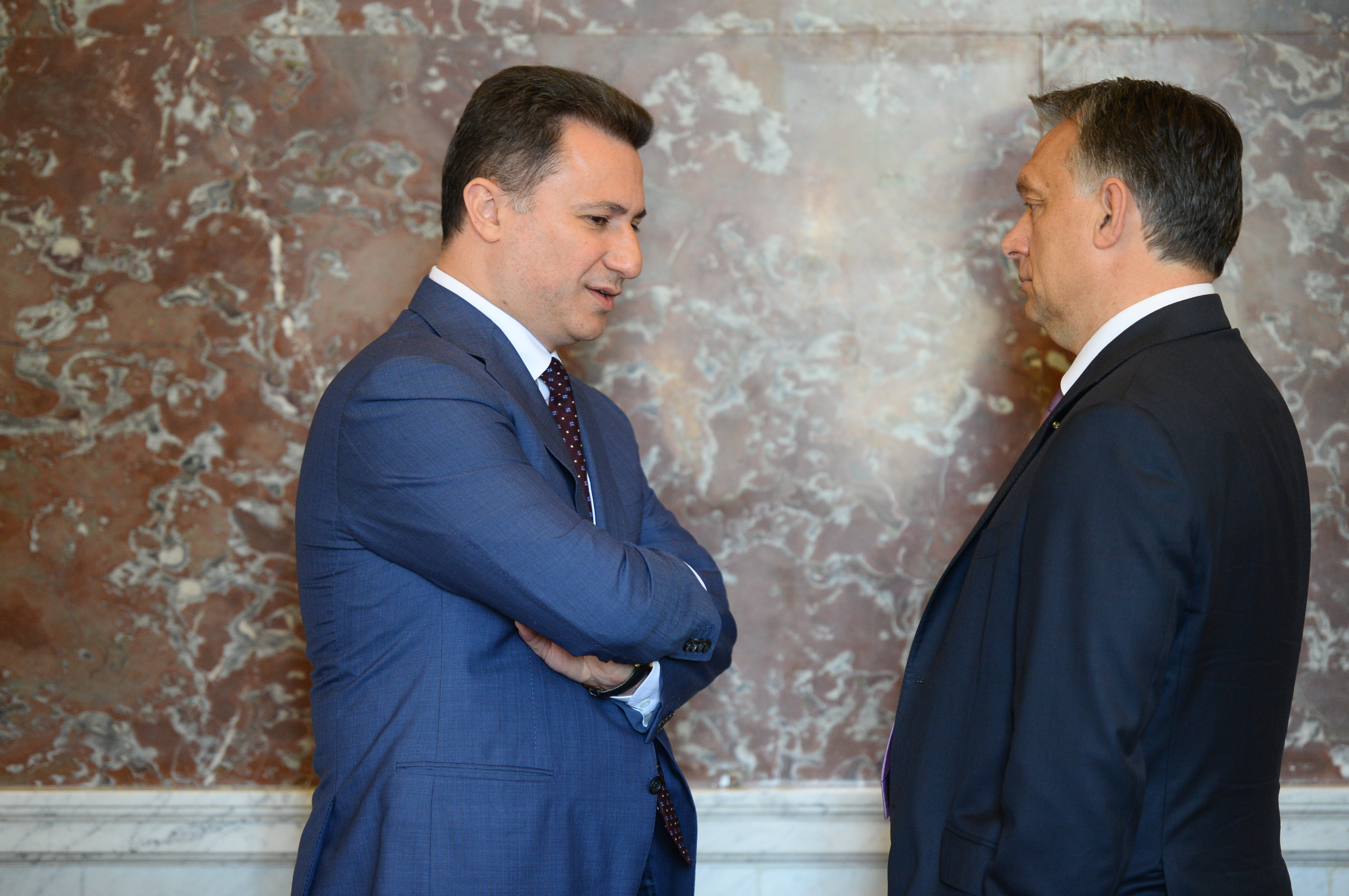
Gruevski and Hungarian Prime Minister Viktor Orbán, Brussels, 25 June 2015

After winning the 2006 election, Gruevski created a government with the Democratic Party of Albanians on 28 August 2006. His government included many people in their thirties as ministers. Vowing to focus on economic progress and job creation, Gruevski also vowed to deal with corruption and work towards Macedonia's entry into NATO and the EU. At the beginning of his mandate, Gruevski created Invest in Macedonia, an agency that promoted the country as a safe haven for global finance. Gruevski directly made business deals, with the goal of bringing to Macedonia 138 factories and 62,700 new jobs, consisting of more than €3.8 billion of investment.

Gruevski assigned his first cousin Sašo Mijalkov as the leader of the Administration for Security and Counterintelligence, and placed his other cousin Vlatko Mijalkov in the Customs Administration. In 2006, he obtained a master's degree from the Faculty of Economics at the Ss. Cyril and Methodius University in Skopje with the thesis "Foreign Direct Investments, Economic Development and Employment". His decision not to include in government the largest ethnic Albanian party, Democratic Union for Integration (DUI), caused protests. The party ended up boycotting the parliament throughout 2007. According to The Economist, his first years had economic growth and a focus on the economy. Per economic analyst Branimir Jovanovikj in 2015, growth during Gruevski's rule from 2007 to 2013 was 2.6%, lower than the growth before he came to power when the average GDP growth from 2002 to 2006 was 3.5%. Balkan Insight reported that GDP grew around 5% in 2007 and 2008. The Macedonian Encyclopedia also reported that the GDP was 5.9% in 2007.

His government initiated a policy of antiquization, depicting the Macedonian nation-state as originating from the ancient period. Gruevski's historical negationism divided ethnic Macedonians between opponents and supporters of the myth of ancient origin. In the 2008 Bucharest NATO summit, Greece vetoed Macedonia's NATO accession, because of the Macedonia naming dispute. After the summit, Gruevski launched a case against it to the International Court of Justice (ICJ). Later, Greece also blocked the start of Macedonia's EU accession negotiations. Per political scientist Florian Bieber, it is "this rejection by NATO and the EU that pushed the Macedonian government toward an authoritarian path". The coalition led by his party, VMRO-DPMNE, won the 1 June 2008 parliamentary election, their second electoral victory in a row, winning more than half of the seats in the parliament. His party campaigned for EU and NATO membership. This time, Gruevski created a government with DUI.

He transformed himself into a hard-line Macedonian nationalist. Gruevski presented himself as a political outsider who came to power to defend the dignity of "ordinary people" who were discriminated by political elites. Glorification of the people and anti-elitism became part of his rhetorical demagogy. Gruevski portrayed himself as the toughest defender of Macedonia's name and identity, and adopted a hard-line stance towards Greece. Gruevski's government isolated and undermined journalists and news outlets which were regarded as critical of VMRO-DPMNE and him. This crackdown on independent media resulted in criticism against his government within and outside Macedonia due to the increased level of authoritarianism and illiberalism. Like other populists, Gruevski did not like criticism from the media, which he perceived as "elite subversion of the will of the people".

In 2011, Gruevski's government initiated a reconstruction of Skopje in a project called Skopje 2014. His government launched a campaign labelling anyone opposing the project as a traitor of national interests, a "Sorosoid" and a Greek mercenary. VMRO-DPMNE won again in the election on 5 June 2011, permitting him to remain in power. In 2011, ICJ ruled that Greece violated the Interim Agreement by blocking Macedonia's membership to NATO since 2008. However, the ruling was ignored by Greece. On 6 January 2012, Gruevski admitted that he personally was the instigator of the Skopje 2014 project.

The US Department of State in its 2013 "Macedonia Human Rights Report" reported that the mainstream media rarely published views against the government. The elections on 27 April 2014 were also won by VMRO-DPMNE. SDSM did not recognize the results and boycotted the parliament due to electoral fraud. In 2014, Gruevski began to rush plans through parliament to create a tax-free autonomous trade zone that falls outside the purview of both domestic and international regulators. The move raised alarm among government critics and some supporters of Gruevski as it sounded like a license to commit financial crimes. The European Union's Venice Commission commented that "If all laws (other than criminal laws) are to be enacted and enforced by a managing body rather than the constitutionally recognised lawmaker and executive, this zone becomes a sort of a 'State within a State' separate from the existing constitutional structure" and could become "a haven for 'dirty money.'" The World Media Freedom Index 2014 by the organization Reporters Without Borders ranked Macedonia in the 123rd place out of 179 countries.

In 2015, the former prime minister and founder of the VMRO-DPMNE, Ljubčo Georgievski accused Gruevski's government of having a goal to serbianize the country, and join it to Serbia. However, a political analyst disputed this argument and made the accusation that there was bulgarianization instead for favoring Bulgarian historical figures.

SDSM demonstrated in 2015 that Gruevski and Mijalkov were responsible for the illegal wiretapping of 20,000 people in Macedonia, including journalists, politicians and religious figures. Gruevski had wiretapped allies and opponents. The wiretaps revealed a rule based on manipulative electoral results, privatization of the public administration and the regulatory bodies, and massive violations of privacy. They also showed that Gruevski and his VMRO-DPMNE had full control over the judiciary, actively intervened in court decisions, made political deals over appointments of judges, kept records of favorable and unfavorable judges, and gave promotions based on partisan loyalty. In May 2015, mass protests begun due to the reveal about the wiretapping scheme. The wiretapping scandal caused over two years of political crisis. Despite the scandal, Gruevski's government still had popular support. In response to the crisis, Gruevski accused the opposition of organizing a coup and improved ties with Russia, which became more active regarding Macedonia and openly criticized the protesters. In April 2015, the mayor of the municipality of Centar, Andrej Žernovski, filed a criminal complaint against Gruevski for inciting and planning aggression for a June 2013 incident when a large group of citizens broke windows of the municipal building. Gruevski had ordered 2,000 people to be brought to the municipality of Centar, saying "someone from the crowd should come out and give him (Žernovski) 5-6 strong slaps".

An investigation in 2015 conducted by experts led by German jurist Reinhard Priebe, hired by the European Commission, concluded that his government misused the security service "to control top officials in the public administration, prosecutors, judges and political opponents." The European Commission described the country as being under state capture during the crisis. During this period, the country experienced democratic backsliding due to the monopolization of power and abuse of state institutions and resources, which in turn affected the electoral process, human rights, values of liberal democracy and the rule of law. Between 2 June and 15 July 2015, the European Union intervened by mediating the Pržino Agreement between the Macedonian government and the main political parties in the country, to end the political crisis. This agreement called for the early resignation of Gruevski. He resigned from his premiership on 14 January 2016.

Per doctor of international relations and history of diplomacy Gurakuç Kuçi, the party had followed a significant pro-Serbian and pro-Russian policy under Gruevski's leadership. Per political scientist Vassilis Petsinis, Gruevski, who was a former ally of the US-led war on terror, gradually turned Macedonia away from the Western world towards Russia. Bieber stated that Gruevski's government never formally abandoned the goal of Euro-Atlantic integration, preserving its association with the European People's Party. Gruevski has maintained close relations with Serbian president Aleksandar Vučić and Hungarian prime minister Viktor Orbán. The latter has opposed the Prespa agreement between Greece and Macedonia, and supported VMRO-DPMNE's hardline position against it.

== Post-premiership (since 2016) ==
The country's president and close ally of Gruevski, Gjorge Ivanov, disregarded the Pržino Agreement and pardoned all people involved in the wiretapping scandal on 12 April 2016. However, the decision caused mass protests (known as "Colorful Revolution"). Due to domestic and international pressure, a month later, Ivanov revoked the pardons. Mass protests continued until July when the EU mediated between the political parties again until a new agreement was reached. This time, it was decided that early elections would take place on 11 December 2016. Gruevski won his fourth parliamentary election in a row in December 2016.

In January 2017, the Macedonian Special Prosecutor's Office launched the 'Tank' investigation in which two individuals were accused of using their official position and authority in the period from February to October 2012 to complete an illegal public procurement of an armored Mercedes-Benz car worth €600,000 and "fulfil the wishes" of Gruevski who was prime minister at the time. SDSM formed a new coalition government in 2017 under Zoran Zaev. In July 2017, a Macedonian court ordered the seizure of the passports of Gruevski and four other officials of his party, including former interior minister Gordana Jankuloska and former transportation minister Mile Janakieski, in connection with the wiretapping case.

In December 2017, Gruevski resigned from the party's leadership, following the party's major defeat by SDSM in local elections. He portrayed foreign ambassadors and George Soros as external forces threatening Macedonia. On 23 May 2018, Gruevski was sentenced to two years in prison for unlawfully influencing government officials in the purchase of the Mercedes. In June 2018, he received a PhD from the Economics Faculty of University of Cyril and Methodius in Skopje.

The parliament failed to remove his mandate as a member of parliament. On 9 November 2018, the Skopje Criminal Court rejected Gruevski's appeals for a postponement of his prison sentence and on 10 November he did not appear for the start of his two-year sentence. The Macedonian authorities issued an arrest warrant against him.

=== Fugitive ===
On 13 November, Gruevski announced through his Facebook account that he had fled to Hungary, where he applied for political asylum. Despite his passport having been confiscated, Gruevski successfully escaped and concerns arose that he probably used a Bulgarian one. However, according to Bulgarian authorities, Gruevski has never applied for Bulgarian citizenship. It was later confirmed by Albanian police that, with the aid of the Hungarian government which escorted him using Hungarian diplomatic vehicles, Gruevski had passed through Albania, Montenegro and Serbia, before arriving in Hungary.

Interpol alerted that Gruevski is wanted under an international arrest warrant and the Macedonian government filed a formal extradition request. Hungary's opposition parties called on the Hungarian government to arrest and quickly extradite Gruevski to Macedonia.

On 20 November 2018, Gruevski was granted political asylum by the Hungarian authorities. He has condemned the Prespa agreement and stated that Prime Minister Zoran Zaev "scammed" and "tricked" the Macedonian people over the name change of the country and that Greek politicians imposed an unfavorable deal upon Macedonia that outlines exclusive claims over "antique history" by Greece. Gruevski has also opposed the Friendship Treaty with Bulgaria from 2017.

On 27 June 2019, Gruevski appeared handcuffed in a court in Budapest in a hearing closed for the public for his extradition requested by North Macedonia. Later that day the court in Budapest announced that his extradition was rejected. According to the judge, the conditions needed for his extradition were not fulfilled. According to Balkan Investigative Reporting Network's analysis of data from the country's finance ministry in November 2019, 95% of the €26.6 million spent on media by Gruevski's government were transferred to three private national broadcasters – Sitel (10.2 million), Kanal 5 (8.5 million) and Alfa TV (6.3 million). All three served as the mouthpieces of his government. Gruevski's closest allies and the owners and editors of the three channels also had close ties.

On 21 July 2020, Gruevski's position as an honorary president of VMRO-DPNME was removed as part of the policy to democratize the party. In October 2020, he was named in a new money laundering probe launched by the authorities in North Macedonia. In September 2020, the Skopje Criminal Court sentenced him in absentia to a year and a half in prison, after he and Mile Janakieski were found guilty of inciting the attack on the Centar municipality from June 2013.

On 19 March 2021, German politician Tobias Zech resigned from the Bundestag due to allegations that he received a large sum of money to campaign for Gruevski. After Gruevski escaped to Hungary, Zech continued business relations with North Macedonia through cannabis-related company PharmCann Deutschland AG in partnership with Zlatko Keskovski, a former counter-intelligence officer of North Macedonia.

In April 2022, the Skopje Criminal Court sentenced him in absentia to seven years in prison for unlawfully acquiring over €1.3 million from VMRO-DPMNE, and instigating a money-laundering scheme to cover his tracks and buy property. Per the verdict, Gruevski used money from donations made to the party, which he obtained between 2006 and 2012, while serving as prime minister, and then used it to buy attractive sites using an offshore company registered in Belize. At the same time, he was added to the US Treasury's Specially Designated Nationals List of individuals facing Balkans-related sanctions and the US Department of State's corruption related sanctions. Gruevski appealed against his April 2022 sentence, but he lost the appeal in 2023, with the Appeals Court raising his sentence to nine years in prison. On 14 July 2026, the Skopje Criminal Court acquitted him for abuse of position to build VMRO-DPMNE's headquarters in Skopje in a retrial. In October 2026, Hungarian politician Ákos Ányos Hadházy requested the removal of his political asylum.

== Personal life ==
Gruevski is fluent in English, while also knowing French and German. His mother is from Štip. She is a sister of Jordan Mijalkov.

In 2019, publishing house Gjurgja from North Macedonia published his book Experiences for the Future – economic effects of the various types of international flows of capital including a particular look at the Republic of Macedonia. The foreword contains inaccurate information about his escape from justice. Gruevski portrayed himself as a victim who could only ask for political asylum to save his own life, repeatedly claiming that there was political persecution against him in his country.

Gruevski divorced his first wife and got married again on 10 May 2007. Former Deputy Prime Minister in charge of Finance, Zoran Stavreski, was his best man. He ended up having two daughters with his second wife. She filed a request for divorce to the Basic Civil Court in Skopje in 2022.

== Awards and recognition ==
=== Recognitions ===
- 2014: Order St. Nicholas – Highest Award of Štip
- 2015: Order Baptist (Preteca) from Saint Jovan Bigorski Monastery

=== Awards ===
- Vienna Economic Forum award – for contribution to national and regional economic development (2011)

== Notes ==
Political offices
Preceded by Boris Stojmenov	Minister of Finance; 1999–2002	Succeeded by Petar Gosev
Preceded by Vlado Bučkovski	Prime Minister of North Macedonia; 2006–2016	Succeeded by Emil Dimitriev
