= Emil Dimitriev =

Prime Minister of Macedonia from 2016 to 2017

- Емил Димитриев
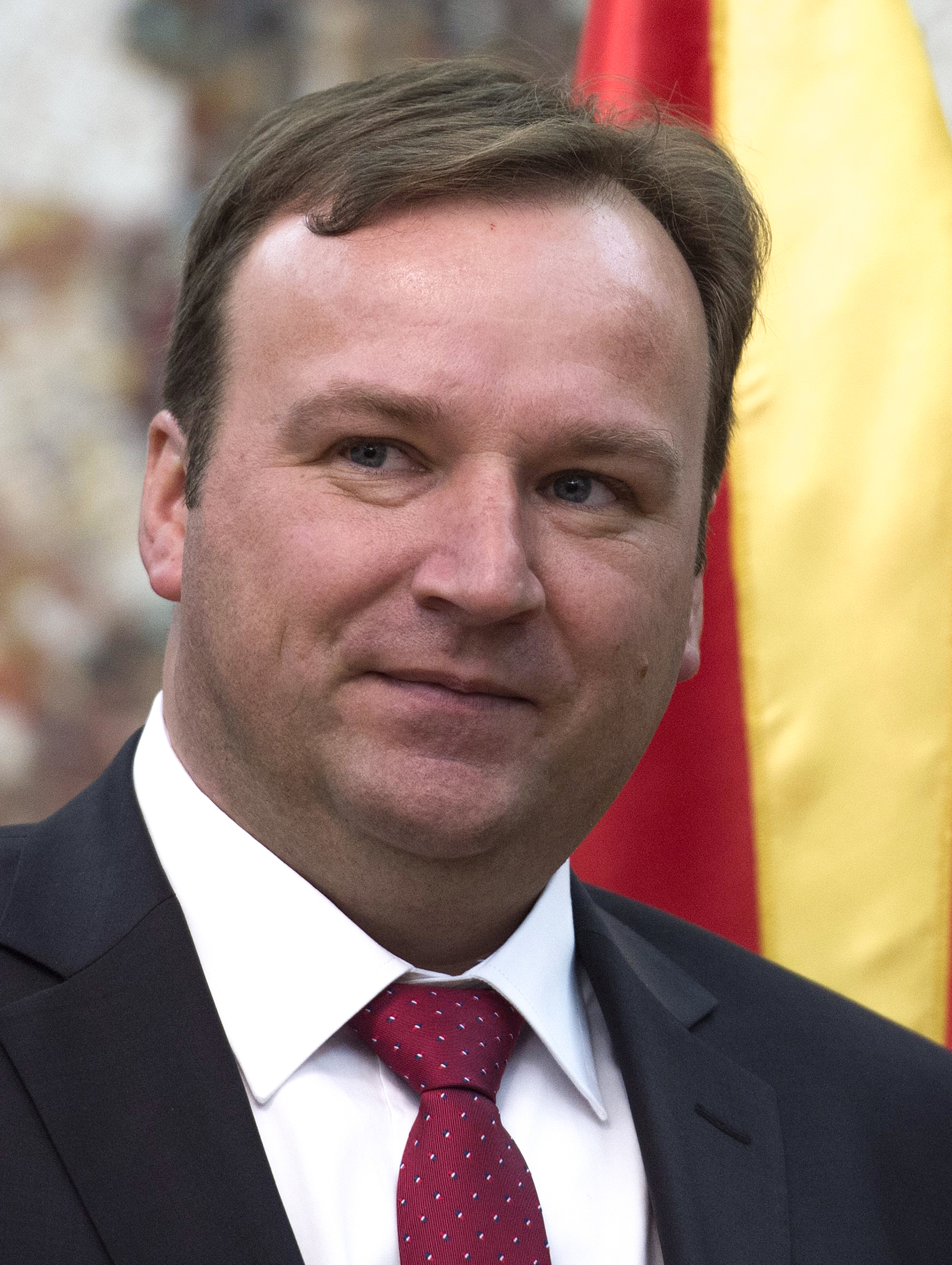
- Dimitriev in 2016

Prime Minister of Macedonia (Technical)
- In office 18 January 2016 – 31 May 2017
- President: Gjorge Ivanov
- Preceded by: Nikola Gruevski
- Succeeded by: Zoran Zaev

Personal details
- Born: 19 March 1979 (age 47) Probištip, Yugoslavia (now North Macedonia)
- Party: VMRO-DPMNE
- Education: Ss. Cyril and Methodius University in Skopje; University of Belgrade

Emil Dimitriev (Macedonian: Емил Димитриев, pronounced ['emil dimit'riɛf]; born 19 March 1979) is a Macedonian conservative politician, sociologist, and general secretary of the VMRO-DPMNE. He served as Prime Minister of Macedonia, following the resignation of Nikola Gruevski, from January 2016 to May 2017.

== Prime minister ==
Dimitriev was nominated in an interim capacity as Prime Minister of Macedonia on 15 January 2016, and he assumed office on 18 January, following the arranged pre-electoral resignation of Nikola Gruevski from the position, as part of the Przino Agreement.

Political offices
Preceded by Nikola Gruevski	Prime Minister of Macedonia; 2016–2017	Succeeded by Zoran Zaev
