= Administration for Security and Counterintelligence =

Counterintelligence and security agency of North Macedonia

- Управа за безбедност и контраразузнавање (УБК); Uprava za bezbednost i kontrarazuznavanje (UBK); Administrata për siguri dhe kundërzbulim (ASK)

Agency overview
- Formed: 1995
- Preceding agencies: State Security Administration; UDBA
- Dissolved: 2019
- Jurisdiction: World
- Headquarters: Skopje, North Macedonia
- Employees: Classified
- Annual budget: Classified
- Ministers responsible: Oliver Spasovski
- Website: www.mvr.gov.mk

The Administration for Security and Counterintelligence (Macedonian: Управа за безбедност и контраразузнавање, romanized: Uprava za bezbednost i kontrarazuznavanje, Albanian: Administrata për siguri dhe kundërzbulim), commonly referred to by the acronym UBK, was the national police domestic intelligence and security of Republic of North Macedonia. Its headquarters were located in Skopje, and the agency was under the jurisdiction of the Ministry of Internal Affairs.

The agency was founded in the People's Republic of Macedonia under the name Department for People's Protection OZNA, as the official security agency in the Macedonian socialist republic. Officially, the Administration for Security and Counterintelligence, was founded in 1995 under the name Directorate for Security and Counterintelligence.

This agency was succeeded by the National Security Agency.

== Directors ==
#	Portrait	Name	Mandate commenced on	Mandate finished on	Political Party
Before 1991 see: UDBA; State Security Administration (Macedonian: Служба за Државна Безбедност)
1		Slobodan Bogoevski	1991	1995	SDSM
Directorate for Security and Counterintelligence (Macedonian: Дирекција за Безбедност и Контраразузнавање)
2		Dobri Veličkovski	1995	1998	SDSM
3		Zoran Veruševski	1998	1998	none
4		Bojan Bojanovski	1998	2001	Democratic Alternative
5		Goran Mitevski	2001	2002	VMRO-DPMNE
6		Nikola Spasovski	2002	2003	VMRO-DPMNE
7		Siljan Avramovski	2003	2004	SDSM
Administration for Security and Counterintelligence (Macedonian: Управа за Безбедност и Контраразузнавање)
8		Mile Zečević	2004	2006	SDSM
9		Sašo Mijalkov	2006	2015	VMRO-DPMNE
10		Ljupčo Andonovski	2015	2016	VMRO-DPMNE
11		Vladimir Atanasovski	2016	2017	VMRO-DPMNE
12		Goran Nikolovski	2017	2019	none

== See also ==
- North Macedonia
- Intelligence Agency (Civilian Agency)
- Military Service for Security and Intelligence-G2 (Military Agency)
