= Zoran Zaev =

Prime minister of North Macedonia from 2017 to 2022

- Зоран Заев
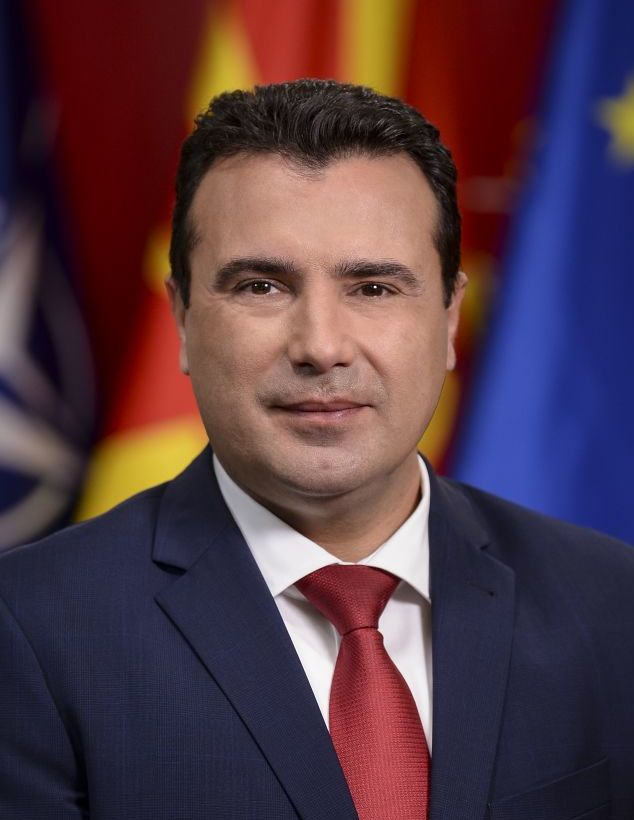
- Official portrait, 2020

Prime Minister of North Macedonia
- In office 30 August 2020 – 16 January 2022
- President: Stevo Pendarovski
- Preceded by: Oliver Spasovski
- Succeeded by: Dimitar Kovačevski
- In office 31 May 2017 – 3 January 2020
- President: Gjorge Ivanov; Stevo Pendarovski
- Preceded by: Emil Dimitriev
- Succeeded by: Oliver Spasovski

Leader of the Social Democratic Union
- In office 2 June 2013 – 12 December 2021
- Deputy: Radmila Šekerinska
- Preceded by: Branko Crvenkovski
- Succeeded by: Dimitar Kovačevski

Leader of the Opposition
- In office 2 June 2013 – 31 May 2017
- Preceded by: Branko Crvenkovski
- Succeeded by: Nikola Gruevski

Mayor of Strumica
- In office 22 March 2005 – 22 December 2016
- Preceded by: Kiril Janev
- Succeeded by: Kostadin Kostadinov

Personal details
- Born: 8 October 1974 (age 51) Strumica, SR Macedonia, SFR Yugoslavia (now North Macedonia)
- Party: Social Democratic Union
- Spouse: Zorica Zaeva
- Education: University of Skopje

Zoran Zaev (Macedonian: Зоран Заев, pronounced ['zɔran 'zaɛf]; born 8 October 1974) is a Macedonian economist and politician who served as prime minister of North Macedonia from May 2017 to January 2020, and again from August 2020 to January 2022.

Prior to entering politics, he ran a private business in his hometown of Strumica. In the period 2003–2005, he was a Member of the Parliament of Macedonia, and then he ran for mayor of Strumica Municipality, a position he held for three terms, between 2005 and 2016. After the resignation of Branko Crvenkovski from the leadership of the centre-left Social Democratic Union of Macedonia in 2013, Zaev was appointed the new party leader.

Zaev suffered defeat in the 2014 parliamentary election, after which he made accusations of election rigging and decided for his party to act as a non-parliamentary opposition. In 2015, he published illegally obtained telephone conversations of senior government officials that contained indications of organized crime. In the same year, he signed the Pržino Agreement, which provided for a technical government to hold an early parliamentary election in 2016. Following the early election in 2016, Zaev's party formed a parliamentary majority with DUI and Alliance for Albanians, and their coalition government was elected in May 2017. As prime minister, he has advocated the accession of North Macedonia to the European Union.

He signed the Prespa agreement with Greece, resolving a long-standing dispute over the country name, which led to the accession protocol of North Macedonia to NATO. Zaev is one of the initiators of Mini Schengen Zone, an economic zone of the Western Balkans countries intended to guarantee "four freedoms". Zaev agreed with the major opposition party VMRO-DPMNE on early elections due to stalled EU talks and resigned in January 2020, but after the election, he began his second term as the head of the government. Zaev formally stepped down again after the local elections in October 2021, and was succeeded by Dimitar Kovačevski in January 2022.

== Early life, education and early career ==
Zoran Zaev was born on 8 October 1974 in Strumica. His parents are from the Strumica village of Murtino. The family lived in the village, and moved to Strumica when Zoran was four years old. Strumica is traditionally known as an agrarian region, and Zaev and his family worked in agriculture. In his youth, Zaev spent several summers at the market in the Serbian town of Gornji Milanovac, selling agricultural products from Strumica.

After finishing primary and secondary school in his hometown, Zaev enrolled at the Faculty of Economics at Ss. Cyril and Methodius University of Skopje, where he graduated in 1997. He obtained a master's degree at the same faculty.

Zaev was employed in his family's business in 1997, where in 2001 he was appointed director, and held that position until 2003. From 2000 to 2003, Zaev chaired the board of the public utility enterprise of Strumica.

== Political career ==
Zaev joined the Social Democratic Union of Macedonia (SDSM) in 1996. Zaev was a member of the Macedonian parliament from SDSM from 2003 to 2005.

He served as the party's vice president between 2006 and 2008. He won three consecutive local elections and served as mayor of Strumica from 2005 to 2016. After Branko Crvenkovski stepped down as SDSM's leader in 2013, Zaev was elected as a new leader. In addition, he served as a member of parliament from 2003 to 2005. Following the 2016 parliamentary election, Zaev formed a coalition government with support from the Democratic Union for Integration and the Alliance for Albanians in May 2017.

=== Controversies ===
==== 2015 political crises ====
In January 2015, Prime Minister Nikola Gruevski accused Zaev of an alleged conspiracy with a foreign intelligence service and diplomats to topple the Government, and involvement in the allegedly attempted coup d'état. Zaev subsequently accused Gruevski of wiretapping and illegally spying on at least 20,000 people in the country. The public prosecutor, on the other hand, accused Zaev of blackmailing Gruevski and detained five people connected with that case. The case was later dropped due to insufficient evidence.

Following his election as president of the SDSM, Zaev became leader of the opposition. In that role, Zaev took part in June 2015 in a meeting with Gruevski and Johannes Hahn, the European Union's enlargement commissioner, in order to overcome the political crisis. The negotiations resulted in the Pržino Agreement, which foresaw a caretaker government to organize a snap election in April 2016 and a Special Public Prosecution to investigate the wiretaps scandal. Zaev threatened to boycott the election because of Gruevski's obstruction of the Pržino Agreement and the reforms in the judiciary system and the media.

==== Middle finger ====
Following the Bulgarian veto of the accession of North Macedonia to the European Union in November 2020, Prime Minister Zaev said in a television interview with journalist Borjan Jovanovski on local television station TV 21 that "of course he felt like showing the middle finger to the Bulgarians when he learned about the veto". This comment was criticized by Bulgarian politicians such as Foreign Minister Ekaterina Zaharieva.

==== Exploiting bulgarophobia during elections ====
On multiple occasions Zoran Zaev has been noted to use anti-Bulgarian rhetoric in order to boost his chances during elections. During the Strumica mayoral elections in 2013, he accused his opponent of being a Bulgarian due to his business connections in the country. In addition, Zaev also installed a campaign banner in the centre of Strumica, which said "This is Strumica, this is not Blagoevgrad". Zoran Zaev also posted a picture of this banner on his personal Facebook page.

On another occasion, during the 2021 local elections in North Macedonia, Zaev accused Danela Arsovska of having been a citizen of Bulgaria. According to Zaev at the time, Arsovska was a representative of a foreign country and should withdraw immediately if she loved the people of Skopje. Furthermore, he added that this was a humiliation to the people of Skopje. Shortly after Zaev's statement, a promotional banner of Danela Arsovska was vandalized with the word 'Petrich', a Bulgarian city being plastered on top. Again inferring that Arsovska was a Bulgarian. In addition, there were two press conferences held by Zaev's SDSM party that showed Arsovska's Bulgarian ID documents. The actions by Zoran Zaev and his party were criticised in North Macedonia and Bulgaria.

== Prime minister ==
=== First premiership (2017–2020) ===
On 31 May 2017 the Macedonian parliament confirmed Zaev as the new prime minister, with 62 out of 120 MPs voting in favor. The voting ended months of political uncertainty. During his speech, Zaev presented the program of the new government, saying that joining NATO and the EU would be its priority in the following years. He also promised economic growth and an end to corruption by announcing a "responsible, reformist and European government".

Some newspapers interpreted some of Zaev's statements for the newspapers BGNES and Kurir as a claim asserting the Macedonians as one people with the Bulgarians or the Serbs. What Zaev was recorded as saying on the original video interview of the Bulgarian newspaper BGNES was "I want to send a message to all the citizens of Bulgaria. We are brotherly people, the same folk." He stated during an interview for the Serbian newspaper Kurir, "The Serbs and the Macedonians are brotherly people" and "Nobody asked Zoran Zaev to do anything against Macedonians, against Serbs, against any ethnic community, or against any of our neighbors. We heard allegations asserting Zaev as condemning Serbia for a genocide. It's for me the same my people."

==== Negotiations with Bulgaria for a treaty for friendship and cooperation ====
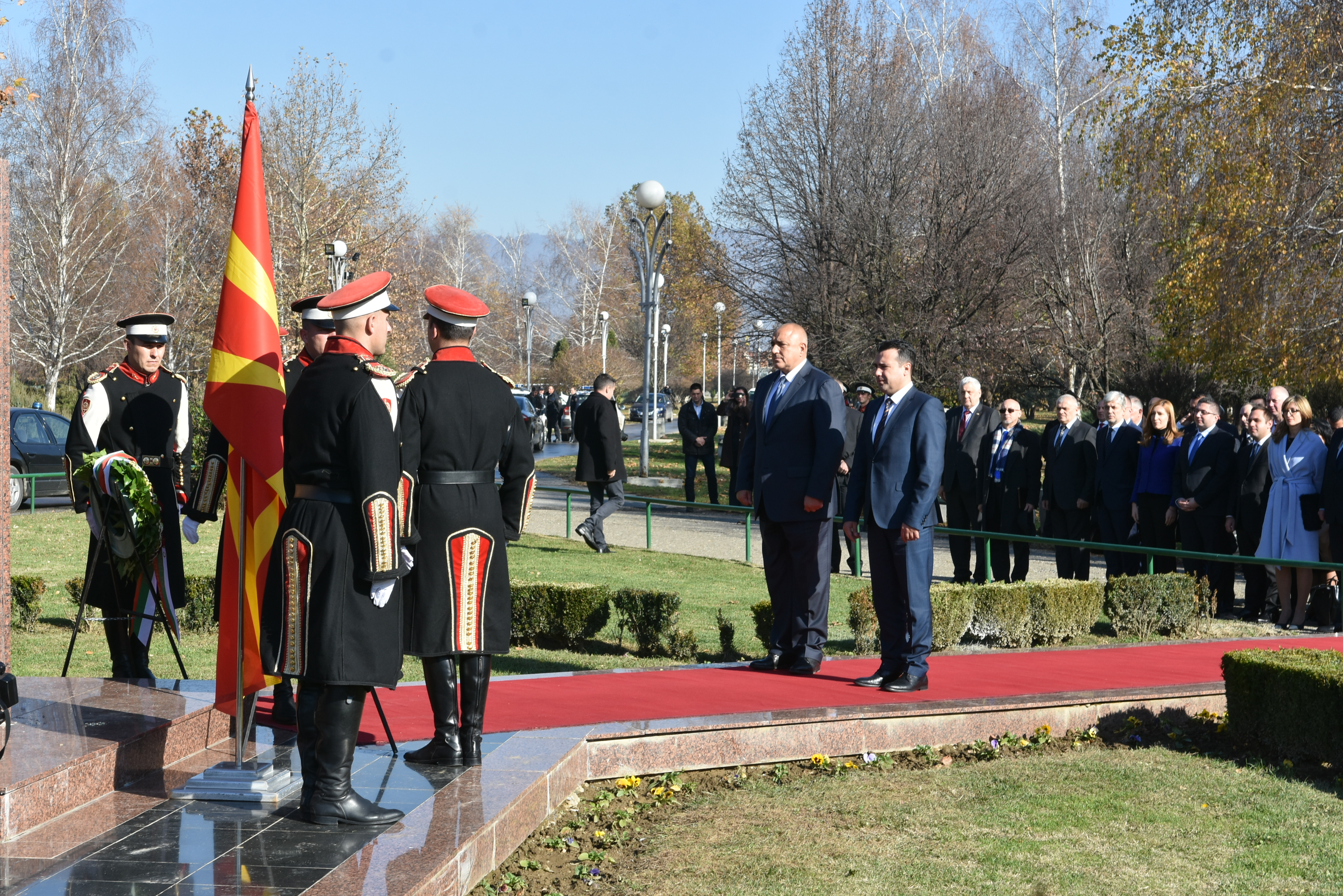
Bulgarian PM Boyko Borisov and Zaev honoring former president of the Republic of Macedonia Boris Trajkovski at his monument in Strumica

North Macedonia and Bulgaria have complicated neighbourly relations. In 2012 Bulgaria joined Greece in blocking Macedonia from obtaining a start date for EU accession talks. Bulgaria has accused Macedonia of discriminating against ethnic Bulgarians and of generating an anti-Bulgarian atmosphere in the country. Prospects for improved relations between the two countries have risen since Zaev-led government took power in Skopje in May 2017. In June in a meeting with Zaev in Sofia, PM Boyko Borisov said Bulgaria would back Macedonia's bid to join the European Union and NATO and would also sign a long-delayed friendship treaty with it. As a result, the two governments signed a friendship treaty to bolster the relations between the two Balkan states on 1 August. It was preceded by 18 years of heavy negotiations. The treaty calls for a committee to "objectively re-examine the common history" of the two countries and envisages both countries will celebrate together events from their shared history. "Macedonia and Bulgaria have a lot of common history and this is the stepping stone for Macedonia's European and Euro-Atlantic future", Zaev said during the ceremony in Skopje. The treaty was ratified by the parliament of the Republic of Macedonia on 15 January 2018 and by the Bulgarian parliament a few days later.

==== Negotiations with Greece for naming dispute ====
During the last years in Opposition and also in his inauguration speech, the new prime minister Zoran Zaev vowed his determination to resolve the decades-old dispute with Greece. Efforts between the governments of the two countries for resolving the name dispute intensified, and on 17 January 2018, UN-sponsored negotiations had resumed, with the Greek and Macedonian ambassadors Adamantios Vassilakis and Vasko Naumovski meeting with the UN Envoy at Washington, who suggested five names in his proposal, all containing the name "Macedonia" transliterated from Cyrillic.

After the Zaev-Tsipras meeting in Davos, Zaev announced that streets and locations such as the Alexander the Great airport in Skopje which were named by the nationalist VMRO-DPMNE after ancient Macedonian heroes and figures such as Alexander the Great, could be renamed as a sign of goodwill towards Greece. Specifically, Zaev declared that the Alexander the Great Highway, the E-75 motorway that connects Skopje to Greece, could be renamed to "Friendship Highway". In exchange, the Greek PM announced that Greece could consent to Macedonia's bid to the Adriatic-Ionian Cooperation Agreement and the Greek Parliament could ratify the second phase of the European Union Association Agreement with Macedonia as part of the accession of North Macedonia to the European Union which was blocked in 2009 by Greece owing to the name dispute.

In late February 2018, the government and institutions of the Republic of Macedonia announced the halt of the Skopje 2014 program, which aimed to make Macedonia's capital have a "more classical appeal" and begun removing its controversial monuments and statues. In Spring 2018, extensive negotiations in a bid to resolve the naming dispute were held in rounds, with frequent meetings of the Foreign Ministers of Greece and Macedonia achieving tangible progress on the naming dispute.

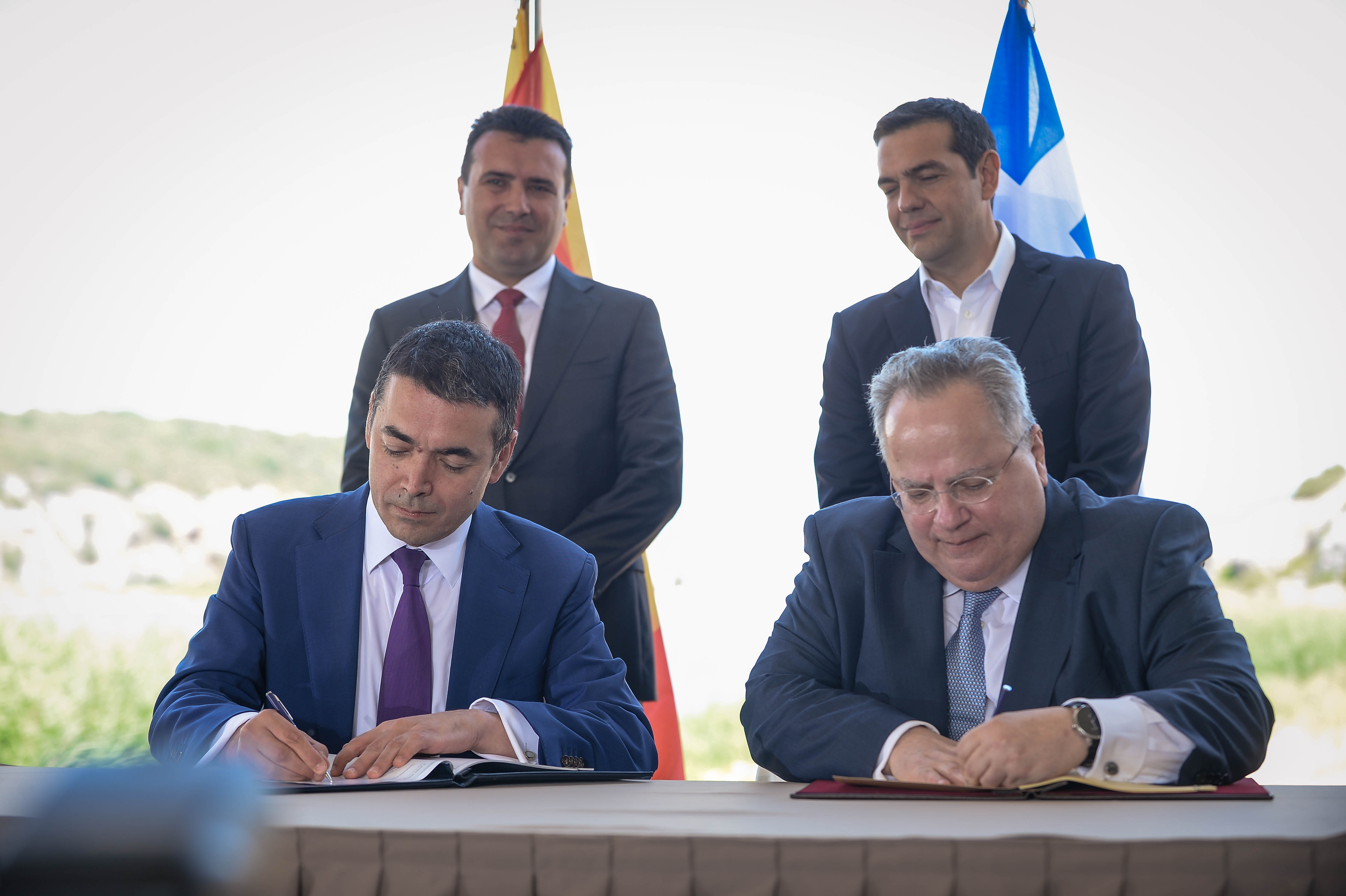
Zaev stands with Greek PM Alexis Tsipras as the foreign ministers of both countries sign the Prespa Agreement

On 12 June 2018, Greek prime minister Alexis Tsipras announced that an agreement had been reached with his Macedonian counterpart Zoran Zaev on the dispute, "which covers all the preconditions set by the Greek side". The proposal would result in the (former) Republic of Macedonia being renamed the Republic of North Macedonia (Macedonian: Република Северна Македонија, romanized: Republika Severna Makedonija; Greek: Δημοκρατία της Βόρειας Μακεδονίας), with the new name being used for all purposes. Zaev announced that the deal includes recognition of Macedonian in the United Nations and that the citizens of the country will be called, as before, Macedonians. However, there is an explicit clarification that the citizens of the country are not related to any Hellenic civilization previously inhabiting the region.

On 5 July, the Prespa agreement was ratified again by the parliament of Macedonia with 69 MPs voting in favor of it. On 11 July, NATO invited Macedonia to start accession talks in a bid to become the EuroAtlantic alliance's 30th member. On 30 July, the parliament of Macedonia approved plans to hold a non-binding referendum on changing the country's name that took place on 30 September. The decisive vote to amend the constitution and change the name of the country passed on 11 January 2019 in favor of the amendment. The amendment entered into force following the ratification of the Prespa agreement and the Protocol of Accession of North Macedonia to NATO by the Greek Parliament.

==== Relations to Albania and Albanians of North Macedonia ====
Zoran Zaev has a relative good relationship with Albania and the Albanians of North Macedonia. During the 2016 Macedonian parliamentary election, he supported the Albanian parties and the Tirana-Platform, which was an agreement between SDSM, DUI and BESA made in Tirana, Albania. Zaev managed to win the elections in North Macedonia however the President Gjorge Ivanov did not accept him as a new prime minister. Ivanov said he refused to give a mandate to form the country's new government to SDSM leader Zoran Zaev - who reached a coalition agreement with ethnic Albanian parties. He refuses to give such a mandate "to anyone who negotiates platforms of foreign countries that blackmail the Macedonian people, jeopardizes the integrity of the state, its sovereignty and independence." This led to the Macedonian political crisis (2015–2017) and the storming of Macedonian Parliament in which a lot of Macedonians and the ruling party VMRO-DPMNE feared of more Albanian influence in North Macedonia.

The VMRO-DPMNE described Zaev and SDSM as traitors who are paid from Albania and foreign countries, who want to introduce Albanian as a second official language throughout the country and who want to federalize North Macedonia.

During an interview with Top Channel, Zoran Zaev describes Albania as the friendliest country for North Macedonia and that it is a 100% friendship, mutual support for progress, a common future and a better future for citizens. Zaev pointed out that trade between Tirana and Skopje increased by 11.5 percent last year and that both countries have considerable capacity to do other tasks.

==== Mini Schengen Zone ====
On 10 October 2019, together with Aleksandar Vučić, President of Serbia, and Edi Rama, Prime Minister of Albania, Zaev signed the so-called Mini Schengen deal on regional economic cooperation, including on the free movement of goods, capital, services, and labour between their three countries, while they await progress on EU enlargement. A month later, the leaders presented a set of proposals to achieve the "four freedoms" and the first steps towards them, including the possibility to the open border area. In December, the three leaders also met with Milo Đukanović, President of Montenegro, opening the possibility for the country to join the zone.

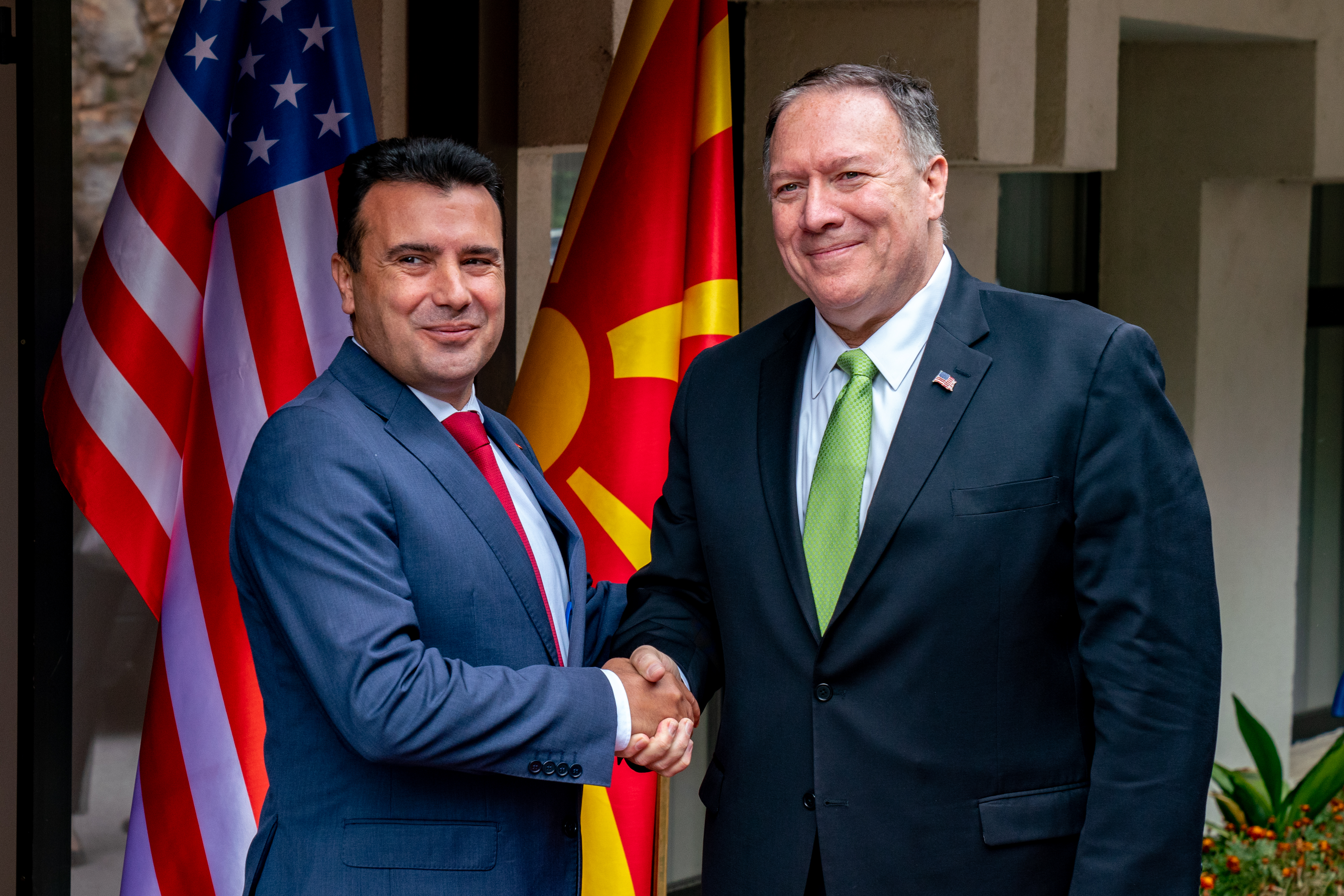
Zaev meets with U.S. Secretary of State Michael R. Pompeo meets in Lake Ohrid, North Macedonia on October 4, 2019.

=== Second premiership (2020–2022) ===
After the 2020 parliamentary election, the SDSM-led "We Can" coalition won the most seats but did not reach a majority. On 18 August, the SDSM and DUI announced that they had reached a deal on a coalition government as well as a compromise on the issue of an ethnic Albanian prime minister. Under the deal, SDSM leader Zoran Zaev will be installed as prime minister, and will serve in that position until no later than 100 days from the next parliamentary elections (rotation government). At that time, the DUI will propose an ethnic Albanian candidate for prime minister, and if both parties agree on the candidate, that candidate will serve out the remaining term until the elections. On 30 August, a coalition of the SDSM-aligned parties, DUI, and the Democratic Party of Albanians was approved by the parliament.

On 31 October 2021, shortly after Skopje local election results were revealed, Zaev announced that he will be stepping down as the prime minister of North Macedonia and as president of SDSM.

On 23 December 2021, the Assembly of North Macedonia approved Prime Minister Zoran Zaev's resignation, forcing the entire government to dissolve and a new government to be elected in three weeks. Dimitar Kovačevski was "elected to form a mandate to form a government" on 27 December 2021, to likely become the new prime minister. Kovačevski was inaugurated on 16 January 2022.

Political offices
Preceded by Branko Crvenkovski	Leader of the Opposition; 2013–2017	Succeeded by Nikola Gruevski
Preceded by Emil Dimitriev	Prime Minister of North Macedonia; 2017–2020	Succeeded by Oliver Spasovski
Preceded by Oliver Spasovski	Prime Minister of North Macedonia; 2020–2022	Succeeded by Dimitar Kovačevski
