= Prime Minister of North Macedonia =

Head of government

President of the Government of the Republic of North Macedonia
- Претседател на Владата на Република Северна Македонија (Macedonian); Kryetari i Qeverisë së Republikës së Maqedonisë së Veriut (Albanian)
- Coat of arms of North Macedonia

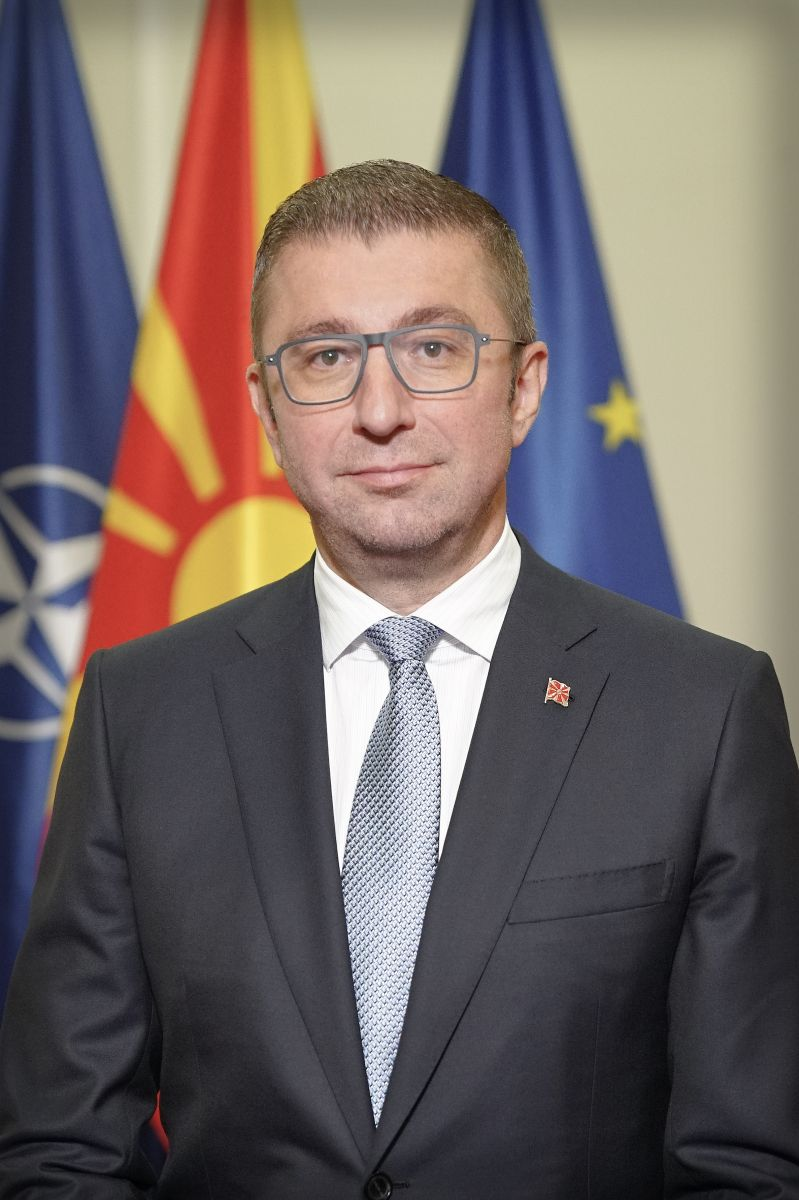
- Incumbent; Hristijan Mickoski since 23 June 2024
- Appointer: Assembly of North Macedonia
- Inaugural holder: Nikola Kljusev
- Formation: 20 March 1991; 35 years ago Constitution of North Macedonia
- Salary: 1,580 USD (87,813 denars monthly)
- Website: Governmental web page

The prime minister of North Macedonia (Macedonian: Премиер на Северна Македонија, romanized: Premier na Severna Makedonija, Albanian: Kryeministri i Maqedonisë së Veriut), officially the President of the Government of the Republic of North Macedonia (Macedonian: Претседател на Владата на Република Северна Македонија, romanized: Pretsedatel na Vladata na Republika Severna Makedonija, Albanian: Kryetari i Qeverisë së Republikës së Maqedonisë së Veriut), is the head of government of North Macedonia.

The prime minister is the head of the cabinet and is usually the leader of a political coalition in parliament.

The current prime minister is Hristijan Mickoski, who has been in office since 23 June 2024.

== History ==
As per the Pržino Agreement, the incumbent prime minister resigns in favour of a technical one (one with more limited powers than the prime minister chosen from the start of the mandate), 100 days before the new parliamentary elections. Emil Dimitriev, Oliver Spasovski and Talat Xhaferi were technical prime ministers.

== List of prime ministers ==
=== Socialist Republic of Macedonia ===
Party

KPM/SKM

No.	Portrait	Name (Birth–Death)	Term of office		Political party
Minister for Macedonia; 1945
1		Emanuel Čučkov (1901–1967)	7 March 1945	1945	KPM
Prime Minister; 1945–1953
2		Lazar Koliševski (1914–2000)	16 April 1945	1953	KPM renamed in 1952 to SKM
2	President of the Executive Council; 1953–1991				
2		Lazar Koliševski (1914–2000)	1953	December 1953	SKM
3		Ljupčo Arsov (1910–1986)	December 1953	1961	SKM
4		Aleksandar Grličkov (1923–1989)	1961	1965	SKM
5		Nikola Minčev (1915–1997)	1965	1968	SKM
6		Ksente Bogoev (1919–2008)	1968	March 1974	SKM
7		Blagoj Popov (1920–1992)	March 1974	29 April 1982	SKM
8		Dragoljub Stavrev (1932–2003)	29 April 1982	June 1986	SKM
9		Gligorije Gogovski (1943–2022)	June 1986	27 January 1991	SKM

=== Republic of Macedonia / North Macedonia ===
Parties

SDSM VMRO–DPMNE DUI

Independent

Status

No.	Portrait	Name (Birth–Death)	Term of office			Political party	Election
No.	Portrait	Name (Birth–Death)	Took office	Left office	Time in office	Political party	Election
1	Nikola Kljusev	Nikola Kljusev (1927–2008)	20 March 1991	4 September 1992	1 year, 168 days	Independent	1990
2	Branko Crvenkovski	Branko Crvenkovski (born 1962)	4 September 1992	30 November 1998	6 years, 87 days	SDSM	1994
3	Ljubčo Georgievski	Ljubčo Georgievski (born 1966)	30 November 1998	1 November 2002	3 years, 336 days	VMRO-DPMNE	1998
(2)	Branko Crvenkovski	Branko Crvenkovski (born 1962)	1 November 2002	12 May 2004	1 year, 193 days	SDSM	2002
4	Radmila Šekerinska	Radmila Šekerinska (born 1972); Acting	12 May 2004	2 June 2004	21 days	SDSM	—
5	Hari Kostov	Hari Kostov (born 1959)	2 June 2004	18 November 2004	169 days	Independent	—
(4)	Radmila Šekerinska	Radmila Šekerinska (born 1972); Acting	18 November 2004	12 December 2004	24 days	SDSM	—
6	Vlado Bučkovski	Vlado Bučkovski (born 1962)	12 December 2004	26 August 2006	1 year, 257 days	SDSM	—
7	Nikola Gruevski	Nikola Gruevski (born 1970)	26 August 2006	18 January 2016	9 years, 145 days	VMRO-DPMNE	2006; 2008; 2011; 2014
8	Emil Dimitriev	Emil Dimitriev (born 1979)	18 January 2016	31 May 2017	1 year, 133 days	VMRO-DPMNE	—
9	Zoran Zaev	Zoran Zaev (born 1974)	31 May 2017	3 January 2020	2 years, 217 days	SDSM	2016
10	Oliver Spasovski	Oliver Spasovski (born 1976)	3 January 2020	30 August 2020	240 days	SDSM	—
(9)	Zoran Zaev	Zoran Zaev (born 1974)	30 August 2020	16 January 2022	1 year, 139 days	SDSM	2020
11	Dimitar Kovačevski	Dimitar Kovačevski (born 1974)	16 January 2022	28 January 2024	2 years, 12 days	SDSM	—
12	Talat Xhaferi	Talat Xhaferi (born 1962)	28 January 2024	23 June 2024	147 days	BDI	—
13	Hristijan Mickoski	Hristijan Mickoski (born 1977)	23 June 2024	Incumbent	2 years, 140 days	VMRO-DPMNE	2024

== See also ==
- President of North Macedonia
- List of presidents of the Assembly of the Republic of North Macedonia
- Politics of North Macedonia
