= List of members of the Assembly of North Macedonia, 2020–2024 =

This is a list of the 123 members of the Assembly of North Macedonia from 2020 to 2024, as elected in the 2020 election.

List of Members of the Assembly of North Macedonia
Member	Political Party
Abdula Saliu	Alliance for Albanians
Afrim Gashi	Alternativa
Aleksandar Nikoloski	VMRO-DPMNE
Aleksandar Veljanovski	VMRO-DPMNE
Ali Ahmeti	Democratic Union for Integration
Ane Lashkoska	VMRO-DPMNE
Angelinka Petkova	VMRO-DPMNE
Antonio Milošoski	VMRO-DPMNE
Arbana Pasholi	Democratic Union for Integration
Arben Ziberi	Democratic Union for Integration
Amber Ademi	Democratic Union for Integration
Arta Biljali-Zendeli	Democratic Union for Integration
Artina Qazimi	Alliance for Albanians
Atnan Neziri	Alliance for Albanians
Bajram Kadrija	Democratic Union for Integration
Bastri Bajrami	Independent
Bedri Fazli	Democratic Union for Integration
Bejdzan Iljas	Democratic Party of Turks
Belkisa Zekiri	Social Democratic Union of Macedonia
Berat Ajdari	Democratic Union for Integration
Beti Rabadzievska-Naumovska	Social Democratic Union of Macedonia
Beti Stamenkoska-Trajkoska	VMRO-DPMNE
Blagica Lasovska	VMRO-DPMNE
Bobi Mojsoski	Liberal Democratic Party
Bojan Stojanoski	VMRO-DPMNE
Borislav Krmov	Levica
Brane Petrushevski	VMRO-DPMNE
Dafina Stojanoska	VMRO-DPMNE
Dajancho Eftimov	VMRO-DPMNE
Daniela Hristova	VMRO-DPMNE
Daniela Koleva	Social Democratic Union of Macedonia
Daniela Markoska	Social Democratic Union of Macedonia
Daniela Nikolova	Social Democratic Union of Macedonia
Daniela Stojanovska - Bogataska	Social Democratic Union of Macedonia
Darko Kaevski	Social Democratic Union of Macedonia
Dime Velkovski	Social Democratic Union of Macedonia
Dimitar Apasiev	Levica
Dragan Kovachki	VMRO-DPMNE
Dragica Gavochanova	Social Democratic Union of Macedonia
Dragoljub Filiposki	Social Democratic Union of Macedonia
Eli Panova	VMRO-DPMNE
Elmi Aziri	Alliance for Albanians
Emilija Rambabova	Social Democratic Union of Macedonia
Enes Ibrahim	Party for the Movement of Turks in Macedonia
Fadil Zendeli	Besa Movement
Fanica Nikoloska	Social Democratic Union of Macedonia
Fisnike Bekteshi-Shaqiri	Democratic Union for Integration
Gjorgija Sajkoski	VMRO-DPMNE
Goran Misovski	New Social Democratic Party
Gordana Siljanovska-Davkova	Independent
Gracija Bakracheska	VMRO-DPMNE
Halil Snopche	Alliance for Albanians
Husni Ismaili	Alternativa
Igor Janusev	VMRO-DPMNE
Igor Zdravkovski	VMRO-DPMNE
Ilija Nikolovski	Party of Pensioners
Ilire Dauti	Alliance for Albanians
Ismail Jahoski	Democratic Union for Integration
Ivan Stoilković	Democratic Party of Serbs in Macedonia
Ivanka Vasilevska	VMRO-DPMNE
Izet Medziti	Democratic Movement
Jadranka Pockova	VMRO-DPMNE
Jovan Jauleski	VMRO-DPMNE
Jovan Mitreski	Social Democratic Union of Macedonia
Kastriot Redzepi	Democratic Movement
Kole Charakchiev	Social Democratic Union of Macedonia
Laze Tanevski	Social Democratic Union of Macedonia
Lidija Petkoska	VMRO-DPMNE
Lidija Tasevska	Social Democratic Union of Macedonia
Ljatife Shikovska	Social Democratic Union of Macedonia
Ljubica Spasova	Social Democratic Union of Macedonia
Ljupcho Balkoski	VMRO – People's Party
Ljupcho Dimovska	Socialist Party of Macedonia
Ljupcho Prendzov	Citizen Option for Macedonia
Lolita Ristova	Social Democratic Union of Macedonia
Maja Morachanin	Democratic Renewal of Macedonia
Marija Angelova	Social Democratic Union of Macedonia
Marija Georgievska	Social Democratic Union of Macedonia
Marija Kochovska	Social Democratic Union of Macedonia
Marija Kostadinova	Social Democratic Union of Macedonia
Marija Petrushevska	VMRO-DPMNE
Martin Kostovski	Social Democratic Union of Macedonia
Menduh Tachi	Democratic Party of Albanians
Merita Kolchi-Kodzadziku	Democratic Movement
Mile Lefkov	VMRO-DPMNE
Мile Talevski	Social Democratic Union of Macedonia
Mirche Adzioski	VMRO-DPMNE
Miroslav Jovanoviq	Serbian Progressive Party in Macedonia
Monika Zajkova	Liberal Democratic Party
Muhamet Kadriov	Social Democratic Union of Macedonia
Nenad Kociq	Social Democratic Union of Macedonia
Nikola Micevski	VMRO-DPMNE
Olga Lozanovska	VMRO-DPMNE
Pancho Minov	Social Democratic Union of Macedonia
Pavle Trajanov	Democratic Union
Petar Risteski	VMRO-DPMNE
Ramzi Mehmedi	Alliance for Albanians
Rashela Mizrahi	VMRO-DPMNE
Rina Ajdari	Democratic Union for Integration
Safije Sadiki Shaini	Alternativa
Sanela Shkrijel	Independent
Silvana Angelevska	VMRO-DPMNE
Sinisha Stojanoski	VMRO-DPMNE
Skender Redzepi	Independent politician
Snezana Kaleska-Vancheva	Social Democratic Union of Macedonia
Sonja Mihailovska	Social Democratic Union of Macedonia
Sonja Mirakovska	New Social Democratic Party
Stojan Milanov	Socialist Party of Macedonia
Talat Xhaferi	Democratic Union for Integration
Toni Jarevski	VMRO-DPMNE
Velika Stojkova-Serafimovska	VMRO-DPMNE
Vjolca Ademi	Democratic Union for Integration
Vlado Misajlovski	VMRO-DPMNE
Zaklina Lazarevska	Social Democratic Union of Macedonia
Zaklina Peshevska	VMRO-DPMNE
Zdravko Trajanov	VMRO-DPMNE
Ziadin Sela	Alliance for Albanians
Zlatko Penkov	VMRO-DPMNE
Zoran Kocevski	VMRO-DPMNE
Zorancho Jovanchev	VMRO-DPMNE
