= List of directors of the Intelligence Agency of the Republic of North Macedonia =

This is a list of Directors of the Intelligence Agency (IA) of North Macedonia.

#	Name (Born–Died)	Portrait	Appointed	Term of office		Speakers of the Assembly in Office
Director; 1991 onwards
1	(North Macedonia) Vlado Popovski (1941-)		1991	1991		Stojan Andov
2	(North Macedonia) Aleksa Stamenkovski (1952-)					Stojan Andov; Tito Petkovski; Savo Klimovski
3	(North Macedonia) Dragi Grozdanovski (1957-)		2000	2000	2002	Stojan Andov
4	(North Macedonia) Dosta Dimovska (1954-2011)		2002	2002	2003	Nikola Popovski
5	(North Macedonia) Dragi Grozdanovski second term (1957-)		2003	2003	2004	Ljupčo Jordanovski
6	(North Macedonia) Lazar Kitanoski (1948-)		2004	2004	2006	Ljupčo Jordanovski
7	(North Macedonia) Kire Naumov (1971-)		2006	2006	2007	Ljubiša Georgievski
8	(North Macedonia) Viktor Dimovski (1959-)		2007	2007	2009	Ljubiša Georgievski; Trajko Veljanovski
9	(North Macedonia) Aleksandar Bocinov (????-)		2009	2009	2013	Trajko Veljanovski
10	(North Macedonia) Nakje Chulev (1972-)		2013	2013	incumbent	Trajko Veljanovski
