= 2025 North Macedonian local elections =

- 19 October and 2 November 2025 & 11 January 2026

80 municipalities and City of Skopje
- Registered: 1,832,415 (First round); 1,013,357 (Second round)
- Turnout: 46.48% (First round); 40.46% (Second round)
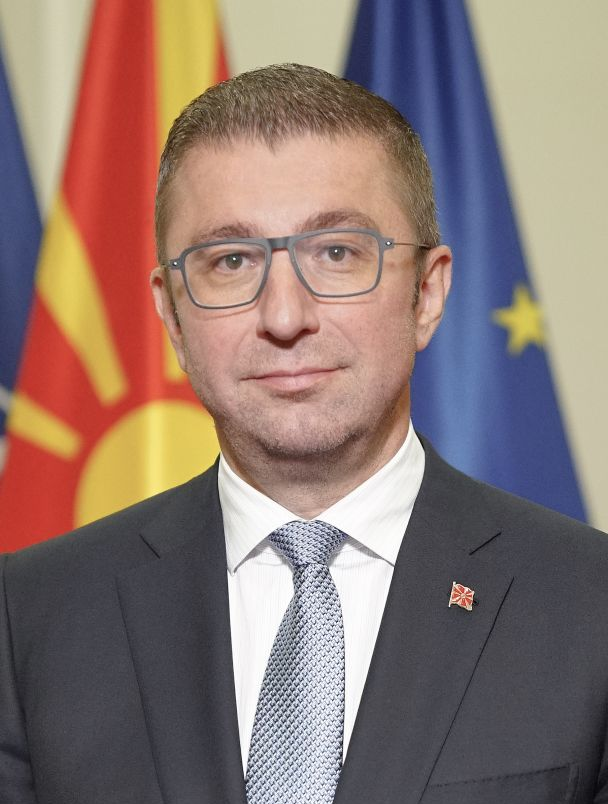

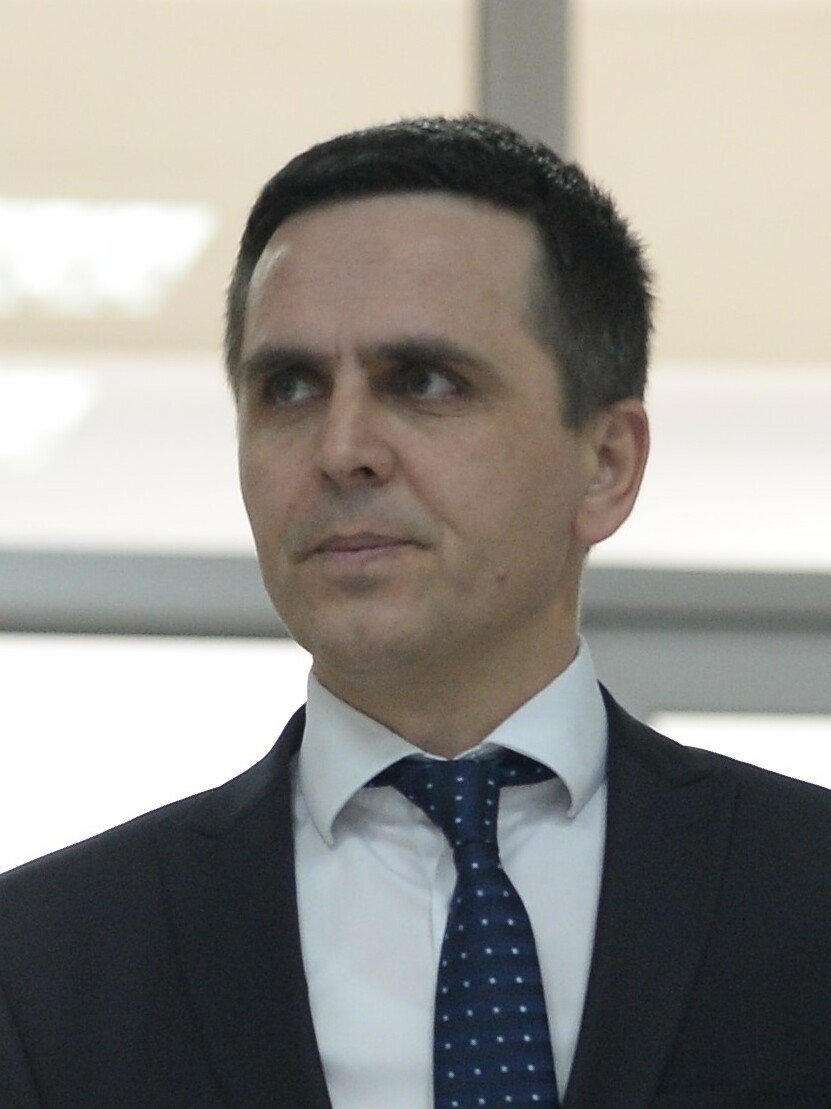

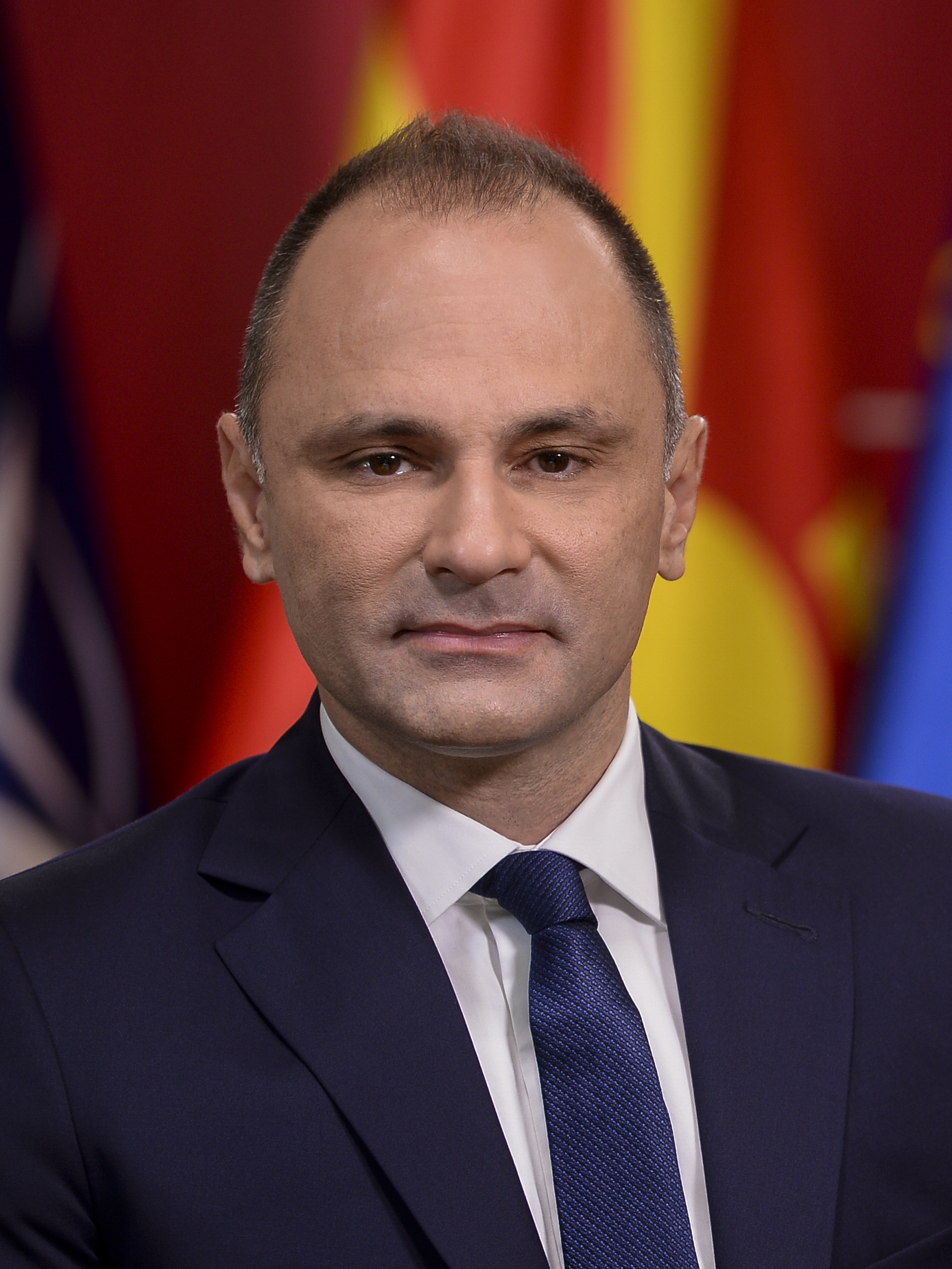

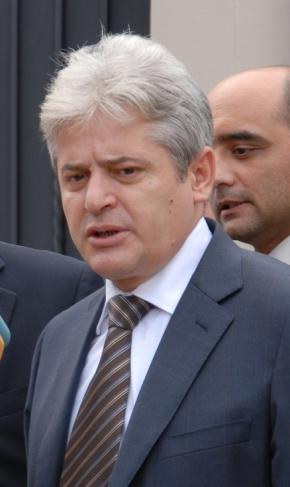

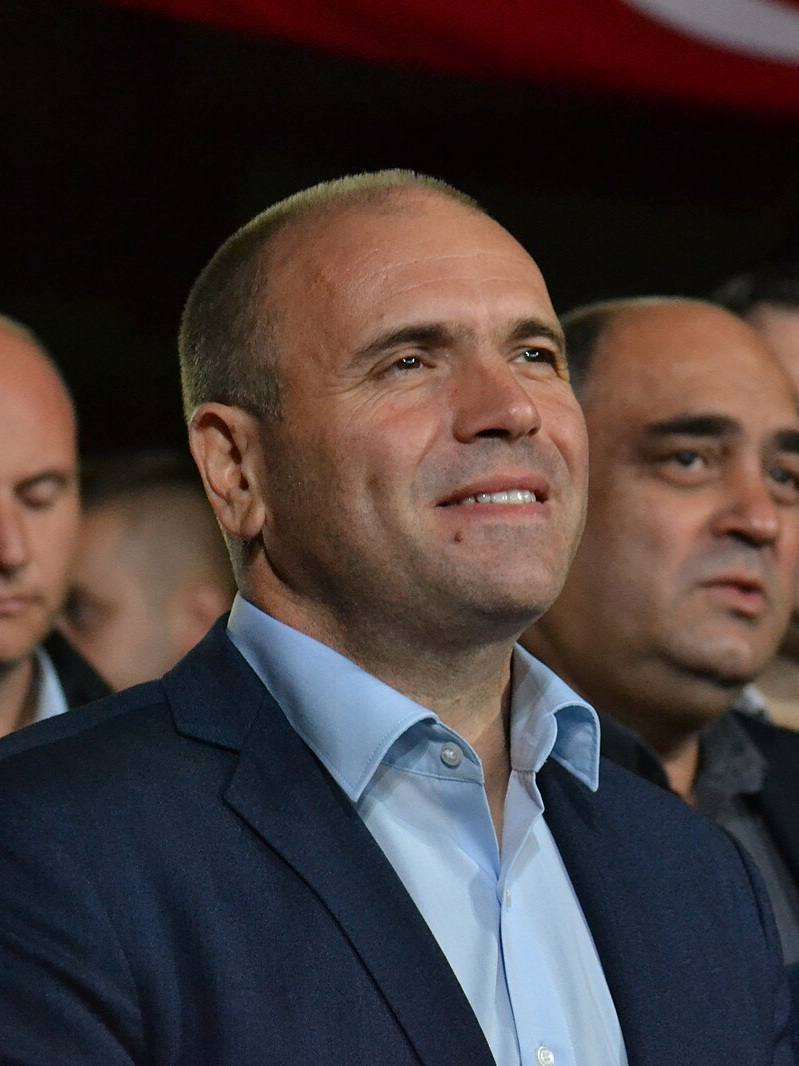
	First party	Second party	Third party
Leader	Hristijan Mickoski	Bilall Kasami	Venko Filipče
Party	VMRO-DPMNE	VLEN	SDSM
Mayoralities won	55	9	6
Change	▲13	▲7	▼10
	Fourth party	Fifth party	Sixth party
Leader	Ali Ahmeti	Maksim Dimitrievski	Kurto Dudush
Party	National Alliance for Integration (Note: Democratic Union for Integration (BDI), Alliance for Albanians (ASH), People's Movement (North Macedonia) (LP))	ZNAM	Union of Roma
Mayoralities won	6	1	1
Change	▼8	Steady	▲1
	Seventh party	Eighth party
Leader	–	Beycan İlyas
Party	Independent (Note: An Independent candidate Mendi Qyra in Struga Municipality)	Democratic Party of Turks of Macedonia
Mayoralities won	1	1
Change	▲1	Steady

Local elections were held in North Macedonia on 19 October 2025, with a second round on 2 November 2025. The elections were to elect councilors and mayors in 80 municipalities and the City of Skopje and were announced on 9 August 2025 by the Speaker of the Assembly Afrim Gashi. According to the State Election Commission's calendar, the deadline for submitting candidacies for councilor and mayor lists was 13 September 2025. National issues were dominant in the debates during the elections. The elections had the lowest turnout since the country's independence.

== Background ==
On 9 August 2025, Assembly Speaker Afrim Gashi announced the elections. 1,832,415 voters were eligible to vote, including 112,000 temporarily working voters or voters residing abroad, 2,162 voters in custody or serving prison sentences, and 450 voters residing in nursing homes.

The campaign for the first round lasted from 29 September to 17 October. The election campaign was dominated by national questions, such as issues of identity, minority rights, and the stalled EU accession process. Venko Filipče, leader of the Social Democratic Union of Macedonia (SDSM), proposed a resolution to define national positions on the country's EU path and tried to persuade the government to comply with obligations under the framework for EU membership negotiations by 10 February 2026. He also said he would vote to include the Bulgarians into the constitution of North Macedonia, alongside other ethnic groups. Prime Minister Hristijan Mickoski, leader of VMRO-DPMNE, rejected the proposal, arguing it fails to protect national interests. In rallies, he accused the opposition of accepting Bulgaria's demands.

Despite the 40% gender quota for candidate lists, the mayoral candidates were overwhelmingly men (277 candidates, 89,6%), while women were 32 (10,4%) candidates out of a total of 309 mayoral candidates. International observers expressed concerns about sexist rhetoric against female candidates and women's political participation in general, especially online.

The Balkan Investigative Reporting Network moderated seven TV debates, in which mayoral candidates from Albanian-majority municipalities stated their plans for the next four years. Local issues, such as urban planning, infrastructure, education, water supply, transparency and gender equality were part of the debates.

== Results ==
The ruling VMRO-DPMNE won the most mayoral spots, 33, in the first round. Meanwhile, VLEN won 5 municipalities, SDSM won 3, and NAI won 3.

The State Election Commission confirmed on 20 October that 4 municipalities failed to reach the required 1/3 minimum turnout, and the first round will have to be repeated no longer than 60 days after the publishing of the official results.

In total, VMRO-DPMNE achieved 54 mayors (12 more than in the previous elections), including in the City of Skopje, while SDSM gained only six mayors (unlike the 16 mayoral seats it received in the previous elections). North Macedonia has 80 municipalities, of which 37 were part of the second round. Turnout was 41,47%, lower than the 46,48% turnout from the first round. VLEN managed to achieve mayors in 9 municipalities, while NAI only won in 4 municipalities, a decline from the 11 mayoral seats it won in the previous elections. Levica failed to gain any mayoral seats. 4 women were elected as mayors. As the turnout did not exceed 50% in either round, the elections had the lowest turnout since the country's independence.

Region	Municipality	Elected	Percentage	Party
Eastern Statistical Region	Berovo	Petar Ruzhinski	57.54%	VMRO-DPMNE
Eastern Statistical Region	Češinovo-Obleševo	Jordanče Kostadinov	48.64%	VMRO-DPMNE
Eastern Statistical Region	Delčevo	Ivan Gocevski	67.82%	VMRO-DPMNE
Eastern Statistical Region	Karbinci	Viktor Paunov	68.29%	VMRO-DPMNE
Eastern Statistical Region	Kočani	Vlatko Grozdanov	52.71%	VMRO-DPMNE
Eastern Statistical Region	Makedonska Kamenica	Sonja Stamenkova	46.18%	SDSM
Eastern Statistical Region	Pehčevo	Alexander Kitanski	52.47%	VMRO-DPMNE
Eastern Statistical Region	Probištip	Toni Tonevski	47.31%	VMRO-DPMNE
Eastern Statistical Region	Štip	Ivan Jordanov	76.74%	VMRO-DPMNE
Eastern Statistical Region	Vinica	Mitko Kostadinovski	54.18%	VMRO-DPMNE
Eastern Statistical Region	Zrnovci	Vanĉo Mitev	48.49%	SDSM
Northeastern Statistical Region	Kratovo	Todorče Nikolovski	73.20%	VMRO-DPMNE
Northeastern Statistical Region	Kriva Palanka	Saško Mitovski	50.96%	SDSM
Northeastern Statistical Region	Kumanovo	Maksim Dimitrievski	50.01%	ZNAM
Northeastern Statistical Region	Lipkovo	Erkan Arifi	61.71%	NAI
Northeastern Statistical Region	Rankovce	Daniel Pavlovski	52.23%	VMRO-DPMNE
Northeastern Statistical Region	Staro Nagoričane	Miroslav Slavkovski	50.05%	VMRO-DPMNE
Pelagonia Statistical Region	Bitola	Toni Konjanovski	50.52%	VMRO-DPMNE
Pelagonia Statistical Region	Demir Hisar	Nikola Najdovski	53.91%	VMRO-DPMNE
Pelagonia Statistical Region	Dolneni	Blerim Isljami	57.37%	VLEN
Pelagonia Statistical Region	Krivogaštani	Igor Karaviloski	50.67%	SDSM
Pelagonia Statistical Region	Kruševo	Niko Čoneski	48.59%	VMRO-DPMNE
Pelagonia Statistical Region	Mogila	Dragančo Sabotkovski	79.86%	VMRO-DPMNE
Pelagonia Statistical Region	Novaci	Stevče Stevanovski	53.65%	VMRO-DPMNE
Pelagonia Statistical Region	Prilep	Dejan Prodanoski	55.97%	VMRO-DPMNE
Pelagonia Statistical Region	Resen	Jovan Tozievski	56.25%	VMRO-DPMNE
Polog Statistical Region	Bogovinje	Feti Abazi	54.89%	VLEN
Polog Statistical Region	Brvenica	Jovica Ilievski	49.83%	VMRO-DPMNE
Polog Statistical Region	Gostivar	Valbon Limani	64.48%	NAI
Polog Statistical Region	Jegunovce	Dimitar Kostadinoski	58.32%	VMRO-DPMNE
Polog Statistical Region	Mavrovo and Rostuša	Oner Jakupovski	65.61%	VMRO-DPMNE
Polog Statistical Region	Tearce	Daut Memishi	54.60%	VLEN
Polog Statistical Region	Tetovo	Bilall Kasami	53.62%	VLEN
Polog Statistical Region	Vrapčište	Isen Shabani	61.59%	NAI
Polog Statistical Region	Želino	Blerim Sejdiu	54.20%	VLEN
Skopje Statistical Region	Skopje	Orce Ǵorǵievski	57.03%	VMRO-DPMNE
Skopje Statistical Region	Aerodrom	Dejan Miteski	58.36%	VMRO-DPMNE
Skopje Statistical Region	Aračinovo	Daut Beqiri	51.25%	VLEN
Skopje Statistical Region	Butel	Darko Kostovski	52.96%	VMRO-DPMNE
Skopje Statistical Region	Čair	Izet Mexhiti	51.82%	VLEN
Skopje Statistical Region	Centar	Goran Gerasimovski	52.92%	SDSM
Skopje Statistical Region	Čučer-Sandevo	Zoran Bajovski	53.78%	SDSM
Skopje Statistical Region	Gazi Baba	Boban Stefkovski	58.42%	VMRO-DPMNE
Skopje Statistical Region	Gjorče Petrov	Aleksandar Stojkoski	55.73%	VMRO-DPMNE
Skopje Statistical Region	Ilinden	Aleksandar Georgievski	79.73%	VMRO-DPMNE
Skopje Statistical Region	Karpoš	Sotir Lukrovski	47.04%	VMRO-DPMNE
Skopje Statistical Region	Kisela Voda	Beti Stamenoska - Trajkoska	57.36%	VMRO-DPMNE
Skopje Statistical Region	Petrovec	Borče Mitevski	77.43%	VMRO-DPMNE
Skopje Statistical Region	Saraj	Muhamet Elmazi	50.28%	VLEN
Skopje Statistical Region	Sopište	Jane Micevski	80.20%	VMRO-DPMNE
Skopje Statistical Region	Studeničani	Ejup Abazi	49.88%	NAI
Skopje Statistical Region	Šuto Orizari	Kurto Duduš	50.89%	Union of Roma
Skopje Statistical Region	Zelenikovo	Kosta Manevski	57.19%	VMRO-DPMNE
Southeastern Statistical Region	Bogdanci	Blaže Šapov	50.03%	SDSM
Southeastern Statistical Region	Bosilovo	Risto Manchev	70.12%	VMRO-DPMNE
Southeastern Statistical Region	Gevgelija	Andon Saramandov	56.05%	VMRO-DPMNE
Southeastern Statistical Region	Dojran	Ilija Tentov	60.76%	VMRO-DPMNE
Southeastern Statistical Region	Konče	Zlatko Ristov	53.36%	VMRO-DPMNE
Southeastern Statistical Region	Novo Selo	Ǵorǵe Božinov	58.86%	VMRO-DPMNE
Southeastern Statistical Region	Radoviš	Ljupche Pochivalec	55.77%	VMRO-DPMNE
Southeastern Statistical Region	Strumica	Petar Jankov	55.98%	VMRO-DPMNE
Southeastern Statistical Region	Valandovo	Ǵoko Kamčev	49.66%	VMRO-DPMNE
Southeastern Statistical Region	Vasilevo	Slave Andonov	73.97%	VMRO-DPMNE
Southwestern Statistical Region	Centar Župa	Arijan Ibraim	97.01%	DPTM
Southwestern Statistical Region	Debar	Fisnik Mela	52.47%	VLEN
Southwestern Statistical Region	Debarca	Zlatko Siljanoski	61.65%	VMRO-DPMNE
Southwestern Statistical Region	Kičevo	Aleksandar Jovanovski	52.09%	VMRO-DPMNE
Southwestern Statistical Region	Makedonski Brod	Žarko Risteski	80.13%	VMRO-DPMNE
Southwestern Statistical Region	Ohrid	Kiril Pecakov	63.91%	VMRO-DPMNE
Southwestern Statistical Region	Plasnica	Alija Jaoski	64.45%	NAI
Southwestern Statistical Region	Struga	Mendi Qyra	48.67%	Independent
Southwestern Statistical Region	Vevčani	Spase Kočovski	55.83%	VMRO-DPMNE
Vardar Statistical Region	Čaška	Suat Shaqiri	50.71%	NAI
Vardar Statistical Region	Demir Kapija	Natalija Dimitrieva	49.96%	VMRO-DPMNE
Vardar Statistical Region	Gradsko	Kiro Nackov	71.92%	VMRO-DPMNE
Vardar Statistical Region	Kavadarci	Mitko Janchev	73.89%	VMRO-DPMNE
Vardar Statistical Region	Negotino	Marija Naceva	51.44%	VMRO-DPMNE
Vardar Statistical Region	Rosoman	Ǵorǵi Krstevski	49.68%	VMRO-DPMNE
Vardar Statistical Region	Sveti Nikole	Dejan Vladev	59.06%	VMRO-DPMNE
Vardar Statistical Region	Lozovo	Boško Cvetkovski	49.56%	VMRO-DPMNE
Vardar Statistical Region	Veles	Marko Kolev	73.34%	VMRO-DPMNE

== Council results ==
Party	Seats
VMRO-DPMNE	549
Social Democratic Union of Macedonia	231
National Alliance for Integration	206
VLEN Coalition	131
Independents and Others	93
The Left	66
For Our Macedonia	44
Democratic Party of Turks	21
Union of Roma	4

== Aftermath ==
After the negative result of the first round of the election, Filipče publicly stated his disappointment, but was hopeful for a "more positive", second round comeback.

After the first round, OSCE stated: "The campaign was competitive in North Macedonia's local elections and voters had a wide range of political alternatives to choose from, but they were negatively affected by systemic legal gaps and shortcomings in the oversight of campaign finances as well as political polarization and deep public disenchantment with politics."

Regarding the second round, OSCE stated:

The second round of North Macedonia's mayoral elections offered voters a choice between political alternatives and the campaign was competitive in most municipalities, but not all candidates had equal campaign conditions and the continued involvement of government officials in the campaign continued as well as persistent allegations of pressure on voters and numerous allegations of vote buying were of concern.

After SDSM's heavy defeat in the elections, a vice-president of the party resigned and Filipče announced changes to the party.
