= List of presidents of the Assembly of North Macedonia =

This article lists the presidents of the Assembly of North Macedonia and its predecessors, ASNOM and the Socialist Republic of Macedonia.

== List of presidents (1944–present) ==
=== Presidents of the People's Assembly of the Socialist Republic of Macedonia (1944–1991) ===
Party

KPM/SKM

Status

Acting President

No.	Name (Birth–Death)	Portrait	Term of office		Political party
1	Metodija Andonov-Čento (1902–1957) (Note: Andonov was President of the Presidium of ASNOM.)		2 August 1944	15 March 1946	Communist Partry of Macedonia
2	Boris Spirov (1898–1974)		30 December 1946	30 December 1947	Communist Partry of Macedonia
3	Dimitar Nestorov (1890–1968)		30 December 1947	3 January 1951	Communist Party of Macedonia
4	Dimče Stojanov (1910–1991)		4 January 1951	19 November 1953	Communist Party of Macedonia renamed in 1952 to League of Communists of Macedonia
5	Lazar Koliševski (1914–2000)		19 November 1953	26 June 1962	League of Communists of Macedonia
6	Ljupčo Arsov (1910–1986)		26 June 1962	24 June 1963	League of Communists of Macedonia
7	Vidoe Smilevski (1915–1979)		25 June 1963	12 May 1967	League of Communists of Macedonia
8	Mito Hadživasilev (1921–1968)		1967	1 August 1968	League of Communists of Macedonia
9	Nikola Minčev (1915–1997)		23 September 1968	6 May 1974	League of Communists of Macedonia
10	Blagoja Taleski (1924–2001)		May 1974	1982	League of Communists of Macedonia
11	Boško Stankovski (1925–1987)		28 April 1982	28 April 1984	League of Communists of Macedonia
12	Kata Lahtova (1924–1995)		28 April 1984	25 April 1985	League of Communists of Macedonia
13	Stanko Mladenovski (born 1937)		25 April 1985	28 April 1986	League of Communists of Macedonia
14	Vulnet Starova (1934–1995)		28 April 1986	8 January 1991	League of Communists of Macedonia

=== Presidents of the Assembly of the Republic of Macedonia / North Macedonia (from 1991) ===
Parties

LPM SDSM DA LDP VMRO-DPMNE BDI Alternative

Status

Acting President

No.	Name (Birth–Death)	Portrait	Term of office		Political party
1	Stojan Andov (1935–2024)		8 January 1991	6 March 1996	Liberal Party of Macedonia
2	Tito Petkovski (born 1945)		6 March 1996	19 November 1998	Social Democratic Union of Macedonia
3	Savo Klimovski (born 1947)		19 November 1998	30 November 2000	Democratic Alternative
(1)	Stojan Andov (1935–2024)		30 November 2000	4 October 2002	Liberal Party of Macedonia
4	Nikola Popovski (born 1962)		4 October 2002	8 November 2003	Social Democratic Union of Macedonia
–	Liljana Popovska (born 1956)		8 November 2003	8 November 2003	Liberal Democratic Party
5	Ljupčo Jordanovski (1953–2010)		8 November 2003	2 August 2006	Social Democratic Union of Macedonia
6	Ljubiša Georgievski (1937–2018)		2 August 2006	21 June 2008	VMRO-DPMNE
7	Trajko Veljanovski (born 1962)		21 June 2008	17 October 2016	VMRO-DPMNE
8	Talat Xhaferi (born 1962)		27 April 2017	25 January 2024	Democratic Union for Integration
9	Jovan Mitreski (born 1980)		26 January 2024	28 May 2024	Social Democratic Union of Macedonia
10	Afrim Gashi (born 1977)		28 May 2024	Incumbent	Alternative

== See also ==
- President of North Macedonia
- Prime Minister of North Macedonia
