= Igor Janušev =

Macedonian politician

General Secretary of Government of North Macedonia
- Incumbent
- Assumed office 2024
- Preceded by: Metodija Dimovski

Member of the Assembly of North Macedonia
- In office 2020–2024

General Secretary of VMRO-DPMNE
- In office 2018–2020
- Preceded by: Hristijan Mickoski

Personal details
- Born: 13 November 1983 (age 42) Titov Veles, SR Macedonia, Yugoslavia
- Party: VMRO-DPMNE
- Occupation: Aviation

Igor Janušev (Macedonian: Игор Јанушев; born November 13, 1983) is a Macedonian politician. He is General Secretary of Government of North Macedonia and former General Secretary of VMRO-DPMNE from 2018 to 2020. and former the Head of General Affairs Department Ministry of Transport and Communications of the Republic of Macedonia from 2007 to 2015.

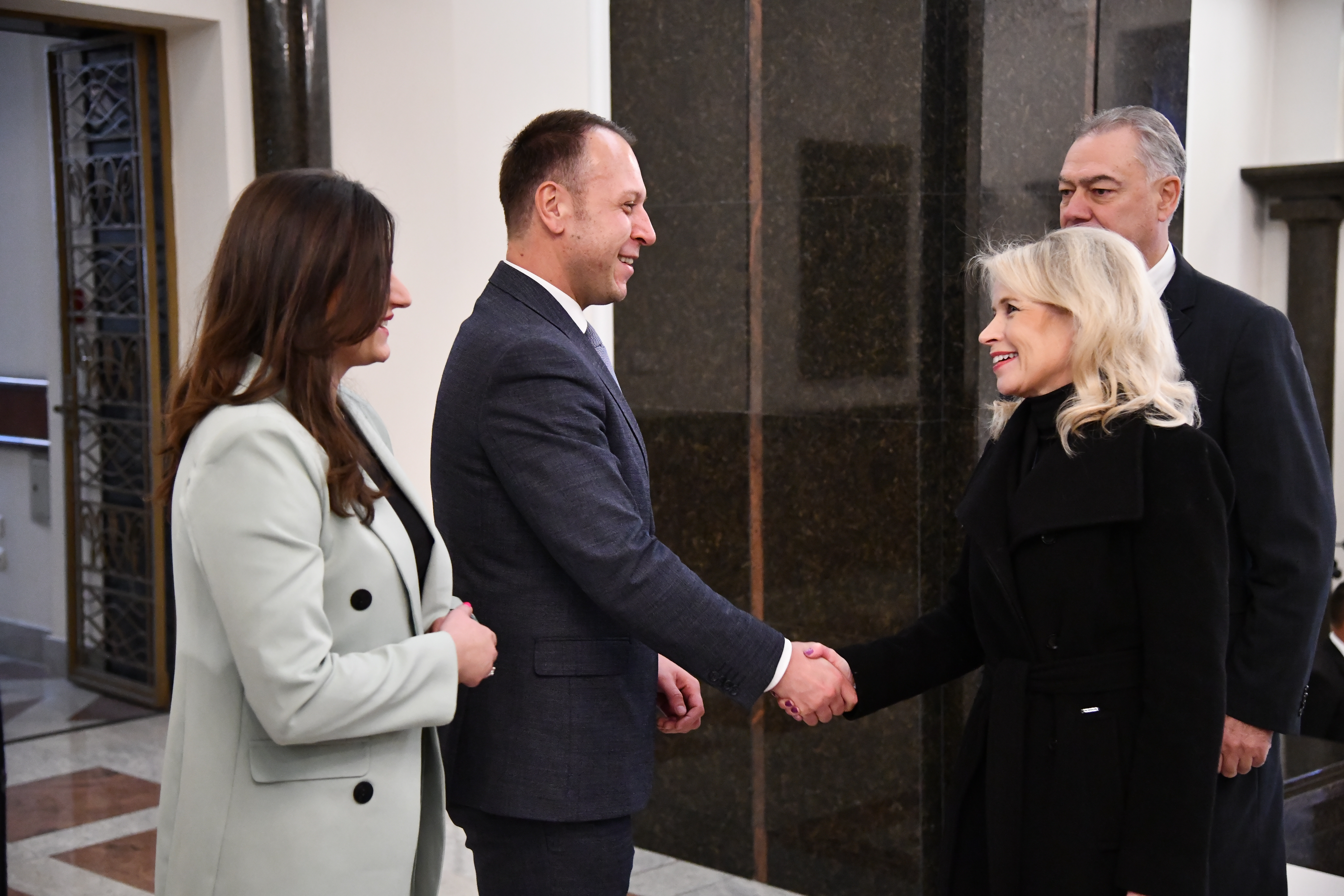
Igor Janushev and Finnish politician Pia Kauma

== Early life and education ==
In 2006, Janusev graduated from the "Justinian Primus" Faculty of Law of Ss. Cyril and Methodius University of Skopje - In following year, he did his postgraduate studies at the International Law and International Relations in Skopje.

== Career ==
He serves in Ministry of Transport and Communications in 2007 - 2015, He serves as General Director of the Public Transport Company "SKOPJE" - Skopje (JSP) in 2015 - 2017
