= Izet Mexhiti =

Macedonian politician

- Изет Меџити
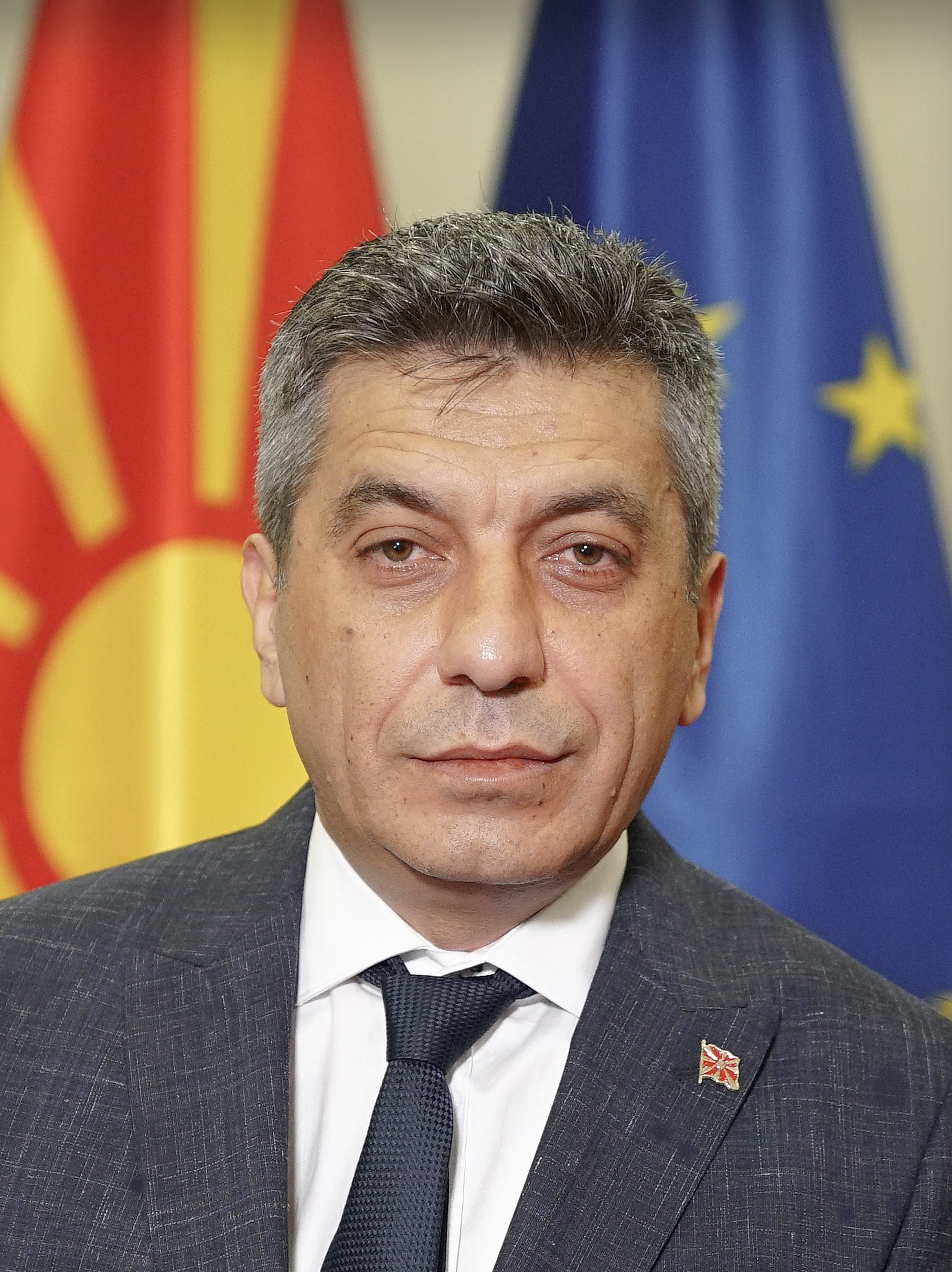

Mayor of Čair Municipality
- Incumbent
- Assumed office 4 November 2025
- Preceded by: Visar Ganiu
- In office 15 April 2005 – 6 November 2017
- Preceded by: Ace Milenkovski
- Succeeded by: Visar Ganiu

Ministry of Environment and Physical Planning
- In office 23 July 2024 – 4 November 2025
- President: Gordana Siljanovska-Davkova
- Preceded by: Kaya Shukova
- Succeeded by: Muhamed Hoxha

Deputy Prime Minister of North Macedonia
- In office 23 July 2024 – 4 November 2025
- President: Gordana Siljanovska-Davkova
- Prime Minister: Hristijan Mickoski

Personal details
- Born: 8 February 1977 (age 49) Skopje, SR Macedonia, Yugoslavia
- Party: BDI (2005–2024); Democratic Movement (2024–2026); VLEN (2024–present)
- Spouse: Ava Mexhiti
- Education: Ss. Cyril and Methodius University of Skopje
- Profession: Economist

Izet Mexhiti is a North Macedonian politician of Albanian descent. He was mayor of the Čair municipality from 2005 to 2017, and has been serving a second term in office since 2025. He is also a former member of parliament and minister for the environment, and has also served as deputy prime minister of North Macedonia.
