= Vasko Shutarov =

Academic specializing in public and cultural diplomacy

Vasko Shutarov, Director of Macedonian Cultural Center in Belgrade

Vasko Šutarov (born June 9, 1964, in Kavadarci) is a Macedonian political scientist, diplomat, and former Member of the Assembly of North Macedonia from Gevgelija.

== Career ==
Šutarov served as a councillor in the Municipal Council of Gevgelija from 2000 to 2006. He was a Member of Parliament in the Assembly of the Republic of Macedonia from 2006 to 2011.

From 2011 to 2017, Šutarov served as Minister-Counsellor at the Embassy of the Republic of Macedonia in Sofia, Republic of Bulgaria, and concurrently as Director of the Macedonian Cultural and Information Centre in Sofia.

Since 2025, Šutarov has been Director of the Macedonian Cultural and Information Centre in Belgrade.

== Publications ==
He is the author of the following books: Public and Cultural Diplomacy (Panili, Skopje, 2014); Public and Cultural Diplomacy (Isida, Sofia, 2016); The Cultural Diplomacy of the SFRY and the Cultural Diplomacies of the Successor States (Printing House “Sofia”, Bogdanci, 2019); With a Grain of Salt and a Piece of Lokum: Quarantine Columns and Essays (Makevej, Skopje, 2021); When the Homeland Becomes a Child, and the Truth – a Struggle (Columns and Essays) (Makevej, 2022); and Memory, Forgetting and Other Important Things: (Columns August 2022 – August 2024) (Makevej, 2024).
