= Teuta Arifi =

Macedonian politician of Albanian origin

- Теута Арифи
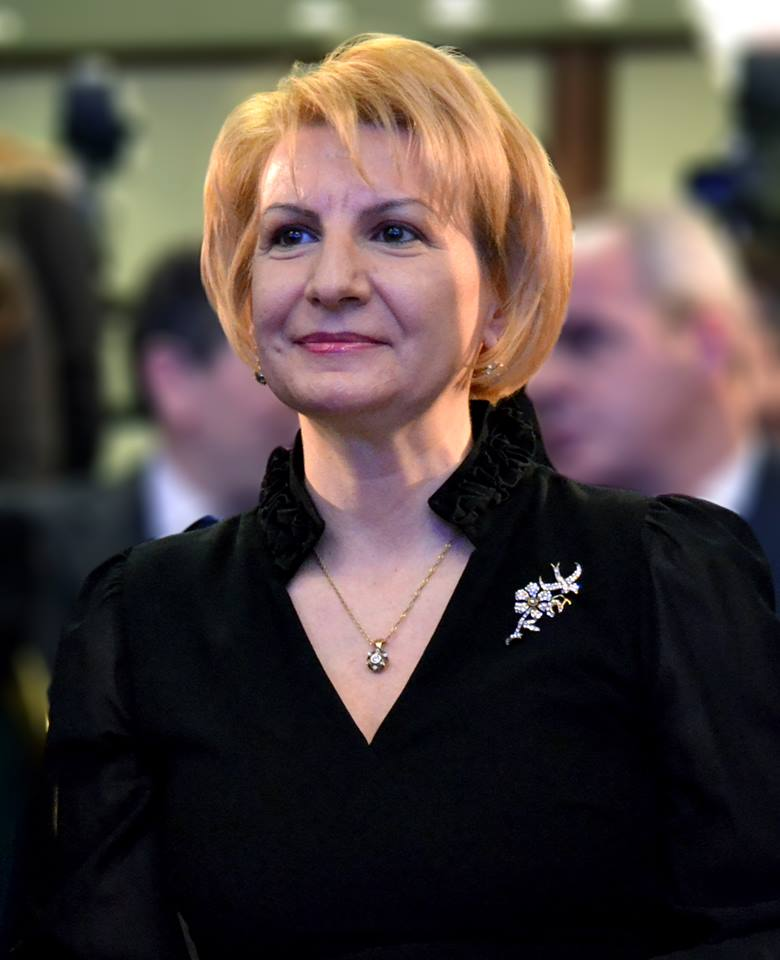
- Arifi in 2016

Mayor of Municipality of Tetovo
- In office April 2013 – October 2021
- Preceded by: Sadi Bexheti
- Succeeded by: Bilal Kasami

Personal details
- Born: 19 October 1969 (age 56) Tetovo, SR Macedonia, SFR Yugoslavia
- Party: Democratic Union for Integration
- Ethnicity: Albanian

Teuta Arifi (Macedonian: Теута Арифи; born 19 October 1969) is a Macedonian politician of Albanian origin.

In 2002, Arifi became the first Albanian woman elected to the Assembly of the Republic of Macedonia. Her political career continued with re-elections as a Member of Parliament in 2006, 2008, and 2011. She also serves as the Vice-President of the Democratic Union for Integration (DUI), a significant political party representing the Albanian community in North Macedonia. In April 2013, she assumed the role of the Mayor of the Municipality of Tetovo.

== Education ==
In 1991, Arifi graduated with a bachelor's degree in philology from the University of Prishtina. In 1992, she participated in a fellowship at the Women Leadership Institute in Santa Fe, New Mexico, USA. She earned a master's degree in philosophy from Ss. Cyril & Methodius University of Skopje in 1995. Arifi served as a research fellow at the CORE Institute, specializing in OSCE studies at Hamburg University from 1999 to 2001. In 2000, she obtained a PhD in Philology from Ss. Cyril & Methodius University. Her doctoral thesis focused on the nuanced representation of women in Albanian traditional law and Albanian literature since the early 20th century.

Arifi's native language is Albanian. She is proficient in Macedonian, Turkish, English, French, Italian, and Serbo-Croatian.

== Career ==
=== Journalism and academia ===
From 1991 to 1992, Arifi served as a columnist for the political weekly KOHA in Pristina, followed by a decade-long tenure as an anchor for Radio Deutsche Welle in the South European Department from 1992 to 2002. She then acted as an adviser in the Republic of Macedonia's government between 1995 and 1996, before taking on an advisory role in the Ministry of Foreign Affairs from 1996 to 1997.

Transitioning to academia, Arifi assumed the position of Assistant Professor at the University Ss. Cyril and Methodius in Skopje in 1997, focusing on the history of Albanian literature. From 1998 to 2000, she served as deputy chair of the group of specialists of the Council of Europe on positive actions in the field of equality between women and men. From 1999 to 2001, Arifi was a member of the research team of the Peace Institute at the University of Hamburg, focusing on the work of the High Commissioner of Minorities in OSCE. In 2001, she was Associate Professor in Multicultural Studies at the Teacher Training Faculty of South East European University in Tetovo.

=== Politics ===
In 2002, Arifi ventured into politics, serving as Deputy President of the Democratic Union for Integration, a prominent political party of Albanians in Macedonia. Her political career continued with parliamentary roles, including Head of the Committee for International Relations, member of the Delegation of the Assembly of North Macedonia to the Council of Europe, and Head of the Macedonian parliamentary delegation to NATO from 2002 to 2006. In subsequent years, she took on roles as a columnist for the daily Macedonian newspaper Dnevnik in 2006 and continued her parliamentary service as the Head of the Committee for Cultural Issues from 2006 to 2008. Arifi was Deputy Prime Minister for European Affairs from 2011 to 2013. On 12 April 2013, she was elected mayor of the municipality of Tetovo.

Arifi has participated in international diplomatic efforts, representing the Republic of Macedonia at the 4th World Conference on Women Rights in September 1995, and joining the OSCE team for the observation of parliamentary elections in Albania in May 1996.

Arifi is a founding member of the Helsinki Committee for Human Rights of the Republic of North Macedonia and the League of Albanian Women on North Macedonia. From 1992 to 1994, she served as the Secretary-General of the Helsinki Citizens Assembly Committee in Macedonia. Between December 1995 and June 1996, Arifi contributed to the Soros Open Society Institute in Macedonia as a member of the board. From 1996 to 2000, she held a role in the Bureau of the Steering Committee on equality of the Council of Europe in Strasbourg.

== Selected publications ==
- “Gjeografia ime” (My geography), 1996
- “Feminizmi ekzistencialist” (Existential Feminism), 1997
- “Uchestvo na zhenite vo sovremenite trendovi vo Republika Makedonija” (The participation of women in the contemporary trends of Macedonian Society) –study, co-authored, Friedrich Ebert Stiftung, 1997;
- "Shatë ditë magjike” (Seven magic days), 1998
