= List of intelligence agencies of North Macedonia =

This is a list of current and former intelligence agencies in North Macedonia and Yugoslav Macedonia.

== Currently active ==
- Military Service for Security and Intelligence-G2 (MSSI) (national military intelligence and security service)
- Administration for Security and Counterintelligence (ASC) (national police intelligence and security agency)
- Intelligence Agency (IA) (national civilian intelligence and security agency)

== Former agencies (Yugoslavia) ==
- (Socialist Federal Republic of Yugoslavia) Department of National Security - national civilian intelligence and security agency
- (Socialist Federal Republic of Yugoslavia) State Security Administration - national secret police intelligence and security agency
- (Socialist Federal Republic of Yugoslavia) Counterintelligence Service - national military intelligence and counterintelligence service 1941-1991

== See also ==
- List of intelligence agencies
