= Dosta Dimovska =

Macedonian poet and politician

- Доста Димовска

Member of Assembly of Macedonia
- In office 1991–1995
- President: Kiro Gligorov
- Prime Minister: Branko Crvenkovski

Deputy Prime Minister of Macedonian Government
- In office 1998–1999
- President: Kiro Gligorov; Boris Trajkovski
- Prime Minister: Ljubčo Georgievski

Minister of Internal Affairs of Macedonia
- In office December 22, 1999 – May 13, 2001
- Preceded by: Pavle Trajanov
- Succeeded by: Ljube Boškoski

Director of Intelligence Agency of Macedonia
- In office February 25, 2002 – May 5, 2003

Director of Macedonian Cultural Center in Bulgaria
- In office 2007–2011

Personal details
- Born: February 17, 1954 Skopje, PR Macedonia, FPR Yugoslavia (present-day North Macedonia)
- Died: April 11, 2011 (aged 57) Sofia, Bulgaria
- Resting place: Butel, North Macedonia
- Party: VMRO-DPMNE
- Occupation: Politician

Dosta Dimovska (Macedonian: Доста Димовска; February 17, 1954 – April 11, 2011) was a Macedonian poet and politician. She graduated Philosophy at Skopje University. Dimovska is a Bulgarian citizen.

She died on 11 April 2011 after a brief illness.

== Career ==
She was also a deputy president of VMRO-DPMNE from 1991 till 2002.

== See also ==
- VMRO-DPMNE

Political offices
Preceded by Pavle Trajanov	Minister of Internal Affairs; 1999–2001	Succeeded by Ljube Boškoski
