= Rashela Mizrahi =

Macedonian politician

- Рашела Мизрахи
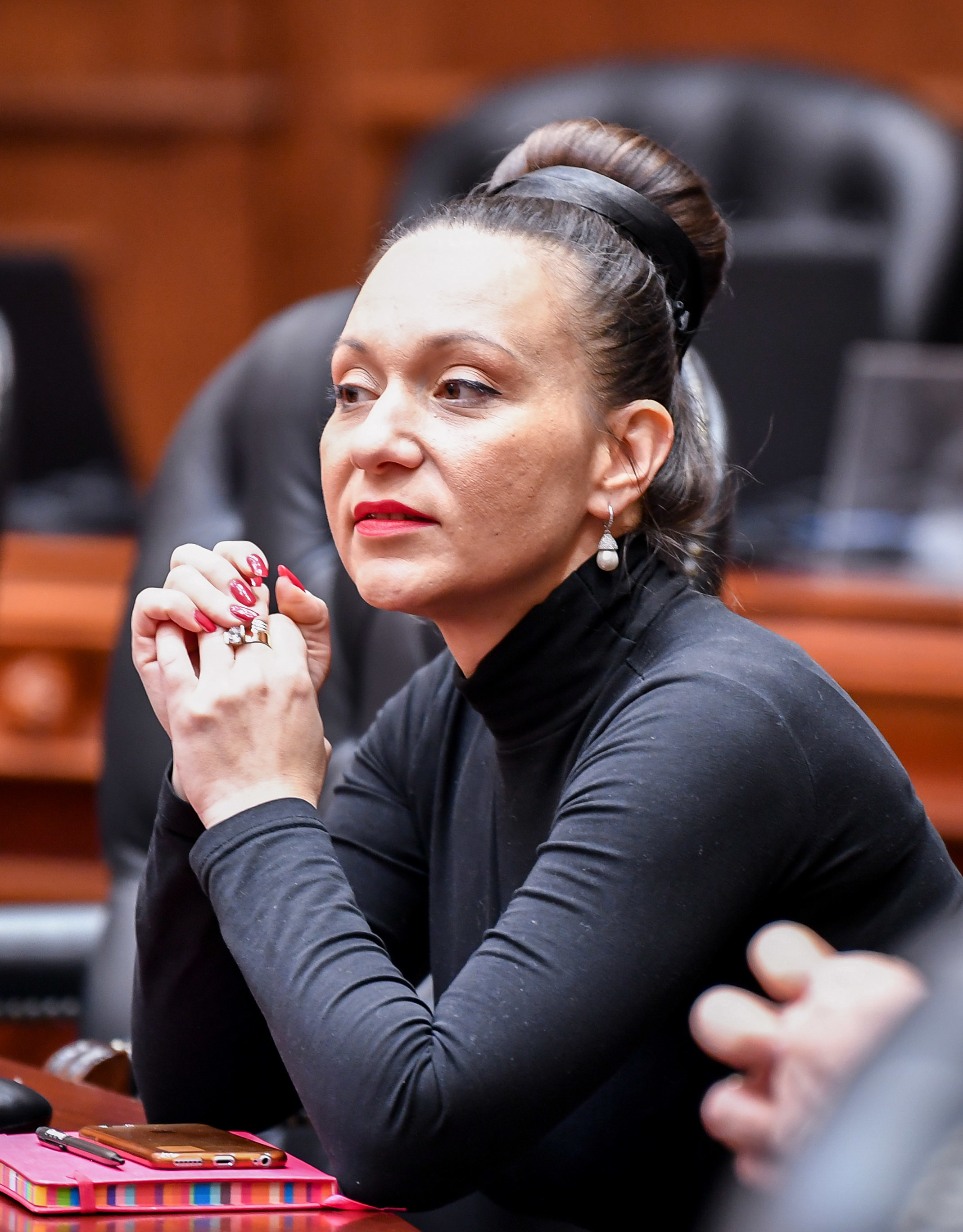
- Mizrahi in January 2020.

Minister of Labor and Social Policy
- In office January 3, 2020 – February 15, 2020
- Prime Minister: Oliver Spasovski
- Preceded by: Mila Carovska
- Succeeded by: Jagoda Šahpaska

Personal details
- Born: November 24, 1981 (age 44) Skopje, SFR Yugoslavia
- Party: VMRO-DPMNE

Rashela Mizrahi (Macedonian: Рашела Мизрахи) is a Macedonian veterinarian and politician, who was the first Jewish minister of North Macedonia. A member of the VMRO-DPMNE party, she was dismissed in February 2020 after appearing with signs of the country's previous name (Macedonia).

== Early life ==
Rashela Mizrahi was born on November 24, 1981, in Skopje, SFR Yugoslavia, to Viktor and Liljana Mizrahi. She has a brother, Rahamim. Many of her family members were murdered in the Holocaust.

Mizrahi worked at Ss. Cyril and Methodius University of Skopje from 2007 to 2009.

== Dismissal ==
Mizrahi caused controversy when she stood in front of a plaque with the country's former name, the Republic of Macedonia, instead of the Republic of North Macedonia. Minister of Foreign Affairs, Nikola Dimitrov, received a verbal note of protest from the Greek government. On February 15, 2020, the Assembly of North Macedonia voted to dismiss Mizrahi, with 62 votes for dismissal and 26 votes against.

== Re-election ==
In the parliamentary elections of June 2020, Mizrahi was again elected to the Assembly of North Macedonia. Among her responsibilities is the presidency of the North Macedonia - Israel Inter-Parliamentary Friendship Group.
