= Afrim Gashi =

Politician from North Macedonia

- Африм Гаши
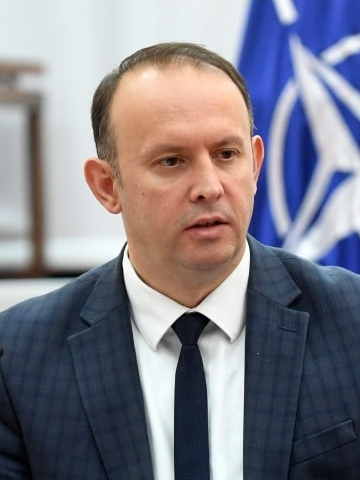
- Gashi in 2021

President of the Assembly of North Macedonia
- Incumbent
- Assumed office 28 May 2024
- Preceded by: Jovan Mitreski

Personal details
- Born: 9 November 1977 (age 49)
- Party: Besa Movement (2014–2018); Alternativa (2018–2026); VLEN (2024–present)
- Education: State University of Tetova; Ss. Cyril and Methodius University of Skopje

Afrim Gashi (Macedonian: Африм Гаши; born 9 November 1977) is a Macedonian politician who has been the President of the Assembly of North Macedonia since 2024, and a member of the assembly since 2016. He was elected as a member of the Besa Movement, which he co-founded with Bilal Kasami, but left to form Alternativa.

== Early life and education ==
Afrim Gashi was born on 9 November 1977, and is of Albanian descent. He graduated from State University of Tetova with a law degree after attending from 2004 to 2007, and Ss. Cyril and Methodius University of Skopje with a master's degree in political science after attending from 2009 to 2021. Gashi was an elementary school teacher from 2003 to 2004.

== Career ==
=== Media ===
Gashi worked as a programme moderator at the Skopje radio station Radio FERA from 1995 to 1996, and at TV ERA from 1996 to 1997. He was an editor for Logos-А from 2008 to 2017, and a columnist for Koha from 2010 to 2011. Shenja, an Albanian-language political magazine that covered politics and culture, employed him as chief editor from 2011 to 2014.

=== Politics ===
After the Kosovo War he worked for a non-governmental organization that helped socialise children. He surveyed refugees from Kosovo for the United Nations High Commissioner for Refugees in 2001. He was a group supervisor for UNICEF in Aračinovo after the insurgency in 2001. In 2009, Gashi was Deputy Secretary of the Studeničani Election Committeex.

Bilal Kasami and Gashi founded Besa Movement in 2014, and Gashi served as its secretary general from 2014 to 2018. Gashi split from the Besa Movement and formed Alternative after a court ruled that Kasami would remain leader of the party. He was president of Alternative from 2018 to 2024. In the 2016 election he won a seat in the Assembly of North Macedonia. During his tenure in the assembly he served on the Local Self-Government, European Affairs, Elections and Appointments, Constitutional Affairs, and Foreign Policy committees.

On 28 May 2024, Gashi was elected President of the assembly.

== Personal life ==
Gashi is a native speaker of Albanian and can also speak Macedonian, English, Bosnian, Serbian, and Croatian.

== Works cited ==
=== News ===
- Dichoska, Tamara (28 May 2024). "Од рапер до претседател на Собрание - Кој е Африм Гаши?". Sitel. Archived from the original on 30 June 2025.

=== Web ===
- "Afrim Gashi". Assembly of North Macedonia. Archived from the original on 30 June 2025.
- "North Macedonia". Inter-Parliamentary Union. Archived from the original on 30 June 2025.
