= Beti Rabadzievska-Naumovska =

Macedonian physician and politician

- Бети Рабаџиевска-Наумовска

Member of the Assembly of North Macedonia
- Incumbent
- Assumed office 2016

Personal details
- Born: 24 September 1973 (age 52) Resen, SR Macedonia, Yugoslavia
- Education: University of Skopje

Beti Rabadzievska-Naumovska (Macedonian: Бети Рабаџиевска-Наумовска, born 24 September 1973) is a Macedonian physician and politician. She has been a member of the Assembly of North Macedonia since 2016.

== Biography ==
Rabadzievska-Naumovska was born on 24 September 1973, in the town of Resen, then in the Socialist Republic of Macedonia. She graduated from the Faculty of Medicine of the University of Skopje and became a specialist in otorhinolaryngology.

In 2016, Rabadzievska-Naumovska was elected as a deputy of the Social Democratic Union of Macedonia in the Assembly of North Macedonia. On 15 July 2020, she was again elected as an MP.
