= Stojan Andov =

Macedonian politician (1935–2024)

- Стојан Андов
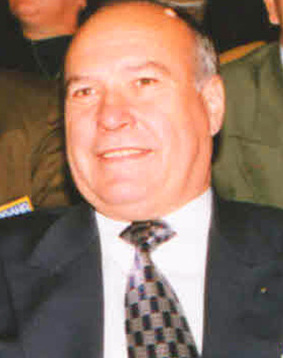
- Andov in 1996

Acting President of Macedonia
- In office 4 October 1995 – 10 January 1996
- Prime Minister: Branko Crvenkovski
- Preceded by: Kiro Gligorov
- Succeeded by: Kiro Gligorov

Speaker of the Assembly of the Republic of Macedonia
- In office 8 January 1991 – 6 March 1996
- Preceded by: Vulnet Starova (as President of the People's Assembly of the SRM)
- Succeeded by: Tito Petkovski
- In office 30 November 2000 – 3 October 2002
- Preceded by: Savo Klimovski
- Succeeded by: Nikola Popovski

Member of the Assembly
- In office 8 January 1991 – 27 June 2011

Leader of the Liberal Party of Macedonia
- In office 5 October 1990 – 19 April 1997
- Preceded by: Party established
- Succeeded by: Party merged into LDP
- In office 2001 – 19 July 2008
- Preceded by: Risto Gušterov
- Succeeded by: Borče Stojanovski

Personal details
- Born: Stojan Andov; 30 November 1935 Kavadarci, Vardar Banovina, Yugoslavia
- Died: 18 June 2024 (aged 88)
- Party: Liberal Party (1990–1997, 1999–2004); Liberal Democratic Party (1997–1999)
- Education: Ss. Cyril and Methodius University of Skopje; University of Belgrade
- Occupation: Politician, economist, writer

Stojan Andov (Macedonian: Стојан Андов; 30 November 1935 – 18 June 2024) was a Macedonian politician, a founding member of the Liberal Party of Macedonia, and a president of Assembly.

== Early years and education ==
Stojan Andov was born in Kavadarci, Yugoslavia (now North Macedonia) on 30 November 1935, where he attended primary school and high school. Andov graduated from the Faculty of Economics in the Ss. Cyril and Methodius University of Skopje, and received a master's degree at the Faculty of Political Sciences in the University of Belgrade.

== Political career ==
At the fifth congress of the League of Communists of Macedonia (LCM), he was elected as a member of the permanent part of the Conference of the party, chairman of the Commission of the Central Committee of the LCM for socio-economic relations and economic policy, member of the management board of the Association of Economists of Macedonia and member of the Economic Council of the Assembly of Socialist Republic of Macedonia (SRM). From 1971 to 1982, he was a member of the Federal Executive Council in Belgrade, chairman of the Federal Commission for Economic Cooperation with Developing Countries, chairman of the Inter-Republican Committee for Foreign Exchange and Foreign Trade System, chairman of part of the Yugoslav Joint Committee on cooperation with Egypt, Libya, Tunisia, Turkey and France. He served as the president of the Commission for Coordination of Cooperation with the European Economic Community and EFTA countries from 1978 to 1982, as well as vice-president of the Executive Council of the SRM Assembly from 1982 to 1986 and member of the Macedonian Delegation at the Assembly of Republics and Regions of Yugoslavia from 1986 to 1987. He was also the ambassador of Yugoslavia in Iraq from 1987 to 1991.

As a founder of the Liberal Party, Andov led it as president from 1990 to 1997. He was the first president of Assembly of the independent Republic of Macedonia from 8 January 1991 to 6 March 1996, up to the time of the Liberal Party's merger with the former Democratic Party (DP). Andov became president of the Council of the newly established political party. After the renewal of the Liberal Party of Macedonia in 1999, he was elected member of its executive committee. Andov was elected president on the fifth congress of LP once again in June 2001 and was re-elected president of LP on the eighth Congress of LP in July 2004.

During the first multi-party elections in 1990, Andov was elected member of the Assembly and became President of the Assembly in January 1991, serving from 8 January 1991 to 19 November 1994. During the second elections in 1994, he was re-elected as president of the Assembly, a position he held from 19 November until 6 March 1996. In this capacity, he was serving as interim president of the Republic of Macedonia from 4 October 1995 to 10 January 1996 in the sick absence of Kiro Gligorov after the assassination attempt on him.

Andov was elected member of the Assembly in the 1998 elections and was president of the Parliamentary Committee on monetary, credit policy, and banking. In 1999 he was a candidate for President of the Republic of Macedonia of the Liberal Democratic Party, but he did not qualify for the second round. On 30 November 2000, he was elected President of the Assembly and performed this duty up to 3 October 2002. From 2001 to 2008 he was for a second time chairman of the Liberal Party of Macedonia, until he was succeeded by Borče Stojanovski. At the end of 2006, he proposed a law to exclude Yugoslav secret police informants from holding public office. Civil society representatives criticized the proposal. The Helsinki Committee for Human Rights of the Republic of Macedonia (HCHRRM) criticized the proposal on the basis that it had important deficiencies and endangered human rights and the rule of law. The law was adopted in January 2008. Andov was the president of the Permanent Committee on Citizens' Freedoms and Rights of the Macedonian Assembly from 2002 to 2006.

== Personal life ==
Andov was married and had two children. His wife Marija died in January 2014.

After his retirement, he authored the following books: "На мој начин" (My own way), "Од мој агол" (From my angle), "Патувањата на далечниот исток - Ирак" (Travels in the Far East - Iraq), "Ставот и Љубовта" (Attitude and Love), "Кицо американецот" (Kiko the American), "Приказната на Марија" (Maria's story), "Успеси и заговори" (Successes and conspiracies), "Јосип Броз Тито и распаѓањето на Југославија" (Josip Broz Tito and the breakup of Yugoslavia), "Драматичната 1991 година" (The dramatic year 1991), "1992 – година на опасни ризици" (1992 - a year of dangerous risks), "До атентатот и по него" (To the Assassination and After It).

On 21 March 2019, the Skopje Basic Court temporarily banned the sale of his book "To the Assassination and After It", after the former minister of internal affairs Ljubomir Frčkoski filed a lawsuit for defamation. According to the court, it was implied in the book that Frčkoski was involved in the assassination attempt of Kiro Gligorov. The Skopje Appellate Court revoked the ban on 15 May, after Andov's lawyer appealed against the decision.

In a television debate show, in November 2020, he opined: "The Macedonian people, nor the politicians, must not accept anything that indicates that Macedonia and Bulgaria have the same history. That is not true and such a thing must never be accepted. Such notorious lies and fabrications may serve them, but not Macedonia." In 2021, he received the Order 8-September for his contribution to the independence of North Macedonia.

Andov died on 18 June 2024, at the age of 88. A commemorative session was held in the Assembly in the next day to honor him.
