= Forino, Gostivar =

Forino Форино Forinë
- Village
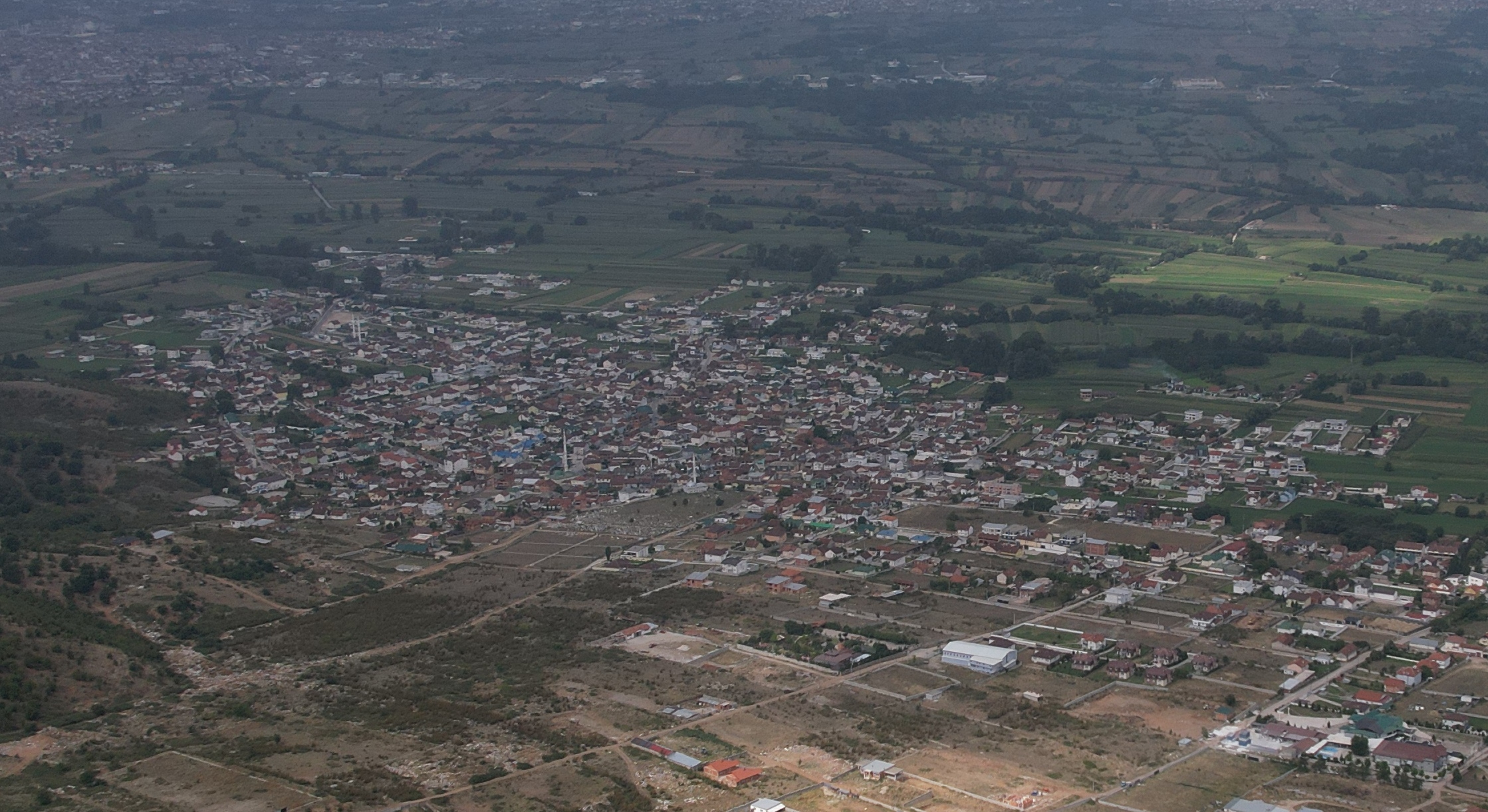
- Airview of the village

- Location within Macedonia
- Coordinates: 41°49′N 20°58′E
- Country: North Macedonia
- Region: Polog
- Municipality: Gostivar

Population (2021)
  - Total: 2,809
  - Density: 2.22/km^{2} (5.74/sq mi)
- Time zone: UTC+1 (CET)
  - Summer (DST): UTC+2 (CEST)
- Postal code: 1237
- Area code: 042
- Car plates: GV
- Website: .

Forino (Macedonian: Форино; Albanian: Forinë) is a village in the municipality of Gostivar, North Macedonia. Forino's distance is 5.15 km / 3.2 mi away from the center of the municipality.

== Demographics ==
Forino is attested in the 1467/68 Ottoman tax registry (defter) for the Nahiyah of Kalkandelen. The village had a total of 38 Christian households 2 bachelors and 4 widows.

As of the 2021 census, Forino had 2,809 residents with the following ethnic composition:

- Albanians 2,710
- Persons for whom data are taken from administrative sources 94
- Others 5

According to the 2002 census, the village had a total of 4,652 inhabitants. Ethnic groups in the village include:

- Albanians 4,624
- Serbs 1
- Bosniaks 1
- Others 26

According to the 1942 Albanian census, Forino was inhabited by 1403 Muslim Albanians.

== Sports ==
Local football club KF Vardari plays in the Macedonian Second League (West Division).

== Notable people ==
- Talat Xhaferi, Prime minister of North Macedonia.
