= Sobranie Palace =

- Палата на Собранието (Macedonian); Pallati i Kuvendit (Albanian)
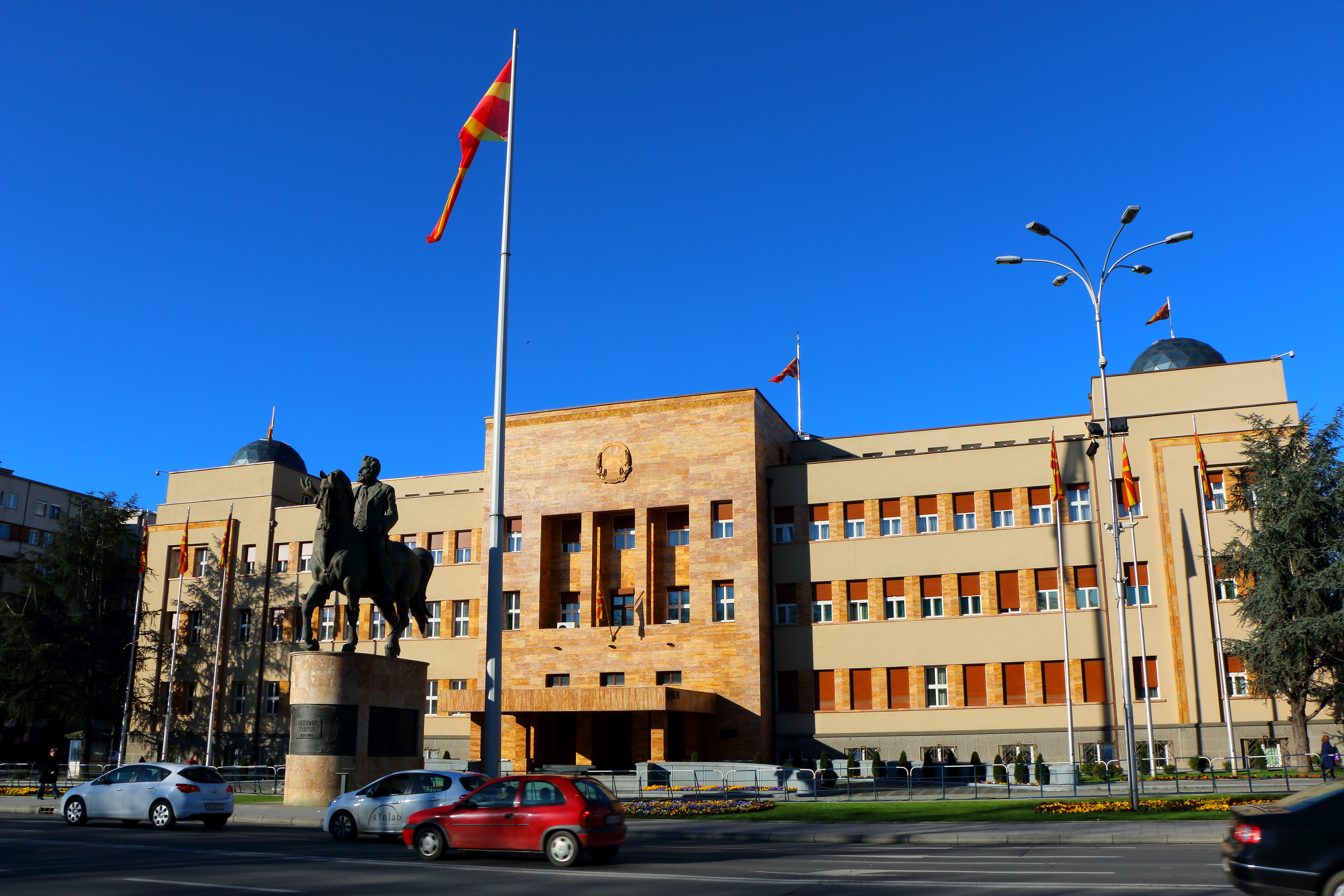
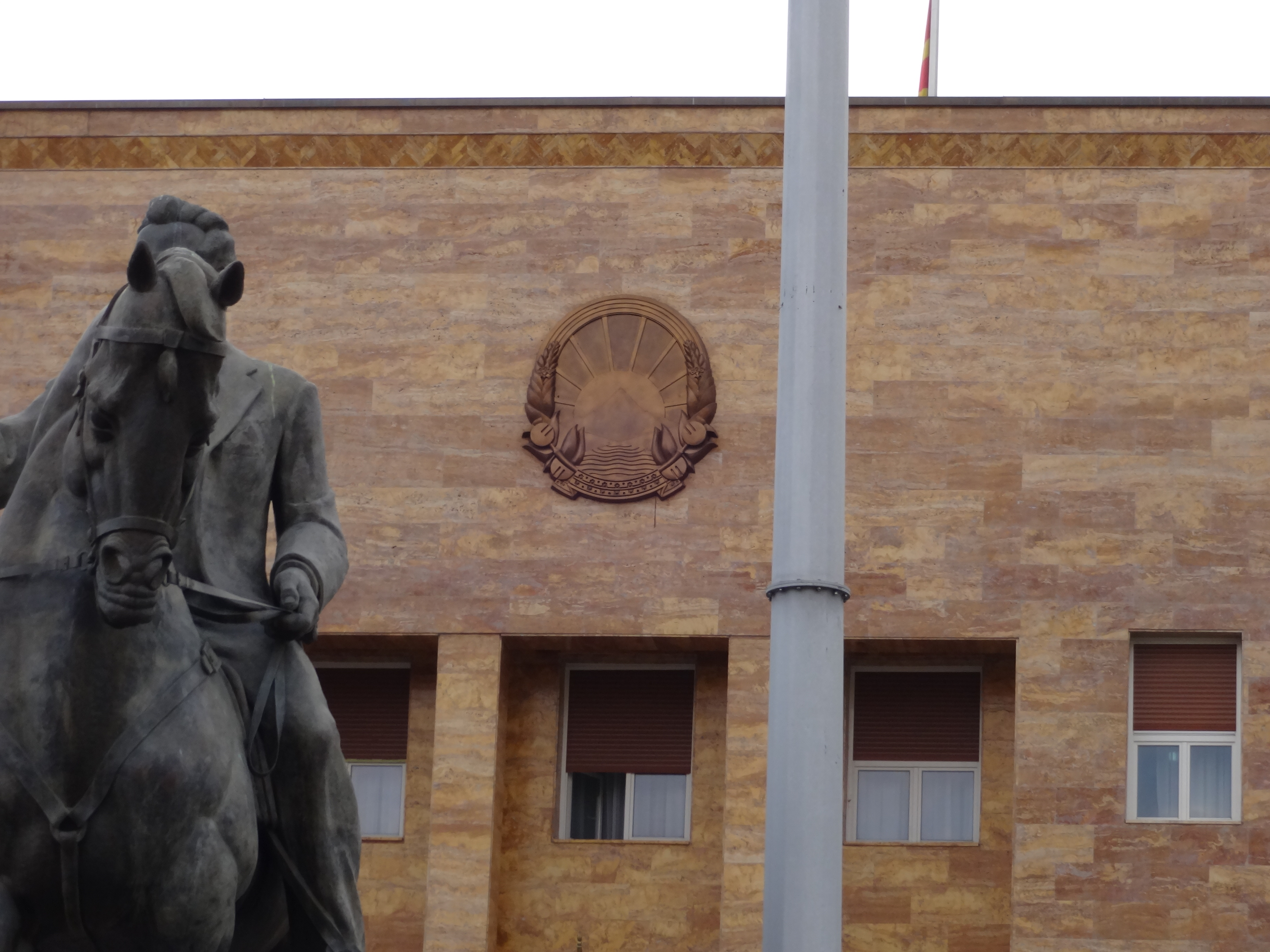
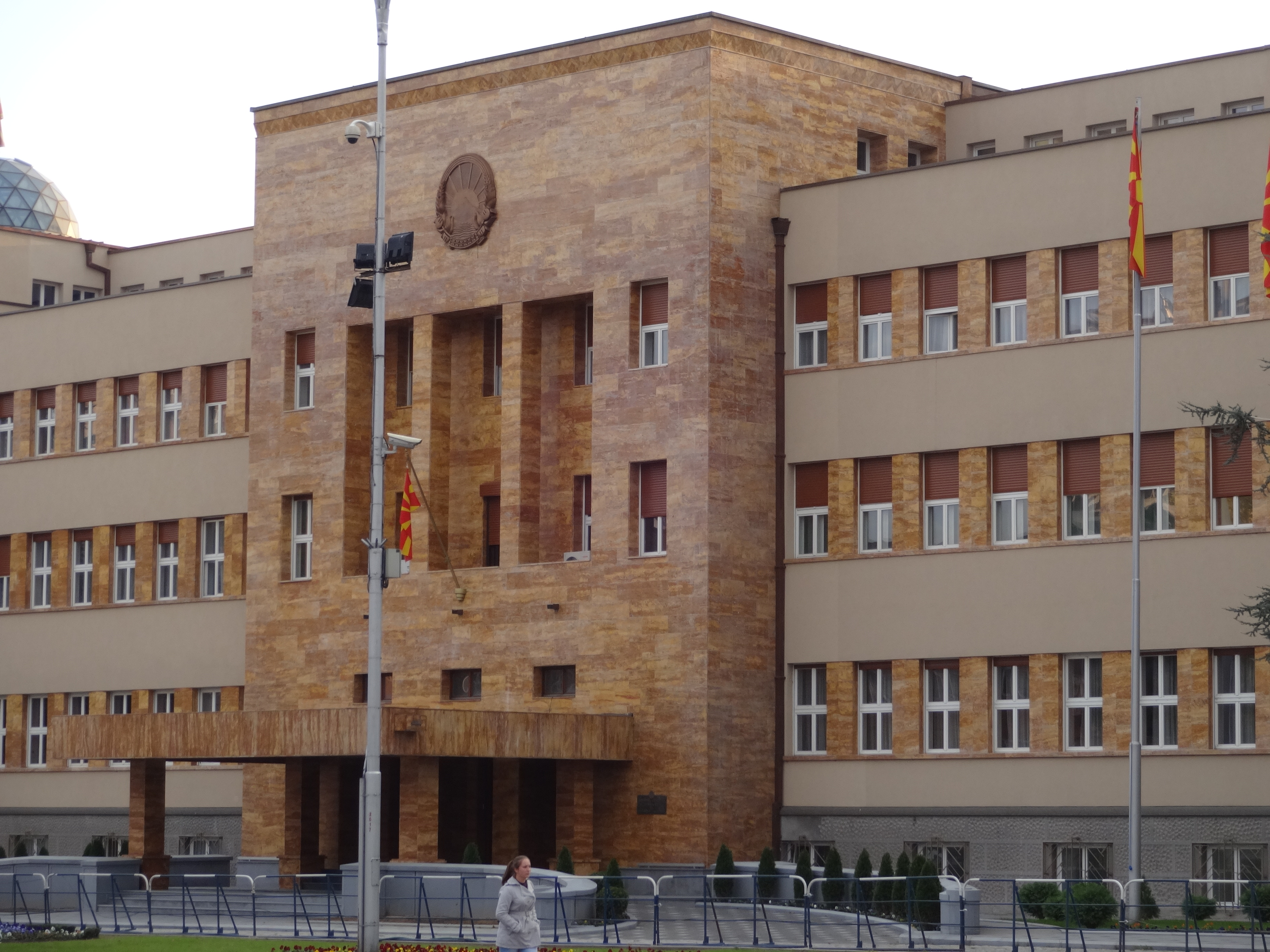

General information
- Architectural style: modernist
- Location: Skopje, North Macedonia
- Coordinates: 41°59′33.7″N 21°25′56.9″E
- Year built: 1938; 88 years ago
- Owner: Assembly of North Macedonia

Design and construction
- Architects: Viktor Lukomski and Victor J. Hudak

The Sobranie Palace (Macedonian: Палата на Собранието, romanized: Palata na Sobranieto, Albanian: Pallati i Kuvendit), in Skopje is the seat of the Assembly of North Macedonia. The building was constructed in 1938 during the existence of the Kingdom of Yugoslavia. Initially intended to house the administration of the Vardar Banovina, it became the seat of the new post-World War II Yugoslav constituent Socialist Republic of Macedonia in 1944. Since 1991, following the country's independence, the building has served as the home of the Assembly of North Macedonia and until 2009 was the office of the President of the Republic of North Macedonia. The palace was the first building affected by the controversial Skopje 2014 project.

== History ==
The design competition for the new building of the Vardar Banovina was announced in 1930 and was won by architect Viktor Lukomski. The building was built in 1938 based on the project by Czech architect Viktor J. Hudec. It was conceived as a modernist project with monumental volume and clean facade elements. The building was used by the Banovina authorities from 1939. After the liberation of Skopje in 1944, the entire administration of the Macedonian People's Government was moved to the building. The Grand Hall and Hall II were constructed between 1954 and 1963. During the 1963 Skopje earthquake, the Parliament building suffered visible damage leading to subsequent restoration which lasted until 1967. After the independence of the Republic of Macedonia in 1991, the building housed not only the Assembly of the Republic of Macedonia but also the Office of the President of the Republic until 12 May 2009.

== See also ==
- Banski Dvor
- Banovina Palace
- Classical Gymnasium in Zagreb
- Government Building and President's Office
