= Intelligence Agency of North Macedonia =

North Macedonian governmental intelligence agency

Intelligence Agency
- Агенција за разузнавање Agjencia e Zbulimit
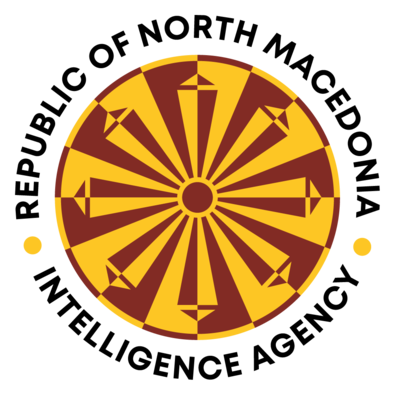
- Emblem of the Intelligence Agency of North Macedonia

Agency overview
- Formed: April 1, 1995; 31 years ago
- Headquarters: Skopje, North Macedonia
- Motto: none
- Agency executive: Erold Musliu, Director
- Website: http://ia.gov.mk

The Intelligence Agency of Republic of North Macedonia (Note: Macedonian: Агенција за разузнавање на Република Северна Македонија; Albanian: Agjencia e Zbulimit të Republikës së Maqedonisë së Veriut) is the national civilian intelligence and security agency of the Republic of North Macedonia. It was set up as a separate body of state administration under the Law on the Intelligence Agency adopted in April 1995.

== Competence ==
The Intelligence Agency (АR) as a special body of state administration and in compliance with the Law of AR is an intelligence service authorized for collection, analysis and processing of the intelligence information relevant for security, defense, political, economic and other interests of the Republic of North Macedonia.

Therefore, the Agency has established and is continually developing appropriate mechanisms for prevention, anticipation, early warning and risks estimation. It informs the state authorities of North Macedonia about the processes that generate threats for the national security and for the permanent and vital principles in order to establish stable secure environment and sustainable long-term development.

The Intelligence Agency represents one of the basic pillars of the intelligence and security system of North Macedonia. It has been constituted upon the intelligence concept as a long-term strategic process for national interests and priorities protection and in accordance with the modern standards for prevention and current security threats and risks management.

The Intelligence Agency is continuously aiming towards enlargement of its capacities in those environments where there are risks for the vital and permanent national interests and is building strategic partnerships that are relevant for the state and represent support of the international security policies. The dynamics of the processes and the joint dependence of the states in the region and in broader surrounding compulsory impose the need for cooperation of the intelligence services on both bilateral and multilateral level.

== Civil control over the Agency ==
The Assembly of North Macedonia oversees the work of the Agency through a corresponding commission. The Commission submits a report to the Assembly of North Macedonia about the activity performed once a year at the most. Prior to submitting the report the commission is obliged to communicate the same to the Director of the Agency.

== Organizational structure ==
=== Directors ===
| # | Portrait | Name | Mandate commenced on | Mandate finished on | Political Party |
|---|---|---|---|---|---|
1991-1995 see State Security Administration
| 1 | | Vlado Popovski | 1995 | ? | SDSM |
| 2 | | Aleksa Stamenkovski | ? | ? | SDSM |
| 3 | | Dragi Grozdanovski | 2000 | 2002 | VMRO-DPMNE |
| 4 | | Dosta Dimovska | 2002 | 2003 | VMRO-DPMNE |
| 5 | | Dragi Grozdanovski; 2nd term | 2003 | 2004 | VMRO-DPMNE |
| 6 | | Lazar Kitanovski | 2004 | 2006 | SDSM |
| 7 | | Kire Naumov | 2006 | 2007 | SDSM |
| 8 | | Viktor Dimovski | 2007 | 2009 | VMRO-DPMNE |
| 9 | | Aleksandar Bocinov | 2009 | 2013 | VMRO-DPMNE |
| 10 | | Nakje Chulev | 2013 | 2017 | Unaffiliated |
| 11 | | Zoran Ivanov | 2017 | 2019 | Unaffiliated |
| 12 | | Erold Musliu | 2019 | incumbent | Unaffiliated |

== See also ==
- List of Directors of Intelligence Agency
- North Macedonia
- Administration for Security and Counterintelligence (Police Agency)
- Military Service for Security and Intelligence-G2 (Military Agency)
