= Bilal Kasami =

Macedonian politician (born 1975)

- Биљал Касами
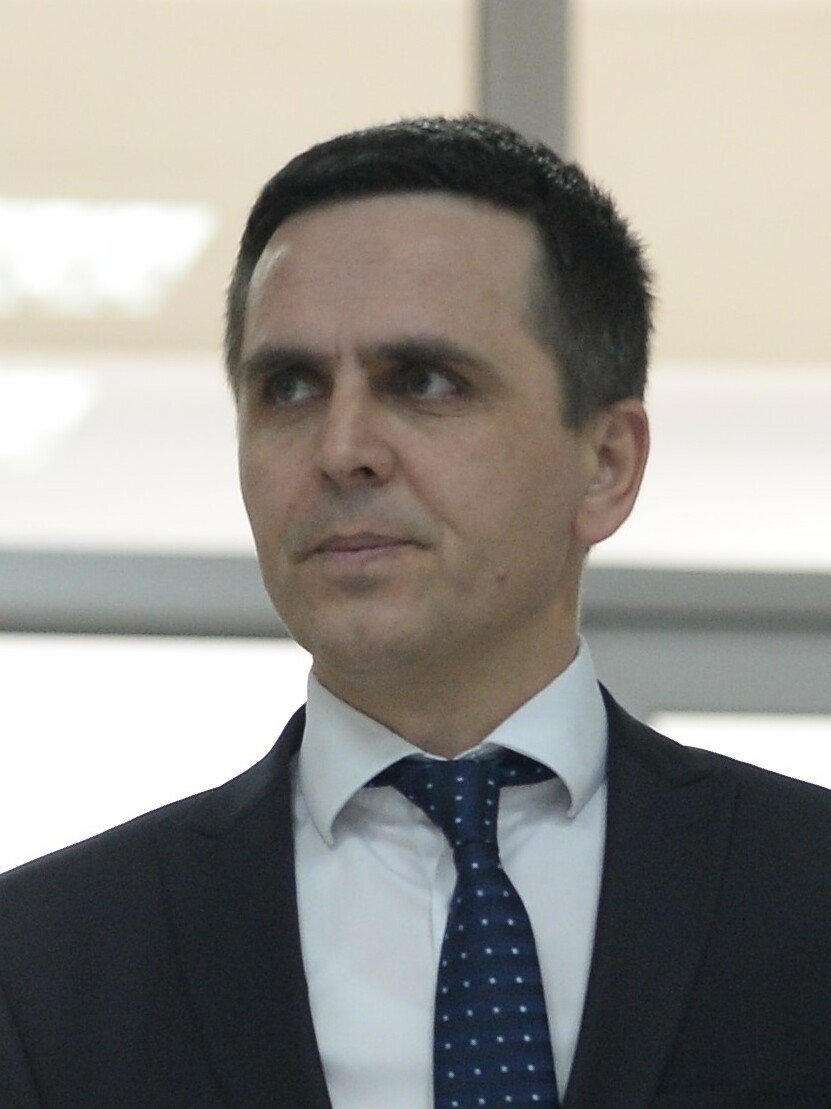

Member of the Assembly of North Macedonia
- In office 2016–2020

Mayor of Tetovo
- In office October 2021 – October 2025
- Preceded by: Teuta Arifi
- Incumbent
- Assumed office October 2025

Personal details
- Born: 31 July 1975 (age 50) Tetovo, SR Macedonia, SFR Yugoslavia
- Party: Democratic Union for Integration (2004–2008); New Democracy (2008–2011); Besa Movement (2014–2026); VLEN (2024–present)

Bilal Kasami (Note: Macedonian: Биљал Касами; Albanian: Bilal Kasami) (born 31 July 1975) is a Macedonian-Albanian politician. He is the president of the Besa Movement party in which he co-founded. He served in the Assembly of North Macedonia from 2016 to 2020. In 2021, he was elected mayor of Tetovo, in 2025 he was elected mayor for the second mandate.

== Biography ==
Kasami completed economic studies at the Ss. Cyril and Methodius University of Skopje in 2000, and in the following four years he worked in the customs administration of North Macedonia. From 2004 to 2006, he was the state secretary in the Ministry of Economy as a member of the Democratic Union for Integration (DUI), but then he returned to the customs office where he stayed for two years. Kasami left DUI in 2008 and joined New Democracy, which became defunct in 2011 due to the poor performance in parliamentary election held that year. At the same time, he was a professor at the International Balkan University (2009–2011), and he returned to politics in 2014 with the founding of the Besa Movement. Kasami ran as part of the Besa Movement and was elected deputy of the 2016-2020 legislature in the Assembly of North Macedonia.

== Personal life ==
Kasami is married to Aisha Kasami and they have two children.
