= Hristijan Mickoski =

Prime Minister of North Macedonia since 2024

- Христијан Мицкоски
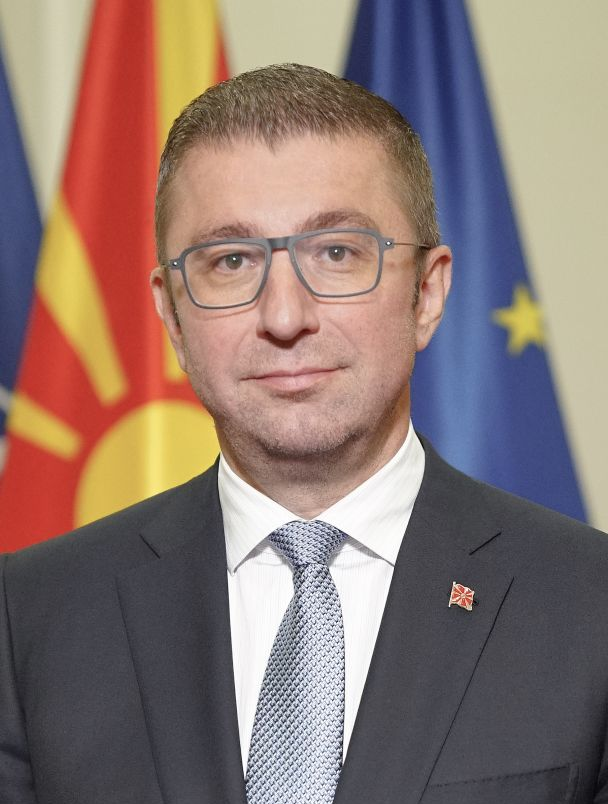
- Official portrait, 2024

Prime Minister of North Macedonia
- Incumbent
- Assumed office 23 June 2024
- President: Gordana Siljanovska-Davkova
- Preceded by: Talat Xhaferi

Leader of the Opposition
- In office 23 December 2017 – 23 June 2024
- Prime Minister: Zoran Zaev; Oliver Spasovski; Zoran Zaev; Dimitar Kovačevski; Talat Xhaferi
- Preceded by: Nikola Gruevski
- Succeeded by: Venko Filipče

President of VMRO-DPMNE
- Incumbent
- Assumed office 23 December 2017
- Preceded by: Nikola Gruevski

Personal details
- Born: 29 September 1977 (age 49) Skopje, SR Macedonia, Yugoslavia
- Party: VMRO-DPMNE
- Children: 2
- Education: Ss. Cyril and Methodius University of Skopje
- Occupation: Mechanical engineer • Politician

Hristijan Mickoski (Note: Macedonian: Христијан Мицкоски, pronounced [ˈxristijan ˈmit͡skɔski]) (born 29 September 1977) is a Macedonian politician, mechanical engineer and university professor serving as Prime Minister of North Macedonia, a position he has held since June 2024. He is the party leader of VMRO-DPMNE. In 2016, Mickoski became the director of Power Plants of Macedonia, and in the period from 2015 to 2017, he was an energy advisor to prime ministers Nikola Gruevski and Emil Dimitriev. As the sole candidate, he was elected leader of VMRO-DPMNE at the party's 16th congress in Valandovo.

== Early life and career ==
Mickoski was born on 29 September 1977 in Skopje, then in Socialist Republic of Macedonia, part of SFR Yugoslavia. From 2016 to 2017, he was the director of Power Plants of Macedonia, the state-owned electricity producing company. He has a PhD degree. In 2011, he was a visiting professor at Vienna's Technical University. He was an associate professor at the Faculty of Mechanical Engineering at the Ss. Cyril and Methodius University in Skopje, but in 2019 he became a regular professor. From 2015 to 2017, he was the energy advisor of prime ministers Nikola Gruevski and Emil Dimitriev.

== Political career ==
=== Party leader ===
After the resignation of Nikola Gruevski, Mickoski became the new leader of the nationalist VMRO-DPMNE party in 23 December 2017 in the party's 16th congress in Valandovo, and thus leader of the opposition in the country.

According to some party members, in his youth Hristijan Mickoski was a candidate of the Liberal Democratic Party for the presidency of the Union of students at St. Cyril and Methodius University in Skopje and a fierce opponent to then ruling VMRO-DPMNE. Other members of VMRO-DPMNE accused him of not being a party member up until 2010. According to Ljubčo Georgievski, Mickoski displayed himself as a party activist firstly in 2016. Mickoski previously was the party's secretary general from July 2017.

The veracity of his pro-EU and pro-NATO orientation has been met with doubt by some political observers. Mickoski has stated that he and his party are in favour of joining the European Union and NATO but not with "capitulation", i.e. rejecting the Prespa Agreement signed with Greece, which resolved the Macedonia naming dispute and secured North Macedonia's NATO accession. He and the party he leads became the main participants of the July 2022 North Macedonia protests against the French proposal for the start of the negotiation process of North Macedonia and the EU. In August 2022, Mickoski promised to leave politics forever, if Bulgarians were recognized in the country's constitution, a mandatory requirement included in the negotiating framework with the EU. In September he proposed a referendum under which the friendship treaty between Bulgaria and North Macedonia would be annulled. Mickoski had close ties with the Hungarian prime minister Viktor Orbán and Serbian president Aleksandar Vučić.

=== Prime Minister (2024–present) ===
==== Election and government ====
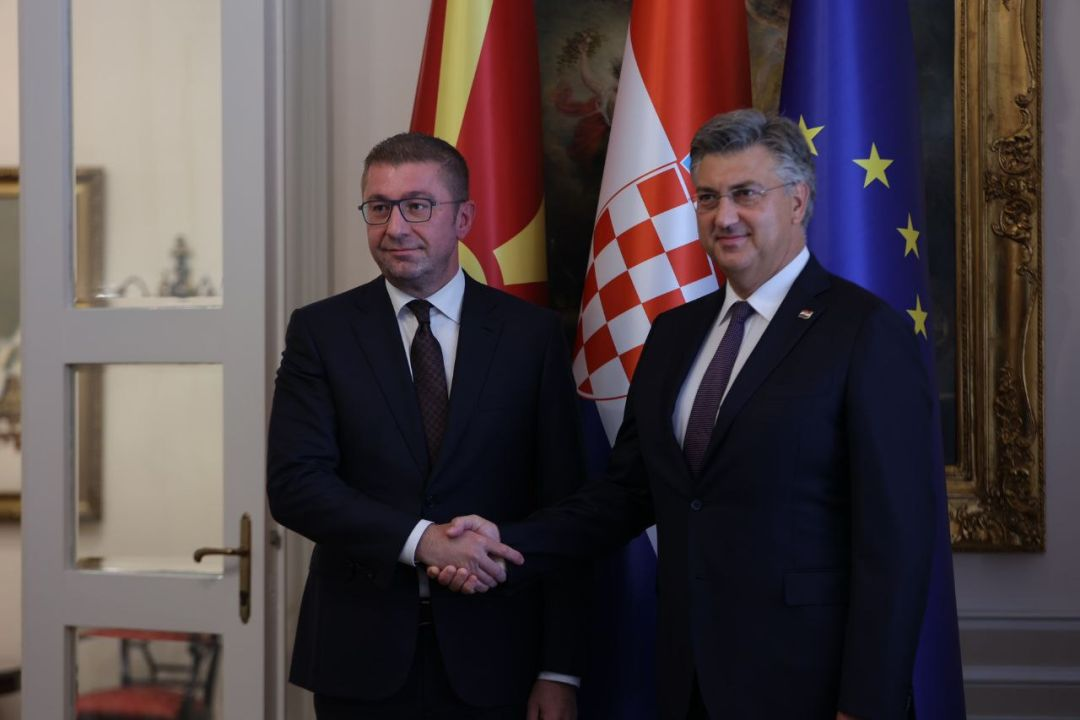
Mickoski with Croatian Prime Minister Andrej Plenković in Zagreb, 29 August 2024

After the VMRO-DPMNE gained a plurality of seats in the Assembly of North Macedonia and entered into a coalition agreement with the VLEN Coalition and ZNAM following the 2024 North Macedonian parliamentary election, Mickoski was given the mandate from the president Gordana Siljanovska-Davkova to form the next government on 6 June. In his address on 23 June 2024, before the vote for the new government in the Assembly, he promised that his government would work to reduce taxes, increase pensions, start a project with over 200 million euros for municipal projects, invest one billion euros for the economy, initiate new foreign investments for new jobs, make textbooks free for all, fight against corruption, and fight for growth of up to 5 percent of the economy. After the vote, he became the country's 13th Prime Minister.

After he referred to his country as "Macedonia" shortly before his election and described the constitutional name North Macedonia as "shameful", Greece accused the country of reneging on the Prespa Agreement and warned that its accession into the European Union was at risk of being blocked. Mickoski promised in his speech also that as long as he is prime minister, the Bulgarian minority will not be recognized and there will be no more constitutional changes, describing this EU requirement as Bulgarian dictate. On this occasion, the Bulgarian side warned that North Macedonia's intention not to abide to its international commitments is unacceptable and this is incompatible with the country's European path.

Mickoski has chosen close party allies and partners as ministers, reserving fewer posts for ethnic Albanians, and selecting one vice PM with well-known links to Russia and Serbia: Ivan Stoilković. It includes also all four VMRO-DPMNE vice presidents, most of whom held high positions under the autocratic regime of the former PM and party leader Nikola Gruevski. The government consists mainly of VMRO-DPMNE, VLEN, ZNAM and the Democratic Party of Serbs in Macedonia members.

In September 2024, Mickoski replaced most of the experts, members of the joint commission with Bulgaria, established under the Treaty of Friendship between the two countries, working to seek a consensus in common reading of history of both countries and peoples. He accused them of neglecting the Macedonian national interests.

==== Geopolitical orientation ====
In July 2024, Mickoski met with his Hungarian colleague Viktor Orban during the NATO summit in Washington. He informed that they have concluded an economic agreement to establish a special economic cooperation between the countries. The idea is for Hungary to provide a large financial credit to North Macedonia. The agreement was condemned by the opposition party SDSM. In this way, Orbán saw an opportunity to increase Hungarian influence in the region. Per Bulgarian historians, Orbán's position in the European Union is complicated and it is important for the landlocked Hungary to retain Budapest–Belgrade–Skopje–Athens railway, which gives it access to the Mediterranean and Chinese production.

Simultaneously, Mickoski argued that the construction of Pan-European Corridor VIII was unfeasible. This project secures a direct railway connection between North Macedonia, Albania and Bulgaria. The railway has been under construction for over 30 years, but without much success. He suggested reallocating the European funds to modernize the existing Budapest–Belgrade–Skopje–Athens railway, part from the China-CEE hallmark initiative instead, which links North Macedonia with Hungary, Serbia and Greece. Mickoski's claims on the impracticability of the project were rejected by the managements of the Macedonian and Bulgarian railways. Moreover, North Macedonia signed a memorandum on the construction of Corridor VIII during the NATO 2024 Washington summit, where Mickoski was present. Nevertheless, Mickoski's office stated that his government was freezing the construction of Corridor VIII. Some analysts suppose that in this way Mickoski was included in the building of a new nationalist axis between Skopje, Belgrade and Budapest that would defend Moscow's interests on the Balkans. Others see in this also an intervention of Beijing, which seeks to consolidate the transport corridor from Greece to Hungary as part of his European expansion. In practice, the financial credit granted to North Macedonia by Hungary was secured by China.

Some observers in North Macedonia claim too that Mickoski who is following in the footsteps of Orban and Serbian President Aleksandar Vučić, is sympathizing also with Trump's policies and that all could be harmful to his country. Former leading members of VMRO-DPMNE as Ljubčo Georgievski and Filip Petrovski accused Mickoski of serbianising North Macedonia. Analysts in Bulgaria assume that he is actually a politician with a pronounced anti-Bulgarian orientation.

On 20 September 2024, Mickoski declared in Brussels that his country will no longer accept any ultimatums on its EU path. On 25 September, the EU announced the decoupling of Albania from North Macedonia on the EU accession path, due to the disputes between North Macedonia and Bulgaria around the Bulgarian minority there, which had stalled further talks. Following this decision, Albania continued its path separately on 15 October. Some observers believe that his rule could turn North Macedonia into a "black hole in the Balkans".

== Personal life and views ==
Mickoski is married and has two children. Apart from his native language Macedonian, he also knows English and some Italian.

Shortly after his assumption of office, the results of the 2023 Albanian census were published, from which it appeared that there are a little more than 7,000 Bulgarians and around 2,000 Macedonians. Mickoski stated on that occasion, that this was the result of Bulgarian propaganda and assimilationist policy there, as well as of the carelessness of the previous government. On the case about the significant number of Macedonians with Bulgarian passports, Mickoski claimed that the situation was based on Bulgaria's accession to the European Union, and all Macedonians will tear up their Bulgarian passports after North Macedonia is accepted into the EU. He maintained that only several hundreds citizens of North Macedonia identify as Bulgarians, while the small Macedonian minority in Bulgaria consists of tens of thousands of people. On 28 May 2025, Mickoski urged the European Parliament to adopt the Report on the annual progress of the country, insisting it must acknowledge Macedonian identity and Macedonian language as centuries-old. He also accused Bulgaria of attempting to present both of them as recent, artificial constructs, resting on Bulgarian foundations. However, the European Parliament did not accept these ideas. As a result Mickoski accused Bulgaria of aiming to destroy Macedonian nation and identity. Several of Mickoski’s close relatives conduct business in Bulgaria and hold Bulgarian citizenship.

== See also ==
- List of current heads of state and government
- List of heads of the executive by approval rating
