= Alternative (North Macedonia) =

Alternative Alternativa
- Abbreviation: AAA
- Leader: Zeqirija Ibrahimi
- General Secretary: Bekim Sali
- Founder: Afrim Gashi
- Founded: 10 March 2019
- Dissolved: 9 May 2026
- Split from: Besa Movement
- Merged into: VLEN
- Ideology: Albanian minority interests
- Political position: Centre-right
- Colours: Black; Orange
- Assembly: 3 / 120
- Mayors: 2 / 81
- Local councils: 0 / 1,333
- Skopje city council: 2 / 45

Website
- alternativa.org.mk

Alternative (Macedonian: Алтернатива, AAA; Albanian: Alternativa) is a political party in North Macedonia representing the Albanian minority.

== History ==
The party was formed on March 10, 2019. Afrim Gashi was elected president of the party.

In the 2020 parliamentary election, the party ran in a coalition with the Alliance for Albanians.
