= The Left (North Macedonia) =

Political party in North Macedonia

The Left Левица Levica
- President: Dimitar Apasiev
- Founded: November 2015; 10 years ago
- Headquarters: Skopje
- Youth wing: Red Youth
- Women's wing: Anti-fascist Women's Front
- Ideology: Socialism; Anti-capitalism; Anti-neoliberalism; Left-wing nationalism; Euroscepticism
- Political position: Far-left
- International affiliation: World Anti-Imperialist Platform; Sovintern
- Assembly: 6 / 120
- Local councils: 66 / 1,333
- Skopje city council: 6 / 45

Website
- levica.mk

The Left (Macedonian: Левица, romanized: Levica) is a far-left, nationalist and eurosceptic political party in North Macedonia. Led by Dimitar Apasiev, a professor of law at the Goce Delčev University of Štip, the party is anti-NATO and promotes anti-clericalism, anti-fascism, anti-imperialism, and socialism. They have a youth wing called Red Youth (Macedonian: Црвена Младина).

== Foundation and ideology ==
The Left was founded in November 2015. It was formed by three principal movements: the Communist Party of Macedonia, the movement Solidarity, and the Movement for Social Justice "Lenka", which its parliamentary leader Dimitar Apasiev belongs to. The party was founded during the Macedonian political crisis and before the so-called Colorful Revolution. It defines itself as a party advocating labour rights and social justice, while opposing "inter-ethnic barriers" and ethnic nationalism. Anti-imperialism, democratic socialism, leftist patriotism, anti-clericalism, and military neutrality are among the party's founding principles. Internally, the party has declared its intention to structure itself along the lines of democratic centralism. As a radical left party, it has been proud of its anti-fascism and nurtures the traditions of Yugoslav socialism. The party has local branches in 21 cities and municipalities. In February 2019, most of the party's founders were expelled, allowing Dimitar Apasiev to get elected as the party's president. The party and its leader Apasiev have been described by some journalists and party's founders as "fascist". However, per political scientist Ivo Bosilkov, this is a "gross misconception" since the party's ideology is still largely far-left.

=== Nationalism and minority rights ===
The Left has spoken out against Albanian nationalism in North Macedonia and has opposed the expansion of the Albanian language into North Macedonia's judicial system, dubbing it "an expansionist blast of Albanian nationalism" in favour of the Albanian Democratic Union for Integration, which it considers a "criminal party". The party deemed the law as only increasing the ethnic rift in North Macedonia, claiming that it undermines the civic nature of the state. It has come out against what it dubbed a division into Macedonian and Albanian blocs in the country. It denounced the Ohrid Framework Agreement, which gave more rights to Albanians in North Macedonia.

Balkan Insight has accused The Left of borrowing policies from the far right. In September 2020, the party's leader Apasiev testified at the Public Prosecutor's Office in Skopje after receiving three criminal charges for spreading racial, religious, and ethnic intolerance. Per political scientist Ivo Bosilkov, "Levica can be classified as a valenced/polyvalent populist party, and if it exhibits any tendency according to the ideological-populist spectrum, it is skewed towards populism of a right-wing nature."

=== Foreign policy ===
The Left has vehemently opposed the Prespa agreement and the renaming of the Republic of Macedonia into the Republic of North Macedonia. It has also dismissed the renaming of the country as unconstitutional, and as such should be revoked. It has declared its intention to void the agreement, should it come into power in North Macedonia. It has also announced that it would only take part in a coalition government if that government would renounce the Prespa agreement. The party's main reason for opposing the name change is its feeling that the deal is only intended to bring the country closer to NATO's influence, which they see as an imperialist organisation, as well as saying the deal completely absolves Greece of any past actions against Macedonians. The party has continued using the former constitutional name, Republic of Macedonia.

The Left is accused of being "anti-western". The party opposes NATO, referring to it as a terrorist organisation, which they accuse of starting imperialist wars and of being a threat to world peace. On this basis, it has called for the suspension of accession of North Macedonia to NATO. It has dubbed North Macedonia's foreign minister Nikola Dimitrov's recognition of Juan Guaidó as the interim President of Venezuela as a "typical stance of a vassalistic and subordinate country that has completely lost its sovereignty as an independent state". The party has supported Nicolás Maduro as President of Venezuela, as it considers him democratically elected.

The Left supports for North Macedonia to become a neutral country and a "principle of zero problems with neighbouring countries". The latter it defines as "solving problems without bringing historical baggage", friendly relations with Balkans countries and a principle of self-determination, which they opine gives all people the right to define their own name themselves. The party's leader has stated in an interview that North Macedonia's membership in the European Union might potentially be a positive thing, but that the country should stay out if the cost of membership was a change in its name and identity. In 2020, the party put forward the idea that North Macedonia should withdraw the recognitions of Israel, Kosovo, and South Korea, instead recognising Palestine, Catalonia, and the Basque Country. They also suggested a review of the Friendship Agreement between Bulgaria and North Macedonia, as they consider parts of it to amount to historical revisionism and a "rehabilitation of fascism".

The party supports Russia's war in Ukraine, repeating Russian propaganda, thus opposing the sanctions imposed against Russia. Civil activists and political parties in North Macedonia condemned Levica for aligning with Russia. According to the news site Meta.mk and the fact-checking service Truthmeter, a significant amount of the public in North Macedonia perceives the party as pro-Russian. It also espouses ultra-nationalist rhetoric about Macedonian-Albanian and Macedonian-Bulgarian relations. Levica is Eurosceptic, claiming that North Macedonia should consider an alternative to the EU, such as the Eurasian pact and the BRICS, implying that Russia is the other alternative to the EU. During the 2024 electoral campaign, the party and its presidential candidate Biljana Vankovska promoted cooperation with China, leaving NATO and EU integrations and seeking other alternatives.

=== Social and environmental issues ===
The Left opposed the government of Zoran Zaev and his Social Democratic Union of Macedonia (SDSM), accusing them of being involved in crime. It also opposed the previous government of Nikola Gruevski, whom they consider an "autocrat", as well as his VMRO-DPMNE.

The party celebrates and organises rallies for the Victory Day of the Soviet Union over fascism on 9 May, being the only Macedonian political party to organise events for the non-official holiday.

The Left has described North Macedonia as undergoing an "ecological cataclysm", which they consider a direct result of the "political and social catastrophe that is happening to all spheres of daily life". Its electoral program declares support for free healthcare and universal education, and considers neoliberalism and "wild capitalism" to be the root of most of North Macedonia's economic problems.

== Electoral performance ==
Assembly of North Macedonia
Year	Popular vote	% of popular vote	Overall seats won	Seat change	Government
2016	12,120	1.05%	0 / 120	New	No seats
2020	37,426	4.13%	2 / 120	▲2	Opposition
2024	68,637	7.01%	6 / 120	▲4	Opposition

Municipalities of North Macedonia
Year	Councillorships won	Mayoralties won	Councillorship change	Mayoralty change
2017	3	0	New	New
2021	49	0	▲46	
2025	66	0	▲17	

Before the 2025 local elections in North Macedonia, the party was the only one that was not allowed to advertise with either public or partisan money by the Agency for Audio and Audiovisual Media Services. The party appealed against this decision before the Constitutional Court, which rejected the party's initiative and declared itself incompetent. Regardless, the Levica candidate Amar Mecinović managed to enter the second round of the Skopje mayoral election, in which he won over 60 thousand votes, managing to perform better than SDSM.
