= Jovan Mitreski =

Macedonian politician and economist

- Јован Митрески
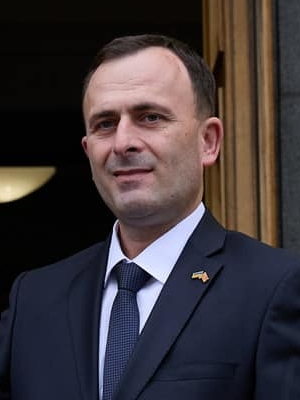
- Mitreski in 2024

President of the Assembly of the Republic of North Macedonia
- In office 26 January 2024 – 28 May 2024
- Preceded by: Talat Xhaferi
- Succeeded by: Afrim Gashi

Personal details
- Born: 20 November 1980 (age 45) Struga, SR Macedonia, SFR Yugoslavia (now North Macedonia)
- Party: Social Democratic Union of Macedonia
- Education: St. Clement of Ohrid University of Bitola

Jovan Mitreski (Macedonian: Јован Митрески; born 20 November 1980) is a Macedonian politician and economist. He served as the President of the Assembly of North Macedonia from January to May 2024.

A member of the Social Democratic Union of Macedonia, Mitreski was consecutively elected Member of Parliament in the 2014, 2016 and 2020 parliamentary elections. In his second and third term, he was the coordinator of the parliamentary group of the coalition led by SDSM.

Mitreski was elected as President of the Assembly on 26 January 2024, at 64 'yes' votes to 40 'no' votes, succeeding Talat Xhaferi.
