= Talat Xhaferi =

Macedonian politician (born 1962)

- Талат Џафери
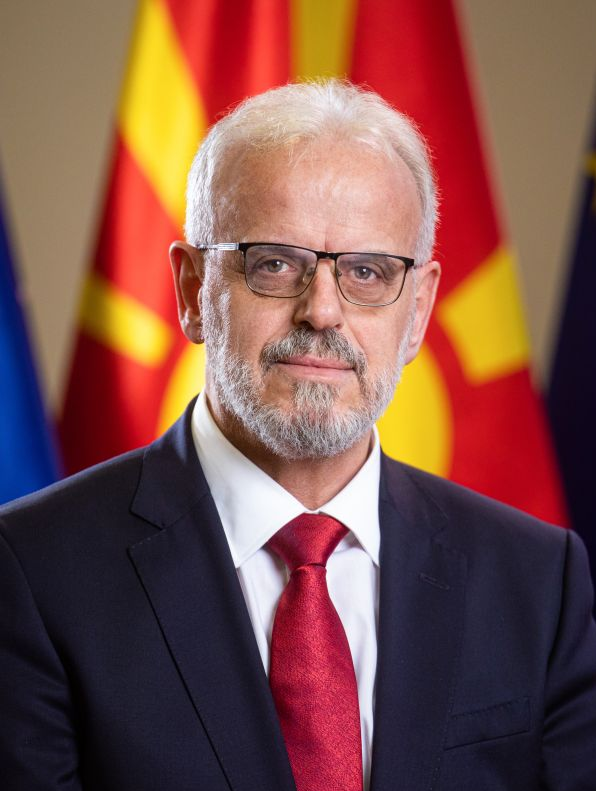
- Official portrait, 2024

Prime Minister of North Macedonia (Technical)
- In office 28 January 2024 – 23 June 2024
- President: Stevo Pendarovski; Gordana Siljanovska-Davkova
- Preceded by: Dimitar Kovačevski
- Succeeded by: Hristijan Mickoski

President of the Assembly of the Republic of North Macedonia
- In office 27 April 2017 – 25 January 2024
- Prime Minister: Emil Dimitriev (acting); Zoran Zaev; Oliver Spasovski; Zoran Zaev; Dimitar Kovačevski
- Preceded by: Trajko Veljanovski
- Succeeded by: Jovan Mitreski

Minister of Defense
- In office 18 February 2013 – 19 June 2014
- Prime Minister: Nikola Gruevski
- Preceded by: Fatmir Besimi
- Succeeded by: Zoran Jolevski

Personal details
- Born: Talat Xhaferi; 15 April 1962 (age 64) Forino, PR Macedonia, Yugoslavia (now North Macedonia)
- Party: Democratic Union for Integration
- Spouse: Mereme
- Education: Belgrade Military Academy
- Occupation: Politician

Military service
- Allegiance: Yugoslavia; Macedonia; National Liberation Army
- Branch/service: Yugoslav People's Army; Army of Macedonia; National Liberation Army
- Years of service: 1985–2001
- Battles/wars: 2001 insurgency in Macedonia

Talat Xhaferi (Macedonian: Талат Џафери; born 15 April 1962) is a Macedonian politician who served as Prime Minister of North Macedonia from January to June 2024. He previously served as the President of the Assembly of the Republic of North Macedonia from 2017 to 2024 and as Minister of Defense from 2013 to 2014. He was the first ethnic Albanian to have served as prime minister since the independence and statehood of North Macedonia.

== Early life and military career ==
Xhaferi, an ethnic Albanian, was born on 15 April 1962 in the village of Forino near Gostivar, PR Macedonia, FPR Yugoslavia. He attended primary school in the nearby village of Čegrane and continued his secondary education at the Military High School in Belgrade. He studied at the Military Academy of the Land Army Infantry of the Yugoslav People's Army (JNA) in Belgrade and Sarajevo. Later in his career he specialized in command and staff duties at the General Mihailo Apostolski Military Academy in Skopje. In 2013, he obtained a master's degree in defense.

From 1985 to 1991, Xhaferi was a JNA officer, and from 1992 to 2001 an officer of the Army of the Republic of Macedonia (ARM).

=== 2001 insurgency ===
During the 2001 insurgency, in which ethnic Albanian militants attacked security forces, Xhaferi was at first a senior officer in the ARM, commanding troops in the Tetovo barracks.

On 28 April, the day of the Vejce massacre, he was on duty as commander at the barracks. Several days later he deserted and joined the National Liberation Army (NLA), an Albanian guerrilla group fighting against the Republic of Macedonia, and became its commander of the 116th Brigade, earning the pseudonym Komandant Forina after his birthplace. He was later amnestied, in accordance with the 2001 Ohrid Agreement.

== Political career ==
Xhaferi was first elected to the Macedonian parliament in 2002 for the Democratic Union for Integration (DUI), which was formed that year by members of the dissolved NLA. From 2004 to 2006 Xhaferi was Deputy Minister of Defence. From 2008 to 2013, he was a member of parliament from DUI, allied with the conservative VMRO-DPMNE party. In 2012, he became known for his marathon speeches used as a filibuster tactic to blocking the adoption of a law on veterans that would have granted benefits to Macedonian war veterans. He blocked the draft at commission level by "reading poetry, citing foreign literature and reports on Macedonia, mumbling or simply remaining silent, waiting for the time to pass".

In 2013, Xhaferi was nominated by DUI for Minister of Defense in the Cabinet of Nikola Gruevski, after the resignation of Fatmir Besimi. The appointment of Xhaferi triggered protests by Macedonian (in particular retired general Stojanče Angelov of the pro-veteran Dignity opposition party) and Albanian citizens. Xhaferi stated that his goal was to make the armed forces “a symbol of coexistence, tolerance and respect for differences”.

On 26 November 2019, an earthquake struck Albania. Xhaferi was part of a delegation of ethnically Albanian politicians from North Macedonia visiting the earthquake epicenter that expressed their condolences to Albanian president Ilir Meta.

=== President of the Assembly ===
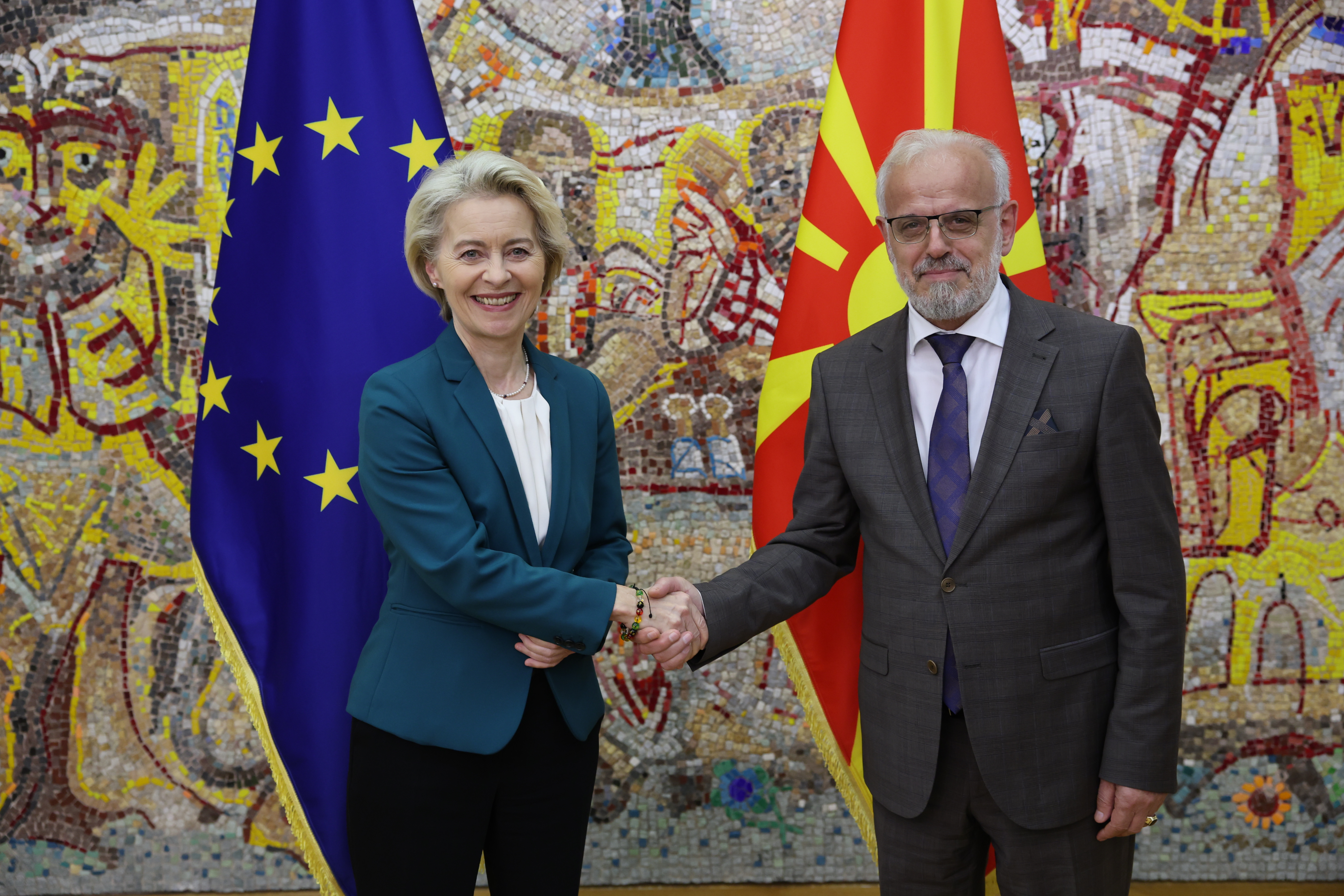
Xhaferi meets with President of the European Commission Ursula von der Leyen in Skopje, 29 October 2023

In April 2017, Xhaferi was elected President of the Macedonian parliament, supported by a coalition of Albanian national parties and the opposition social-democratic SDSM party, sparking riots in the parliament building. The VMRO-DPMNE party labeled this move as a coup. Subsequently, demonstrators broke into the parliament building, beating journalists and MPs, and had to be cleared by the police.

=== Premiership ===
On 25 January 2024, Xhaferi resigned following the resignations of the government of Dimitar Kovačevski, in preparation to be elected as the president of a technical government which, in accordance with the Pržino Agreement, led the country in the 100 days prior to the parliamentary elections on 8 May. He was succeeded by Hristijan Mickoski on 24 June.

Political offices
Preceded by Dimitar Kovačevski	Prime Minister of North Macedonia; 2024	Succeeded by Hristijan Mickoski
