= Besa Movement =

Albanian minority political party in North Macedonia

Besa Movement Lëvizja Besa
- Leader: Bilall Kasami
- Founded: November 2014
- Dissolved: 9 May 2026
- Merged into: VLEN
- Headquarters: Skopje
- Ideology: Albanian minority interests
- Political position: Centre-right
- Colours: White, Red, Black
- Assembly: 3 / 120
- Mayors: 3 / 81
- Local councils: 36 / 1,333
- Skopje city council: 0 / 45

Party flag
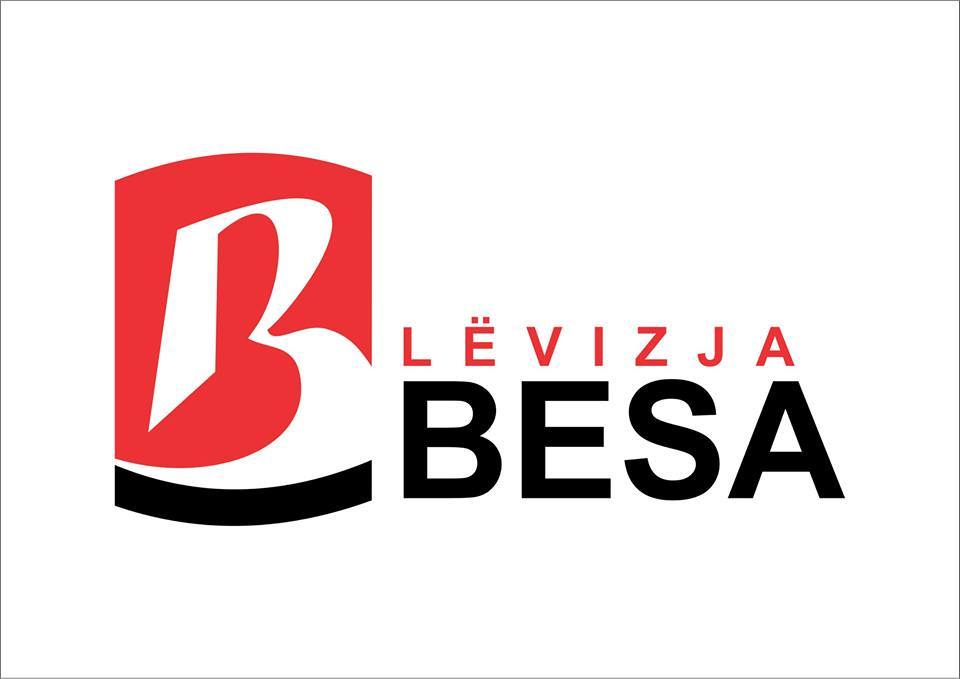

Website
- www.levizjabesa.mk

The Besa Movement (Albanian: Lëvizja Besa; Macedonian: Движење Беса, romanized: Dviženje Besa) is a centre-right ethnic Albanian political party in North Macedonia. It was formed in November 2014 by Bilal Kasami, Afrim Gashi and Adnan Azizi.
