= Trajko Veljanovski =

Former president of Macedonian Parliament

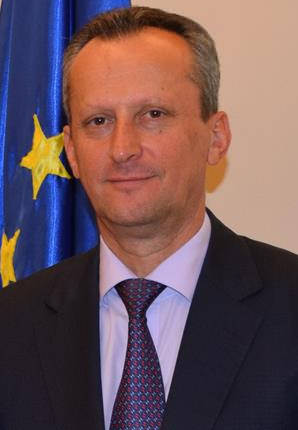
Trajko Veljanovski in 2015

Trajko Veljanovski (born 2 November 1962) is a Macedonian politician who was the President of the Assembly of North Macedonia from 2008 to 2017. He was graduated from Ss. Cyril and Methodius University working as a lawyer until 1999.

== Politics ==
He started in politics in 1993 by joining VMRO-DPMNE. He was elected Under-Secretary in the Ministry of Justice in the Macedonian Parliament in 1999, then became Deputy Minister in the same ministry.

In the 2006 elections he was elected Member of the Assembly. In the 2008 elections he was re-elected and became the Speaker of the Macedonian parliament.

== Arrest and conviction for the Macedonian Parliament storming ==
On 2019, Veljanoski was arrested and questioned for his role in the 2017 storming of Macedonian Parliament. Two years later, he was convicted as an organizer of the storming and sentenced to over 6 years in prison. In 2025, a court in Skopje ordered Veljanovski's release, citing a 2018 amnesty law.
