= VLEN Coalition =

2024 Albanian coalition in North Macedonia

VLEN Coalition Koalicioni Vlen Коалиција Влен
- Leader: Bilal Kasami; Izet Mexhiti
- Founded: 2024 (alliance); 9 May 2026 (political party)
- Youth wing: Forumi Rinor i Koalicionit VLEN
- Ideology: Albanian minority interests
- Political position: Centre-right
- Colors: Maroon
- Assembly: 11 / 120
- Mayors: 10 / 81
- Local councils (Note: Also with coalitions.): 131 / 1,345
- Skopje city council: 6 / 45

Website
- vlen.eu

The Vlen Coalition (Albanian: Koalicioni Vlen; Macedonian: Коалиција Влен) is a centre-right ethnic Albanian political party in North Macedonia, formerly a political alliance, representing the Albanian minority.

== Member parties ==
The member parties for the 2024 parliamentary elections until today are:

Abbr.	Name	Leader	Seats	Joined
BESA	Besa Movement; Lëvizja Besa	Bilall Kasami	3 / 120	2024
AAA	Alternative; Alternativa	Zeqirija Ibrahimi	3 / 120	2024
LD	Democratic Movement; Lëvizja Demokratike	Izet Mexhiti	3 / 120	2024
LVV	Vetëvendosje	Bekim Qoku	1 / 120	2024
ASH	Alliance for Albanians-Fetaj; Aleanca për Shqiptarët	Arben Fetaj	1 / 120	2025

=== Former members ===
Abbr.	Name	Leader	Seats	Period
ASH	Alliance for Albanians-Taravari; Aleanca për Shqiptarët	Arben Taravari	3 / 120	2024–2025

== Election results ==
=== Assembly elections ===
Election	Votes	%	Seats	+/–	Rank	Government
2024	106,946	10.92	14 / 120	Steady	4th	Coalition
