= Savo Klimovski =

Macedonian lawyer and politician

- Саво Климовски
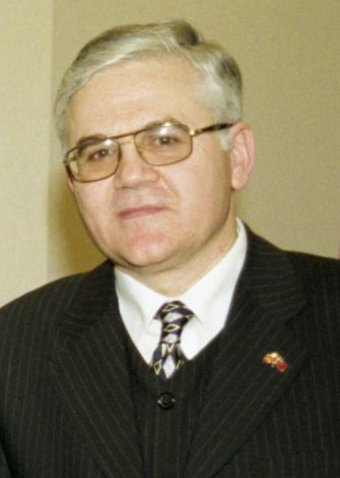
- Tlimovski in 1999

President of Macedonia
- In office 19 November 1999 – 15 December 1999
- Preceded by: Kiro Gligorov
- Succeeded by: Boris Trajkovski

Personal details
- Born: 13 June 1947 (age 78) Skopje, PR Macedonia, FPR Yugoslavia
- Citizenship: Macedonian

Savo Klimovski (Macedonian: Саво Климовски; born 13 June 1947, Skopje) is a Macedonian lawyer and politician. He served as interim President of Macedonia from 19 November to 15 December 1999. He studied law at Ss. Cyril and Methodius University of Skopje, where he became a dean in 1992. From 1986 to 1991 he was Minister of Education and from 1994 to 2000 had been elected to Parliament from Democratic Alternative list. From 1998 to 2000 Klimovski served as Speaker of the Assembly. As such he was interim President in the end of 1999, when the results of presidential elections were questioned.
