= Assembly of North Macedonia =

Unicameral legislature of North Macedonia

Coordinates: 41°59′33.7″N 21°25′56.9″E

Assembly of the Republic of North Macedonia Собрание / Kuvendi
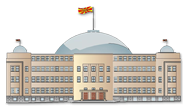

Type
- Type: Unicameral
- Established: 1990 (Note: Former structure established in 1945)

Leadership
- President: Afrim Gashi, VLEN since 28 May 2024

Structure
- Seats: 120
- Political groups: Government (Current Cabinet) (74): Your Macedonia (58) (Note: VMRO-DPMNE (55); SPM (2); DPSM (1)); VLEN (11); ZNAM (5); Opposition (46): For a European Future (18) (Note: SDSM (15); NSDP (2); LDP (1)); European Front (11) (Note: BDI (9); LP (1); THDH (1)); LEVICA (6); LSh (3); ASh (3); PDSh (1); TDP (1); Independents (2)

Elections
- Voting system: Proportional representation (D'Hondt method)
- First election: 11 and 25 November 1990
- Last election: 8 May 2024
- Next election: 2028

Meeting place
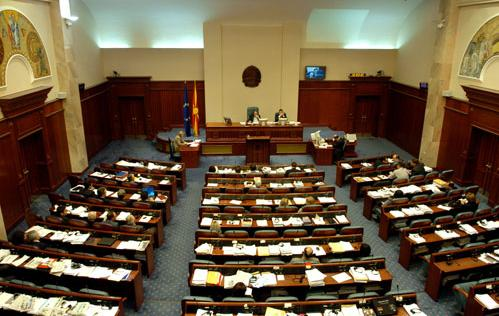
- Sobranie Palace

Website
- sobranie.mk

The Assembly of the Republic of North Macedonia (Note: Macedonian: Собрание на Република Северна Македонија, romanized: Sobranie na Republika Severna Makedonija, Albanian: Kuvendi i Republikës së Maqedonisë së Veriut) is the unicameral legislature of North Macedonia. According to the Constitution, the Sobranie represents the people and is vested with legislative power. It can have between 120 and 140 MPs (currently 120), elected by proportional representation from 6 electoral districts, each contributing 20 MPs, and there are also 3 reserved seats elected from the Macedonian diaspora which are awarded only if the voter turnout was sufficient. MPs are elected for a term of four years and cannot be recalled during their term. The Sobranie is presided over by a President (Speaker). Its organization and functioning are regulated by the Constitution and Rules of Procedure. The Assembly's seat is in the Sobranie Palace in country's capital Skopje.

== History ==
The first constitution of the country was adopted in November 1991, declaring it a parliamentary democracy. According to the constitution, the Assembly represents the citizens and has legislative power. The Assembly is the successor of the Assembly of the Socialist Republic of Macedonia, which was part of the Socialist Federal Republic of Yugoslavia.

On 27 April 2017, protestors stormed the Assembly in an attempt to prevent the election of a new president, the ethnic Albanian Talat Xhaferi, from the Democratic Union for Integration. Due to the inaction of the police, several MPs were injured. In 2018, the MPs passed the Amnesty Law, which granted amnesty to some participants involved in the storming, who were not involved in violence or the organization of the storming. Among those amnestied were MPs from the opposition who later voted in favor for changing the name of the country.

During the COVID-19 pandemic in North Macedonia, In March 2020, an internal protocol for protection against COVID-19 was adopted, based on the recommendations of the Ministry of Health and the World Health Organization. It established a procedure for movement of employees and MPs, a schedule of disinfection of the premises, and placement of automated hand sanitizers. The president of the Assembly proposed the realization of the sessions online in December 2020, but this was not supported by the opposition. As a result, the Assembly had to continue its work in person, while also experiencing a block in its work for months due to the absence of a quorum.

== 2024 election result ==
Party	Votes	%	Seats	+/–
Your Macedonia (Note: Consists of VMRO-DPMNE, SPM, DPSM, DS, PODEM, ROM, Party of Vlachs from Macedonia, VOICE for Macedonia, NLP, SDU, DPR, RZPRM, OPER, Dignity, TMRO, MAAK, United for Macedonia and Macedonian Concept)	436,393	44.58	58	+14
For a European Future (Note: Consists of: SDSM, LDP, NSDP, VMRO-NP, PDT, DOM, POPGM, SSM, DNET, SNSM, BNP, DSR, DSVM, SRM, Party of Democratic Action of Macedonia, Desnica, PDPR and POEN)	154,444	15.78	18	–28
European Front (Note: Consists of BDI, Alliance for Albanians (Sela's - led), PDSH, Democratic European Party, People's Movement, DPT, Movement of Turks for Justice and Democracy, Union of Roma in Macedonia and Bosniak Democratic Union)	137,690	14.06	18	+3
VLEN Coalition (Note: Consists of Democratic Movement, Alternativa, Alliance for Albanians (Taravari's - led) the Besa Movement and others)	106,946	10.92	14	+2
The Left	68,636	7.01	6	+4
For Our Macedonia	56,221	5.74	6	New
Brave for Macedonia (Note: Consists of: Citizen Option for Macedonia, Party for the Full Emancipation of the Roma of Macedonia, Integra-Macedonian Conservative Party)	4,522	0.46	0	–1
New Alternative	3,516	0.36	0	0
Abaja	2,909	0.30	0	New
Your Party	1,794	0.18	0	0
United Macedonia	1,688	0.17	0	New
Homeland Macedonia	1,099	0.11	0	New
Macedonian Era Third – Sovereignists	968	0.10	0	New
Democrats Skopje	913	0.09	0	0
The Right	535	0.05	0	New
Labour Party	452	0.05	0	0
European Civic Movement	241	0.02	0	New
Total	978,967	100.00	120	0
Valid votes	978,967	97.27		
Invalid/blank votes	27,469	2.73		
Total votes	1,006,436	100.00		
Registered voters/turnout	1,815,350	55.44		
Source: SEC

== Presidents of the Assembly (1991–present) ==
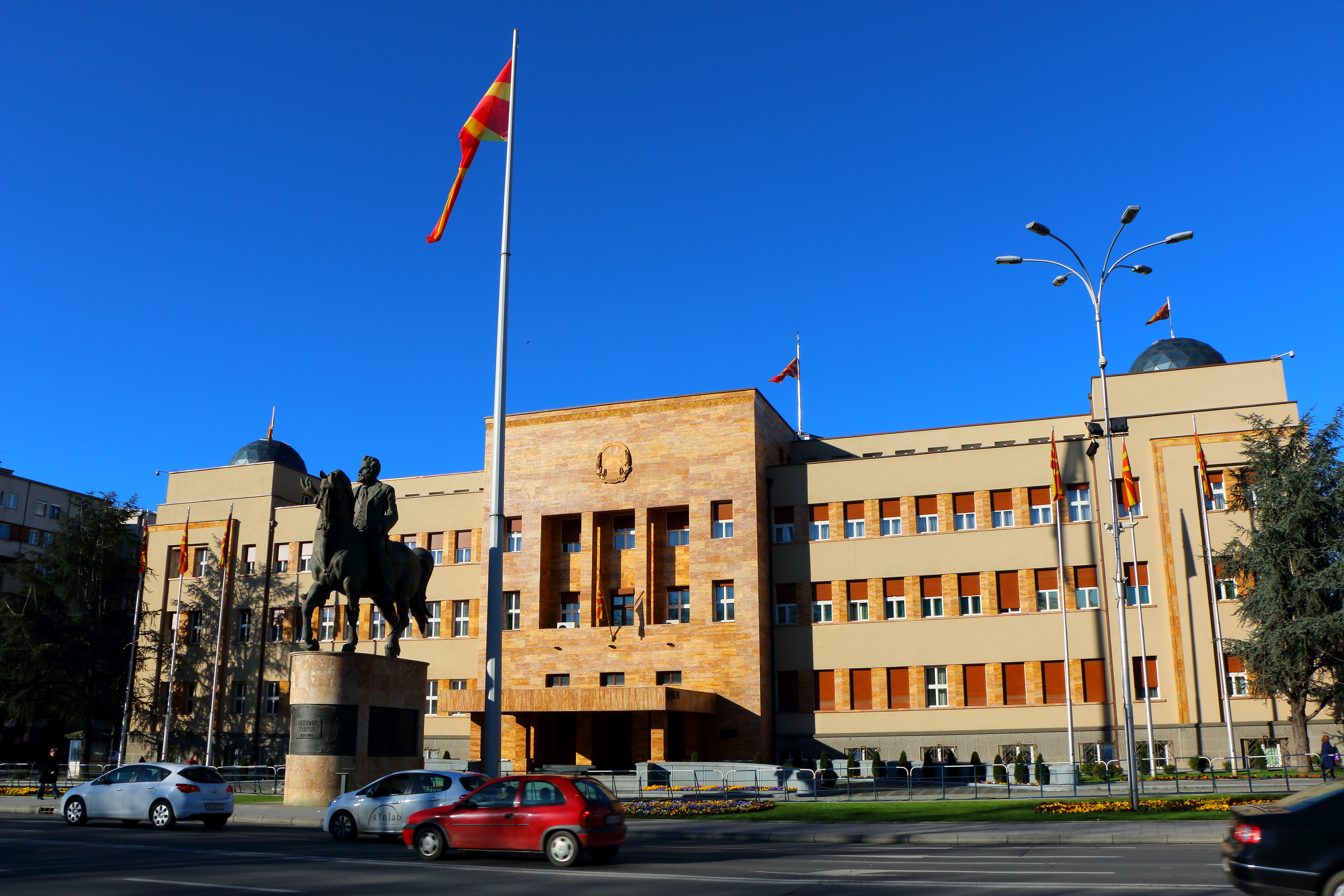
Sobranie Palace

Parties

LPM (1) SDSM (3) DA (1) LDP VMRO–DPMNE (2) DUI (1) Alternativa (1)

Status

Acting President

№	Name (Birth–Death)	Portrait	Term of office		Political Affiliation
1	Stojan Andov (1935–2024)		8 January 1991	6 March 1996	Liberal Party of Macedonia
2	Tito Petkovski (1945–)		6 March 1996	19 November 1998	Social Democratic Union of Macedonia
3	Savo Klimovski (1947–)		19 November 1998	30 November 2000	Democratic Alternative
(1)	Stojan Andov (1935–2024)		30 November 2000	4 October 2002	Liberal Party of Macedonia
4	Nikola Popovski (1962–)		4 October 2002	8 November 2003	Social Democratic Union of Macedonia
—	Liljana Popovska (1956–)		8 November 2003	18 November 2003	Liberal Democratic Party
5	Ljupčo Jordanovski (1953–2010)		18 November 2003	2 August 2006	Social Democratic Union of Macedonia
6	Ljubiša Georgievski (1937–2018)		2 August 2006	21 June 2008	Internal Macedonian Revolutionary Organization – Democratic Party for Macedonian National Unity
7	Trajko Veljanovski (1962–)		21 June 2008	27 April 2017	Internal Macedonian Revolutionary Organization – Democratic Party for Macedonian National Unity
8	Talat Xhaferi (1962–)		27 April 2017	25 January 2024	Democratic Union for Integration
9	Jovan Mitreski (1980–)		26 January 2024	28 May 2024	Social Democratic Union of Macedonia
10	Afrim Gashi (1977–)		28 May 2024	Incumbent	Alternativa

== See also ==
- Anti-fascist Assembly for the National Liberation of Macedonia
- Assembly of the Socialist Republic of Macedonia
