= Sretenovo =

Sretenovo Сретеново
- Village
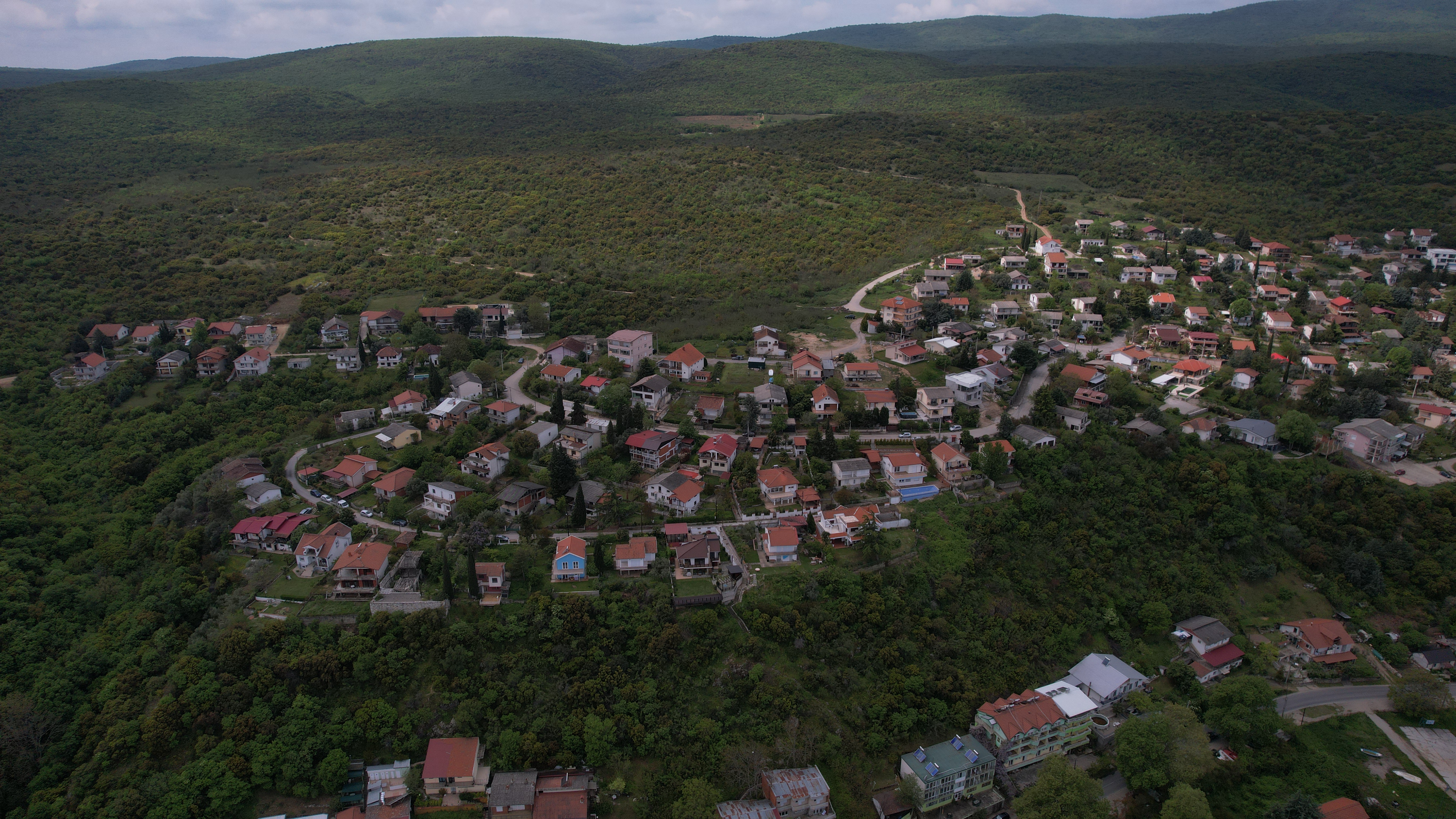
- Air view of the village

- Location within North Macedonia
- Coordinates: 41.174924°N 22.729722°E
- Country: North Macedonia
- Region: Southeastern
- Municipality: Dojran

Population (2021)
  - Total: 344
- Time zone: UTC+1 (CET)
  - Summer (DST): UTC+2 (CEST)
- Website: .

Sretenovo (Macedonian: Сретеново) is a village in the municipality of Dojran, North Macedonia. It is located on the south shores of Doiran Lake, near the Greek border.

== Demographics ==
As of the 2021 census, Sretenovo had 344 residents with the following ethnic composition:

- Macedonians 246
- Serbs 43
- Roma 19
- Others 13
- Albanians 10
- Turks 8
- Persons for whom data are taken from administrative sources 5

According to the 2002 census, the village had a total of 315 inhabitants. Ethnic groups in the village include:

- Macedonians 205
- Turks 11
- Serbs 54
- Romani 36
- Aromanians 1
- Others 8
