= Selemli =

Selemli Селемли
- Village
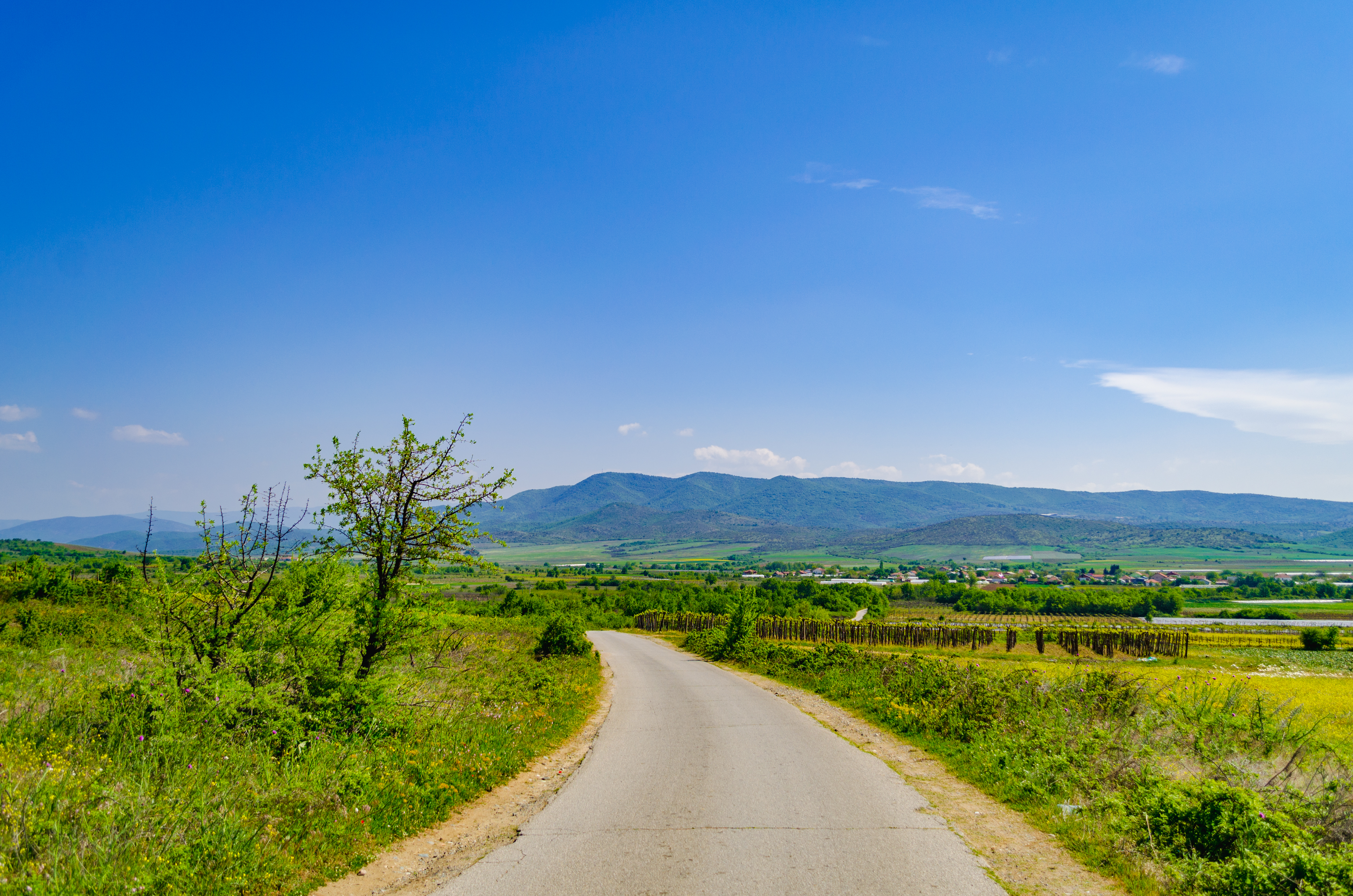
- Panoramic view of the village Selemli

- Location within North Macedonia
- Country: North Macedonia
- Region: Southeastern
- Municipality: Bogdanci

Population (2021)
  - Total: 255
- Time zone: UTC+1 (CET)
  - Summer (DST): UTC+2 (CEST)
- Website: .

Selemli (Macedonian: Селемли, Serbian: Селемлија/Selemlija) is a village in the municipality of Bogdanci, North Macedonia at the border with Greece. The village was formerly inhabited by Turks, who left the village during World War I, and it was repopulated with Serbs from Vranje, whose descendants are now the majority. It is the southernmost settlement in the world with an ethnic Serb majority.

== Geography ==
The settlement is located in the area of Bojmija, in the southeastern part of the territory of the Municipality of Bogdanci, whose area touches the state border with Greece and has a crossing. The village is flat, located at an altitude of 150 meters. It is 11 km away from the town of Gevgelija. Selemli is located south from the village of Stojakovo, with which it is connected by an asphalt road.

The area covers 6 km^{2}. It is dominated by arable land on an area of 390 hectares, pastures account for 160 hectares, and forests only 4 hectares.

In the southern part of the village there is the small artificial lake Selemlija, built in the 1970s to irrigate the vineyards.

== Economy ==
The village has an agricultural function.

The population of Selemli is mainly engaged in the cultivation of agricultural products (mostly early vegetables) primarily due to the favorable warm climate and strong Mediterranean influences that penetrate into this region. The cultivation of vines from which quality wine and rakija are produced is also present.

== Demographics ==
According to the statistics of the Bulgarian ethnographer Vasil Kanchov from 1900, the village of Selemli had 250 inhabitants, all Turks.

With the growth of the population, the village went from a small to a medium-sized village. Thus, in 1961, Selemli had 287 inhabitants, and in 1994 the number increased to 342 inhabitants, consisting of 311 Serbs and 31 Macedonians.

As of the 2021 census, Selemli had 255 residents with the following ethnic composition:

- Serbs 191
- Macedonians 43
- Persons for whom data are taken from administrative sources 20
- Others 1

According to the 2002 census, the village had a total of 327 inhabitants. Ethnic groups in the village include:

- Serbs 292
- Macedonians 35
