= Ǵavato, Bogdanci =

Ǵavato Ѓавато
- Village
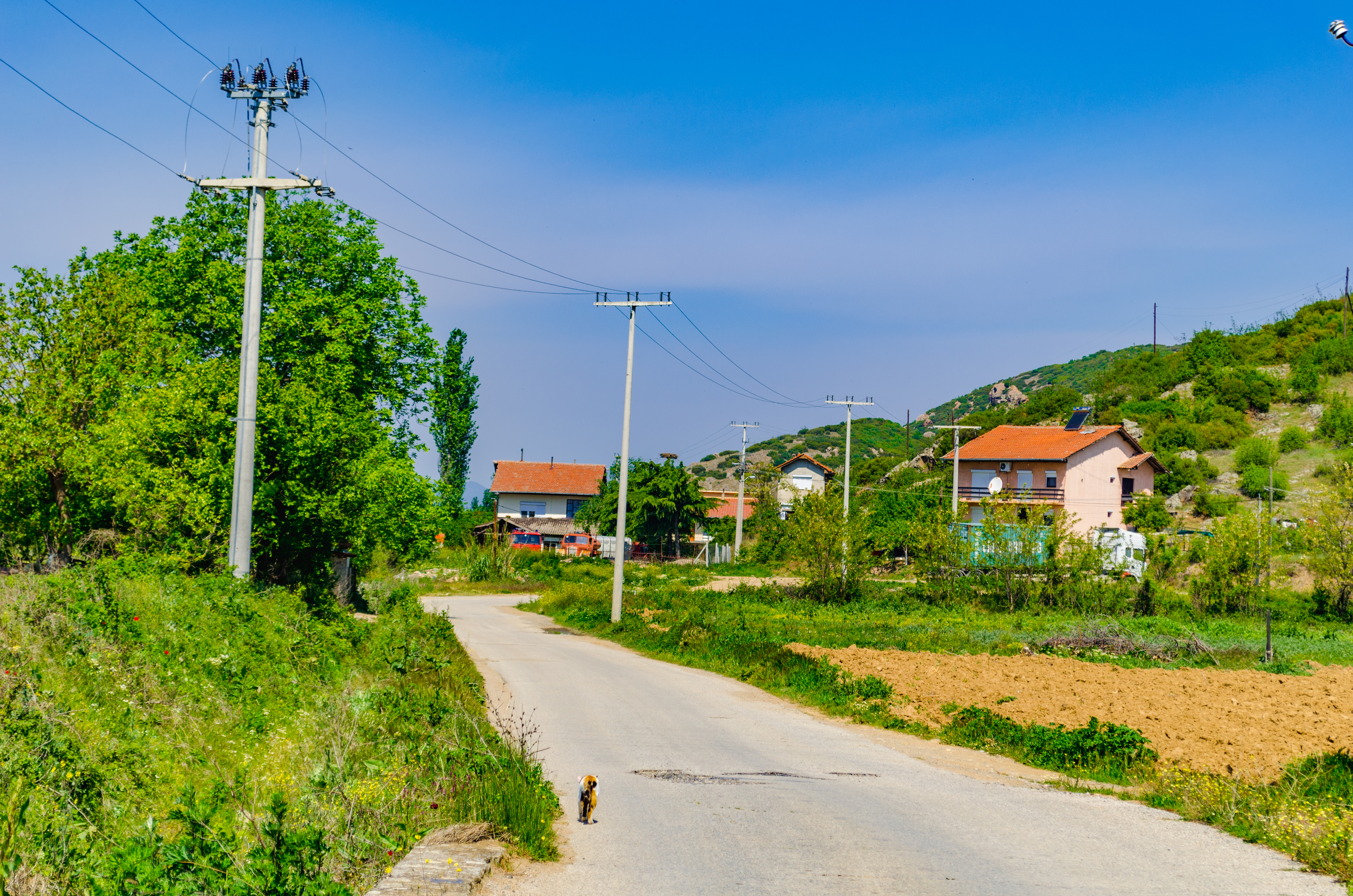

- Location within North Macedonia
- Coordinates: 41.193545°N 22.536570°E
- Country: North Macedonia
- Region: Southeastern
- Municipality: Bogdanci

Population (2002)
  - Total: 438
- Time zone: UTC+1 (CET)
  - Summer (DST): UTC+2 (CEST)
- Website: .

Ǵavato (Macedonian: Ѓавато) is a village in the municipality of Bogdanci, North Macedonia at the border with Greece.

== Demographics ==
According to the 2002 census, the village had a total of 438 inhabitants. Ethnic groups in the village include:

- Macedonians 407
- Serbs 21
- Turks 4
- Other 4

As of 2021, the village of Gjavato has 389 inhabitants and the ethnic composition was the following:

- Macedonians – 350
- Serbs – 14
- others – 8
- Person without Data - 9
