= Brajkovci =

Brajkovci Брајковци
- Village
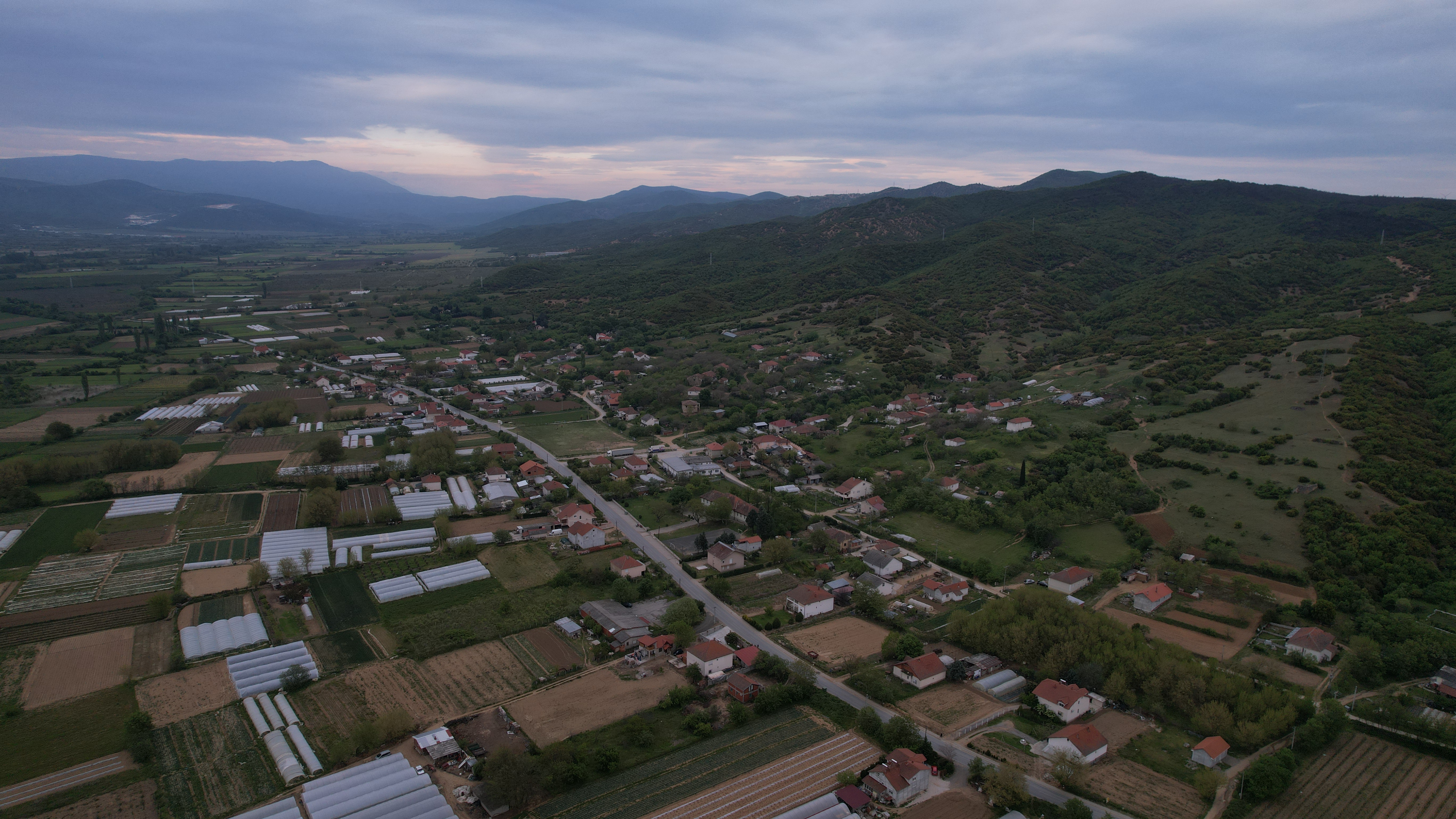
- Airview of the village

- Location within North Macedonia
- Coordinates: 41.292530°N 22.525172°E
- Country: North Macedonia
- Region: Southeastern
- Municipality: Valandovo

Population (2021)
  - Total: 384
- Time zone: UTC+1 (CET)
  - Summer (DST): UTC+2 (CEST)
- Website: .

Brajkovci (Macedonian: Брајковци) is a village in the municipality of Valandovo, North Macedonia.

== Demographics ==
According to the 2002 census, the village had a total of 437 inhabitants. Ethnic groups in the village include:

- Macedonians 418
- Serbs 19

As of 2021, the village of Brajkovci has 384 inhabitants and the ethnic composition was the following:

- Macedonians – 360
- Serbs – 14
- Turks – 3
- others – 2
- Person without Data - 5
