= Star Dojran =

Star Dojran Стар Дојран
- Village
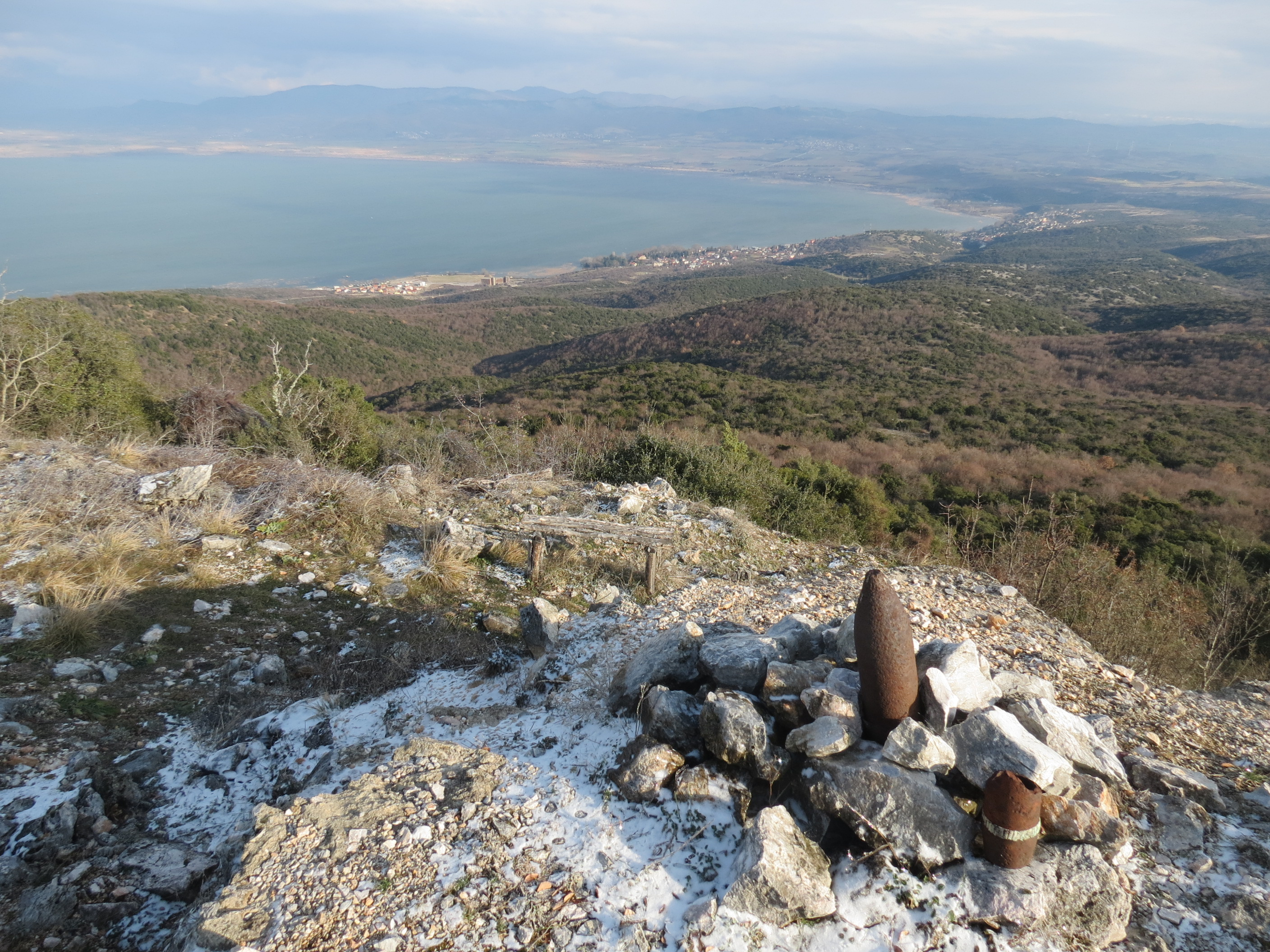

- Location within North Macedonia
- Coordinates: 41°11′11″N 22°43′13″E
- Country: North Macedonia
- Region: Southeastern
- Municipality: Dojran
- Elevation: 157 m (515 ft)

Population (2021)
  - Total: 413
- Time zone: UTC+1 (CET)
  - Summer (DST): UTC+2 (CEST)
- Postal code: 1487
- Area code: +389 34
- Vehicle registration: GE
- Climate: Cfa

Star Dojran (Macedonian: Стар Дојран) is a village in the southeastern part of North Macedonia. It is the seat of the municipality of Dojran. Star Dojran means "Old Dojran" in Macedonian.

== Demographics ==
As of the 2021 census, Star Dojran had 413 residents with the following ethnic composition:

- Macedonians: 288
- Turks: 56
- Persons for whom data are taken from administrative sources: 30
- Serbs: 18
- Romani: 11
- Albanians: 4
- Vlachs: 3
- Others: 3

According to the 2002 census, the settlement had a total of 363 inhabitants. Ethnic groups in the village include:

- Macedonians: 255
- Turks: 57
- Serbs: 32
- Romani: 9
- Albanians: 6
- Aromanians: 1
- Others: 3
