= Dojran =

Former city in North Macedonia

Coordinates: 41°10′45″N 22°43′29″E

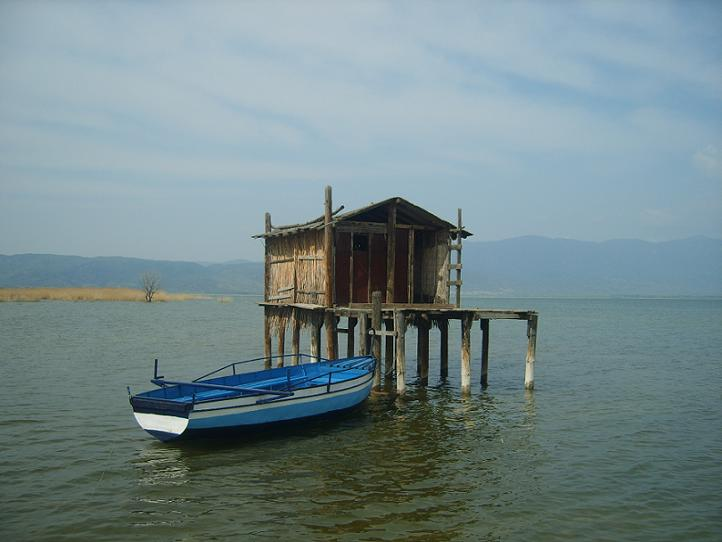
A small house in Lake Dojran and a fishing boat

Dojran (Macedonian: Дојран [ˈdɔjran]) was a city on the west shore of Lake Dojran in the southeast part of North Macedonia. Today, it is a collective name for two villages on the territory of the ruined city: Nov Dojran (New Dojran, settled from the end of World War I to World War II) and Star Dojran (Old Dojran), which contains both old ruins and recent construction, especially hotels, resorts, and restaurants. Dojran is 170 kilometers (110 mi) from Skopje, 59 kilometers (37 mi) from Strumica, and some 30 kilometers (19 mi) from Gevgelija. The nearest airports are Thessaloniki International Airport and Skopje Airport. The mayor of Dojran Municipality is currently Ango Angov. The old city of Dojran was totally ruined during the First World War, and the modern villages were established after the Second World War.

== History ==
Dojran, primarily Star Dojran, was first settled in prehistoric times, and the first written record of the city was in the 5th century BC, when the Greek historian Herodotus wrote about the Paeonians, an ancient Thraco-Illyrian people, who started and expanded the city. Herodotus notes how the Paeonians lived in settlements accessible only by boats, settlements that still exist today on the west and north shores of Lake Dojran, in between the cane zones and the lake itself. The economy of Dojran has always been primarily dependent on fishing, and success in the business is attributed to the traditional ancient fishing method used by the fishermen.

Dojran was the seat of a Roman Catholic bishop until it was conquered by the Ottoman Empire. Thereafter it served as a titular see.

=== Ottoman rule ===
During Ottoman rule, Dojran (also known as Toyran) developed according to the Turkish model of an Islamic city. The upper part was profoundly impacted by Turkish influence, with narrow streets, whereas the lower part retained its Macedonian roots, crossed with wide streets and modern public buildings. Houses were usually two-storied, arranged amphitheatrically, with a view onto the lake. The style of architecture was so similar to that of Thessaloniki (Macedonian: Solun) that Dojran came to be known as "Little Solun" (Macedonian: Mal Solun). The bazaar, near Lake Dojran, had 300 shops and craft workshops. Many Turkish dignitaries settled there after being impressed by the beauty of the city.

=== Post-Ottoman time ===
Dojran is North Macedonia's part of the former municipality of Doyuran, which was divided in 1913 by the new borders created between Greek Macedonia and what was then south Serbia.

World War I devastated the city physically and economically; destroying many cultural monuments and the fishing business. The population was forced to desert the city to escape bombardment. After the war, the population returned and formed Nov Dojran. Today the two villages are seen as one town although most new buildings are located in Star Dojran, and are devoted to attracting tourism. The old city had 5,000 inhabitants, while under city's control were the neighboring villages and with them the city's population amounts to 30,000 people.

== Architecture ==
The Amam (Hamam) is a Turkish bathhouse located in the upper part of the city, and in the past it was inhabited by the Turkish population. The year it was built is unknown and only parts of the tower remain. The Church of St. Ilija was built in 1874 in the northern part of the city. The current state of the church; fragments of paintings, suggests that the church walls were originally covered with frescoes. Dojran is also significant archaeologically due to numerous discoveries of accidental or systematic excavations including relief, marble plates with Greek inscriptions, remainders of walls, coins, and tombs with epitaphs.
