= Ǵopčeli =

Ǵopčeli Ѓопчели
- Village
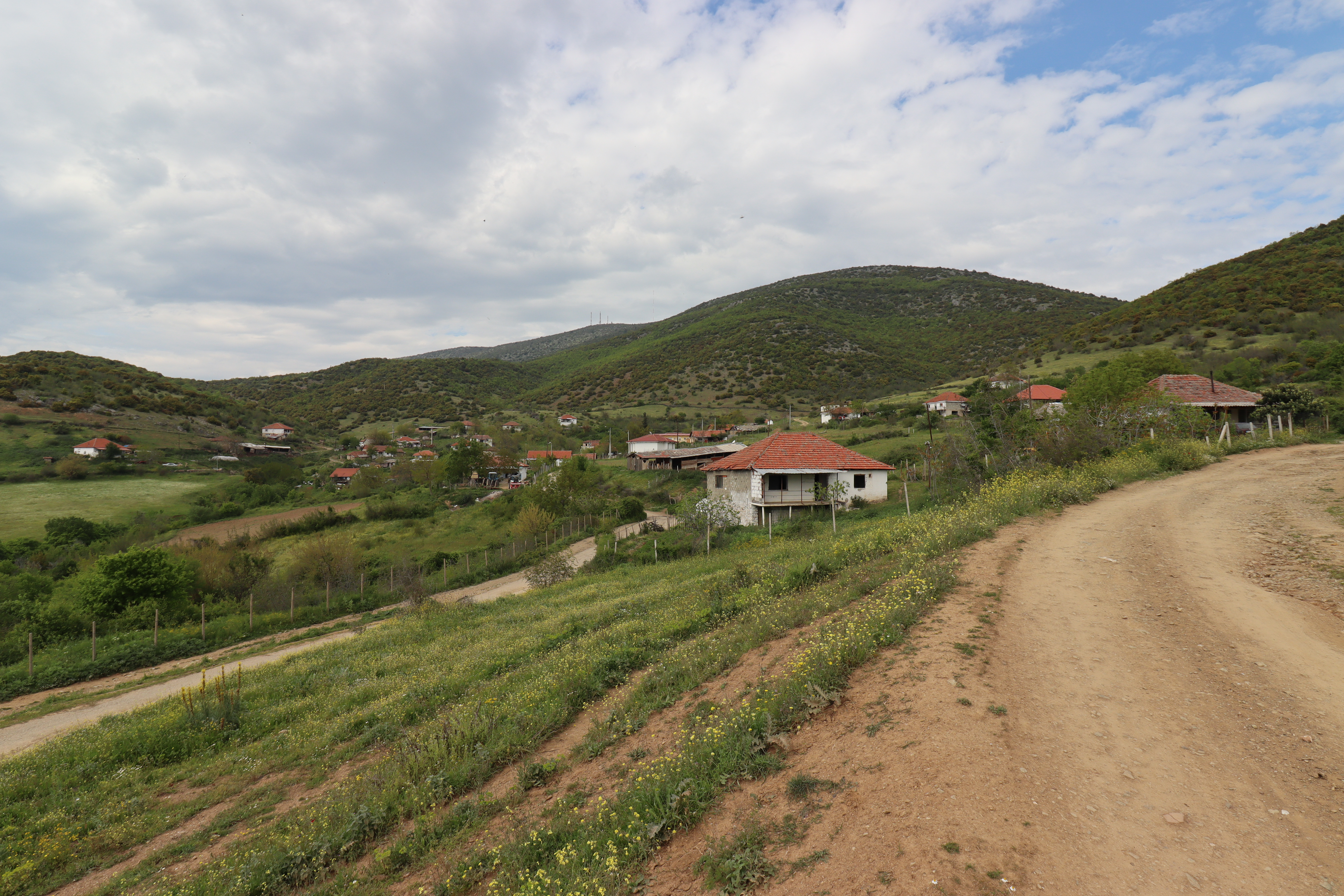
- View of the village

- Location within North Macedonia
- Coordinates: 41.255231°N 22.665375°E
- Country: North Macedonia
- Region: Southeastern
- Municipality: Dojran

Population (2021)
  - Total: 116
- Time zone: UTC+1 (CET)
  - Summer (DST): UTC+2 (CEST)
- Website: .

Ǵopčeli (Macedonian: Ѓопчели) is a village in the municipality of Dojran, North Macedonia.

== Demographics ==
As of the 2021 census, Ǵopčeli had 116 residents with the following ethnic composition:

- Turks 104
- Persons for whom data are taken from administrative sources 10
- Others 2

According to the 2002 census, the village had a total of 155 inhabitants. Ethnic groups in the village include:

- Turks 151
- Bosniaks 1
- Others 3
