= Stojakovo =

Stojakovo Стојаково
- Village
- Location within North Macedonia
- Coordinates: 41.156197°N 22.577690°E
- Country: North Macedonia
- Region: Southeastern
- Municipality: Bogdanci

Population (2021)
  - Total: 1,451
- Time zone: UTC+1 (CET)
  - Summer (DST): UTC+2 (CEST)
- Website: .

Stojakovo (Macedonian: Стојаково) is a village in the municipality of Bogdanci, North Macedonia. It is located close to the Greek border.

== Demographics ==
According to the 2002 census, the village had a total of 1,931 inhabitants. Ethnic groups in the village include:

- Macedonians 1,890
- Serbs 36
- Aromanians 1
- Other 4

As of 2021, the village of Stojakovo has 1.451 inhabitants and the ethnic composition was the following:

- Macedonians – 1.363
- Serbs - 12
- Turks – 1
- Aromanians – 1
- others – 3
- Person without Data - 71
