= Kurtamzali =

Kurtamzali Куртамзали
- Village
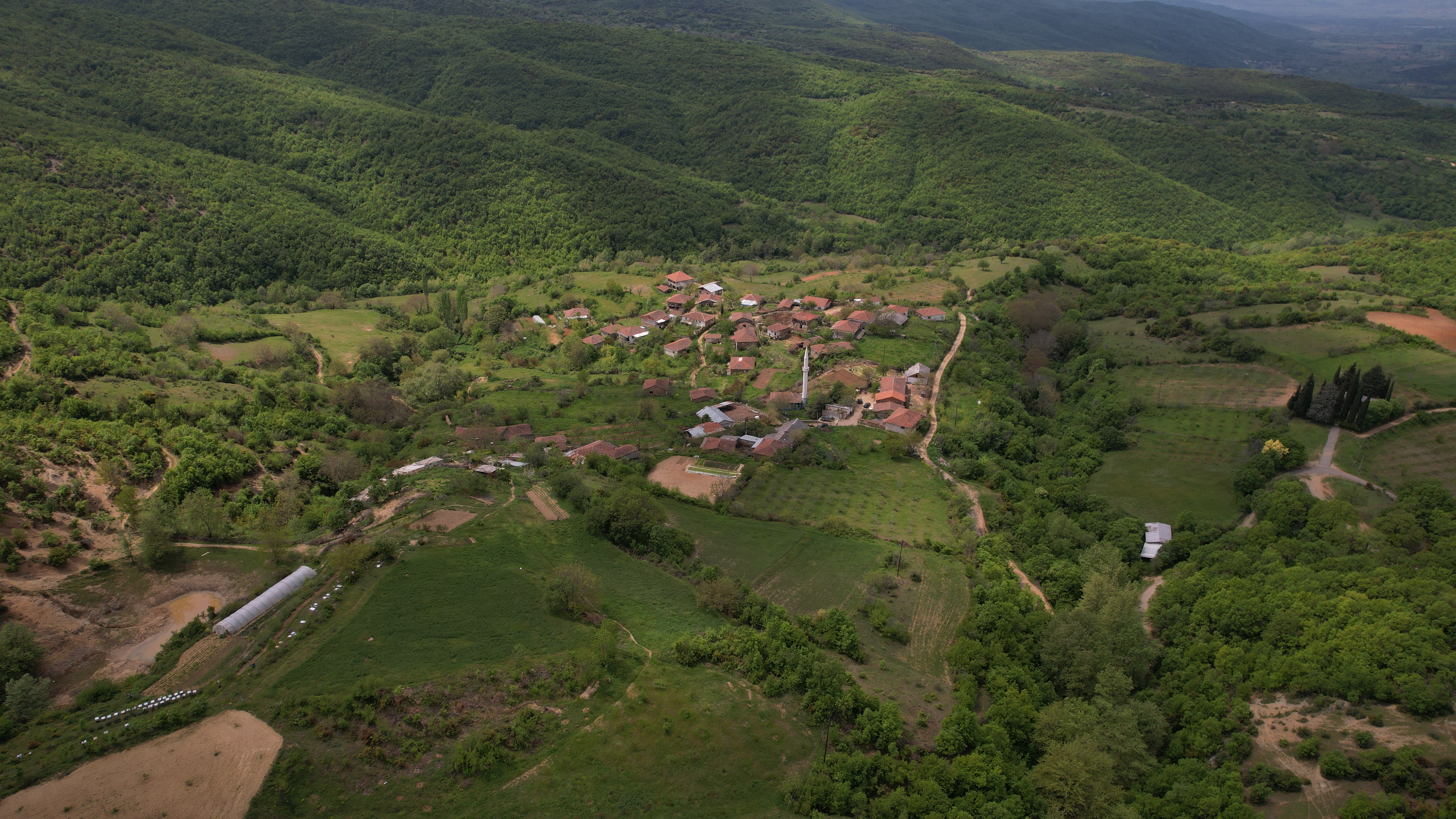
- Air view of the village Kurtamzali

- Location within North Macedonia
- Coordinates: 41.294981°N 22.694725°E
- Country: North Macedonia
- Region: Southeastern
- Municipality: Dojran

Population (2021)
  - Total: 42
- Time zone: UTC+1 (CET)
  - Summer (DST): UTC+2 (CEST)
- Website: .

Kurtamzali (Macedonian: Куртамзали) is a village in the municipality of Dojran, North Macedonia. It is located close to the Greek border.

== Demographics ==
As of the 2021 census, Kurtamzali had 42 residents with the following ethnic composition:

- Turks 32
- Persons for whom data are taken from administrative sources 10

According to the 2002 census, the village had a total of 121 inhabitants. Ethnic groups in the village include:

- Turks 119
- Others 2
