= Organdzali =

Organdzali Органџали
- Village
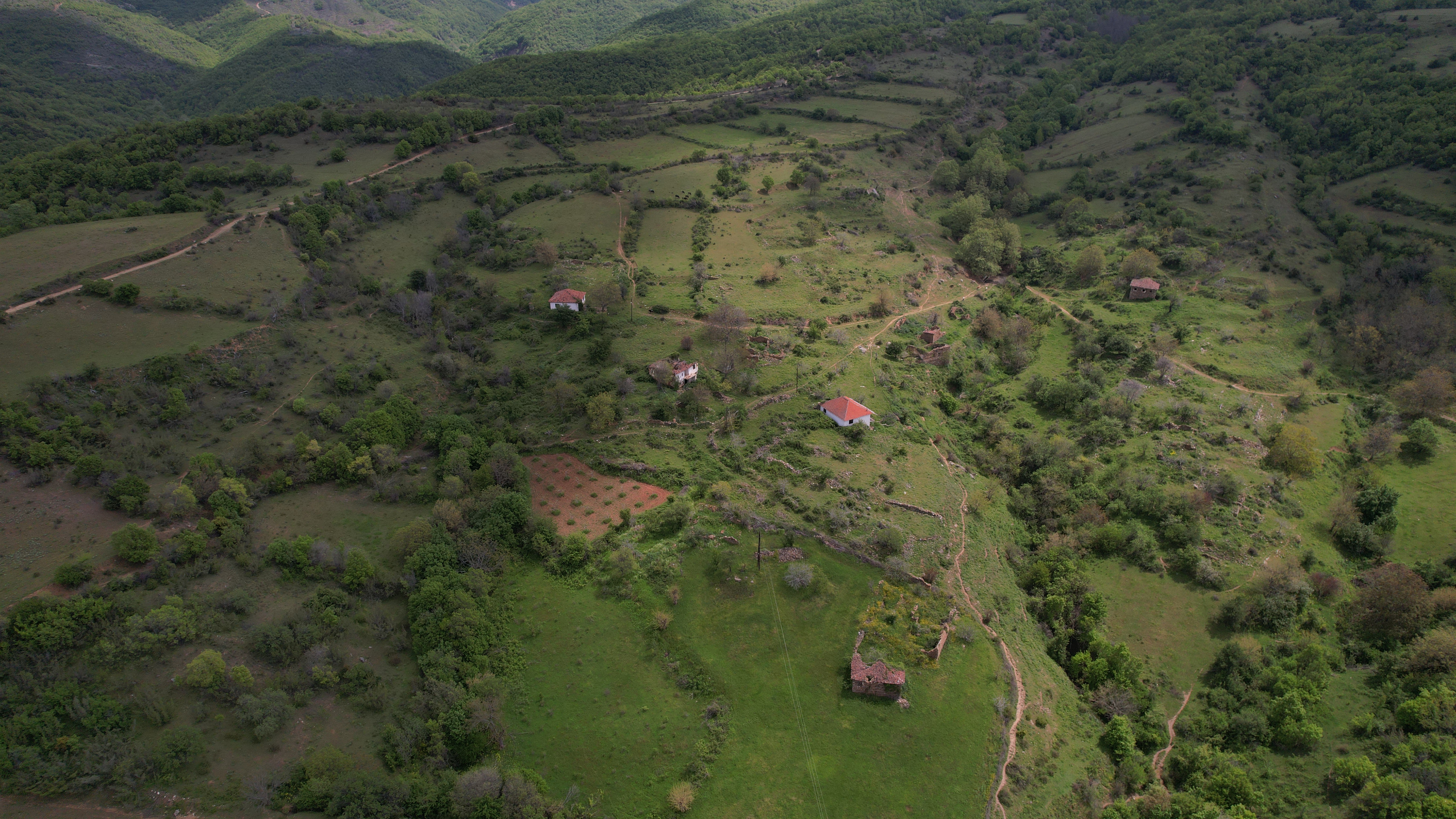
- Air view of the village

- Location within North Macedonia
- Coordinates: 41°17′47″N 22°42′15″E
- Country: North Macedonia
- Region: Southeastern
- Municipality: Dojran
- Elevation: 420 m (1,380 ft)

Population (2021)
  - Total: 0
- Time zone: UTC+1 (CET)
  - Summer (DST): UTC+2 (CEST)
- Postal code: 1487
- Area code: +389 34
- Car plates: GE
- Climate: Cfb

Organdzali (Macedonian: Органџали, Turkish: Urgancılı) is a village in the southeastern part of North Macedonia. It is located in the municipality of Dojran.

== Demographics ==
As of the 2021 census, Organdzali had zero residents.

According to the 2002 census, the settlement had a total of 21 inhabitants. Ethnic groups in the village include:

- Turks 21
