= Prsten =

Prsten Прстен
- Village
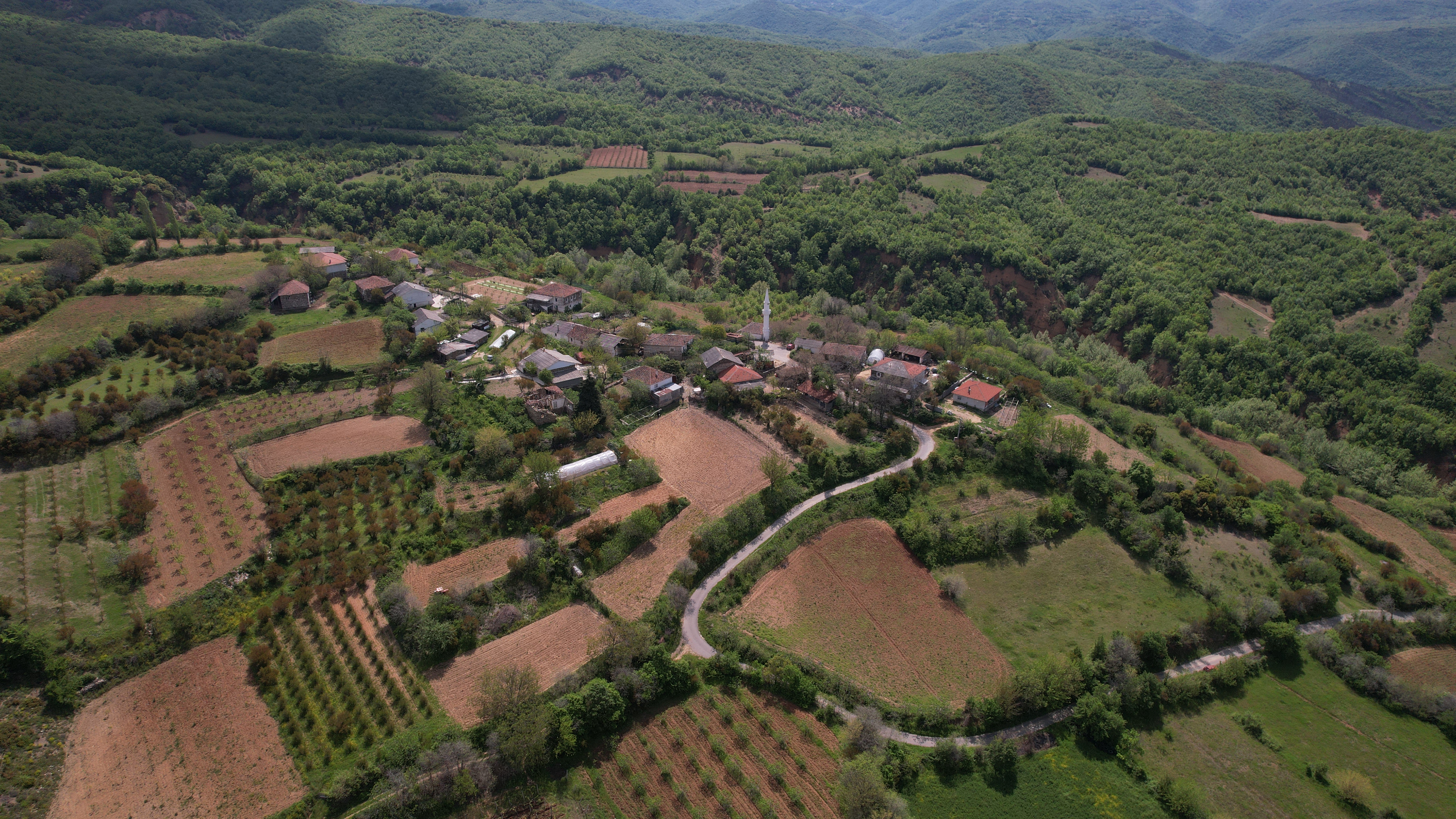
- Air view of the village

- Location within North Macedonia
- Coordinates: 41.316101°N 22.661331°E
- Country: North Macedonia
- Region: Southeastern
- Municipality: Valandovo

Population (2021)
  - Total: 30
- Time zone: UTC+1 (CET)
  - Summer (DST): UTC+2 (CEST)
- Website: .

Prsten (Macedonian: Прстен) is a village in the municipality of Valandovo, North Macedonia.

== Demographics ==
As of the 2021 census, Prsten had 30 residents with the following ethnic composition:

- Turks 29

According to the 2002 census, the village had a total of 68 inhabitants. Ethnic groups in the village include:

- Turks 68
