= Kazandol =

Kazandol Казандол
- Village
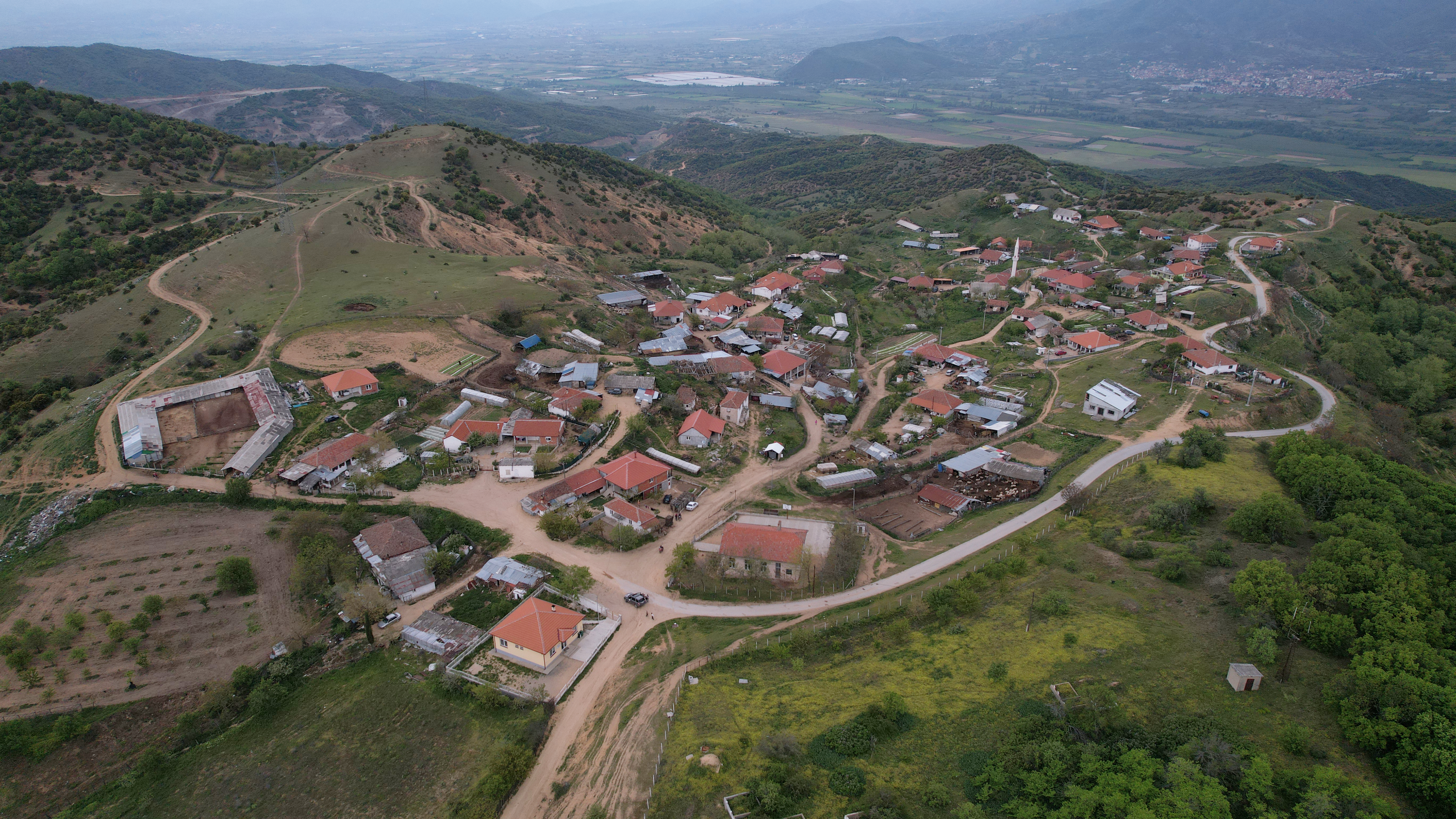
- Airview of the village

- Location within North Macedonia
- Coordinates: 41.274881°N 22.572959°E
- Country: North Macedonia
- Region: Southeastern
- Municipality: Valandovo

Population (2021)
  - Total: 182
- Time zone: UTC+1 (CET)
  - Summer (DST): UTC+2 (CEST)
- Website: .

Kazandol (Macedonian: Казандол) is a village in the municipality of Valandovo, North Macedonia.

== Demographics ==
According to the 2002 census, the village had a total of 147 inhabitants. Ethnic groups in the village include:

- Turks 147

As of 2021, the village of Kazandol has 182 inhabitants and the ethnic composition was the following:

- Turks – 167
- Albanians - 1
- Bosniaks – 1
- Person without Data - 13
