= Kočuli =

Kočuli Кочули
- Village
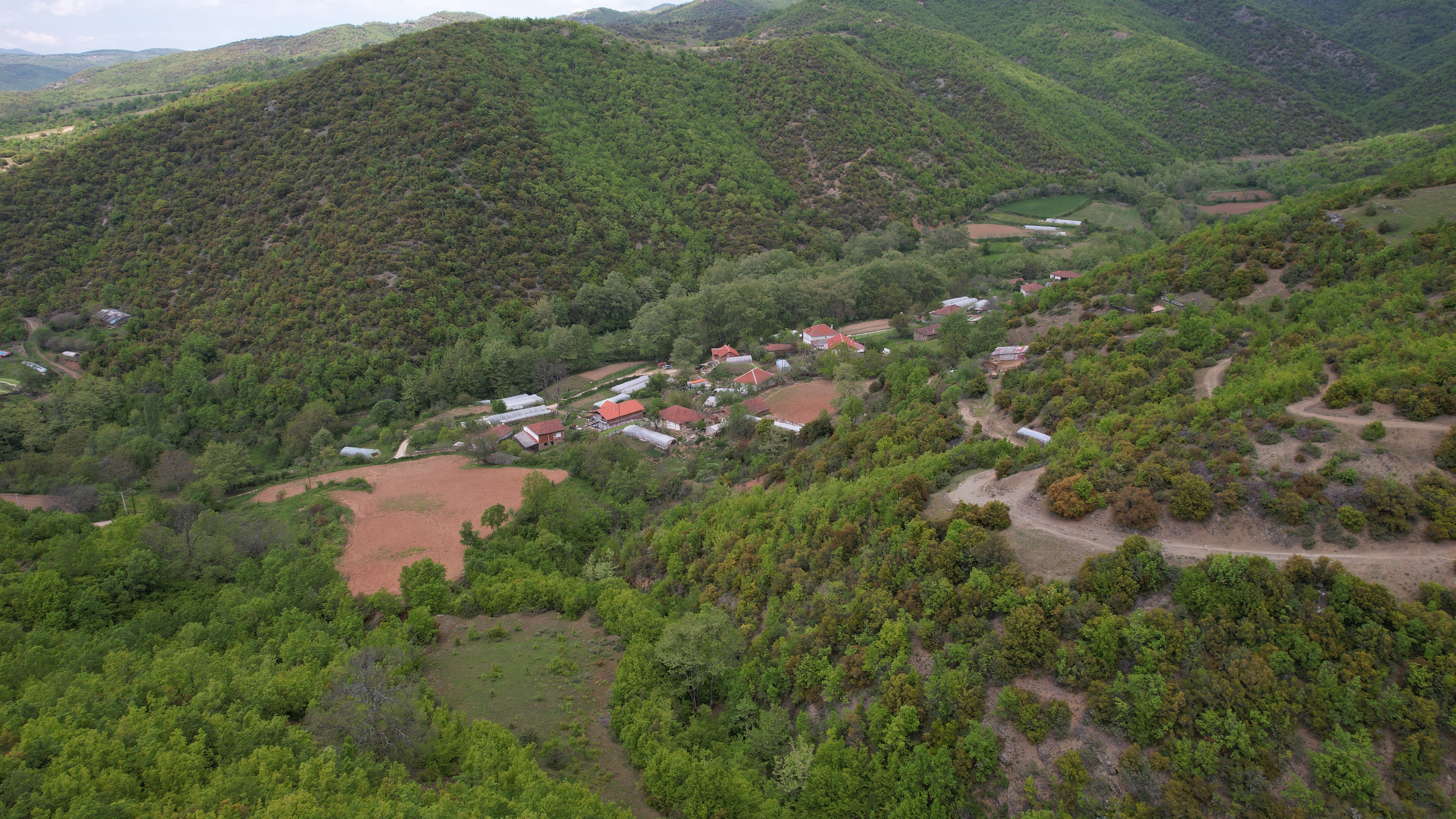
- Airview of the village

- Location within North Macedonia
- Coordinates: 41.310992°N 22.695365°E
- Country: North Macedonia
- Region: Southeastern
- Municipality: Valandovo

Population (2021)
  - Total: 53
- Time zone: UTC+1 (CET)
  - Summer (DST): UTC+2 (CEST)
- Website: .

Kočuli (Macedonian: Кочули) is a village in the municipality of Valandovo, North Macedonia. It is located near the Greek border.

== Demographics ==
According to the 2002 census, the village had a total of 50 inhabitants. Ethnic groups in the village include:

- Turks 49
- Others 1

As of 2021, the village of Kochuli has 53 inhabitants and the ethnic composition was the following:

- Turks – 50
- Bosniaks – 1
- Person without Data - 2
