= Čalakli =

Čalakli Чалакли
- Village
- Location within North Macedonia
- Coordinates: 41.303116°N 22.640836°E
- Country: North Macedonia
- Region: Southeastern
- Municipality: Valandovo

Population (2021)
  - Total: 412
- Time zone: UTC+1 (CET)
  - Summer (DST): UTC+2 (CEST)
- Website: .

Čalakli (Macedonian: Чалакли) is a village in the municipality of Valandovo, North Macedonia. It is located close to the Greek border.

== Demographics ==
According to the 2002 census, the village had a total of 385 inhabitants. Ethnic groups in the village include:

- Turks 381
- Serbs 3
- Others 1

As of 2021, the village of Chalakli has 412 inhabitants and the ethnic composition was the following:

- Turks - 388
- Albanians – 1
- Serbs – 1
- Person without Data - 22
