= Durutli =

Durutli Дурутли
- Village
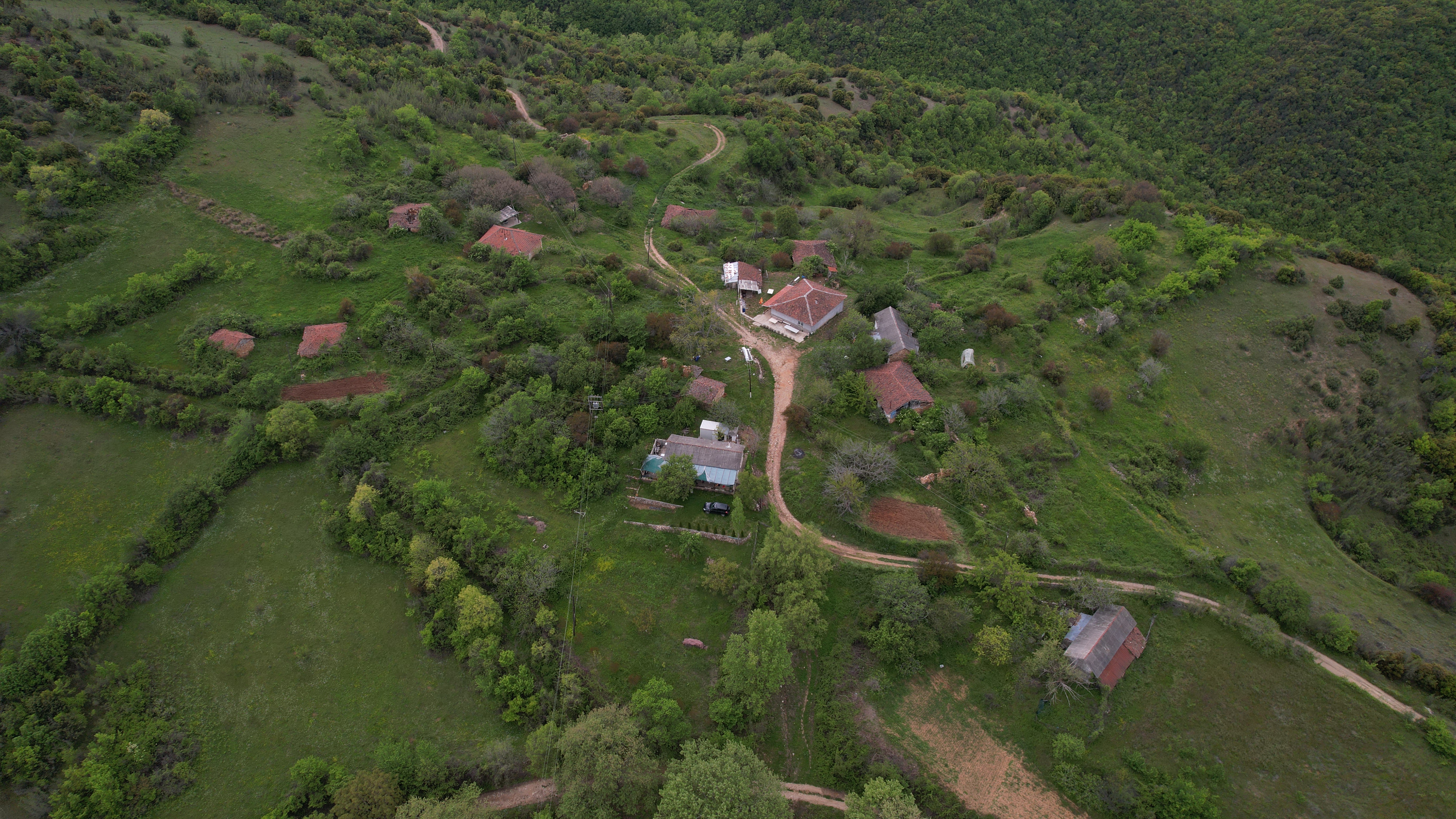
- Air view of the village Durutli

- Location within North Macedonia
- Coordinates: 41°17′36″N 22°40′40″E
- Country: North Macedonia
- Region: Southeastern
- Municipality: Dojran
- Elevation: 402 m (1,319 ft)

Population (2021)
  - Total: 4
- Time zone: UTC+1 (CET)
  - Summer (DST): UTC+2 (CEST)
- Postal code: 1487
- Area code: +389 34
- Car plates: GE
- Climate: Cfb

Durutli (Macedonian: Дурутли, Turkish: Durutlu) is a village in the southeastern part of North Macedonia. It is located in the municipality of Dojran.

== Demographics ==
As of the 2021 census, Durutli had 4 residents with the following ethnic composition:

- Persons for whom data are taken from administrative sources 3
- Turks 1

According to the 2002 census, the settlement had a total of 16 inhabitants. Ethnic groups in the village include:

- Turks 16
