= Ivan Stoilković =

Macedonian politician

- Иван Стоилковиќ
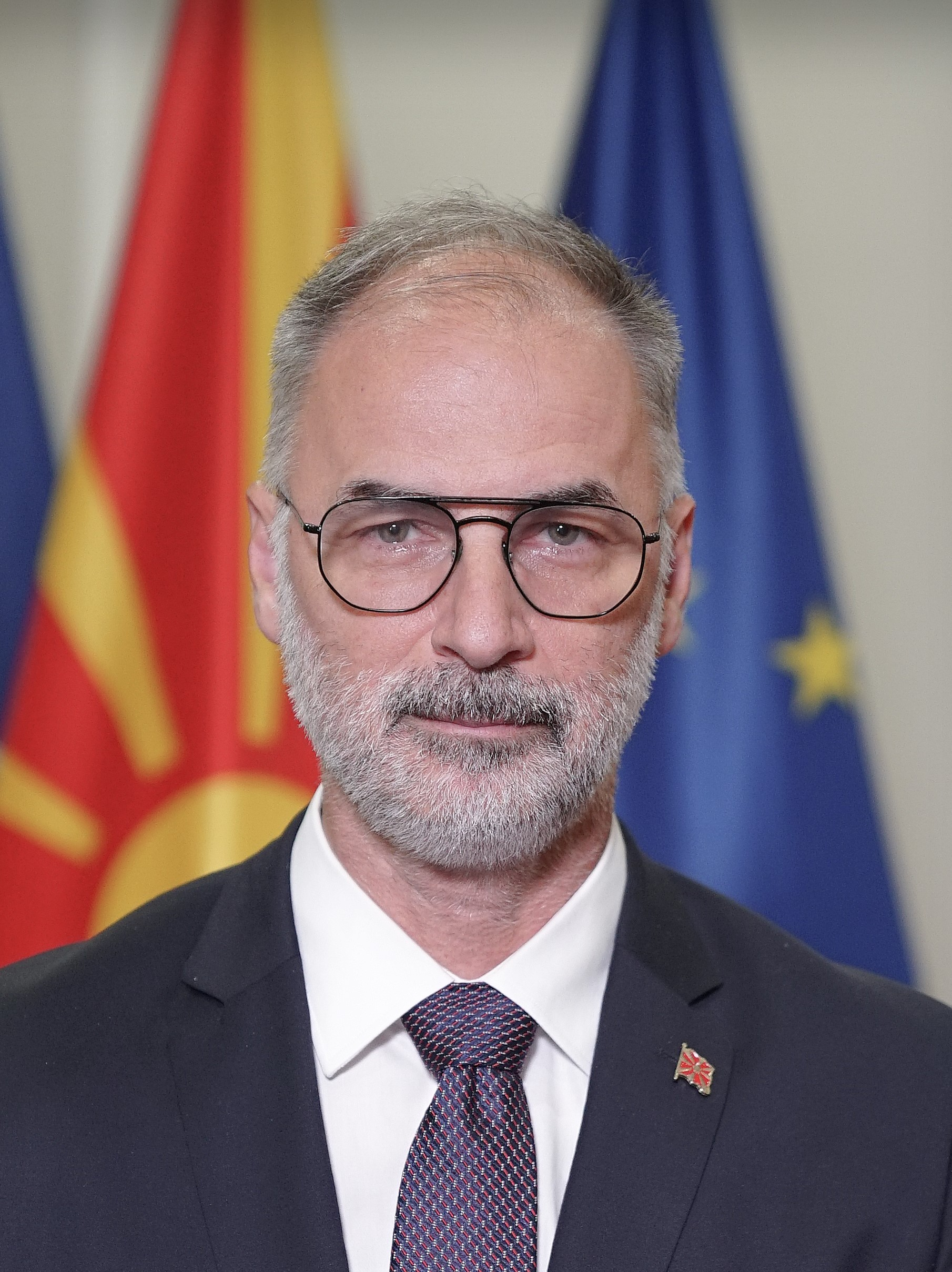
- Stoilković in 2024

Deputy Prime Minister of North Macedonia
- Incumbent
- Assumed office 23 June 2024
- Prime Minister: Hristijan Mickoski
- Preceded by: Artan Grubi

Minister of Inter-Community Relations
- Incumbent
- Assumed office 23 June 2024
- Prime Minister: Hristijan Mickoski
- Preceded by: Artan Grubi

Member of the Assembly of North Macedonia
- In office 2002–2024

Personal details
- Born: 15 February 1962 (age 64) Kumanovo, PR Macedonia, FPR Yugoslavia
- Party: DPSM
- Education: Ss. Cyril and Methodius University

Ivan Stoilković (Macedonian: Иван Стоилковиќ, Serbian Cyrillic: Иван Стоилковић, born 15 February 1962) is a Macedonian politician serving as deputy prime minister of North Macedonia and minister of inter-community relations since 2024. An ethnic Serb, he has been the president of the Democratic Party of Serbs in Macedonia (DPSM) since 2001 and a member of the Assembly of North Macedonia from 2002 to 2024.

== Early life, education and business career ==
He was born on 15 February 1962 in Kumanovo. After finishing high school, he enrolled at the Faculty of Law at the Ss. Cyril and Methodius University of Skopje. In 1992, he founded a construction company LAMAX CO in Kumanovo and was its director until 1992. He is an ethnic Serb.

== Political career ==
In 1992, he joined the Democratic Party of Serbs in Macedonia and was later elected party president in 2001. From 2002 to 2024, he served as a member of the Assembly of North Macedonia. He was the chair of the Parliamentary Group of the Assembly of the Republic of Macedonia for Cooperation with the Parliament of the Russian Federation.

According to the Crime and Corruption Reporting Network (KRIK), Stoilković played a role in a coordinated propaganda campaign during the political crisis in Macedonia in 2017. According to them, Stoilković facilitated the meeting of Serbian MP and journalist Miroslav Lazanski with Prime Minister Nikola Gruevski, with the meeting being orchestrated by Goran Živaljević, a member of Serbia's Security Intelligence Agency (BIA).

In a 2018 interview he said that relations between Serbia and Macedonia have never been worse because of Macedonia's "anti-Serbian politics". In May 2024, Stoilković participated in a security forum in Moscow. In June 2024, Stoilković was a participant at the All-Serbian Assembly in Belgrade.

Following the 2024 North Macedonian parliamentary election, Stoilković was elected to the Assembly of North Macedonia once again and was nominated as deputy prime minister of North Macedonia and minister of inter-community relations by Hristijan Mickoski. His nomination was criticized by North Macedonia's Albanian political parties. The new government of North Macedonia was sworn in on 23 June 2024 and Stoilković assumed office as government minister.

== Political positions ==
Stoilković holds pro-Russian and pro-Serbian political positions. Stoilković is a critic of the United States military interventions abroad, especially the 1999 NATO bombing of Yugoslavia. He criticized the decision of the Government of North Macedonia to recognize Kosovo's independence and to support the United Nations General Assembly Resolution 78/282, which designated 11 July as the International Day of Reflection and Commemoration of the 1995 Genocide in Srebrenica. In a post on social media, he referred to the Srebrenica genocide as "necrophilic Disneyland", which was subject to criticism by a lawyer, the Party of Democratic Action of Macedonia, and the Social Democratic Union of Macedonia.
