= Serbs of North Macedonia =

Ethnic group

Србите во Северна Македонија Срби у Севернoj Македонији Srbi u Severnoj Makedoniji
- Ethnic flag of Serbs of North Macedonia

Total population
- 23,847 (2021)

Regions with significant populations
- Skopje, Kumanovo, Staro Nagoričane, Čučer-Sandevo

Languages
- Macedonian and Serbian

Religion
- Eastern Orthodoxy

Serbs are a recognized ethnic minority in North Macedonia. According to data from the 2021 census, the population of ethnic Serbs in North Macedonia is 23,847, constituting 1.3% of the total population.

== History ==
=== Middle Ages ===
The Early Slavs had pillaged the Balkans as early as the 520s. The South Slavic territories were called Sclaviniae (lit. Slav lands), and were from times independent from the Byzantine Empire. In 577, some 100,000 Slavs poured into Thrace and Illyricum, pillaging cities and settling down. By the 580s, as the Slav communities on the Danube became larger and more organised, and as the Avars exerted their influence, raids became larger and resulted in permanent settlement. By 581, many Slavic tribes had settled the land around Thessaloniki, though never taking the city itself, creating a Macedonian Sclavinia. In 586 AD, as many as 100,000 Slav warriors raided Thessaloniki. In De Administrando Imperio, the Serbs trace their origin to the migration of the White Serbs led by an unnamed 7th-century Serbian ruler, who took the protection of the Byzantine Emperor Heraclius (r. 610-641). Part of the White Serbs, who settled in modern Greek Macedonia (around Servia), subsequently moved to the north and settled the lands that would become the early Serbian Principality. Constans II conquered Sclavinia in 656-657, "capturing many and subduing them", he also resettled Slavs from the Vardar area to Asia Minor, to a city named Gordoservon (Greek: Γορδοσερβα, City of Serbs). The "Sclaviniae of Macedonia" (Sclavenias penes Macedoniam) were conquered in 785 by Constantine VI (r. 776–797), meanwhile, a Serbian Principality was established to the northwest.

In 681, Bulgars established the Bulgarian Khanate. By Peter I of Bulgaria's reign, a symbiosis between the Bulgars and Slavs occurred. They established a form of Bulgarian national identity that, despite far from modern nationalism helped them to survive as a distinct ethnicity through the centuries. Almost the whole of Macedonia was incorporated into Bulgaria in the mid-9th century during the rule of Khan Presian and his first minister Isbul. In 924 the Bulgarian Tsar Simeon I conquered Serbia for a short time. In 971-972, Eastern Bulgaria was conquered by John Tzimiskes, who burned down Bulgarian capital Preslav, capturing Tsar Boris II. The series of events are not clear due to contradicting sources, but it is sure that after 971, the Cometopuli brothers were the de facto rulers of the Western Bulgarian lands. Tsar Samuel then became a general under Roman I of Bulgaria, and co-ruled with him from 977 to 997. In 997, Roman died in captivity in Constantinople and Samuel was chosen as the new Emperor of Bulgaria. The political center of the Bulgarian realm was moved then to Macedonia, Ohrid served as capital and seat of the Bulgarian Patriarchate. By 997, Serbia had been conquered and made again subject to Bulgaria by Tsar Samuel. When the Byzantines finally defeated the Bulgarians in 1018, they regained control over most of the Balkans for the first time in four centuries.

Kingdom of Serbia at the end of the 13th and early 14th century. (1.Stefan Milutin's state; 2. Stefan Dragutin's state; 3. Stefan Milutin's conquests up to 1299; 4. temporary loss of land in Hum)

In 1092, Grand Prince Vukan defeated an army sent by Byzantine Emperor Alexios I Komnenos. Alexios I responded by sending a much larger army, but it was stopped by Serbian envoys wanting to negotiate. Peace was concluded, and Alexios returned to tackle the plundering Cumans. Vukan however, immediately violated the treaty, launching an operation in the Vardar region, conquering the cities of Vranje, Skopje and Tetovo, with much loot. Vukan then sent messengers to Skopje, attempting to justify his actions as a consequence of unjust administration by the Byzantines. Alexios once again accepted peace, this time with the promise of Serbian hostages (a sign of definite peace), he returned to Constantinople and tasked the local leaders to repair the damaged structures on the border. Vukan did not send the hostages as promised, prompting Alexios to send John Komnenos, his nephew and commander of Dyrrhachium, towards Serbia. Vukan bought time by once again promising peace and hostages, only to simultaneously prepare an attack against them. In the night the Byzantine camp was surprise-attacked, with the majority of Byzantine soldiers being killed. Vukan went on to loot Skopje, Polog, then ravaging Vranje, and finally returning to Serbia. Alexios sent a last army, entering Lipljan without resistance, Vukan's messengers offered a conclusive peace and the previously promised hostages, and as Alexios had more problems in other places of the Empire, peace was agreed in 1094, and Vukan surrendered twenty hostages.

The Byzantine Emperor Constantine Porphyrogenitos wrote in about 950 that the city of "Ta Serbia" situated north-west from Thessaloniki, derived its name from its Serbian founders in the early 7th century. In the 12th century the city is mentioned as "Srpchishte" in the manuscript by the Byzantine author John Zonara.

In 1189, the regions of Skopje and Tetovo were conquered by Stefan Nemanja. In the late 1200s, Strez, a Bulgarian royalty of the Asen dynasty, fled to Serbia after a feud with Emperor Boril, who had taken the throne. Strez was for a time a Duke under Stefan Nemanjić and had by 1209 conquered most of Macedonia; from the Struma valley in the east, which bordered lands controlled by Boril, to Bitola and perhaps Ohrid in the west, and from Skopje in the north to Veria in the south. While Strez quickly gained the support of the local population and possibly inherited the remaining administration from Boril's rule, Serbian units nevertheless remained in his domains, either to guarantee his loyalty or with the intent to oust him and annex his lands. In 1215, the region is taken by the Latins and Despotate of Epirus. In 1223, Theodore Komnenos ruled Macedonia as Despot of Epirus (proclaimed Emperor) with his Greek, Serb and Albanian lieutenants, who held lands to the Serbian border beyond Principality of Arbanon, Debar and Skoplje.

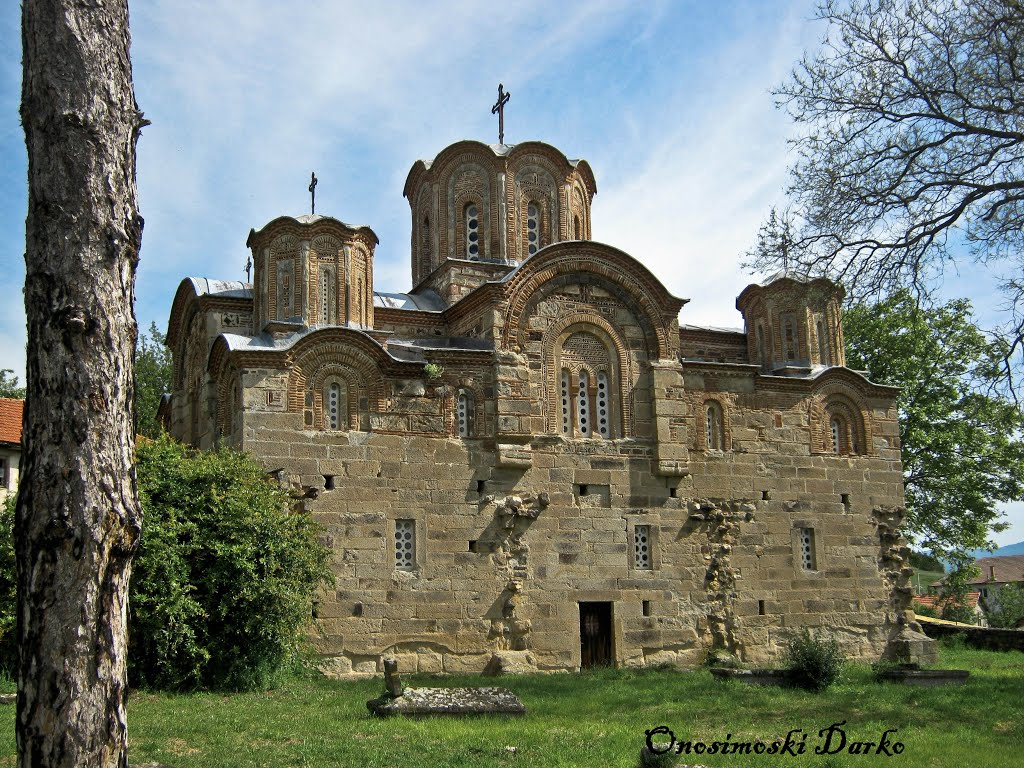
Church of St. George in Staro Nagoričane, built by King Stefan Milutin

In 1230, Theodore was defeated and captured by Emperor Ivan Asen II in the battle of Klokotnitsa, and lands west of Adrianople were once again part of Bulgaria; all the way to Durrës, Ivan Asen wrote in a memorial column that he conquered "His [Theodore Komnenos'] whole land from Odrin (Edirne) to Drach (Durrës), also Greek, Albanian and Serb" after the victory. Between 1246 and 1265, John Vatatzes conquered Macedonia from the Adrianople to the Vardar, while the Bulgarian emperor Michael I Asen had the towns west of the Vardar: Veles, Prilep and Ohrid. In 1252, John overcame Michael, and most of Macedonia towards the border of Serbia became a Nicaean province. After the 13th century, the Bulgarian empire lost Macedonia.

Demetrios Chomatenos, the Archbishop of Ohrid from 1216 to 1236, registered the naming culture of the South Slavs in Byzantine lands. In the 11th and 12th century, family names became more common and stable in Byzantium, adapted by the majority of people in Byzantine Macedonia, Epirus and other regions (including women, sometimes even monks), not only aristocrats. The South Slavs, however, maintained the tradition of only giving a personal name, sometimes with a Patronymic. There are only two cases of family names used by South Slavs during this time; Bogdanopoulos and Serbopoulos, both Slavic names with the Greek suffix -opoulos (όπουλος, originating in Peloponnese in the 10th century).

In 1258, King Stefan Uroš I of Serbia took Skopje, Prilep and Kičevo from the Byzantines, but lost them shortly after in 1261. Serbia's conquest of the areas south of the Shara mountain chain, on the plains of Polog, and in Byzantine dominated places like Skopje and later Serres (Slavic: Ser) began with the expansion of Serbian King Milutin in 1282. With the victory over the Bulgarian army near Velbazhd (today's Kyustendil, Republic of Bulgaria) in 1331, the Morava and upper Vardar basins were secured for the Serbian state.

In a chrysobull of Andronicus II, dated 1294, the kataphrylax of Serres, "Jovan the Serb" was mentioned (Ἱωάννης ό Σἐρβος). A Byzantine Serb military family of Thessaloniki, Deblitzenos, produced several soldiers holding titles such as pronoia, tzaousios, of which is also mentioned in documents of the Emperor.

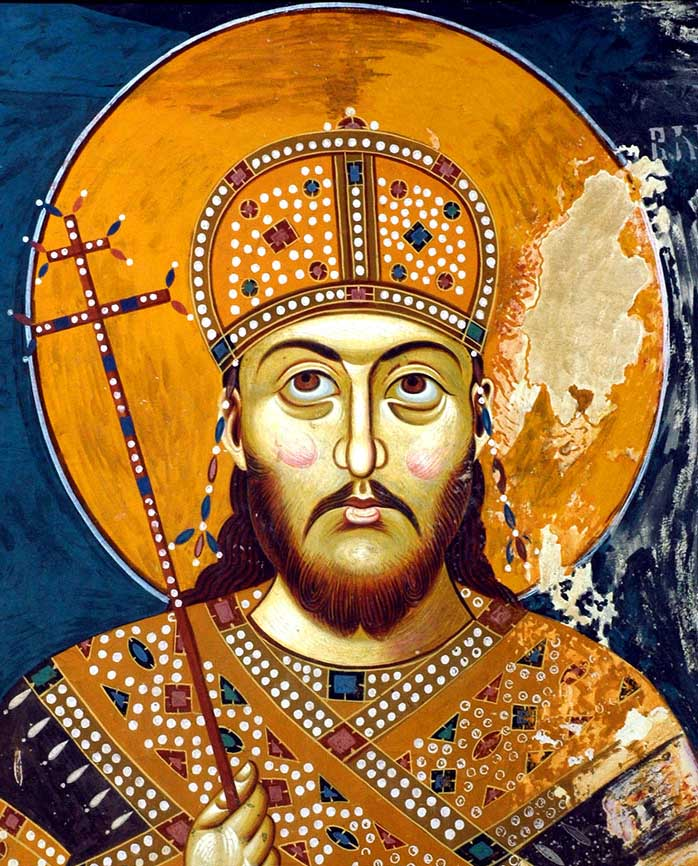
Emperor Stefan Dušan proclaimed Skopje as the capital of the Serbian Empire

In 1330, the Bulgarians attacked Serbia to stop the Serb penetration in Macedonia but were defeated in the battle of Velbazhd and while Bulgaria did not lose territory to Serbia, it could not prevent the latter from conquering Macedonia from the Byzantine Empire which had descended into a disastrous civil war. Of the event, both Dušan and his father recall that the Bulgarian emperor went against "Our country, against the lands of our fathers" and "Serbian territory" in relation to Macedonia.

By 1345, the whole of Macedonia and parts of western Thrace were under Stefan Dušan's newly established Serbian Empire. After these successes Dušan proclaimed himself Emperor in 1345 at Serres and was crowned in Skopje on April 16, 1346 as "Emperor and autocrat of Serbs and Romans" (Greek Bασιλεὺς καὶ αὐτoκράτωρ Σερβίας καὶ Pωμανίας) by the Serbian Patriarch, Joanikije II, with the help of the Bulgarian Patriarch, Simeon, and the Archbishop of Ohrid, Nicholas. Settling of Serb military and upper class citizens in Veria is mentioned in 1350, after Dušan the Mighty had conquered the town in between 1343 and 1347 and driven out all the inhabitants in fear of a revolt. Kantakouzenes asserts the Veria Serbs numbered 30 nobles and 1,500 soldiers, with their families.

=== Ottoman rule ===
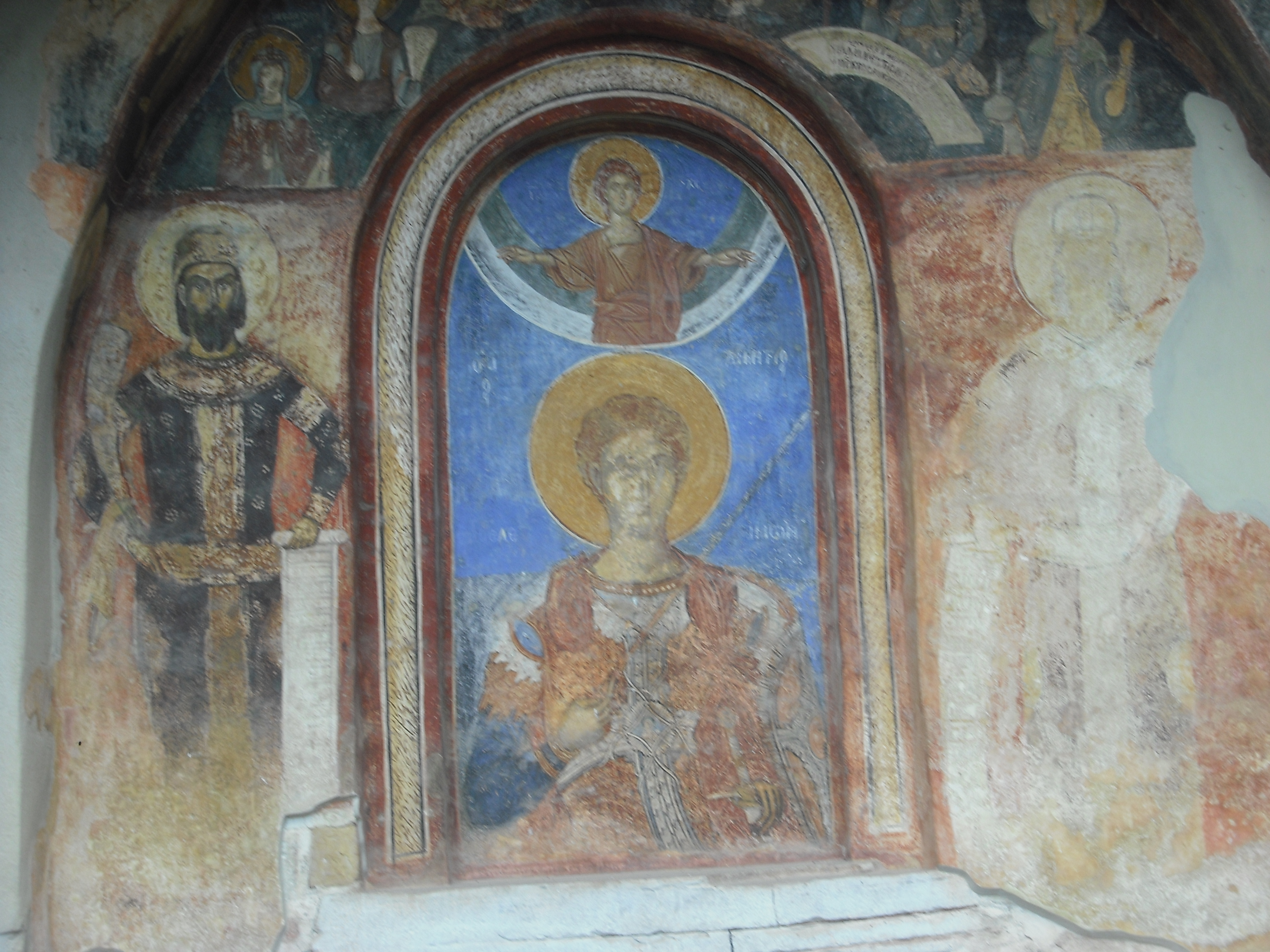
Fresco above entrance of the church at Marko's Monastery, with Prince Marko (left) and his father, King Vukašin (right)

The Ottoman invasion of Serbia was challenged at the Battle of Maritsa in 1371 by Serbian magnates Vukašin and Uglješa at the river Maritsa (in Bulgaria) which ended in Serbian defeat. This defeat, which culminated with the fall of Skopje in 1392, Trnovo in 1393, in combination with the consequences of the Battle of Kosovo (1389) led to increasing presence of Ottoman Turks and Islam. The Ottomans converted population groups of Christian Slavs into Islam. In the middle of the 17th century, Grand Vizier Mehmed Köprülü successfully converted peoples of the Danube region, and notably the Serbs of Dibra (Debar) in western Macedonia. The Serbian Patriarchate of Peć had spiritual power extending over Macedonia which continued the Serbian consciousness in a part of the South Slavic people of the region. In the second half of the 15th century, Orthodox scribe Vladislav the Grammarian considered Macedonia a "Serb land".

In 1557, Mehmed Sokolović, an Ottoman commander of Serb origin, restored the Serbian Patriarchate of Peć, appointing his still Christian relative, Makarije, as the Patriarch. Tetovo, Skopje, Štip, and Radovište are placed under the Serbian Church, while Ohrid, Monastir, Debar, and Prilep remains under the Archbishopric of Ohrid (Greek). In 1580, Jovan the Serb of Kratovo authored a Gospel book. All missions to Russia from Macedonia were described as "Serbian", the first of which was in 1585, by Visarion, the Metropolitan of Kratovo and his entourage of monks from other places. In 1641, the Metropolitan of Skopje, Simeon, travels to Russia and signs himself as "of the land of Serbia". In 1687 a petition of Jeftimije, Metropolitan of Skoplje; "of the Serbian lands of the Church of Skoplje". Although, unquestionably, the preceding were all under the Serb see, similarly clergy from the southern, Ecumenical dioceses, too described themselves as Serbs. In 1625, Sergius of Greben mentions that he had been "consecrated by Nektarije, Archbishop of Ochrida, in the land of Serbia". In 1634, Archbishop Avram of Ohrid replies that they came from "the Serbian country, from the town of Ochrida", similarly, in 1643, German of Kremenec says he is from the Serbian country, from Kostur, In 1648, "the Serb Dimitrje Nikolajev" from Kostur. In 1704, "Serb Bratan Jovanov came to Russia from the land of Macedonia".

From the beginning of the 18th century only Bulgarians were mentioned in Macedonia from foreign travallers, implying they gradually absorbed the smaller Serbian ethnic element. According to Jovan Cvijic this mixture of Bulgarians and Serbs formed an amorphous Slavic mass, without clear ethnic consciousness. Per Cvijic these Slavs was to remain amorphous during the 18th and the beginning of the 19th century; but after the turn of the century these people, already Bulgarian in name, began to adopt a Bulgarian national identity. In 1766 - 1767, the Bulgarian Archbishopric of Ohrid and the Serbian Patriarchate of Peć were abolished, the former dioceses becoming part of the Patriarchate of Constantinople, which had Greek liturgy. In 1870 the Bulgarian Exarchate, which used Slavic liturgy and was deemed schismatic, was recognized by the Ottoman Empire, and subsequently two thirds of the Slavic population of Macedonia joined the Exarchate.

In the 19th century, the ethnic Serbian areas outside (south) of the Principality of Serbia were designated by Serbian cartographers as "Old Serbia", claiming that the inhabitants of this region (Kratovo, Skopje, Ovče Pole) described their native districts as "Serbian lands".

The wars of Principality of Serbia and Principality of Montenegro, and then Russian Empire, against the Ottoman Empire motivated liberation movements among the people in Kosovo and Macedonia (known at the time as "Old Serbia" or "southern Serbia"). Serbia sought to liberate the Kosovo Vilayet (sanjaks of Niš, Prizren, Skopje, and Novi Pazar). The Serbian Army was joined by southern Serbs who made up special volunteer detachments, a large number being from Macedonia, who wanted to liberate their home regions and unify them with Serbia. These volunteers were infiltrated into the Kumanovo and Kriva Palanka districts. When peace was signed between the Serbs and Ottomans, these groups conducted independent guerrilla fighting under the Serbian flag, which they carried and flew far south of the demarcation line. The Serbian advance in Old Serbia (1877–78) was followed with uprisings for the Serbian cause in the region, including a notable one that broke out in the counties of Kumanovo, Kriva Palanka, and Kratovo, known as the Kumanovo Uprising (January–May 1878). Following the uprising, the Ottoman government most notably prohibited the use of the appellation "Serbian". Also, Serbian nationalism in Macedonia was persecuted, while Bulgarian influence in the region became more common. Mass migrations from Macedonia into Serbia followed after reprisals, with their former villages being settled by Albanians (such as in Matejče, Otlja, Kosmatec, Murgaš, and others).

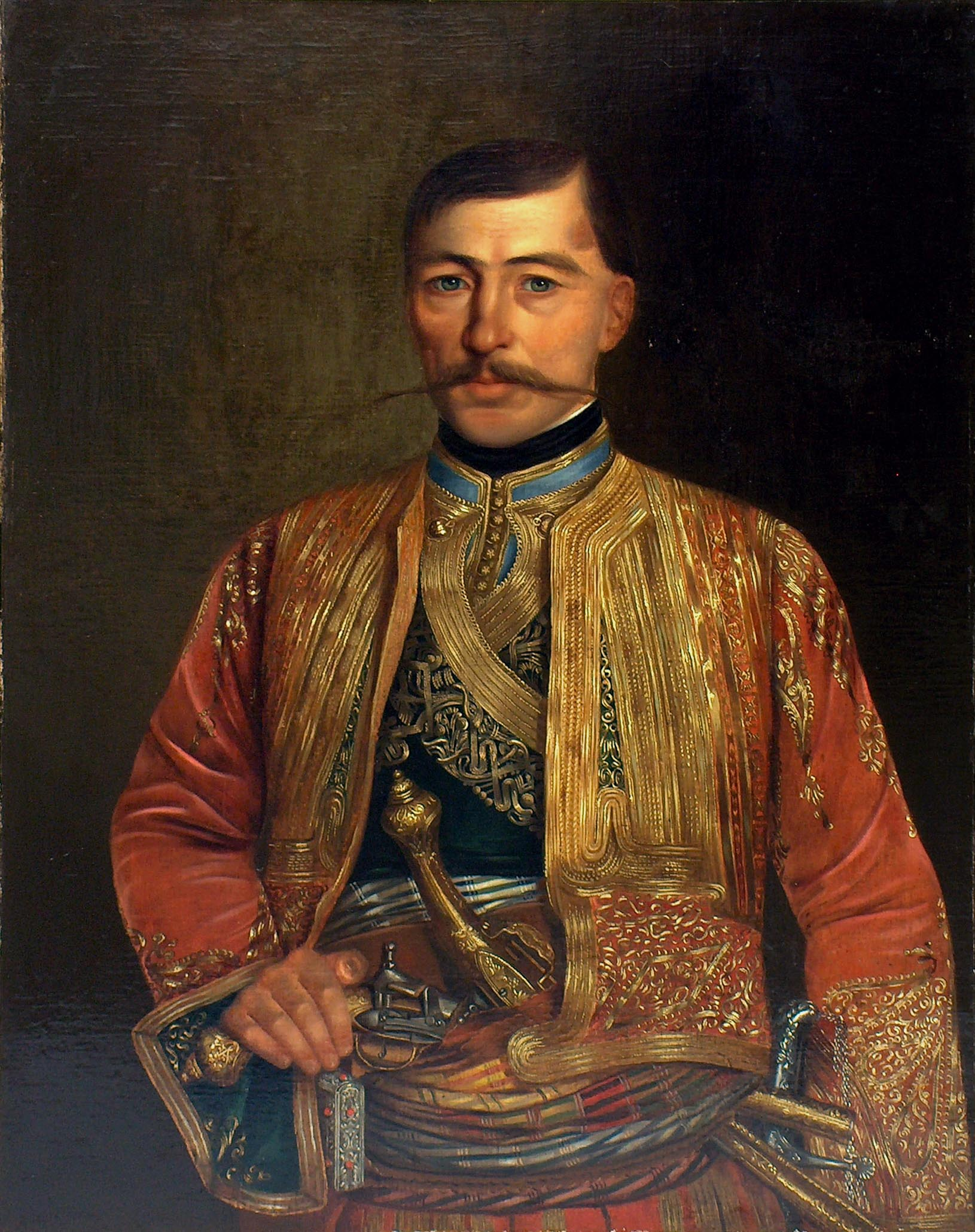
Cincar Janko Popović, one of the leaders of the First Serbian Uprising

After the Serbian–Ottoman War (1876–78) and the suppressed Kumanovo Uprising, the Ottomans retaliated against the Serb population in the Ottoman Empire. Because of the terror against the unprotected rayah (lower class, Christians), many left for the mountains, fled across the border into Serbia, from where they raided their home regions in order to revenge the atrocities carried out by the Ottomans. After the war, the Serbian military government sent armament and aid to rebels in Kosovo and Macedonia. Christian rebel bands were formed all over the region. Many of those bands, privately organized and aided by the government, were established in Serbia and crossed into Ottoman territory.

On 15 June 1878, an assembly was held at Zelenikovo, southeast from Skopje, where 5,000 villagers from the nahiye of Veles, Skopje, and Tikveš, requested unification with Serbia from Prince Milan IV. The request came with 800 municipality, church, and monastery seals, as well as 5,000 signatures, fingerprints, and crosses. However, the carrier delivering the message was intercepted on 16 June on the Skopje-Kumanovo road, by an Ottoman gendarmerie that had been tipped off by a Bulgarian teacher. There was a shootout, and when the carrier's bullets had run out, he ripped and swallowed some of the papers before being shot. Most of the petition was destroyed; however, 600 signatures were identified, and 200 of the identified signatories were immediately killed, while the rest were imprisoned and died in prison.

A petition sent to the international community following the Congress of Berlin said: "As Serbs of true and pure stock, of the purest and most intrinsically Serbian country... We, for the last time, implore on our knees... That we may in some manner and by some means be freed from the slavery of five centuries, and united with our country, the Principality of Serbia, and that the tears of blood of the Serbian martyrs may be stanched so that they, too, may become useful members of the European community of nations and of the Christian world; we do not desire to exchange the harsh Turkish slavery for the vastly harsher and darker Bulgarian slavery, which will be worse and more intolerable than that of the Turks which we are at present enduring, and will compel us in the end either to slay all our own people, or to abandon our country, to abandon our holy places, and graves, and all that we hold dear..."

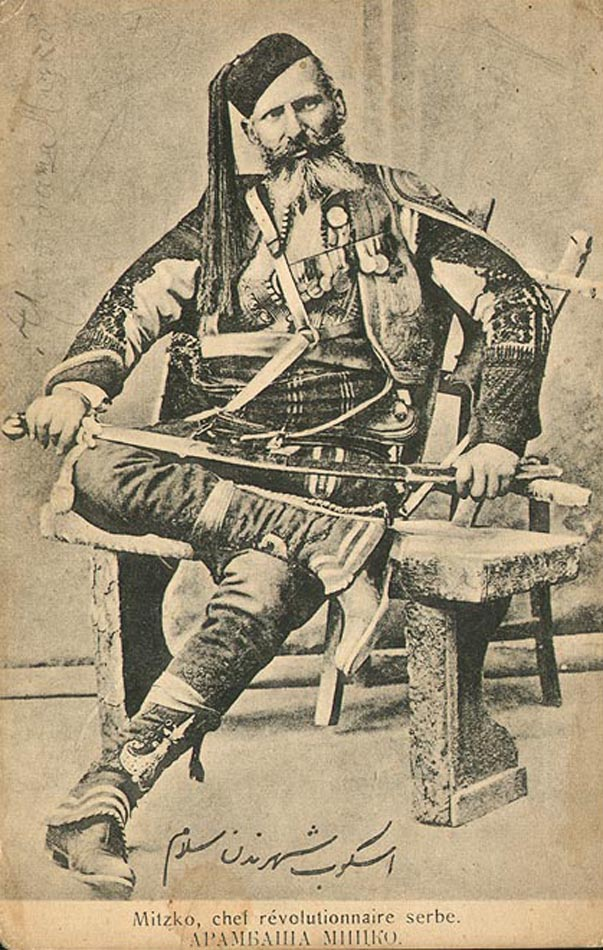
Micko Krstić, Macedonian Serb rebel and military leader, participant in Serbian–Ottoman War and Kumanovo Uprising

In the beginning of 1880, some 65 rebel leaders (glavari), from almost all provinces in southern Old Serbia and Macedonia, sent an appeal to Miloš Milojević, the former commander of volunteers in the Serbian-Ottoman War (1876–78), asking him to, after requesting that from the Serbian government, prepare 1,000 rifles and ammunition for them, and that Milojević be appointed the commander of the rebels and that they be allowed to cross the border and start the rebellion. The leaders were among the most influential in the districts of Kumanovo, Kriva Palanka, Kočani, Štip, Veles, Prilep, Bitola, Ohrid, Kičevo, and Skopje. The appeal was signed by Spiro Crne, Mihajlo Čakre, Dime Ristić-Šiće, Mladen Stojanović "Čakr-paša", Čerkez Ilija, Davče Trajković, and 59 other rebels and former volunteers in the Serbian army. The reply from the Serbian government remains unknown; it is possible that it did not reply at all. From these intentions, only in the Poreče region, an ethnically uniform compact province, a larger result was achieved. There the whole villages turned on against the Ottomans. Viewed of as a continuation of the Kumanovo Uprising, the Brsjak Revolt began on 14 October 1880, and broke out in the nahiya of Kičevo, Poreče, Bitola, and Prilep. The movement was active for little more than a year, finally being suppressed by the Ottoman jandarma (gendarmerie).

Most schools in Macedonia had disappeared by the time of the Serbo-Turkish War (1876–78). In mid-1890s, it was claimed that there were around 100 Serbian schools in Macedonia, though attendance was low. A school was opened in Skopje in 1892, but soon closed after Bulgarians complained that the required city quarters were lacking, the same happened in Kumanovo. Two new schools opened in 1893 and by 1896 the Serbian influence reached its peak but had declined by the start of the 20th century. On August 5, 1898, Dimitar Grdanov, a Serbian teacher in Ohrid, and pro-Serbian activist in Macedonia, was murdered by Metody Patchev, after which Patchev and his fellow conspirators Hristo Uzunov, Cyril Parlichev, and Ivan Grupchev were arrested. These were members of the pro-Bulgarian Internal Macedonian Revolutionary Organization (IMRO).

=== Macedonian Struggle and Balkan Wars ===
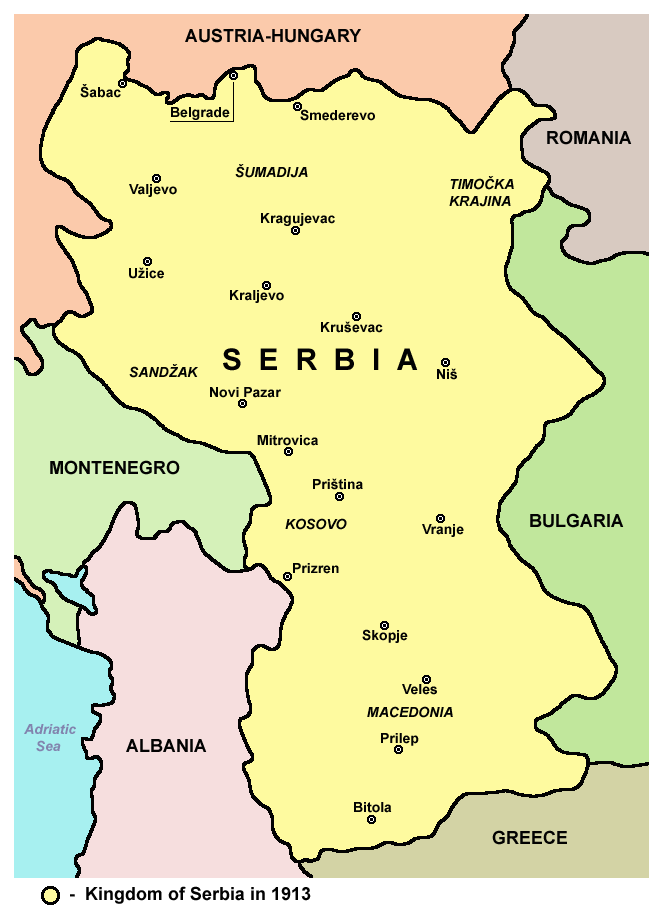
Kingdom of Serbia in 1913

At the end of the 19th century, the liberated Balkan countries started propaganda and cultural activities towards the Christian population in European Turkey. There was a conflict between the Bulgarian Exarchate and Ecumenical Patriarchate in Macedonia, where Bulgarians supported the former and Serbs and Greeks the latter. In 1886, the Society of Saint Sava was established, which aimed to aid the Serbian cause in Macedonia. Serbian consulates were opened in Skopje in 1887, Pristina in 1889, Bitola in 1889, and Prizren in 1896. In the 1900s, armed guerrilla bands in Macedonia were organized according to ethnic identity; Bulgarians (IMRO), Greeks (Macedonian Committee), and Serbs (Chetniks). These groups fought for influence in the region of Macedonia. The Chetniks fought smaller battles against Ottoman gendarmeries, Albanian irregulars and the IMRO.

The Young Turk Revolution in 1908 created slightly better conditions for the expression of Serbian cultural life in Macedonia. Serbian publishing of books, religious calendars, newspapers briefly flourished. The Serb Democratic League was a Serb minority organization in the Ottoman Empire established in 1908 following the Revolution, which included several leading members from what is today North Macedonia, such as Vasa Jovanović. Serbs received deputies in the Ottoman parliament. The League demanded for the Serbs, Greeks and Bulgarians to receive an equal number of seats in the Ottoman parliament, which was refused. In 1910 the League complained to the Turkish authorities regarding bashi-bazouk (irregular army) terror against the Christian population in parts of the Kosovo Vilayet. During the First Balkan War, Serbia occupied most of modern-day North Macedonia, much at the grievance of Bulgaria. The period from 1913 to 1914 was a period of turmoil, and the central government in Belgrade implemented plenty of unpopular measures.

=== Yugoslavia ===
When Bulgaria invaded southern Serbia during World War I, it regarded all who celebrated the slava as Serbs and enemies, as Bulgarians do not have that custom. For instance, when Bulgarian commander Aleksandar Protogerov was ordered to inflict reprisals in the east of Kumanovo for an earlier attack, and the population quickly declared as Bulgarians before the measures were taken (as to avoid punishment), his aides had the idea of asking the people who celebrated the slava; those who did were shot.

At the 1919 Paris Peace Conference, the Allies approved Serbian control of Vardar Macedonia, claiming that the Macedonian Slavs were Southern Serbs. After the creation of the Kingdom of Serbs, Croats and Slovenes, the territory of what is today North Macedonia, Kosovo, southwestern and southeastern Serbia was administratively organized into South Serbia. Although reorganized in 1922, the term continued to be used for the new administrative divisions, the Vardar Banovina and Zeta Banovina.

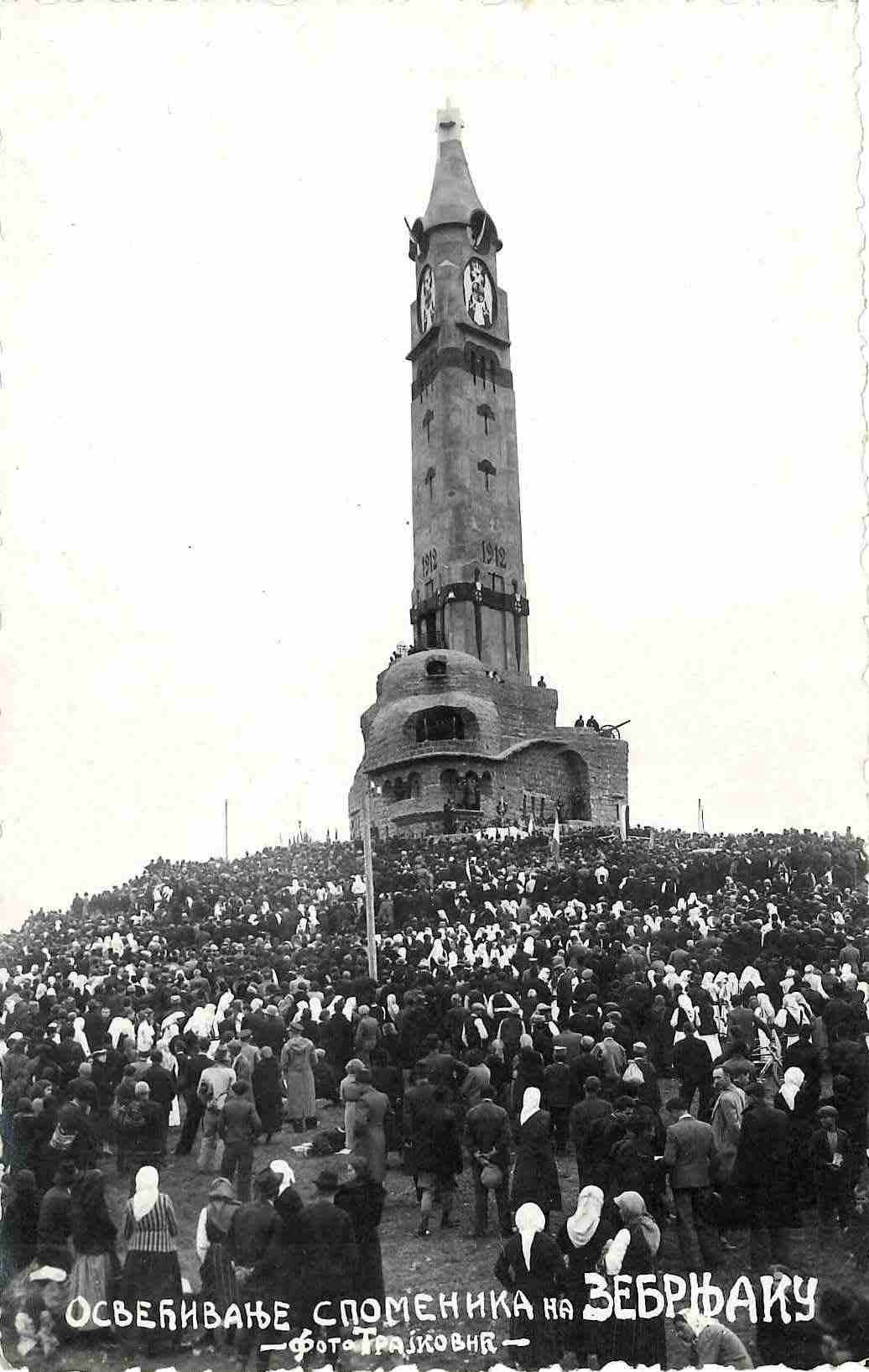
Inauguration of the Zebrnjak Mausoleum, 1937

During the World War II, the IMRO deported Macedonian Serbs; the Serb community of Veles faced massive deportations, of the 25,000 Serbs of Skopje only 2,000 remained by the beginning of 1942. The IMRO was active in the deportation and punitive expeditions against ethnic Serbs.

Some 120,000 Serbs were forced to emigrate to Serbia by the Yugoslav Communists after they had opted for Serbian citizenship in 1944. The population of Serbs in Macedonia which did not lend itself to Tito's Macedonianization, representing compact populations in the region of Kumanovo and parts of Skopska Crna Gora was separated from the Socialist Republic of Serbia. In 1945, after the liberation from the occupying forces, the requests to become a part of the newly formed federal unit of Serbia came from some regions of Macedonia in spite of the terror of the new Macedonian government. The typical example was the plea of the rural population in the Vratnica municipality. In a letter to the minister for Serbia in the Government of the Democratic Federal Yugoslavia the inhabitants of these villages stated: We, the Serbs from the Vratnica municipality have never felt otherwise but as Serbs, the same as our ancestors, and it has been so for centuries. Because of that we suffered extremely during the occupation both in the last World War and in this one that ended recently. During the occupation in this war, 41 Serbs were executed by firing squads, some were Interned and there was not a single Serb between the age of 15 and 66 that was not beaten and molested to exhaustion. The inhabitants in the Vratnica municipality also complained about the new Macedonian officials and listed the main reasons such as: In our district the administrative authorities are mostly constituted of the persons who were Fascist collaborators, the persons who welcomed the German army with delight, the persons who held religious service of thanksgiving when the German armada was victorious though the Germans never requested such things from the city dwellers. Even an example is given: during the occupation the village representative in the Vratnica municipality was Andra Hristov from Tetovo (in the Kingdom of Yugoslavia he was a clerk in the Tetovo district court, but then his surname was Serbian - Ristić), who is now said to be ...an official of the people's administration authorities in Skopje.

The post-war years were characterized by the loss of Serb pan-national institutions in the territory of today's North Macedonia like the proclamation of the non-recognized Macedonian Orthodox Church in 1967. Several Serbian Orthodox monasteries have been seized by the newly-established church, however in the regions with prevailing numbers of Serbs (Serb-majority villages around Kumanovo and in Skopska Crna Gora), the Serbian Orthodox Church was still exercising its pastoral activities.

In 1991, shortly after the start of the Yugoslav Wars, Republic of Macedonia held a referendum on independence from Yugoslavia. The referendum question read: "Are you for a sovereign and independent state of Macedonia, with a right to enter into any future alliance with the sovereign states of Yugoslavia?" It was approved by 96% of voters, with a turnout of 76%; most ethnic Albanians, although in favour of Macedonian independence, boycotted the referendum because they opposed the latter part of the question, as they were wary of Serbian political dominance in a future Yugoslavia of any form. The anniversary of the referendum, on 8 September, is celebrated as the Independence Day in North Macedonia.

=== Contemporary period ===
In 1992, Serbs of Kumanovo organized themselves in associations and political parties and held demonstrations in support of the Serbian cause in Bosnia and Herzegovina and Croatia. The Serbian Radical Party sympathizers in Macedonia made an effort to establish a "Serbian Autonomous Region of Kumanovo Valley and Skopska Crna Gora" or "Karadag Republic". In 1993, around 500 Serbs gathered in the village of Kučevište, in Skopska Crna Gora, to protest the police repression against ethnic Serbs on New Year's Eve when 13 Serbian youths were injured. Macedonian Serbs asserted they were mistreated by Macedonian authorities.

== Demographics ==
According to data from the 2021 census, 23,847 people in North Macedonia identified as ethnic Serbs and 11,252 declared their mother tongue as Serbian.

The Serbs of North Macedonia are mostly concentrated in the northern part of the country: in the Greater Skopje region (where over half of Serbs in the country live) as well as along the border with Serbia, in Kumanovo region (municipalities of Kumanovo and Staro Nagoričane). Besides the northern part of the country, there is a certain concentration in the southernmost part of the country, in wider area around Dojran Lake (municipalities of Dojran, Bogdanci, and Valandovo) and in mid-Vardar Valley (municipalities of Negotino, Rosoman, and Demir Kapija). Serbs in Kumanovo region and in Skopska Crna Gora (Čučer Sandevo municipality) are the autochthonous population, while in the southern and southeastern parts of Macedonia ethnic Serb population is primarily consisted of descendants of Serb colonists who settled there after the World War I.

Share of Serbs in Macedonia by municipalities, 2021

Municipality	Population	Share
City of Skopje	9,478	1.8%
Kumanovo	6,392	6.5%
Čučer-Sandevo	1,932	21%
Ilinden	628	3.6%
Staro Nagoričane	585	16.7%
Valandovo	469	4.4%
Negotino	344	1.9%
Bogdanci	275	3.7%
Rosoman	253	6.6%
Dojran	152	4.9%
Demir Kapija	130	3.4%

List of settlements with Serb ethnic majority/plurality or significant part of population (in italic):

Settlements	Municipality	Population
Staro Nagoričane	Staro Nagoričane	302
Rečica	Kumanovo	300
Selemli	Bogdanci	191
Novo Selo	Kumanovo	182
Nikuljane	Staro Nagoričane	96
Četirce	Kumanovo	94
Karabičane	Kumanovo	13
Miglence	Staro Nagoričane	6
Suševo	Kumanovo	5
Tabanovce	Kumanovo	294
Marvinci	Valandovo	215
Algunja	Staro Nagoričane	136
Čučer-Sandevo	Čučer-Sandevo	134
Kučevište	Čučer-Sandevo	1,323
Tromegja	Kumanovo	389
Gorno Konjare	Kumanovo	134

== Politics ==
The National Council of Serb Ethnic Minority in North Macedonia is a representation body of Serbs, established for the protection of the rights and the minority self-government of Serbs in North Macedonia.

The Democratic Party of Serbs in Macedonia is the ethnic minority party representing interests of Serbs in North Macedonia.

== Notable people ==
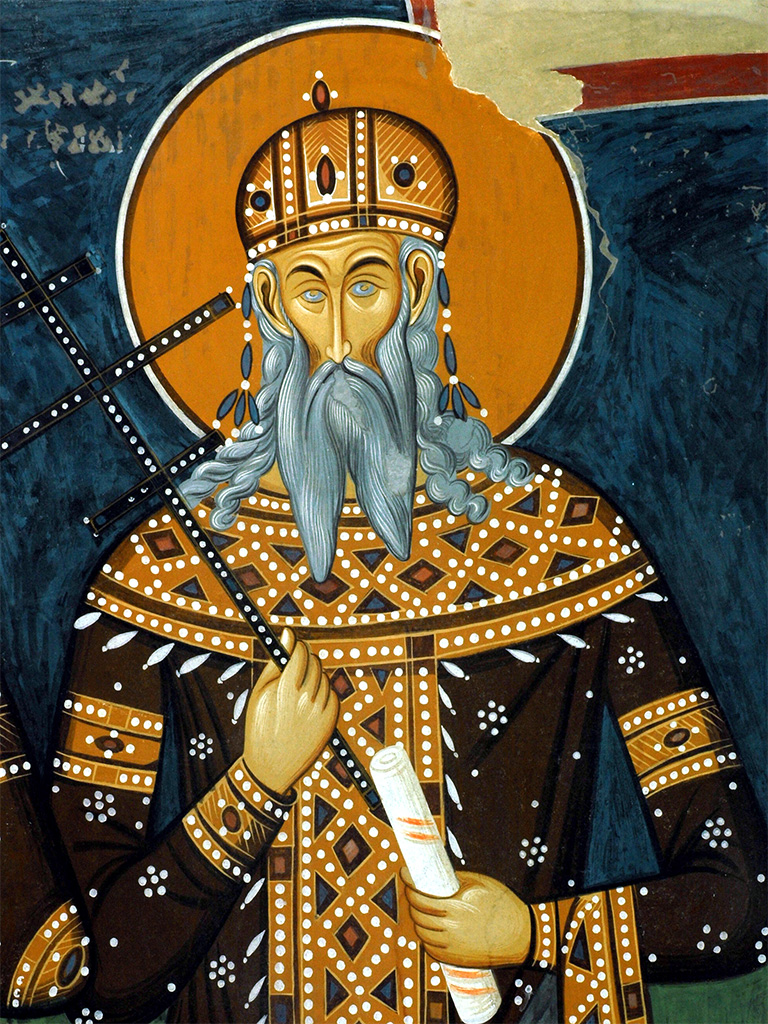
King Vukašin

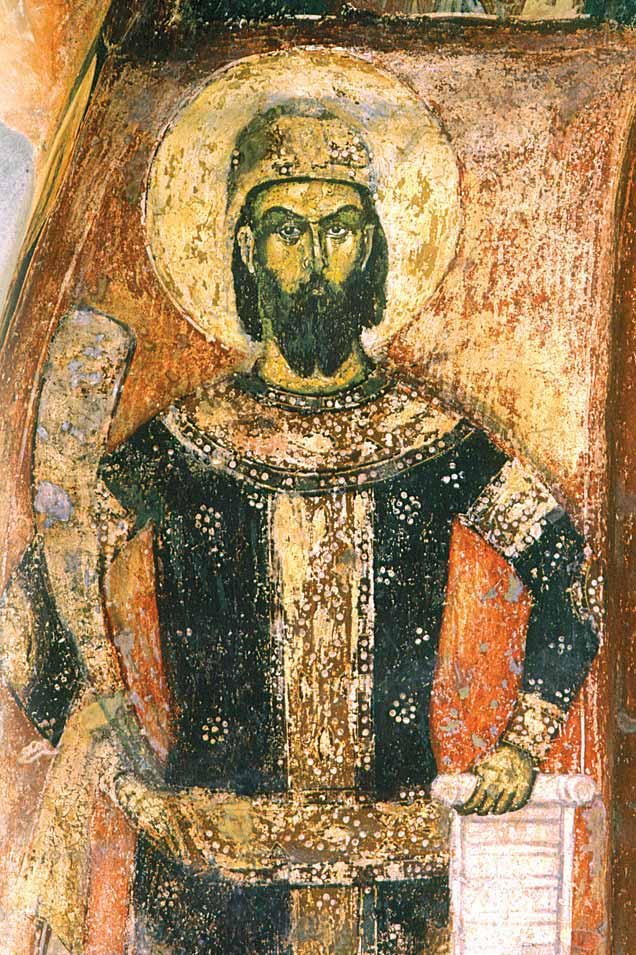
Prince Marko

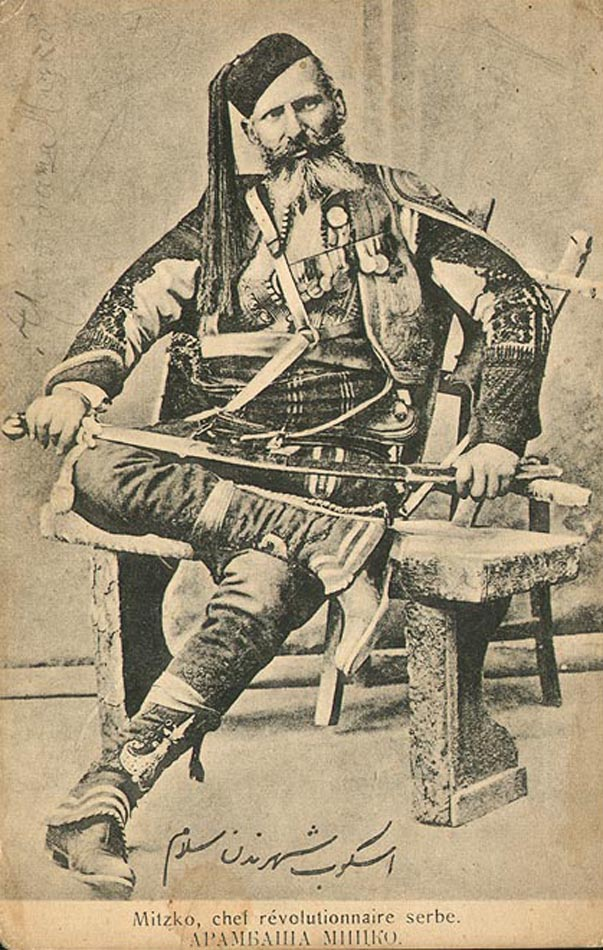
Micko Krstić

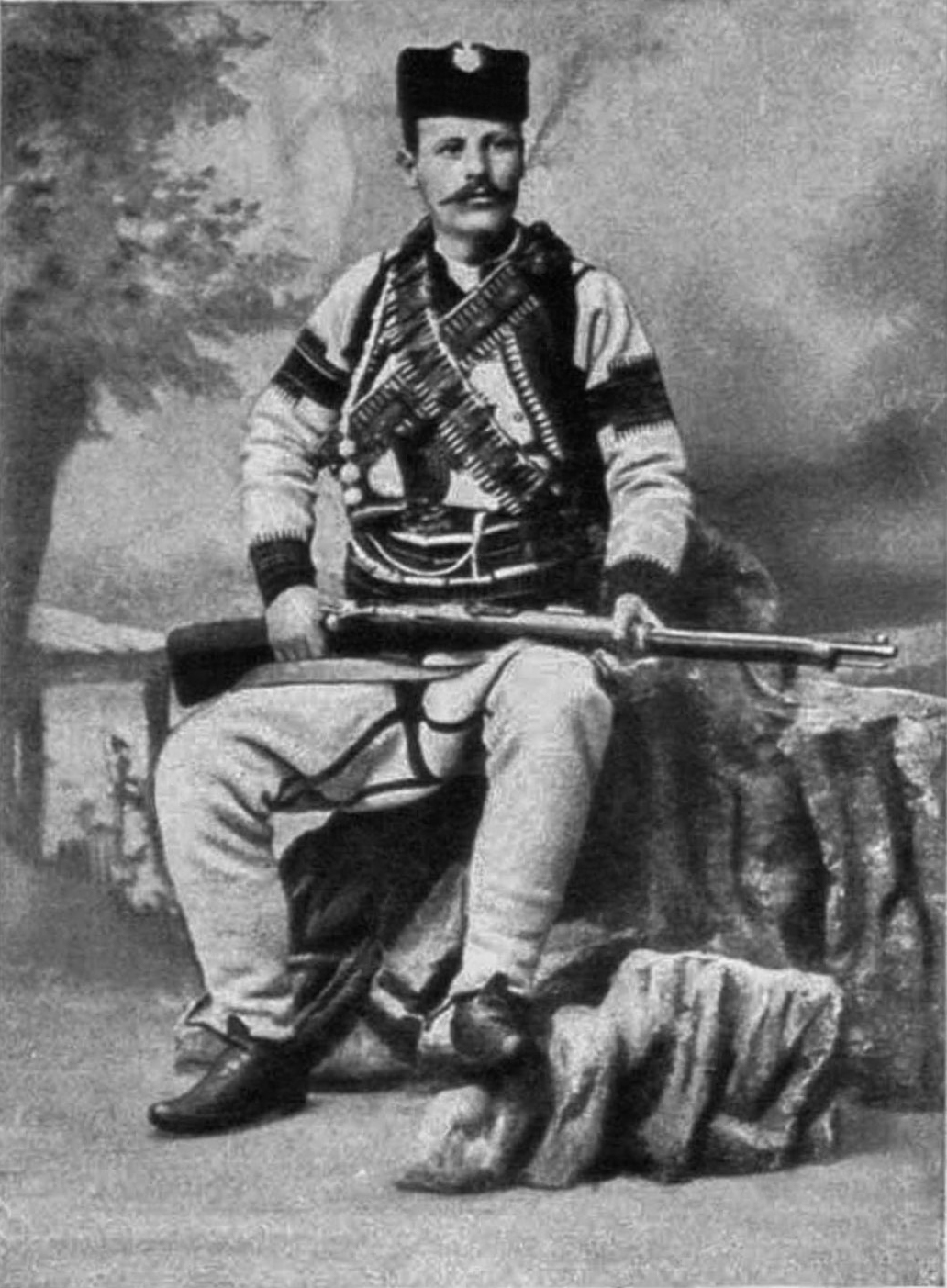
Jovan Babunski

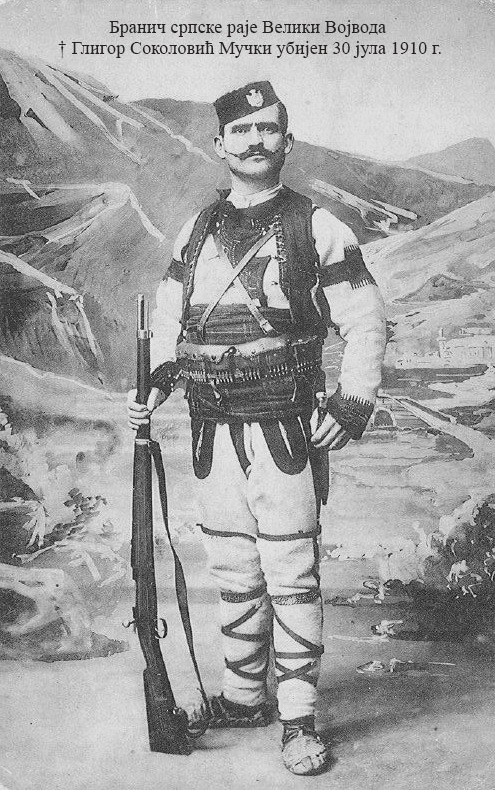
Gligor Sokolović

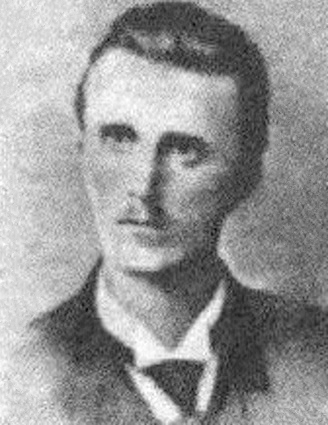
Kosta Abrašević

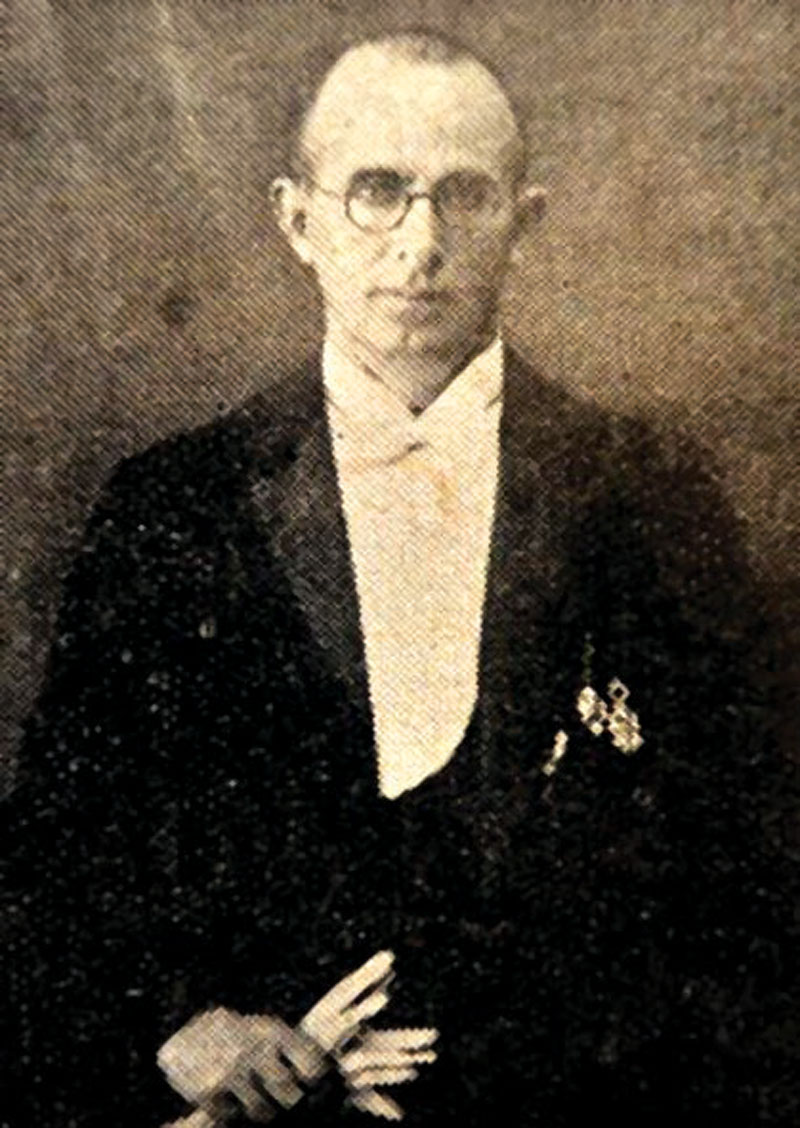
Josif M. Jurukovski

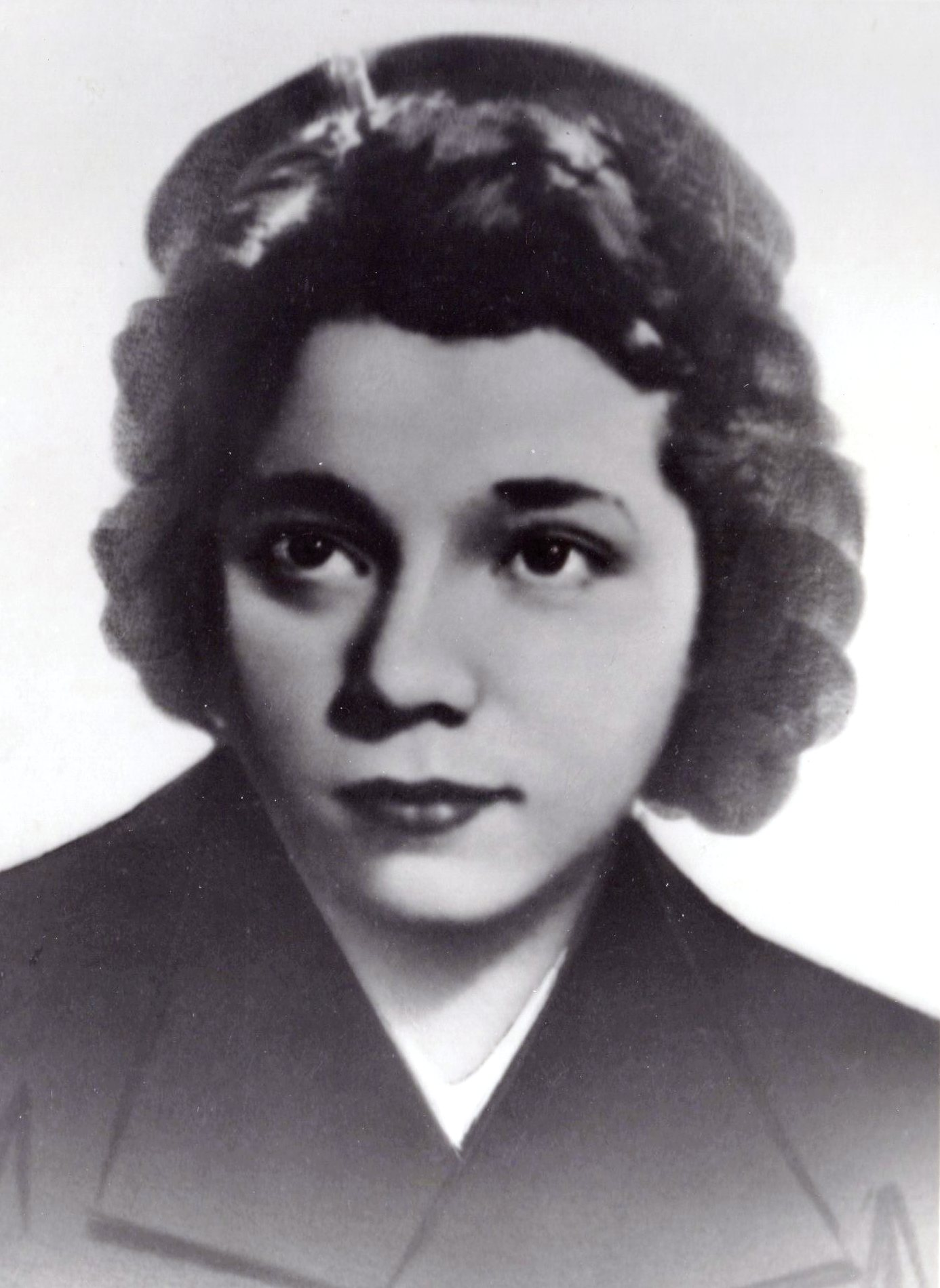
Vera Jocić

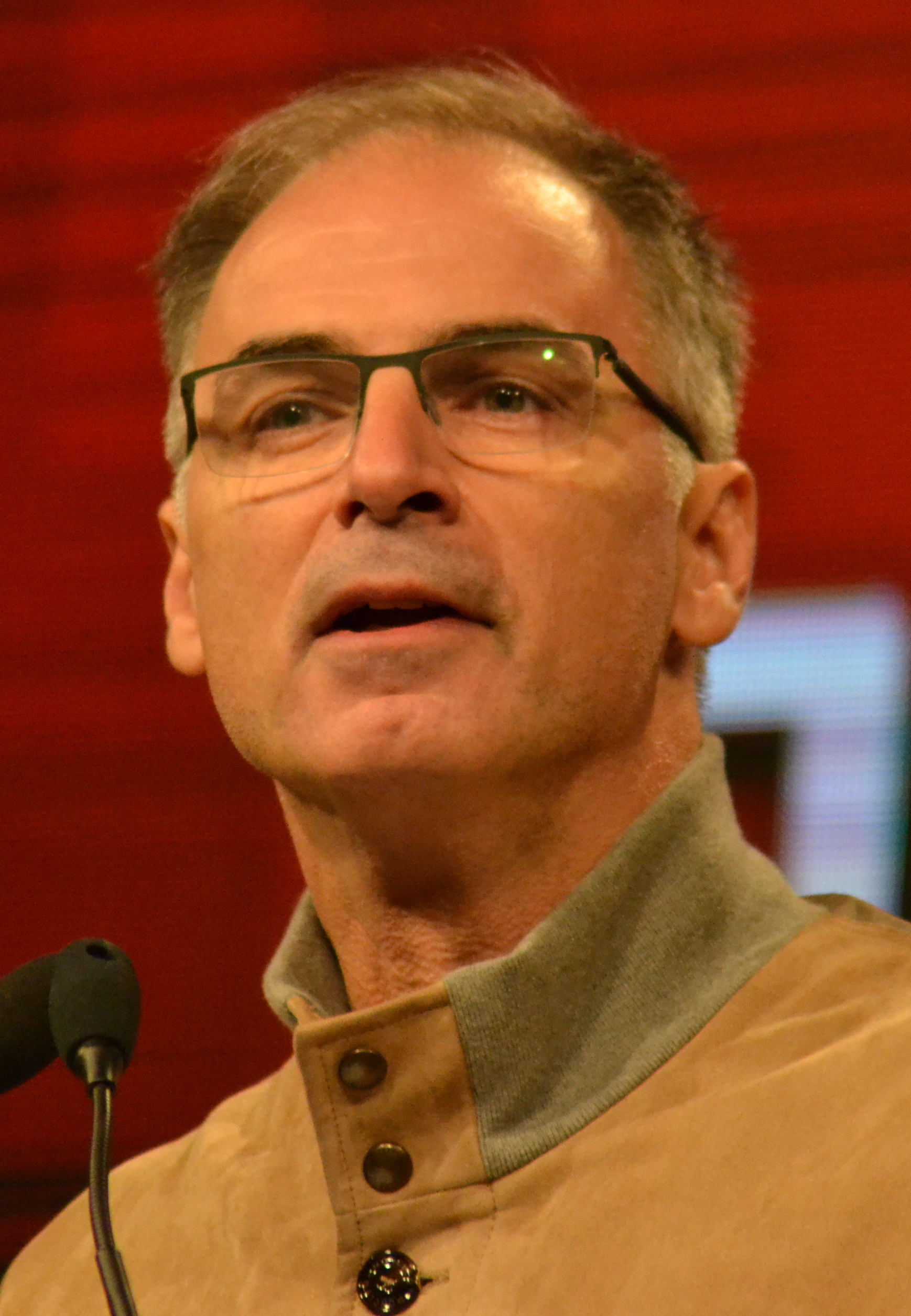
Ivan Stoilković

- Kosta Abrašević – poet
- Atanasije – Serbian Patriarch
- Dragoslav Avramović – economist
- Jovan Babunski – Chetnik guerrilla fighter
- Despot Badžović – activist
- Saša Ćirić – football player
- Mara Đorđević – singer
- Dragomir Felba – actor
- Spasa Garda – Chetnik guerrilla fighter
- Golub Janić – merchant, activist and philanthropist
- Vera Jocić – Yugoslav Partisan
- Vasa Jovanović – founder of the Chetnik movement
- Josif Mihailović Jurukovski – architect and politician
- Anđelko Krstić – writer
- Denko Krstić – merchant, activist and philanthropist
- Micko Krstić – Chetnik guerrilla fighter
- Cincar-Marko Kostić – voivode in the First Serbian Uprising
- Barbara Popović – singer
- Cincar-Janko Popović – voivode in the First Serbian Uprising
- Maksim I – Serbian Patriarch
- Vesna Milošević – handball player
- Nataša Petrović – actress
- Prince Marko - medieval nobleman
- Gligor Sokolović – Chetnik guerrilla fighter
- Mladen Srbinović – painter
- Vujadin Stanojković – football player
- Traian Stoianovich – historian
- Ivan Stoilković – politician
- Blagoje Vidinić – football player
- Dragan Vučić – composer
- Martin Vučić – singer
- King Vukašin – medieval king

== See also ==
- North Macedonia–Serbia relations

== Sources ==
- Bataković, Dušan T., ed. (2005). Histoire du peuple serbe [History of the Serbian People] (in French). Lausanne: L'Age d'Homme. ISBN 978-2-8251-1958-7.
- Fine, John Van Antwerp (1991). The Early Medieval Balkans: A Critical Survey from the Sixth to the Late Twelfth Century. Michigan: The University of Michigan Press. ISBN 0-472-08149-7.
- Fine, John Van Antwerp (1994), The Late Medieval Balkans: A Critical Survey from the Late Twelfth Century to the Ottoman Conquest, Ann Arbor: University of Michigan Press, ISBN 978-0-472-08260-5
- Станислав Станковић. О аутохтоним српским народним говорима на тлу Републике Македоније (PDF). Теренска истраживања – поетика сусрета: 153–166. Archived from the original (PDF) on 18 March 2014.
- Slavenko Terzić (1995). "The Serbs and the Macedonian Question" (Internet ed.). Belgrade: University of Belgrade, Faculty of Geography.
- Srbi u Makedoniji i u južnoj staroj Srbiji. Štamparija Kraljevine Srbije. 1888.
- Ljubiša Doklestić (1964). Kroz historiju Makedonije: izabrani izvori. Školska knj.
- Đorđević, Dimitrije (1965). Révolutions des peuples balkaniques (in Serbian). Graficko preduzece Novi dani.
- Đurić, Veljko Đ.; Mijović, Miličko (1993). Ilustrovana istorija četničkog pokreta (in Serbian).
- Georgevitch, T. R. (2018) [1918]. Macedonia. Forgotten Books. ISBN 978-1-4400-6519-4.
- Hadži-Vasiljević, Jovan (1928). Četnička akcija u Staroj Srbiji i Maćedoniji (in Serbian). Belgrade: Sv. Sava.
- Institut za savremenu istoriju (2007). Gerila na Balkanu. Tokyo: Institute for Disarmament and Peace Studies.
- Jovanović, Aleksa (1937). Spomenica dvadesetogodišnjice oslobodjenja Južne Srbije, 1912-1937 (in Serbian). Južna Srbija.
- "Serbia's policy towards Bulgaria and the secret convention from 1881" (PDF). Istorija. 71–72. Matica srpska: 29–.
- Radić Prvoslav (2002). "From the history of Serbian question in Macedonia: Culturological aspect". Balcanica (32–33): 227–252. doi:10.2298/BALC0233227R.
- Ćirković, Sima (2004). The Serbs. Malden: Blackwell Publishing. ISBN 978-1-4051-4291-5.
