= Democratic Party of Serbs in Macedonia =

Serb minority political party in North Macedonia

Democratic Party of Serbs in Macedonia Демократска партија Срба у Македонији Демократска партија на Србите во Македонија
- Leader: Ivan Stoilković
- Founded: 1992
- Headquarters: Skopje
- Ideology: Serb minority politics
- Political position: Centre-right
- National affiliation: Your Macedonia
- Colours: Red, Blue, White (Colours of the Serbian flag)
- Parliament: 1 / 120

Website
- http://www.dpsm.info/

The Democratic Party of Serbs in Macedonia (DPSM; Serbian: Демократска странка Срба у Македонији, romanized: Demokratska stranka Srba u Makedoniji; Macedonian: Демократска партија на Србите во Македонија, romanized: Demokratska partija na Srbite vo Makedonija) is a political party representing the interests of Serbs in North Macedonia.

== Overview ==
DPSM's elected member of parliament is Ivan Stoilković who is also the party president. Stoilković was appointed government minister in the cabinet of Hristijan Mickoski in 2024.

The party goals may be defined as: preservation and advancement of Serbs and their respective culture and heritage by legal implementation and practical projects and support for the development of North Macedonia as a multiethnic, free-market orientated democracy. It has traditional base of members and supporters in the regions inhabited by ethnic Serbs: Skopska Crna Gora (Čučer-Sandevo Municipality) and wider Kumanovo region (municipalities of Kumanovo and Staro Nagoričane); among Serbs in the capital city of Skopje; and among other communities of Serbs in other areas of North Macedonia.

From the inception of political pluralism in the North Macedonia, it is by far the most representative political option for Serbs. Since 2001 its preferred political partner is VMRO-DPMNE, current ruling party.

== See also ==
- Serbs of North Macedonia
