= Kosta Abrašević =

Serbian poet (1879–1898)

- Коста Абрашевић
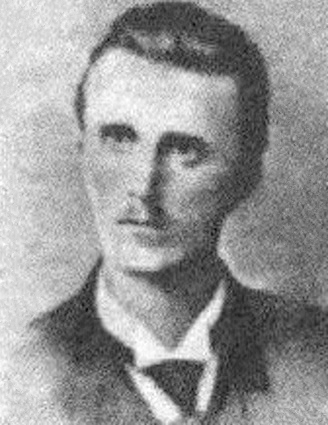
- Portrait of Abrašević
- Born: 29 May 1879; Ohrid, Ottoman Empire
- Died: 20 January 1898 (aged 18); Šabac, Kingdom of Serbia
- Occupation: poet

Kosta Abrašević or Kosta Abraš (Serbian Cyrillic: Коста Абрашевић; 29 May 1879 – 20 January 1898) was a Serbian poet, progenitor of proletarian poetry in Serbian literature.

== Life ==
Kosta Hristić was born in Ohrid in the Manastir Vilayet of the Ottoman Empire (in present-day North Macedonia) on 29 May 1879 to a poor merchant family. His father, Naum Hristić, was Serb and his mother Sotira was Greek.

After finishing three years in a Greek school in Ohrid, he continued his schooling at a gymnasium (high school) in Šabac, where he started using the patronymic of his father's nickname "Abraš" as a surname. Early on in his life he came in contact with Socialist ideas, and founded a political-writer group in Šabac, which published magazines Omirov venac and Grbonja. In his poetry social ideas are prevalent. This could be seen in his poem Red, where the expression "Ruby-red" is associated with blood and "Mighty veins," "lighting" and "dark eyes" all showed the inevitable triumph of the workers and the crushing defeat of tyrants (Turks). He translated German Socialist poets. His original poems are found in socialist magazines after his death, and his collection, which had seen many editions, was printed by high school and college student groups in 1903. His works are translated into Russian, Hungarian, Albanian and Romanian, also some of his works are interpreted by composers such as S. Anđelić and M. Živković. He died in Šabac on 20 January 1898 from tuberculosis at the age of 18.

Today many cultural and artistic societies throughout Serbia and Bosnia and Herzegovina carry his name. He remains a forgotten figure in Serbian poetry, although many critics consider his poems to be significant for the poetic emergence in the ranks of the former Yugoslav proletariat. The poems of Kosta Abrasević reflect strong dissatisfaction and rebellion against the then-position of the dominant and privileged class—the Turk—and thus are paradoxically and prematurely identified as proletarian and socialist. Kosta Abrasević died too young to make a significant mark in literature.

== Sources ==
- M. Милојковић (1951). Коста Абрашевић. Живот и рад, Београд.
