= Bogdanci Municipality =

Municipality of North Macedonia

Coordinates: 41.23°N 22.56°E

Bogdanci Municipality Општина Богданци
- Urban municipality
- Flag Coat of arms

- Country: North Macedonia
- Region: Southeastern
- Municipal seat: Bogdanci

Government
  - Mayor: Blaže Šapov (SDSM)

Population
  - Total: 7,339
- Time zone: UTC+1 (CET)
- Vehicle registration: GE
- Website: www.bogdanci.gov.mk

Bogdanci (Macedonian: Богданци [ˈbɔɡdantsi]) is a municipality in the southern part of North Macedonia. Bogdanci is also the name of the town where the municipal seat is found. Bogdanci Municipality is part of Southeastern Statistical Region.

== Geography ==
The municipality borders Dojran Municipality to the east, Valandovo Municipality to the north, Gevgelija Municipality to the west, and Greece to the south.

== Demographics ==
According to the 2021 North Macedonia census, this municipality has 7,339 inhabitants. Ethnic groups in the municipality include:

	2002		2021	
	Number	%	Number	%
TOTAL	8,707	100	7,339	100
Macedonians	8,093	93.95	6,665	90.82
Serbs	525	6.03	275	3.75
Turks	54	0.62	38	0.52
Roma	1	0.01	12	0.16
Vlachs	5	0.05	4	0.04
Albanians	2	0.02	1	0.01
Bosniaks			1	0.01
Other / Undeclared / Unknown	27	0.32	48	0.67
Persons for whom data are taken from administrative sources			295	4.02
