= Valandovo Municipality =

Municipality of North Macedonia

Coordinates: 41.3167°N 22.55°E

Valandovo Municipality Општина Валандово
- Urban municipality
- Flag Coat of arms

- Country: North Macedonia
- Region: Southeastern
- Municipal seat: Valandovo

Government
  - Mayor: Pero Kostadinov (SDSM)

Area
  - Total: 331.4 km^{2} (128.0 sq mi)

Population
  - Total: 10,580
- Time zone: UTC+1 (CET)
- Vehicle registration: VA
- Website: http://www.valandovo.gov.mk/

Valandovo (Macedonian: Валандово [vaˈɫandɔvɔ]) is a municipality in the southern part of North Macedonia. Valandovo is also the name of the town where the municipal seat is found. Valandovo Municipality is part of Southeastern Statistical Region.

== Geography ==
The municipality borders Demir Kapija Municipality to the northwest, Konče Municipality to the north, Strumica Municipality to the northeast, Greece to the east, Dojran Municipality and Bogdanci Municipality to the south, and Gevgelija Municipality to the southwest.

== Demographics ==
According to the 2021 North Macedonia census, this municipality has 10,580 inhabitants. Ethnic groups in the municipality include:

	2002		2021	
	Number	%	Number	%
TOTAL	11,890	100	10,508	100
Macedonians	9,830	82.67	8,166	77.71
Turks	1,333	11.21	1,412	13.44
Serbs	639	5.37	469	4.46
Roma	32	0.27	24	0.23
Albanians			10	0.1
Bosniaks	1	0.01	4	0.04
Vlachs	1	0.01		
Other / Undeclared / Unknown	54	0.46	59	0.56
Persons for whom data are taken from administrative sources			364	3.46
