= Dojran Municipality =

Municipality of North Macedonia

Coordinates: 41.18°N 22.73°E

Dojran Municipality Општина Дојран
- Rural municipality
- Flag Coat of arms

- Country: North Macedonia
- Region: Southeastern
- Municipal seat: Star Dojran

Government
  - Mayor: Ilija Tentov (VMRO-DPMNE)

Area
  - Total: 129.16 km^{2} (49.87 sq mi)

Population
  - Total: 3,084
- Time zone: UTC+1 (CET)
- Vehicle registration: GE

Dojran (Macedonian: Дојран [ˈdɔjran]) is a municipality in the southeastern part of North Macedonia. Star Dojran is the village where the municipal seat is found. Dojran Municipality is part of the Southeastern Statistical Region.

== Geography ==
The municipality borders Bogdanci Municipality to the west, Valandovo Municipality to the north, and Greece to the east and south.

== Demographics ==
According to the 2021 North Macedonia census, this municipality has 3,084 inhabitants. Ethnic groups in the municipality include:

	2002		2021	
	Number	%	Number	%
TOTAL	3,426	100	3,084	100
Macedonians	2,641	77.09	2,528	81.97
Turks	402	11.73	211	6.84
Serbs	277	8.09	152	4.93
Roma	59	1.72	30	0.97
Albanians	17	0.5	15	0.49
Vlachs	3	0.09	3	0.09
Bosniaks	2	0.06	1	0.03
Other / Undeclared / Unknown	25	0.72	24	0.79
Persons for whom data are taken from administrative sources			120	3.89
