= 2021 North Macedonian local elections =

← 2017	17 and 31 October 2021	2025 →

80 municipalities and City of Skopje
- Registered: 1,824,864 (First round); 1,353,990 (Second round)
- Turnout: 49,23% ▼ (8,07pp) (First round)
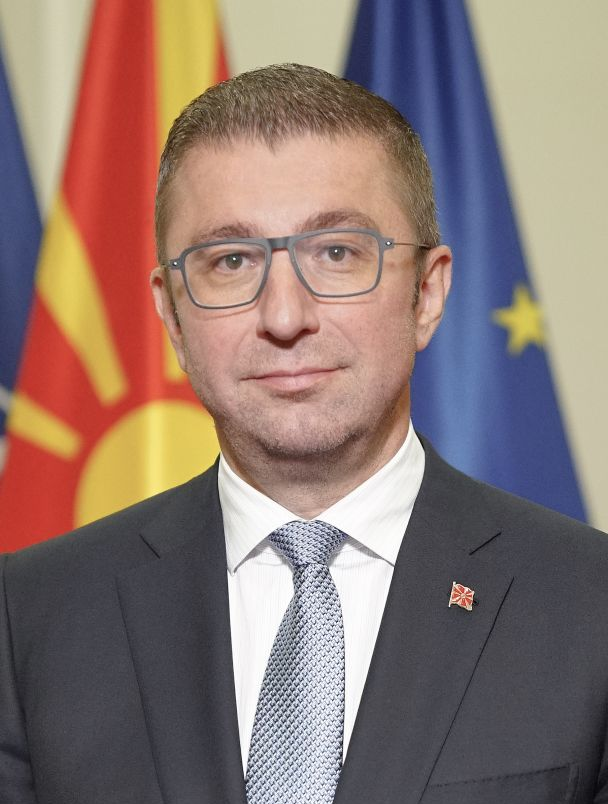

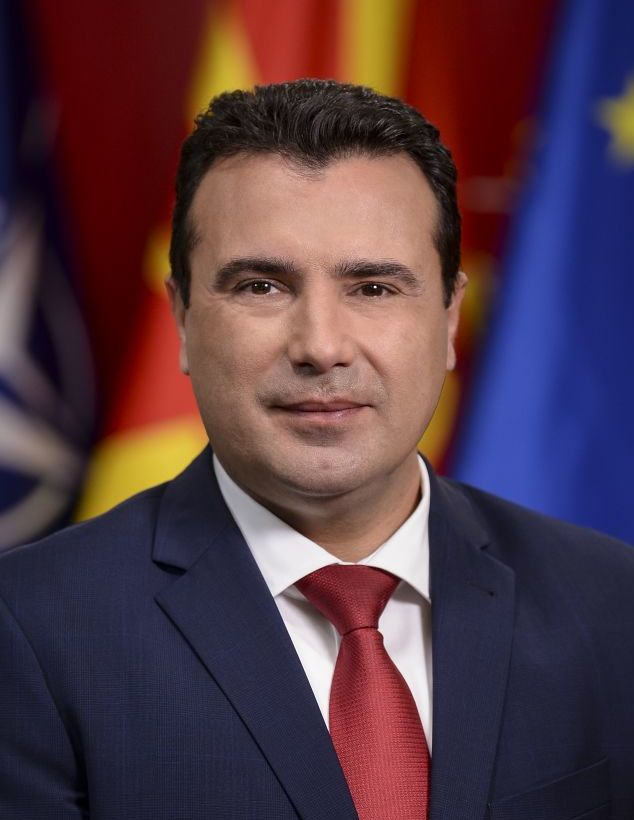

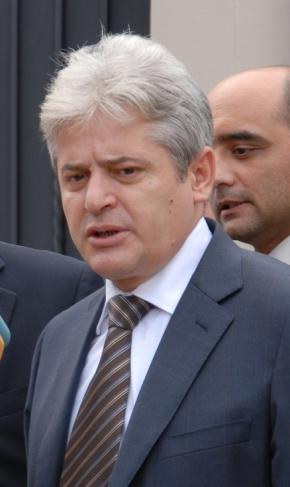

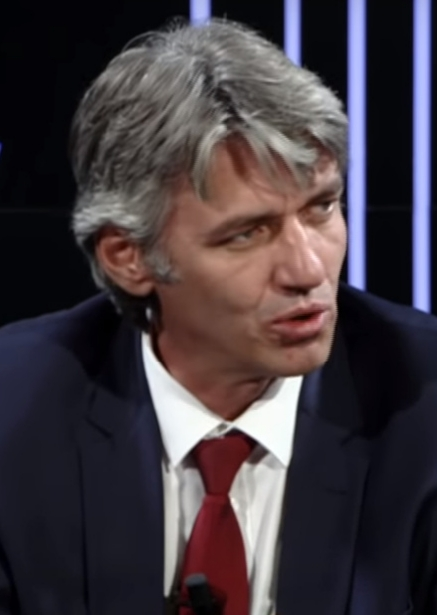

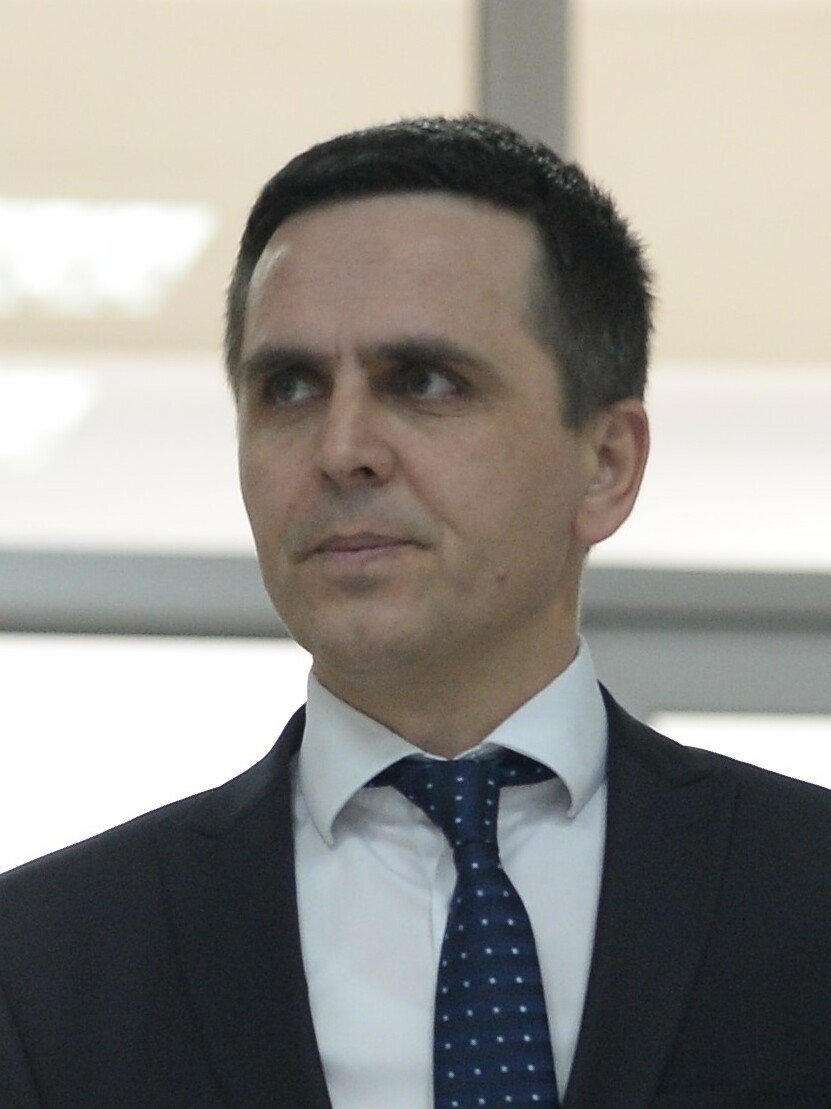

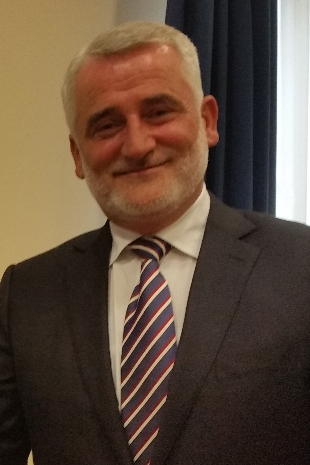
	First party	Second party	Third party
Leader	Hristijan Mickoski	Zoran Zaev	Ali Ahmeti
Party	VMRO-DPMNE	SDSM	BDI
Mayoralities won	42	16	11
Change	▲37	▼41	▲1
	Fourth party	Fifth party	Sixth party
Leader	Ziadin Sela	Bilall Kasami	Menduh Thaçi
Party	ASH	BESA	PDSH
Mayoralities won	2	2	1
Change	▼1	▲1	1
	Seventh party	Eighth party	Ninth party
Leader	—	Stevčo Jakimovski	—
Party	DOM – LDP	GROM	Independents and Others (Note: Democratic Party of Turks (1))
Mayoralities won	1	1	4
Change	▲1	▲1	4

Local elections were held on October 2021 to elect councilors and mayors in 80 municipalities and the City of Skopje in North Macedonia. The first round was held on 17 October, while the second round was held on 31 October. The elections were announced on 6 August 2021 by the Speaker of the Assembly Talat Xhaferi. According to the State Election Commission's calendar, the deadline for submitting candidacies for councilor and mayor lists was 11 September 2021. The election campaign lasted from 27 September to 15 October.

== Background and elections ==
The Speaker of the Assembly Talat Xhaferi on 6 August 2021 scheduled the local elections for 17 October. In the next day, the State Election Commission set a deadline for submitting candidates until 11 September, while it permitted campaigning from 27 September to 15 October. During the election campaigns, Hristijan Mickoski alleged "corruption of the state by Zoran Zaev and his entourage." Women were underrepresented as mayoral candidates, with only 26 candidates being women (less than 9%), out of a total of 298 candidates.

The first round of the elections was held on 17 October. It was the first election in North Macedonia that utilised biometric fingerprint readers for the identification of voters. In the first round, mayors were elected in 34 municipalities. VMRO-DPMNE won in the first round in 22 municipalities, SDSM won in 9, and DUI in 3 municipalities. The second round occurred on 31 October. VMRO-DPMNE won 42 municipalities. Independent candidate Danela Arsovska, supported by VMRO-DPMNE, became the first woman to lead Skopje since the country's independence, winning against SDSM's Petre Šilegov. SDSM won 16 mayor seats, DUI – 13, and Besa – 2, while DPA and LDP-DOM's coalition one each. Apart from Arsovska, three other independent candidates became mayors. DUI's Tetovo mayor Teuta Arifi was defeated by Besa's Bilal Kasami. Alliance for Albanians' Arben Taravari won a new four-year term in Gostivar. In Kumanovo, Maksim Dimitrievski won as an independent candidate, defeating SDSM's Oliver Ilievski.

== Mayoral results ==
Region	Municipality	Elected	Percentage	Party
Eastern Statistical Region	Berovo	Dzvonko Pekevski	51.25%	SDSM
Eastern Statistical Region	Češinovo-Obleševo	Dalibor Angelov	52.93%	VMRO-DPMNE
Eastern Statistical Region	Delčevo	Goran Trajkovski	51.14%	SDSM
Eastern Statistical Region	Karbinci	Viktor Paunov	59.40%	VMRO-DPMNE
Eastern Statistical Region	Kočani	Ljubčo Papazov	48.29%	VMRO-DPMNE
Eastern Statistical Region	Makedonska Kamenica	Dimčo Atanasovski	51.00%	VMRO-DPMNE
Eastern Statistical Region	Pehčevo	Alexander Kitanski	51.23%	VMRO-DPMNE
Eastern Statistical Region	Probištip	Dragan Anastasov	49.57%	SDSM
Eastern Statistical Region	Štip	Ivan Jordanov	54.22%	VMRO-DPMNE
Eastern Statistical Region	Vinica	Mile Petkov	54.74%	VMRO-DPMNE
Eastern Statistical Region	Zrnovci	Borčo Kocev	54.54%	VMRO-DPMNE
Northeastern Statistical Region	Kratovo	Todorče Nikolovski	59.92%	VMRO-DPMNE
Northeastern Statistical Region	Kriva Palanka	Saško Mitovski	54.75%	SDSM
Northeastern Statistical Region	Kumanovo	Maksim Dimitrievski	55.30%	Independent
Northeastern Statistical Region	Lipkovo	Erkan Arifi	72.59%	BDI
Northeastern Statistical Region	Rankovce	Borče Spasovski	51.60%	VMRO-DPMNE
Northeastern Statistical Region	Staro Nagoričane	Žaklina Jovanovska	55.58%	SDSM
Pelagonia Statistical Region	Bitola	Toni Konjanovski	50.73%	VMRO-DPMNE
Pelagonia Statistical Region	Demir Hisar	Nikola Najdovski	49.75%	VMRO-DPMNE
Pelagonia Statistical Region	Dolneni	Urim Ibeski	51.30%	BDI
Pelagonia Statistical Region	Krivogaštani	Nikolče Miskoski	50.83%	SDSM
Pelagonia Statistical Region	Kruševo	Tome Hristovski	52.70%	SDSM
Pelagonia Statistical Region	Mogila	Dragančo Sabotkovski	57.28%	VMRO-DPMNE
Pelagonia Statistical Region	Novaci	Stevče Stevanovski	51.29%	VMRO-DPMNE
Pelagonia Statistical Region	Prilep	Borče Jovčeski	54.86%	VMRO-DPMNE
Pelagonia Statistical Region	Resen	Jovan Tozievski	50.06%	VMRO-DPMNE
Polog Statistical Region	Bogovinje	Besnik Emshiu	62.30%	BDI
Polog Statistical Region	Brvenica	Jovica Ilievski	49.09%	VMRO-DPMNE
Polog Statistical Region	Gostivar	Arben Taravari	57.79%	ASH
Polog Statistical Region	Jegunovce	Dimitar Kostadinoski	50.40%	VMRO-DPMNE
Polog Statistical Region	Mavrovo and Rostuša	Medat Kurtovski		SDSM
Polog Statistical Region	Tearce	Nuhi Neziri	55.87%	BDI
Polog Statistical Region	Tetovo	Bilall Kasami	54.84%	BESA
Polog Statistical Region	Vrapčište	Isen Shabani	51.00%	ASH
Polog Statistical Region	Želino	Blerim Sejdiu	49.97%	BESA
Skopje Statistical Region	Skopje	Danela Arsovska	54.66%	Independent
Skopje Statistical Region	Aerodrom	Timčo Mucunski	55.11%	VMRO-DPMNE
Skopje Statistical Region	Aračinovo	Ridvan Ibraimi	50.54%	BDI
Skopje Statistical Region	Butel	Darko Kostovski	52.79%	VMRO-DPMNE
Skopje Statistical Region	Čair	Visar Ganiu	55.24%	BDI
Skopje Statistical Region	Centar	Goran Gerasimovski	51.88%	SDSM
Skopje Statistical Region	Čučer-Sandevo	Saško Komnenoviḱ	50.73%	SDSM
Skopje Statistical Region	Gazi Baba	Boban Stefkovski	60.00%	VMRO-DPMNE
Skopje Statistical Region	Gjorče Petrov	Aleksandar Stojkoski	50.24%	VMRO-DPMNE
Skopje Statistical Region	Ilinden	Aleksandar Georgievski	53.40%	VMRO-DPMNE
Skopje Statistical Region	Karpoš	Stevčo Jakimovski	49.61%	GROM
Skopje Statistical Region	Kisela Voda	Orce Gjorgievski	52.50%	VMRO-DPMNE
Skopje Statistical Region	Petrovec	Borče Mitevski	63.84%	VMRO-DPMNE
Skopje Statistical Region	Saraj	Blerim Bexheti	73.10%	BDI
Skopje Statistical Region	Sopište	Stefce Trpkovski	65.03%	VMRO-DPMNE
Skopje Statistical Region	Studeničani	Azem Sadiku	49.73%	PDSH
Skopje Statistical Region	Šuto Orizari	Kurto Duduš	51.26%	DOM – LDP
Skopje Statistical Region	Zelenikovo	Kosta Manevski	51.64%	VMRO-DPMNE
Southeastern Statistical Region	Bogdanci	Blaže Šapov	50.70%	SDSM
Southeastern Statistical Region	Bosilovo	Risto Manchev	58.33%	VMRO-DPMNE
Southeastern Statistical Region	Gevgelija	Andon Saramandov	56.88%	VMRO-DPMNE
Southeastern Statistical Region	Dojran	Ango Angov	53.21%	SDSM
Southeastern Statistical Region	Konče	Zlatko Ristov	49.88%	VMRO-DPMNE
Southeastern Statistical Region	Novo Selo	Ǵorǵe Božinov	51.05%	VMRO-DPMNE
Southeastern Statistical Region	Radoviš	Aco Ristov	58.70%	VMRO-DPMNE
Southeastern Statistical Region	Strumica	Kostadin Kostadinov	53.70%	SDSM
Southeastern Statistical Region	Valandovo	Pero Kostadinov	57.73%	SDSM
Southeastern Statistical Region	Vasilevo	Slave Andonov	49.22%	VMRO-DPMNE
Southwestern Statistical Region	Centar Župa	Arijan Ibraim		DPT
Southwestern Statistical Region	Debar	Hekuran Duka	49.69%	BDI
Southwestern Statistical Region	Debarca	Zoran Nogačeski	52.81%	Independent
Southwestern Statistical Region	Kičevo	Fatmir Dehari	52.98%	BDI
Southwestern Statistical Region	Makedonski Brod	Žarko Risteski	48.97%	VMRO-DPMNE
Southwestern Statistical Region	Ohrid	Kiril Pecakov	54.60%	VMRO-DPMNE
Southwestern Statistical Region	Plasnica	Ismail Jahoski	76.65%	BDI
Southwestern Statistical Region	Struga	Ramiz Merko	52.07%	BDI
Southwestern Statistical Region	Vevčani	Spase Kočovski	50.41%	VMRO-DPMNE
Vardar Statistical Region	Čaška	Goran Stojanovski	56.07%	SDSM
Vardar Statistical Region	Demir Kapija	Lazar Petrov	49.83%	SDSM
Vardar Statistical Region	Gradsko	Kiro Nackov	55.66%	VMRO-DPMNE
Vardar Statistical Region	Kavadarci	Mitko Janchev	72.35%	VMRO-DPMNE
Vardar Statistical Region	Negotino	Goran Stojanov	51.94%	VMRO-DPMNE
Vardar Statistical Region	Rosoman	Stojan Nikolov	53.65%	SDSM
Vardar Statistical Region	Sveti Nikole	Dejan Vladev	51.97%	VMRO-DPMNE
Vardar Statistical Region	Lozovo	Boško Cvetkovski	49.94%	VMRO-DPMNE
Vardar Statistical Region	Veles	Marko Kolev	51.63%	VMRO-DPMNE

== Council results ==
Party	Seats
VMRO-DPMNE	468
Social Democratic Union of Macedonia	396
Democratic Union for Integration	169
Alliance for Albanians	82
Independents and Others	72
The Left	49
Besa Movement	36
Democratic Renewal of Macedonia – Liberal Democratic Party	27
Democratic Party of Turks	16
Democratic Party of Albanians	8
Citizen Option for Macedonia	2

== Aftermath ==
Due to the negative results, Zaev resigned from his positions as leader of SDSM and prime minister. There was a motion of no confidence (submitted by VMRO-DPMNE) of the Government of North Macedonia in 11 November, but due to 60 votes, it was not voted out. Minister of Finance Dimitar Kovačevski succeeded Zaev as party leader and prime minister. In March 2022, OSCE stated: "The October 2021 local elections in North Macedonia were competitive and fundamental freedoms were widely respected, but shortcomings in the legal framework underscore the need for a comprehensive reform."
