= President of North Macedonia =

Head of state

President of the Republic of North Macedonia
- Претседател на Република Северна Македонија (Macedonian); Presidenti i Republikës së Maqedonisë së Veriut (Albanian)
- Presidential coat of arms

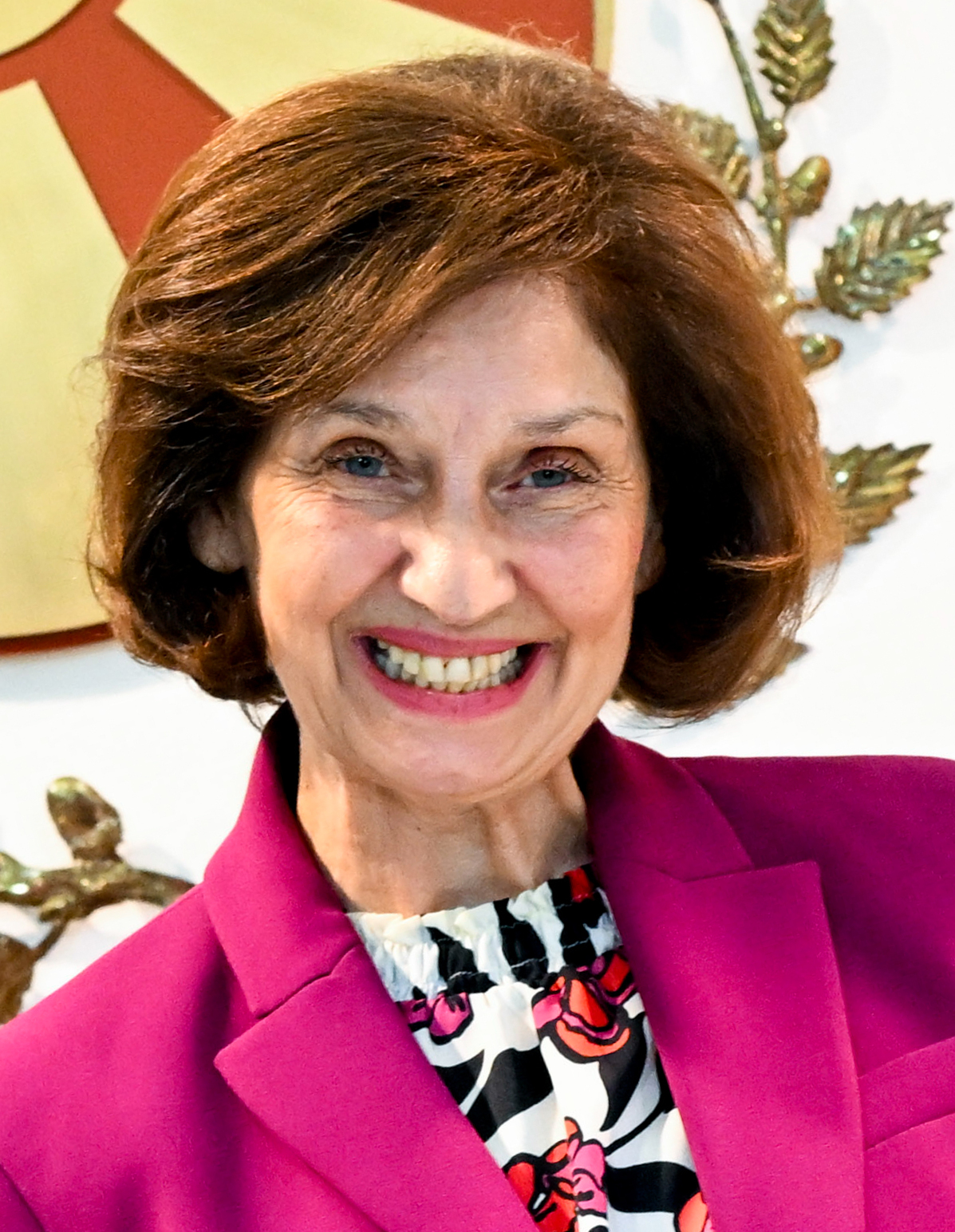
- Incumbent; Gordana Siljanovska-Davkova since 12 May 2024
- Status: Head of state
- Residence: Villa Vodno
- Appointer: Direct election
- Term length: Five years, renewable once
- Constituting instrument: Constitution of North Macedonia
- First holder: Kiro Gligorov
- Salary: 17,250 USD annually
- Website: pretsedatel.mk

The president of the Republic of North Macedonia (Macedonian: Претседател на Република Северна Македонија, romanized: Pretsedatel na Republika Severna Makedonija; Albanian: Presidenti i Republikës së Maqedonisë së Veriut) (Note: In Macedonian, the feminine form of the position is Претседателка на Република Северна Македонија, while in Albanian it is Presidentја е Republikës së Maqedonisë së Veriut.) is the head of state of North Macedonia.

The first president was Kiro Gligorov, the oldest Macedonian political official, until the end of his term in 1999. Although largely a ceremonial position, with most of the political power being vested in the Government and the Assembly, the president is the commander-in-chief of the armed forces and has an important role in performing foreign affairs.

Candidacy, election, presidential rights and obligations are determined by the constitution of North Macedonia and laws.

== System ==
The candidacy and election of the president are determined in Articles 80 and 81 of the constitution of North Macedonia. From 1991, it has been ensured through the constitution that the president can be chosen through direct election. Per Article 81, a presidential candidate can be nominated by 10,000 voters or 30 deputies. To be eligible as a candidate, one must be a citizen of North Macedonia and to have lived within the country for 10 years in the 15 years before the elections. The election has a modified two-round system; a candidate can only be elected in the first round of voting if they receive the equivalent of over 50% of the vote from all registered voters. In the second round, voter turnout must be at least 40% for the result to be deemed valid.

Before 2009, the constitution required a 50% turnout in the second round. The XXXI amendment to the constitution, voted on 9 January 2009 by all 86 present deputies, lowered it to the current 40%, as the government feared the tendency of ever lower election turnout would make presidential elections frequently invalidated. In the 2009 Macedonian presidential election that followed, the turnout in the second round ended up being 42.6%. The president has a five-year term and can be elected twice.

Article 75 regulates the presidential veto. The decree for the promulgation of laws is signed by the country's president and the Assembly's president. The former might decide not to sign the decree promulgating the law. The Assembly then has to review the law again and if it is approved by a two-thirds majority vote of the total number of deputies, the president is obliged to sign the decree. The president cannot veto laws which require a two-thirds majority of the total number of deputies. According to articles 79 and 84, the president can nominate and appoint judicial officials, diplomatic representatives and others. Article 84 also allows the president to grant pardons in accordance with the law. The president can submit a proposal for the declaration of a state of emergency and war to the Assembly. If the Assembly cannot meet, then the president can request it when the Assembly meets. When the Assembly cannot meet in that type of state, the president can appoint and expel government officials. The president signs international treaties as a representative of the state, is the commander-in-chief of the armed forces and the leader of the Security Council.

Per Article 82, if the president dies, resigns or becomes permanently incapable, then the president of the Assembly will serve in the position until the election of a new president. The president can be removed from the post when the Assembly initiates the process with a two-thirds majority of its deputies, after which the Constitutional Court can impeach the president if a two-thirds majority of its judges agree. Despite the president's significant role in foreign affairs, judicial appointments and such, the overall political power is in the government and the Assembly.

== History ==
The first president of the Yugoslav Macedonian state was Metodija Andonov Čento, elected at the first plenary session of ASNOM, when the state was formed, while the last president of the collective presidency was Vladimir Mitkov.

To accomplish the transition from socialist system to parliamentary democracy, the Assembly of the Socialist Republic of Macedonia voted to replace the collective presidency with a single-president post on 20 September 1990. Kiro Gligorov was elected as the first president of the Socialist Republic of Macedonia on 27 January 1991 by the Assembly. On 16 April 1991, the Assembly adopted a constitutional amendment, removing the term "Socialist" from the official name of the country, and on 7 June of the same year, the new name Republic of Macedonia (now North Macedonia) was officially established. Hence, Gligorov continued his function as President of the Republic of Macedonia.

After the process of dissolution of Yugoslavia began, the Republic of Macedonia proclaimed full independence following a referendum held on 8 September 1991. Gligorov was incapacitated after an assassination attempt in 1995. Stojan Andov served as acting president for 98 days during Gligorov's recovery. During the 1990s, Republic of Macedonia had a semi-presidential system. Gligorov was the primary actor when it came to setting the foreign policy agenda, as he had more international contacts than the prime minister Branko Crvenkovski. On completing his second term as head of state, Gligorov was succeeded by Boris Trajkovski in 1999. The 2001 Ohrid Agreement, brokered by Trajkovski, led to the adoption of constitutional amendments on 16 November 2001, which reduced the importance of the president. Trajkovski himself did not want to exercise influence over foreign policy.

After Trajkovski's death in 2004, Crvenkovski was elected as the next president, which was already a ceremonial role. In 2016, president Gjorge Ivanov pardoned Nikola Gruevski's government officials who were being investigated for wiretapping, corruption and electoral fraud, which caused massive public protests. Gordana Siljanovska-Davkova was elected as North Macedonia's first female president and she has been the incumbent president since taking office on 12 May 2024.

== List of presidents ==
=== Socialist Republic of Macedonia ===
Parties

KPM/SKM Independent

Status

Acting President

No.	Portrait	Name (Birth-Death)	Term of office		Political party
President of Initiatory Committee for the Anti-fascist Assembly for the National Liberation of Macedonia (ASNOM); 1943–1944
1		Metodija Andonov-Čento (1902–1957)	1 October 1943	2 August 1944	KPM
1	Chairman of the Anti-fascist Assembly for the National Liberation of Macedonia (ASNOM); 1944–1945				
1		Metodija Andonov-Čento (1902–1957)	2 August 1944	1 January 1945	KPM
1	Presidents of the Presidency of the People's Assembly; 1945–1953				
1		Metodija Andonov-Čento (1902–1957)	1 January 1945	15 March 1946	KPM
—		Dimitar Nestorov (1890–1968)	16 March 1946	30 December 1946	KPM
2		Blagoja Fotev (1900–1993)	1947	4 January 1951	KPM
—		Vidoe Smilevski (1915–1979)	4 January 1951	1953	KPM
Presidents of the People's Assembly; 1953–1974
3		Dimče Stojanov (1910–1991)	1953	19 December 1953	SKM
4		Lazar Koliševski (1914–2000)	19 December 1953	26 June 1962	SKM
5		Ljupčo Arsov (1910–1986)	26 June 1962	24 June 1963	SKM
6		Vidoe Smilevski (1915–1979)	25 June 1963	12 May 1967	SKM
7		Mito Hadživasilev (1921–1968)	12 May 1967	1 August 1968	SKM
8		Nikola Minčev (1915–1997)	23 December 1968	6 May 1974	SKM
Presidents of the Presidency; 1974–1991
9		Vidoe Smilevski (1915–1979)	6 May 1974	31 October 1979	SKM
10		Ljupčo Arsov (1910–1986)	31 October 1979	29 April 1982	SKM
11		Angel Čemerski (1923–2005)	29 April 1982	29 April 1983	SKM
12		Blagoja Taleski (1924–2001)	29 April 1983	29 April 1984	SKM
13		Tome Bukleski (1921–2018)	29 April 1984	26 April 1985	SKM
14		Vančo Apostolski (1925–2008)	26 April 1985	28 April 1986	SKM
—		Mateja Matevski (1929–2018)	28 April 1986	30 April 1986	SKM
15		Dragoljub Stavrev (1932–2003)	30 April 1986	May 1988	SKM
16		Jezdimir Bogdanski (1930–2007)	May 1988	28 April 1990	SKM
17		Vladimir Mitkov (1931–2024)	28 April 1990	27 January 1991	SKM
Presidents of SR Macedonia; 1991
18		Kiro Gligorov (1917–2012)	27 January 1991	8 September 1991	Independent

=== Republic of Macedonia / North Macedonia ===
Parties

LPM DA VMRO-DPMNE SDSM Independent

Status

Acting president

No.	Portrait	Name (Birth–Death)	Term of office			Political party	Election
No.	Portrait	Name (Birth–Death)	Took office	Left office	Time in office	Political party	Election
1	Kiro Gligorov	Kiro Gligorov (1917–2012)	8 September 1991	4 October 1995	4 years, 26 days	SDSM	1994
–	Stojan Andov	Stojan Andov (1935–2024); Acting	4 October 1995	10 January 1996	98 days	LPM	—
(1)	Kiro Gligorov	Kiro Gligorov (1917–2012)	10 January 1996	19 November 1999	3 years, 313 days	SDSM	–
–	Savo Klimovski	Savo Klimovski (born 1947); Acting	19 November 1999	15 December 1999	26 days	DA	—
2	Boris Trajkovski	Boris Trajkovski (1956–2004)	15 December 1999	26 February 2004 †	4 years, 73 days	VMRO-DPMNE	1999
–	Ljupčo Jordanovski	Ljupčo Jordanovski (1953–2010); Acting	26 February 2004	12 May 2004	76 days	SDSM	—
3	Branko Crvenkovski	Branko Crvenkovski (born 1962)	12 May 2004	12 May 2009	5 years	SDSM	2004
4	Gjorge Ivanov	Gjorge Ivanov (born 1960)	12 May 2009	12 May 2019	10 years	VMRO-DPMNE	2009; 2014
5	Stevo Pendarovski	Stevo Pendarovski (born 1963)	12 May 2019	12 May 2024	5 years	SDSM	2019
6	Gordana Siljanovska-Davkova	Gordana Siljanovska-Davkova (born 1953)	12 May 2024	Incumbent	2 years, 192 days	VMRO-DPMNE	2024

== Latest election ==
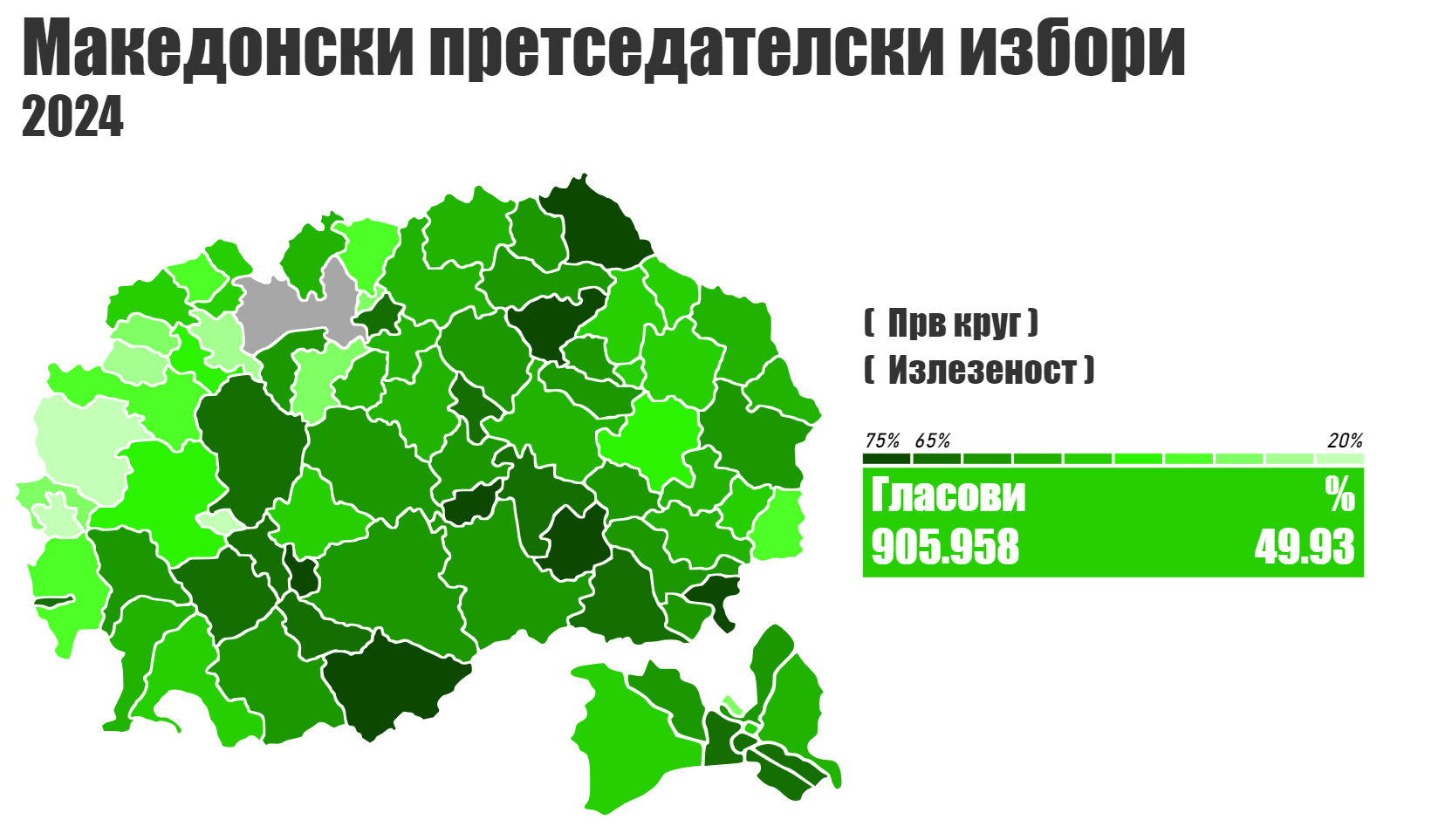
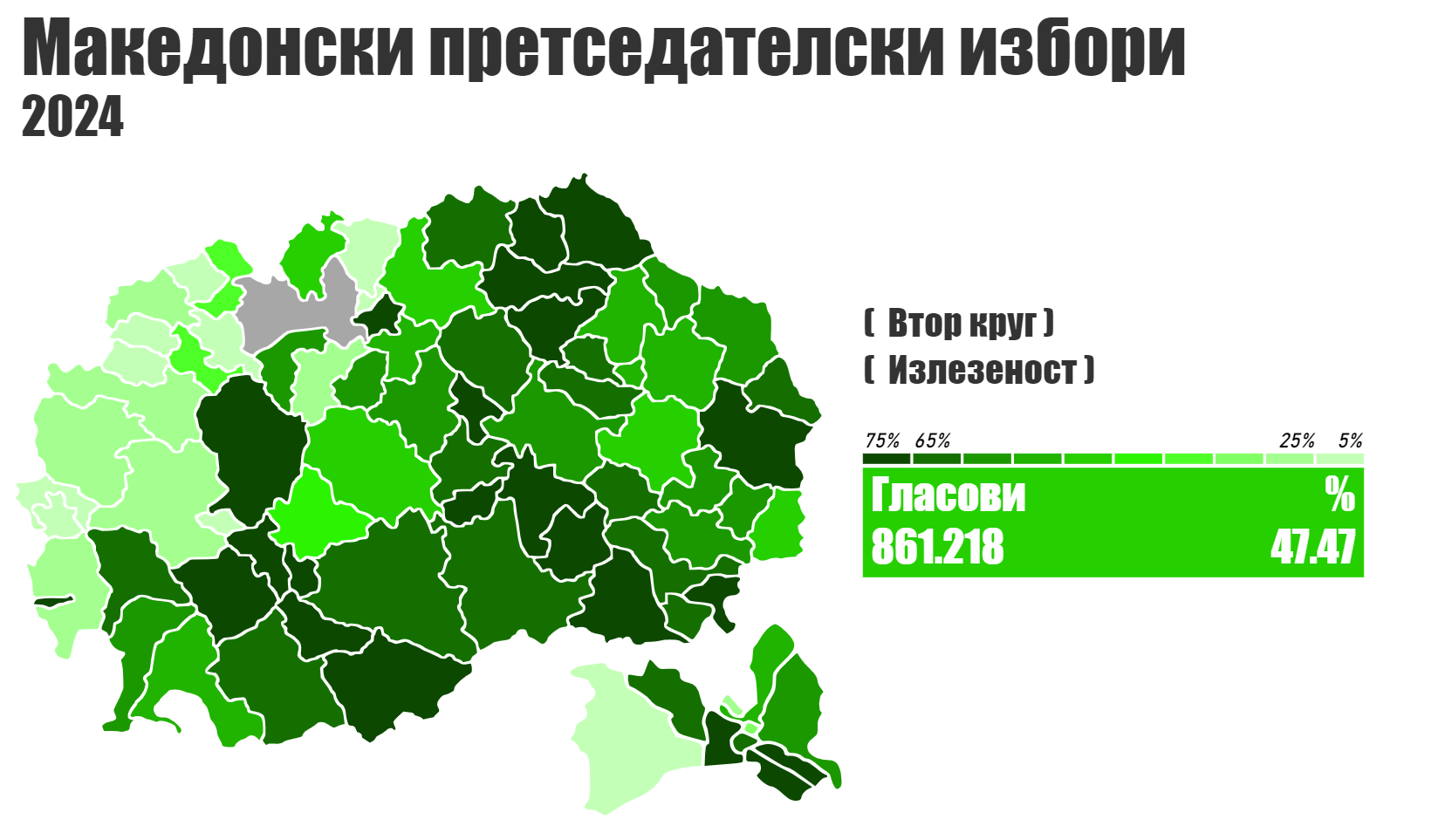
Turnout by round and municipality

Candidate	Party	First round		Second round	
Candidate	Party	Votes	%	Votes	%
Gordana Siljanovska-Davkova	VMRO-DPMNE	363,085	41.21	561,000	69.01
Stevo Pendarovski	Social Democratic Union of Macedonia	180,499	20.49	251,899	30.99
Bujar Osmani	Democratic Union for Integration	120,811	13.71		
Maksim Dimitrievski	For Our Macedonia	83,855	9.52		
Arben Taravari	Alliance for Albanians	83,337	9.46		
Biljana Vankovska	Independent (Note: Endorsed by The Left)	41,331	4.69		
Stevčo Jakimovski	Citizen Option for Macedonia	8,121	0.92		
Total		881,039	100.00	812,899	100.00
Valid votes		881,039	97.29	812,899	94.39
Invalid/blank votes		24,560	2.71	48,289	5.61
Total votes		905,599	100.00	861,188	100.00
Registered voters/turnout		1,814,317	49.91	1,814,317	47.47
Source: State Election Commission Round 1, State Election Commission Round 2

== See also ==
- Vice President of Macedonia
- Prime Minister of North Macedonia
- List of presidents of the Assembly of North Macedonia
