= Biljana Vankovska =

Macedonian political scientist

Biljana Vankovska Cvetovska (Macedonian: Билјана Ванковска Цветковска; born 14 November 1959) is a Macedonian doctor of political sciences. She is a full professor and head of postgraduate studies in peace and development at the Faculty of Philosophy at the Ss. Cyril and Methodius University of Skopje. Additionally, she is a professor at the European Peace University in Austria.

== Biography ==
Vankovska ran for president in the 2014 Macedonian general election but did not achieve enough signatures to qualify as a candidate. Using the example of her university colleague Gordana Siljanovska-Davkova, who ran for the VMRO-DPMNE in the 2019 election, she sought a party endorsement for the 2024 election. The Left endorsed her candidacy based on their shared left-wing politics and patriotism.

Vankovska is an opponent of NATO, which she sees as a force of Western imperialism, and said that she would use the presidency to initiate the withdrawal of North Macedonia's membership. She has referred to the Treaty of Friendship, Good-Neighbourliness and Cooperation with Bulgaria, the Prespa Agreement settling the Macedonia naming dispute with Greece, and the Ohrid Agreement with the Albanian minority as a "Bermuda Triangle" for the country. Since the Gaza war, Vankovska has worn a keffiyeh. When presidential candidate Bujar Osmani invited all his opponents to an iftar except her and Stevčo Jakimovski, she reacted by questioning the ethics of holding a Muslim feast while there is famine in Gaza.

During her campaign, along with The Left, she promoted cooperation with China, leaving NATO and EU integrations and seeking other alternatives. Vankovska was eliminated in the first round of voting. She said that her voters were the "vanguard" and that the public was not sufficiently enlightened to appreciate her proposals. She came sixth of seven candidates, in front of Jakimovski, with 41,331 votes (4.69%).

Vankovska has three daughters, all of whom are adults.

== Published works ==
- Vankovska, Biljana; Wiberg, Håkan, (2003). Between past and future: civil-military relations in post-communist Balkan states. The library of international relations. London; New York: I.B. Tauris. ISBN 978-1-86064-624-9.
