= 2024 North Macedonian presidential election =

- 24 April 2024 (first round); 8 May 2024 (second round)
- Turnout: 49.91% (first round) ▲8.24pp 47.47% (second round) ▲0.81pp
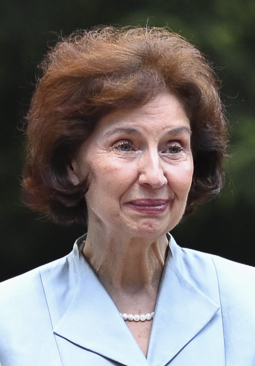

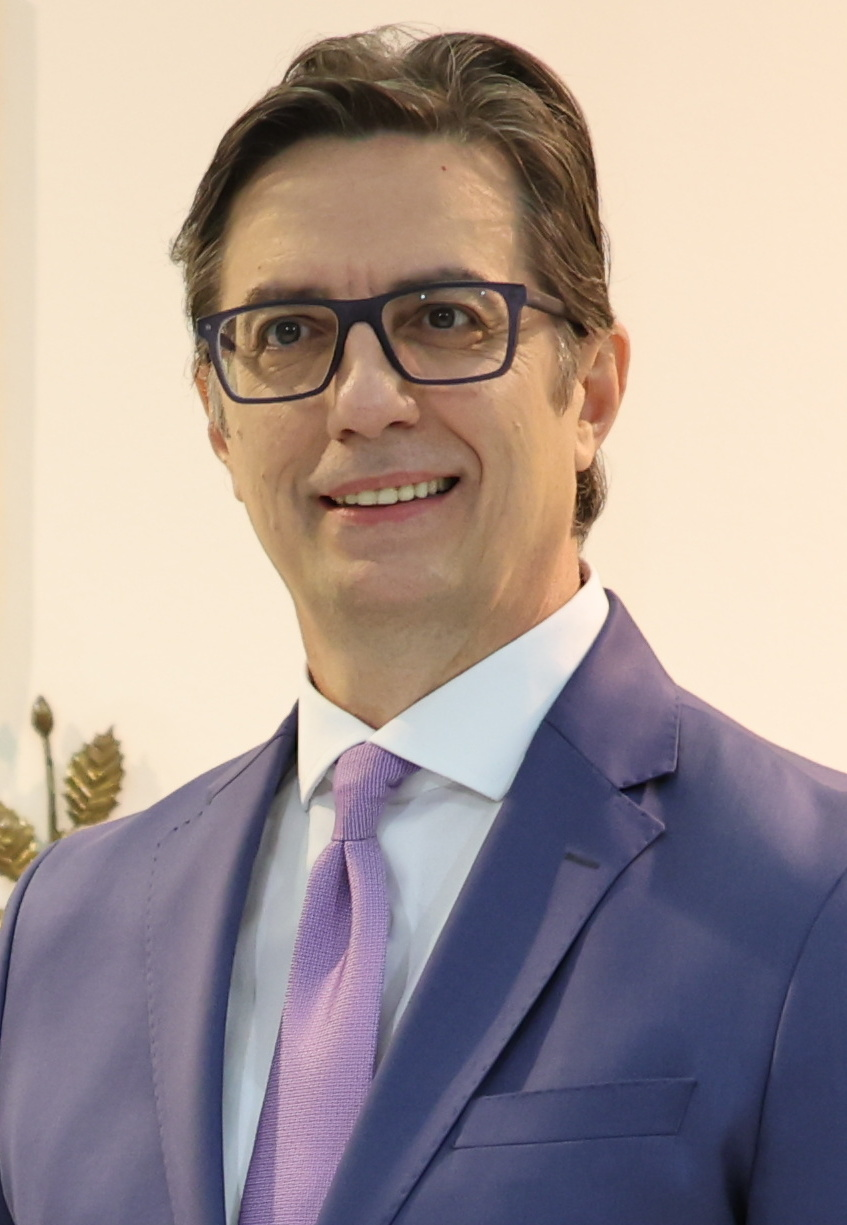
Nominee	Gordana Siljanovska	Stevo Pendarovski
Party	VMRO-DPMNE	SDSM
Alliance	Your Macedonia	For a European Future
Popular vote	561,000	251,899
Percentage	69.01%	30.99%
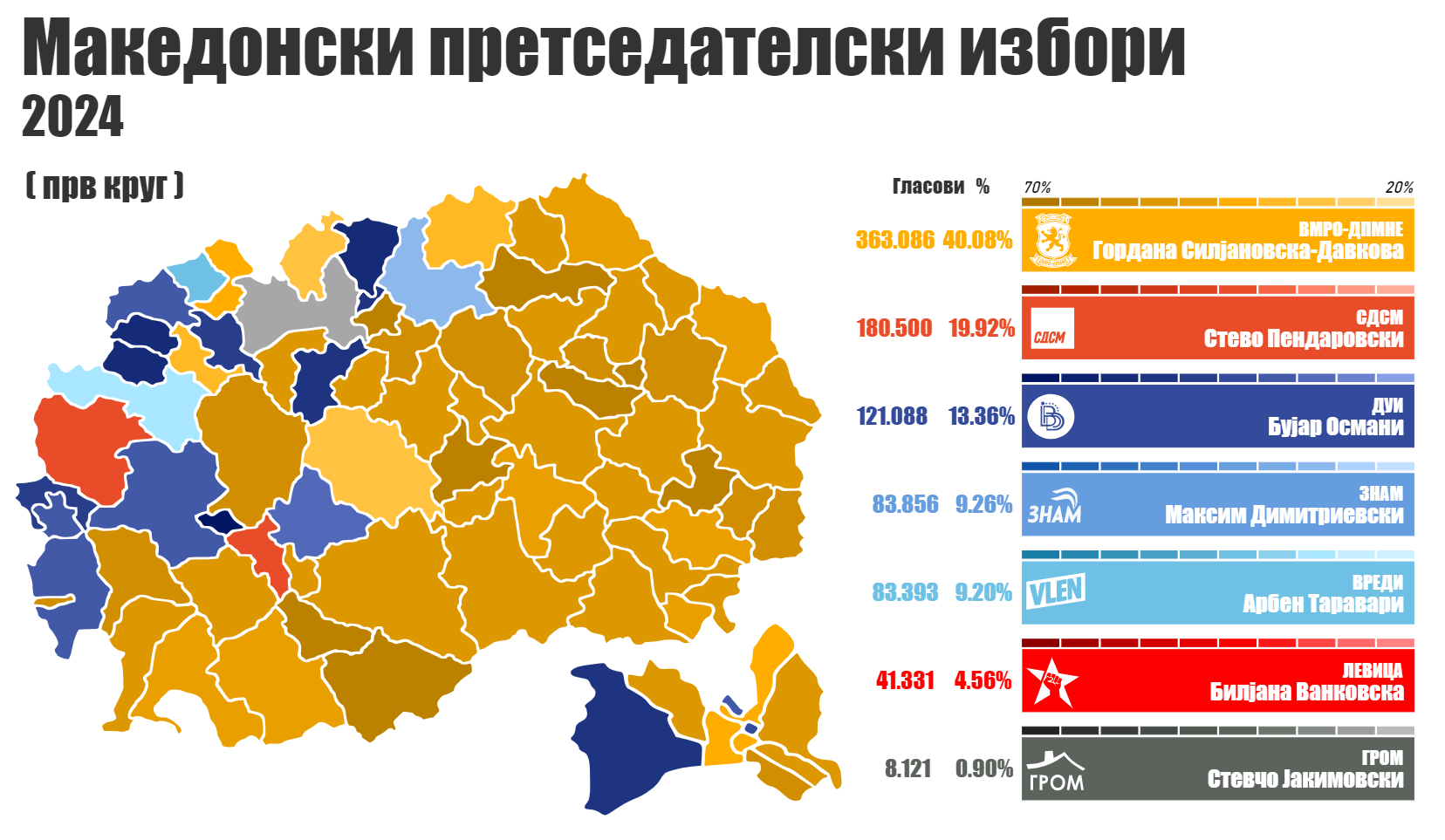
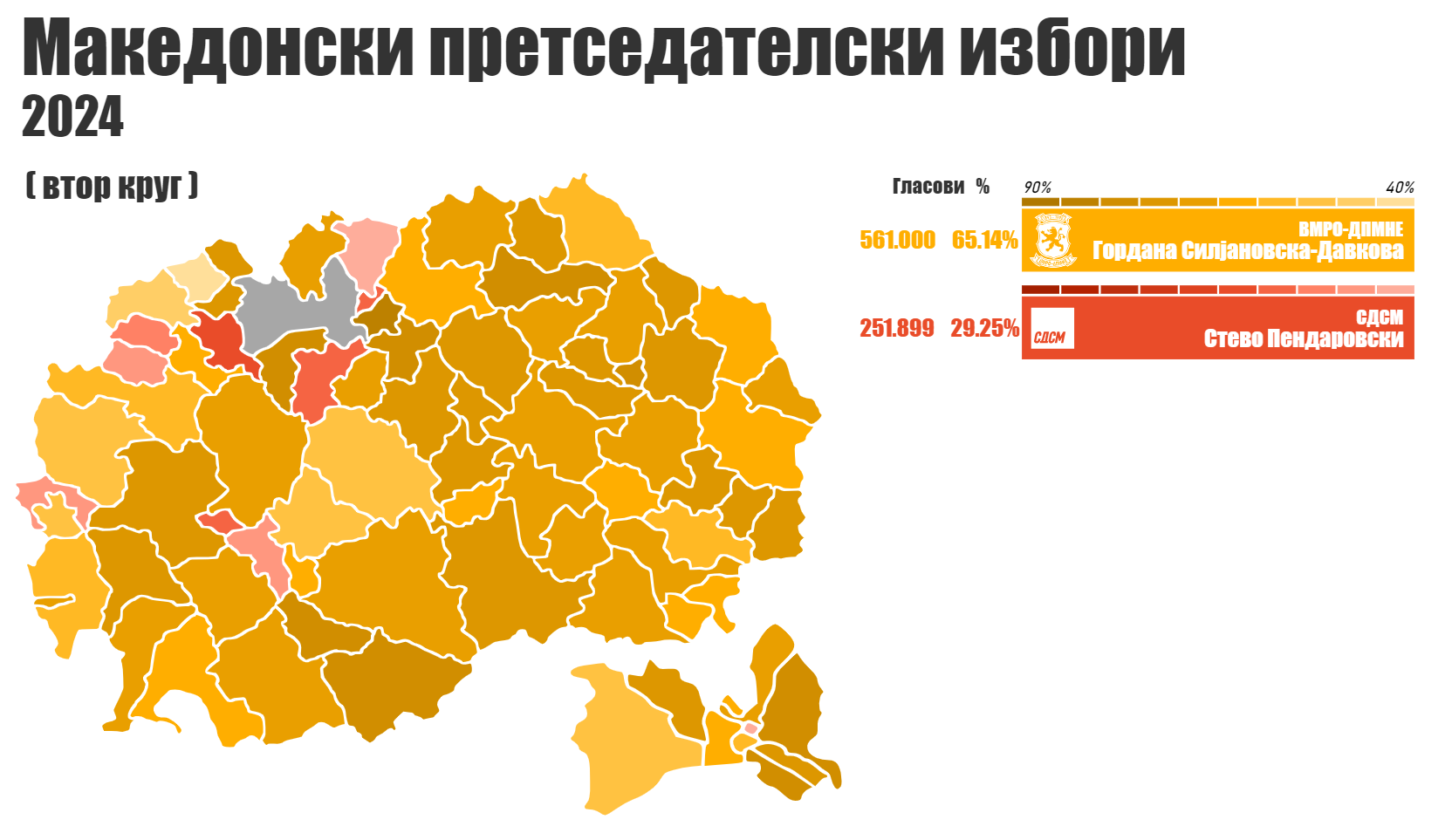
President before election
Stevo Pendarovski
SDSM
Elected President
Gordana Siljanovska-Davkova
VMRO-DPMNE

Presidential elections were held in North Macedonia on 24 April 2024. Incumbent Stevo Pendarovski of the ruling centre-left Social Democrats ran for re-election to a second term.

No candidate received a majority of the vote in the first round, with right-wing challenger Gordana Siljanovska-Davkova placing first by a wide margin with 41% of the vote, while Pendarovski finished second with 20% of the vote. The two faced off in the second round run-off on 8 May, which was held alongside parliamentary elections. In the second round, Siljanovska defeated the incumbent Pendarovski with 69% of the vote and became the first woman to be elected president of North Macedonia. She was inaugurated on 12 May.

== Electoral system ==
The President of North Macedonia is elected using a modified two-round system; a candidate can only be elected in the first round of voting if they receive the equivalent of over 50% of the vote from all registered voters. In the second round, voter turnout must be at least 40% for the result to be deemed valid. Before 2009, the constitution required turnout in the second round to be 50% to validate the result. However, the XXXI amendment approved on 9 January 2009 lowered the threshold to 40%, as the then-government feared the trend of reducing turnouts would lead to presidential elections being frequently invalidated. In the 2009 presidential elections, second round turnout was just 42.6%.

In order to contest the election, potential candidates are required to collect signatures from at least 10,000 registered voters or 30 MPs.

The constitution mandates that the President must be over 40 years of age and have lived in the country for ten of the last fifteen years.

Campaigning began on 4 April 2024.

== Candidates ==
Ballot position	Candidate	Affiliation	Declared intent to run	Signatures collected/endorsements
1.	Stevo Pendarovski (incumbent)	SDSM (Note: Endorsed by SDSM. Also endorsed by LDP, DOM, NSDP, SDA, PEI, PDPR, PDT, POEN, VMRO-NP, SDU, DSVM, PP and SRM.)	28 February 2024	22,413
2.	Gordana Siljanovska-Davkova	VMRO-DPMNE (Note: Endorsed by VMRO-DPMNE. Also endorsed by SPM.)	22 February 2024	30 MPs
3.	Stevčo Jakimovski	GROM (Note: Also endorsed by Macedonian Conservative Party INTEGRA)	21 February 2024	11,292
4.	Bujar Osmani	Democratic Union for Integration (Note: Also endorsed by DPA, AA (Ziadin Sela faction), People's Movement, European Democratic Party, Union of the Roma, DPT, Movement of Turks for Justice and Democracy and Bosniak Democratic Union)	22 February 2024	11,085
5.	Biljana Vankovska	Independent (Note: Endorsed by The Left)	7 February 2024	10,568
6.	Arben Taravari	Alliance for Albanians (Note: Endorsed by Coalition "Worth" (Albanian: Vlen), which includes Besa, Alternative, Democratic Movement and the Arben Taravari faction of Alliance for Albanians)	15 February 2024	10,708
7.	Maksim Dimitrievski	ZNAM	22 February 2024	11,605

=== Failed to collect enough signatures ===
Candidate	Affiliation	Declared intent to run	Signatures collected
Velo Markovski	Independent (Note: Member of VMRO-DPMNE who has announced his run without his party's endorsement)	19 October 2023	1,668
Gospodin Poposki	Independent	15 February 2024	147
Gjorgji Manaskov	Independent	16 February 2024	496
Mersiha Smailović	Bosniak Democratic Union	21 February 2024	3,246
Zorica Cvetkovska	Desna	24 February 2024	293
Goce Ristov	Independent	4 March 2024	6
Dragan Nikolovski	Independent	6 March 2024	8

=== Dropped out ===
Candidate	Affiliation	Declared intent to run	Dropped out	Signatures collected (23 February)
Tome Nikoloski	Independent	15 May 2023	23 February 2024	0

== Campaign ==
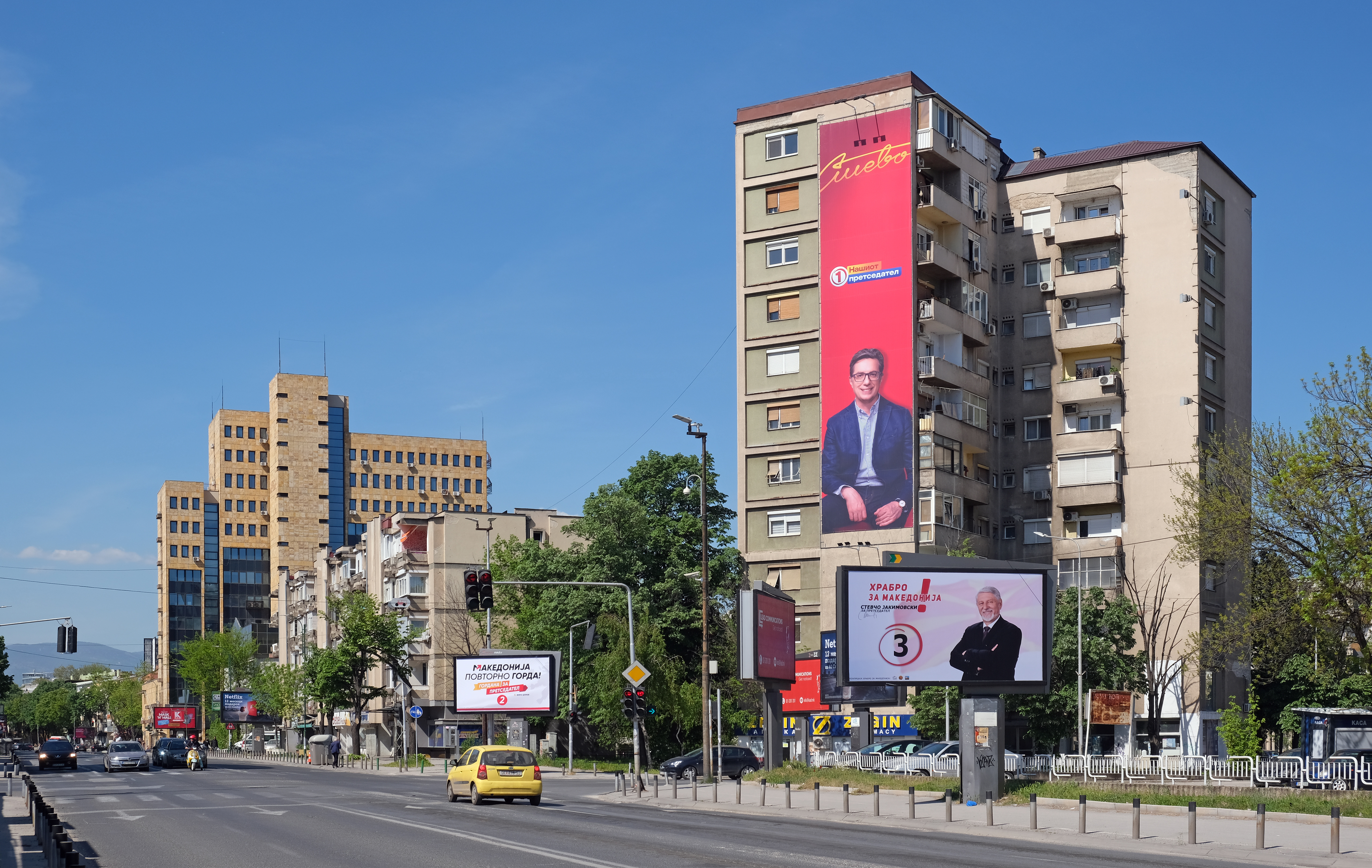
Presidential election advertisements in Skopje.

Stevo Pendarovski supported revising the constitution to include recognition of a Bulgarian minority in North Macedonia, a condition set by Bulgaria to allow the country's accession to the European Union. Gordana Siljanovska-Davkova called for negotiations with the EU under a new framework and for such amendments to be made after North Macedonia attains EU membership. Pendarovski called on fighting corruption through taking on organized criminal groups, while Siljanovska-Davkova focused on the judiciary in her anti-corruption stance.

Following the first round, Gordana Siljanovska-Davkova said "the hour has come for this government to go" and described the results as a "new course". She also called on voters to prove "that we have always (belonged to) Europe". Stevo Pendarovski expressed surprise and disappointment with the result, but expressed hope for improvement in the second round, including with the support of the Albanian community.

The Democratic Union for Integration, which represents ethnic Albanians and supported former Foreign Minister Bujar Osmani as a presidential candidate, offered its support in the second round to any candidate who supports having the President selected by the Assembly of North Macedonia in future elections, in the hopes of having an ethnic Albanian attaining the office. However, both Pendarovski and Siljanovska-Davkova dismissed the proposal, saying it is democratic for the Presidency to be selected through direct voting.

== Conduct ==
Polling in the first round opened at 07:00 on 24 April and lasted until 19:00 at 3,480 polling stations nationwide. About 1.8 million people were eligible to vote, while around 2,300 domestic and international observers monitored the proceedings.

== Opinion polls ==
First round

Polling firm	Date	Sample size							
Polling firm	Date	Sample size	Pendarovski	Siljanovska	Taravari	Osmani	Dimitrievski	Vankovska	Jakimovski
Polling firm	Date	Sample size	SDSM	VMRO-DPMNE	ASh	BDI	ZNAM	Levica	GROM
Election Results	24 Apr 2024	881,039	20.5	41.2	9.5	13.7	9.5	4.7	0.9
IPIS	Apr 2024	1,200	23.8	39.0	10.7	11.5	7.7	5.5	1.6
CRPC	8–13 Apr 2024	1,210	28.8	35.0	13.6	11.5	4.6	4.5	2.1
МКД.мк	15–24 Mar 2024	1,200	19.8	36.5	10.5	14.3	12.1	4.9	1.5
CRPC	4–7 Mar 2024	1,085	29.3	35.5	14.3	9.6	5.1	4.3	2.0
IPIS (Note: Poll conducted before any candidates qualified to be on the ballot)	20 Feb 2024	1,212	22.3	39.2	13.4 (Note: Combined results for ASh and the VLEN coalition)	12.2	5.8	6.4	–
2019 election		–	44.8	44.2	11.1 (Note: Different candidate (Blerim Reka), endorsed by all parties of the VLEN coalition except Democratic Movement, which did not exist in 2019)	–	–	–	–

Second round

Polling firm	Date	Sample size		
Polling firm	Date	Sample size	Pendarovski	Siljanovska
Polling firm	Date	Sample size	SDSM	VMRO-DPMNE
Election Results	8 May 2024	812,899	31.0	69.0
МКД.мк	15–24 Mar 2024	1,200	44.2	55.8
2019 election		–	53.6	46.4

== Results ==
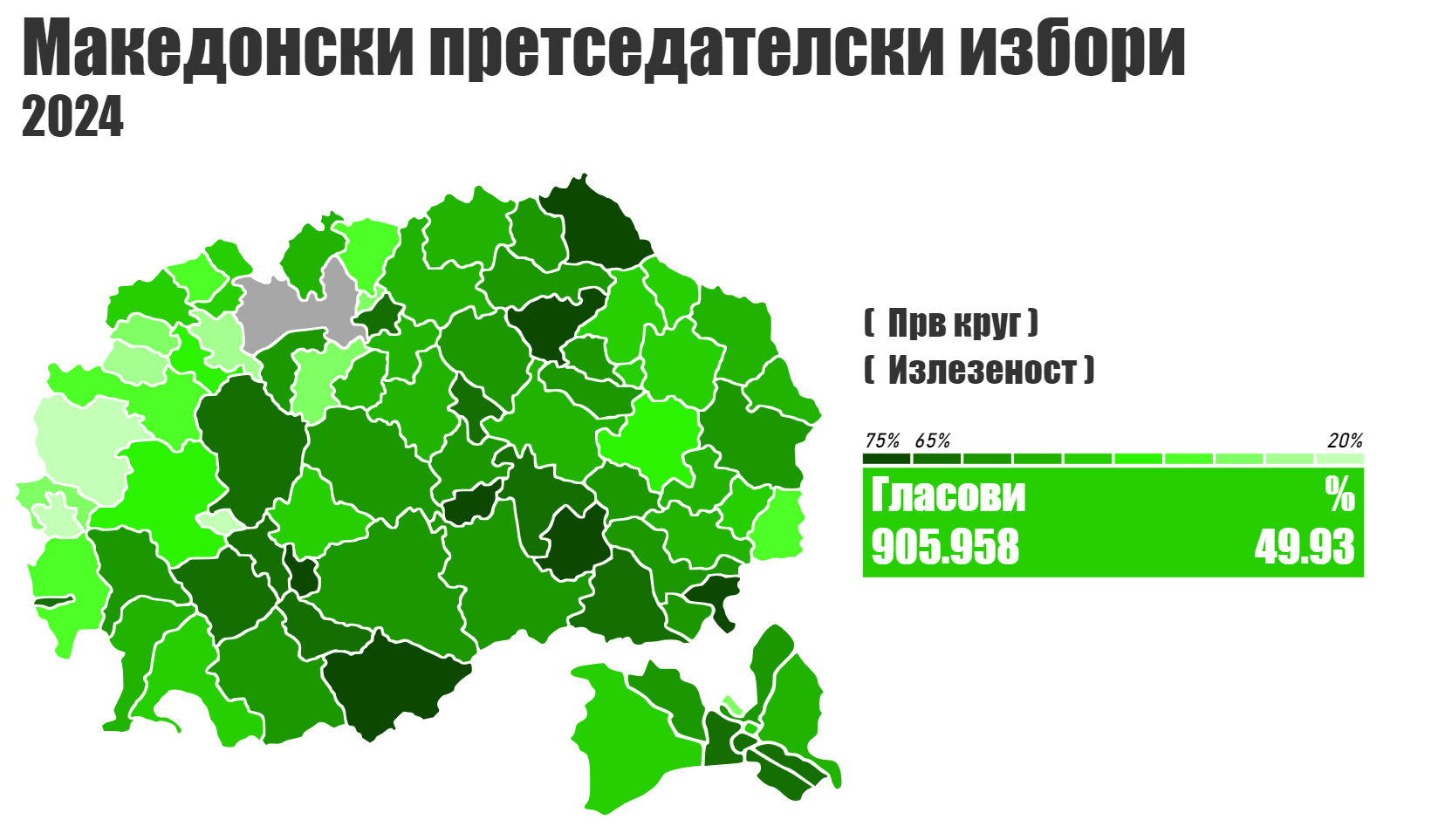
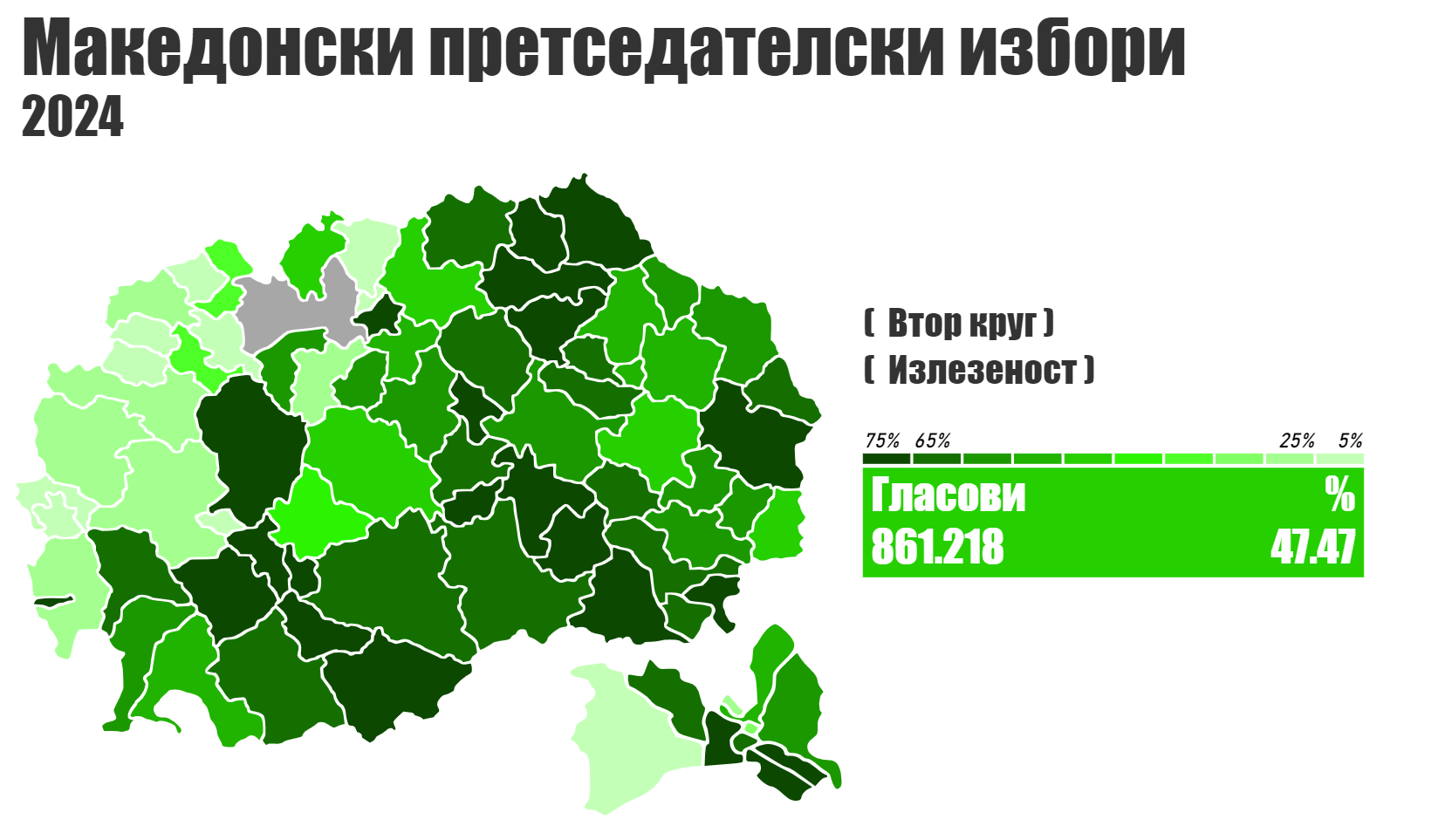
Turnout by round and municipality

Candidate	Party	First round		Second round	
Candidate	Party	Votes	%	Votes	%
Gordana Siljanovska-Davkova	VMRO-DPMNE	363,085	41.21	561,000	69.01
Stevo Pendarovski	Social Democratic Union of Macedonia	180,499	20.49	251,899	30.99
Bujar Osmani	Democratic Union for Integration	120,811	13.71		
Maksim Dimitrievski	For Our Macedonia	83,855	9.52		
Arben Taravari	Alliance for Albanians	83,337	9.46		
Biljana Vankovska	Independent (Note: Endorsed by The Left)	41,331	4.69		
Stevčo Jakimovski	Citizen Option for Macedonia	8,121	0.92		
Total		881,039	100.00	812,899	100.00
Valid votes		881,039	97.29	812,899	94.39
Invalid/blank votes		24,560	2.71	48,289	5.61
Total votes		905,599	100.00	861,188	100.00
Registered voters/turnout		1,814,317	49.91	1,814,317	47.47
Source: State Election Commission Round 1, State Election Commission Round 2

== Aftermath ==
Following the release of the results, Stevo Pendarovski conceded defeat, while Siljanovska-Davkova acknowledged her being the first woman to be elected as president of North Macedonia and pledged to "stand with women in taking this great step forward, a step towards reform."

According to international observers, the elections were "competitive and an extensive and pluralistic campaign helped voters to make an informed choice, but marred by negative rhetoric with nationalistic slogans, as well as shortcomings in the legislation and insufficient oversight of campaign finances".

== Reactions ==
- Croatia — Prime Minister Andrej Plenković congratulated Siljanovska-Davkova on her victory.
- European Union — Ambassador David Geer congratulated Gordana Siljanovska-Davkova for her election, noting that he is "looking forward to working closely with her for the European future of the country." In addition, Oliver Varhelyi, the European Commissioner for Neighbourhood and Enlargement, congratulated Siljanovska-Davkova and highlighted the need "to speed up the necessary reforms to move forward in the EU accession negotiation process."
- Hungary — Prime Minister Viktor Orbán congratulated Siljanovska-Davkova and her VMRO-DPMNE on their "well-deserved and historic victory" in the presidential and parliamentary elections. Orban added that he looked forward to working together on giving North Macedonia a "new momentum to the EU accession process".
- Serbia — President Aleksandar Vučić congratulated Siljanovska-Davkova, saying that he was "confident that we will together continue to work on strengthening Serbia-Macedonia ties".
- Ukraine — President Volodymyr Zelenskyy congratulated Siljanovska-Davkova and expressed optimism in cooperating with North Macedonia to ensure peace and stability in Europe.
- United States — Ambassador Angela Aggeler expressed her "heartfelt congratulations" to Siljanovska-Davkova on her "historic election as the first female President." She also extended her congratulations "to all those citizens who exercised their right to vote in the presidential and parliamentary elections."
