= Arben Taravari =

Macedonian politician (born 1973)

- Арбен Таравари
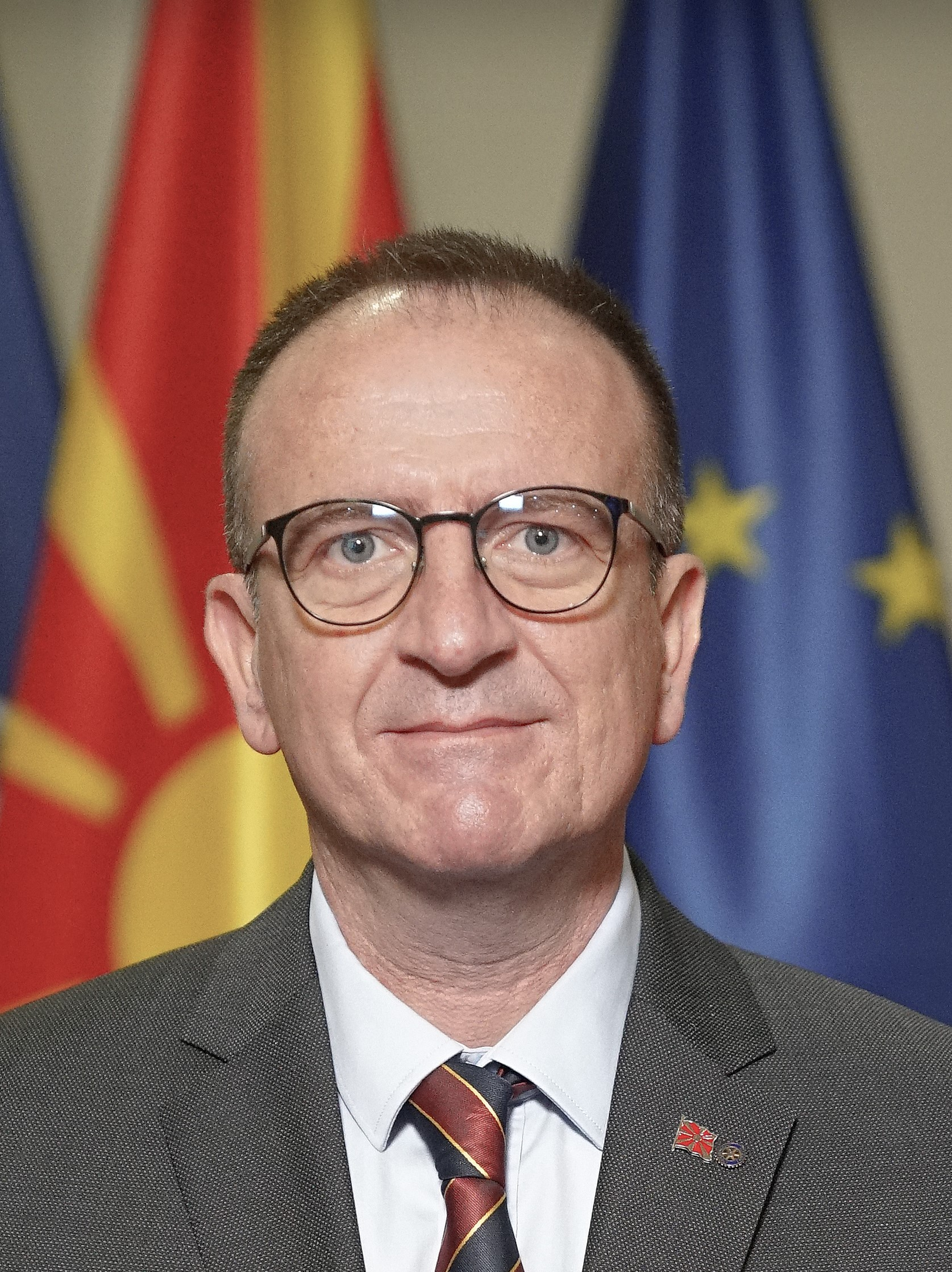
- Official portrait (2024)

Leader of Alliance for Albanians
- Incumbent
- Assumed office 24 December 2022 disputed with Ziadin Sela

Minister of Health
- In office 1 June 2017 – 31 October 2017
- Prime Minister: Zoran Zaev
- Preceded by: Nikola Todorov
- Succeeded by: Venko Filipče
- In office 23 June 2024 – 15 May 2025
- Prime Minister: Hristijan Mickoski
- Preceded by: Fatmir Mexhiti
- Succeeded by: Azir Aliu

Mayor of Gostivar
- In office 1 November 2017 – 7 July 2024
- Preceded by: Nevzat Bejta
- Succeeded by: Valbon Limani

Personal details
- Born: 9 April 1973 (age 53) Gostivar, SR Macedonia, Yugoslavia
- Party: Alliance for Albanians
- Education: Ss. Cyril and Methodius University of Skopje
- Profession: Neurologist

Arben Taravari (Macedonian: Арбен Таравари; born 9 April 1973) is a Macedonian doctor and politician. He was elected mayor of Gostivar Municipality in 2017. He served as Minister of Health in 2017, and 2024 to 2025. A member of the Alliance for Albanians, he came fifth of seven candidates in the 2024 North Macedonian presidential election.

== Biography ==
Born in Gostivar, SFR Yugoslavia, Taravari graduated from the Faculty of Medicine at the Ss. Cyril and Methodius University of Skopje in 1998. He completed his specialisms in neurology (2006) and family medicine (2011). Since 2010 he is a lecturer at his alma mater, and in 2011 he defended his thesis on Parkinson's disease.

An ethnic Albanian and member of the Alliance for Albanians, Taravari was one of two party members named in the government of Zoran Zaev starting in July 2017. He resigned in October. He was elected mayor of his hometown in 2017 and 2021.

In the 2024 North Macedonian presidential election, Taravari came fifth of seven candidates, receiving 83,393 votes (over 9%) in the first round. He had said that year that the Constitution of North Macedonia should be amended to guarantee one of the three main offices – president, prime minister, speaker of the parliament – to Albanians. He also said that Bulgarians should be recognised in the constitution, that the constitution should be revised to name the Albanian language explicitly, and for the president to be voted indirectly by parliament.

In June 2024, Taravari was named Minister of Health for a second time. He announced that the Ministry of Health would dismiss the directors of the Mother Teresa Clinical Complex. He announced his resignation on 15 May 2025. Taravari withdrew the five members of parliament of AA from the government of prime minister Hristijan Mickoski, who still retained an overall majority.

Taravari has been involved in a dispute with Ziadin Sela over the leadership of the Alliance for Albanians. Taravari wished to run in alliance with the VLEN Coalition in parliamentary and presidential elections in 2024. Sela, the chairman of the party assembly, disagreed; the fraction supporting him allied with the Democratic Union for Integration. The two sectors ran their own party congresses and re-elected their respective leaders. In February 2025, the Basic Court of Tetovo recognised Sela as the party's legitimate leader, a decision that Taravari appealed.
