= 2017 Macedonian local elections =

← 2013	October 15, 2017 (first round); October 29, 2017 (second round)	2021 →

80 municipalities and Skopje
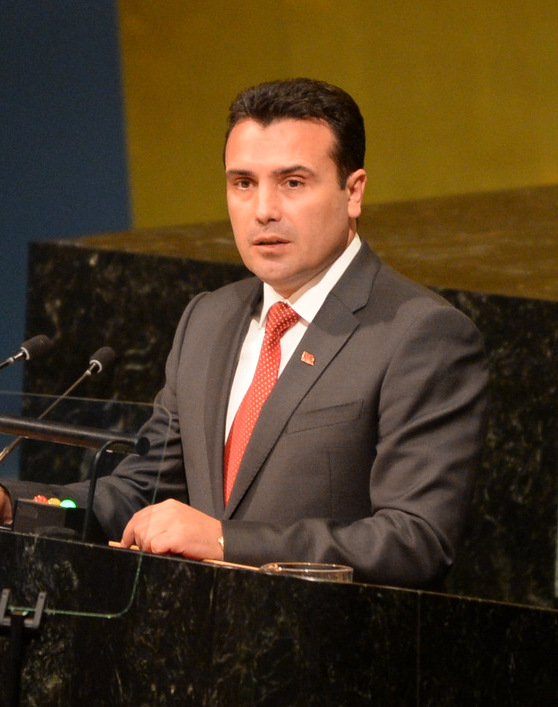

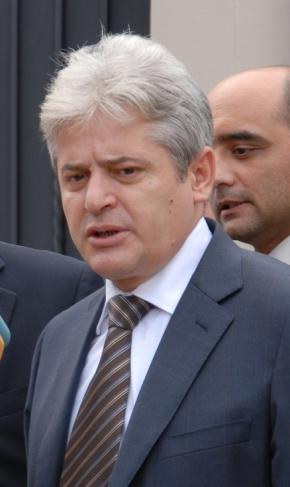

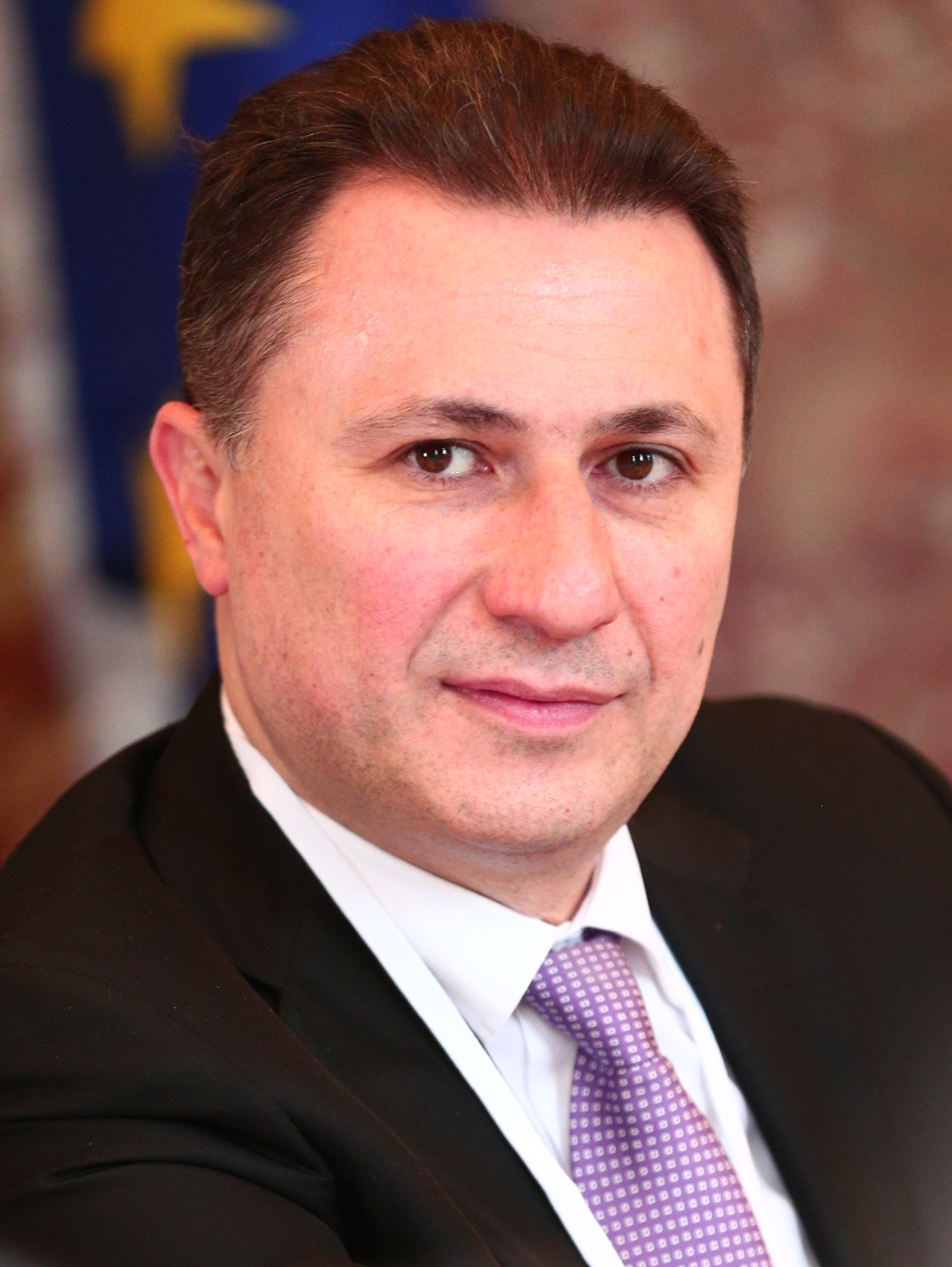

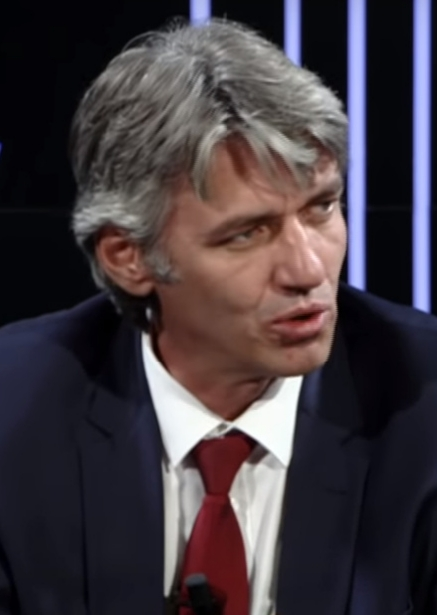

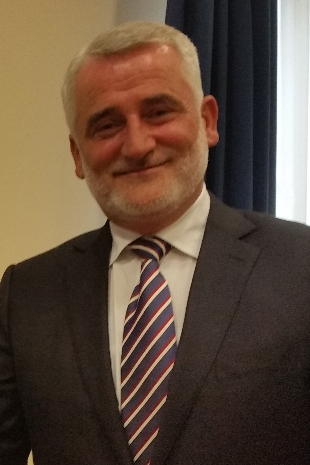
	First party	Second party	Third party
Leader	Zoran Zaev	Ali Ahmeti	Nikola Gruevski
Party	SDSM	BDI	VMRO-DPMNE
Mayoralities won	57	10	5
Change	▲53	▼4	▼51
	Fourth party	Fifth party	Sixth party
Leader	Ziadin Sela	Bilal Kasami	Menduh Thaçi
Party	ASh	Besa	PDSh
Mayoralities won	3	1	1
Change	▲3	▲1	▼1
	Seventh party	Eighth party
Leader	Beycan Ilyas
Party	DPTM	Independent
Mayoralities won	1	3
Change	Steady	▲1

Local elections were held on October 15 and 29, 2017, in the Republic of Macedonia to elect mayors and members of municipality councils of the 80 municipalities in Macedonia. These were the sixth local elections since the independence of Macedonia.

The local elections were held as scheduled, on October 15, 2017. Only 45 municipalities elected a mayor in the first round, and 35 had to vote again on October 29. Before both of the first two rounds, voting was held a day early (October 14 and 28) for hospitalized and disadvantaged persons, and those in home detention or prison. A re-vote was held on November 12 in the municipality of Čair only.

== Background ==
The Social Democratic Union of Macedonia (SDSM) formed a ruling coalition with the Democratic Union for Integration (DUI) in 2017. The Macedonian Assembly determined October 15 as the date of the elections on June 1, 2017. On August 6, Macedonian Assembly Speaker Talat Xhaferi announced that local elections would be held on October 15, 2017.

On September 27, Alit Abazi, an independent candidate for the council of Kičevo Municipality, was shot in public in Kičevo with a pistol. His chief electoral officer was wounded. Abazi succumbed to his wounds on October 5. The investigating authorities stated that there was not a political motivation and rejected relation of this event with the electoral process. Elvis Bajram, a candidate for mayor in Šuto Orizari Municipality, was attacked with axes and metal rods during a meeting with council candidates in Šuto Orizari. His father alleged that he was attacked by supporters of SDSM. The incident was condemned by SDSM and VMRO-DPMNE.

The campaign for the first round lasted from September 25 to October 13, while the campaign for the second round lasted from October 15 to October 27. VMRO-DPMNE candidates focused on national issues during the campaign. Like in the previous elections, VMRO-DPMNE did not participate in debates, arguing that receiving criticism for not appearing on TV was less harmful than being criticized live for its wrongdoings. The coalition led by SDSM openly supported DUI's candidates in municipalities, such as Čair, Tetovo, and Struga, and the municipalities of Aračinovo and Šuto Orizari with predominantly Albanian and Romani people. DUI also called its members and supporters in Skopje and Kumanovo to vote for SDSM's candidates. VMRO-DPMNE also promote itself in both Macedonian and Albanian in municipalities with mixed ethnicities. The Alliance for Albanians' (AA) campaign was ethnic-based.

There were 224 mayoral candidates for 80 municipalities and the City of Skopje, along with 373 candidate lists for councilors. Hospitalized and disadvantaged persons, as well as those in home detention or prison, voted a day before both rounds.

== Results ==

In the first round, SDSM won 37 out of 80 municipalities and had a lead in 13, while VMRO-DPMNE lost control of 56 municipalities and won in only three rural areas. VMRO-DPMNE had a slight lead in six municipalities. DUI won in only two municipalities and had a lead in 10 municipalities. Before the second round, the AA announced its alliance with Besa, while SDSM remained in alliance with DUI. The second round took place on October 29.

In both rounds, the largest number of mayoral seats was won by SDSM, consisting of 57 municipalities and the City of Skopje. VMRO-DPMNE won 5 mayoral seats, DUI - 9, AA - 3, and Besa, DPA, and DPT won one mayoral seat each, while three mayoral seats were won by independent candidates. Compared with the 2013 local elections, SDSM passed from ruling 4 municipalities to 57, while VMRO-DPMNE was reduced from 56 municipalities to only 5. Only 6 women were elected as mayors. In these elections, VMRO-DPMNE had one of its worst results in the country's electoral history.

With the re-vote on November 12, DUI won another mayoral seat in Čair. SDSM won 422,522 votes (39.1%) for members of the municipal councils, VMRO-DPMNE - 335,769 votes (31%), DUI - 89,724 votes (8.3%), AA - 49,125 (4.5%), Besa - 46,493 (4.3%), DPA - 16,865 (1.56%), DPT - 10,239 (0.9%) and NDM - 4,506 (0.4%) votes. As a result, SDSM won 552 councilor seats in total, VMRO-DPMNE - 432, DUI - 127, Besa - 63, AA - 63, DPA - 23, DPT - 17, NDM and SRM 7 councilors each. In the City of Skopje, SDSM won 122,711 votes (43.7%, VMRO-DPMNE - 96,922 votes (34.5%), DUI -17,000 (6.1%), Besa - 13,882 (4.9%), AA - 6,972 (2.4%), The Left - 5,922 (2.1%). In the first round, the total voter turnout was 1,079,876 out of 1,814,664 registered voters, 59.51%. In the second round, the turnout declined to 51.92%. Compared to the previous local elections, the turnout was significantly lower (66.81% in the first and 64.9% in the second round).

Municipality	Candidate	Party	%	Round won in
Aerodrom	Zlatko Marin	Social Democratic Union	52.03%	First round
Aračinovo	Milikije Halimi	Social Democratic Union	57.81%	First round
Berovo	Zvonko Pekevski	Social Democratic Union	60.96%	First round
Bitola	Nataša Petrovska	Social Democratic Union	59.77%	First round
Bogdanci	Blaže Šapov	Social Democratic Union	55.37%	First round
Bogovinje	Aljbon Džemaili	Alliance for Albanians	53.70%	Second round
Bosilovo	Zoran Zimbakov	Social Democratic Union	53.80%	First round
Brvenica	Enver Pajaziti	Independent	55.38%	Second round
Butel	Velimir Smilevski	Social Democratic Union	57.02%	Second round
Valandovo	Pero Kostadinov	Social Democratic Union	55.31%	First round
Vasilevo	Marjan Janev	Social Democratic Union	52.52%	First round
Vevčani	Sašo Jankoski	Social Democratic Union	53.15%	First round
Veles	Ace Kocevski	Social Democratic Union	53.51%	First round
Vinica	Ivica Dimitrov	Social Democratic Union	52.23%	Second round
Vrapčište	Isen Shabani	Alliance for Albanians	51.25%	Second round
Gazi Baba	Boris Georgievski	Social Democratic Union	53.57%	Second round
Gevgelija	Sašo Pockov	Social Democratic Union	54.55%	First round
Gjorče Petrov	Aleksandar Naumoski	Social Democratic Union	53.75%	First round
Gostivar	Arben Taravari	Alliance for Albanians	50.12%	Second round
Gradsko	Robert Bešovski	Social Democratic Union	53.51%	Second round
Debar	Ruždi Ljata	Democratic Union for Integration	52.04%	Second round
Debarca	Zoran Nogačeski	Social Democratic Union	56.70%	First round
Delčevo	Goran Trajkovski	Social Democratic Union	51.83%	First round
Demir Kapija	Lazar Petrov	Social Democratic Union	56.12%	Second round
Demir Hisar	Marjanče Stojanovski	Social Democratic Union	55.43%	First round
Dojran	Ango Angov	Social Democratic Union	58.19%	First round
Dolneni	Džemil Kjamili	Democratic Union for Integration	53.90%	Second round
Želino	Bljerim Sejdi	Besa Movement	51.27%	Second round
Zelenikovo	Borče Gievski	Social Democratic Union	59.22%	First round
Zrnovci	Blaže Stankov	VMRO-DPMNE	57.11%	Second round
Ilinden	Žika Stojanovski	VMRO-DPMNE	57.34%	First round
Jegunovce	Darko Blažeski	Social Democratic Union	61.79%	Second round
Kavadarci	Mitko Jančev	VMRO-DPMNE	52.65%	Second round
Karbinci	Jordan Nasev	Social Democratic Union	56.94%	Second round
Karpoš	Stefan Bogoev	Social Democratic Union	57.70%	First round
Kisela Voda	Filip Temelkovski	Social Democratic Union	54.89%	Second round
Kičevo	Fatmir Dehari	Democratic Union for Integration	60.36%	First round
Konče	Blagoj Iliev	Social Democratic Union	55.23%	First round
Kočani	Nikolčo Ilijev	Social Democratic Union	55.80%	First round
Kratovo	Ljupčo Bojadžiev	Social Democratic Union	57.11%	First round
Kriva Palanka	Borjančo Micevski	Social Democratic Union	57.97%	First round
Krivogaštani	Rubinčo Šefteroski	Social Democratic Union	53.90%	First round
Kruševo	Tome Hristoski	Social Democratic Union	60.63%	First round
Kumanovo	Maksim Dimitrievski	Social Democratic Union	52.53%	First round
Lipkovo	Erkan Arifi	Democratic Union for Integration	58.55%	Second round
Lozovo	Aco Velkovski	Social Democratic Union	55.18%	First round
Mavrovo and Rostuša	Medat Kurtovski	Social Democratic Union	55.85%	First round
Makedonska Kamenica	Sonja Stamenkova	Social Democratic Union	54.24%	Second round
Makedonski Brod	Živko Siljanoski	Social Democratic Union	66.46%	Second round
Mogila	Jasmina Gulevska	Social Democratic Union	51.22%	Second round
Negotino	Toni Delkov	Social Democratic Union	51.44%	First round
Novaci	Ljube Kuzmanoski	Social Democratic Union	53.00%	Second round
Novo Selo	Boro Stojčev	Social Democratic Union	52.13%	First round
Ohrid	Jovan Stojanoski	Social Democratic Union	54.07%	First round
Petrovec	Borče Mitevski	VMRO-DPMNE	62.05%	First round
Pehčevo	Dragan Trenčovski	Social Democratic Union	52.65%	First round
Plasnica	Ismail Jahoski	Democratic Union for Integration	59.12%	First round
Prilep	Ilija Jovanoski	Social Democratic Union	51.07%	First round
Probištip	Dragan Anastasov	Social Democratic Union	52.27%	Second round
Radoviš	Gerasim Konzulov	Social Democratic Union	50.13%	First round
Rankovce	Ivica Toševski	Independent	58.27%	First round
Resen	Živko Gošarevski	Social Democratic Union	55.03%	First round
Rosoman	Branko Janev	Social Democratic Union	54.23%	Second round
Saraj	Blerim Bedžeti	Democratic Union for Integration	52.26%	Second round
Sveti Nikole	Sašo Velkovski	Social Democratic Union	50.17%	First round
Skopje	Petre Šilegov	Social Democratic Union	50.33%	First round
Sopište	Stefče Trpkovski	VMRO-DPMNE	50.78%	First round
Staro Nagoričane	Žaklina Jovanovska	Social Democratic Union	65.36%	Second round
Struga	Ramis Merko	Democratic Union for Integration	49.53%	Second round
Strumica	Kosta Janevski	Social Democratic Union	59.45%	First round
Studeničani	Azem Sadiki	Democratic Party of Albanians	52.17%	Second round
Tearce	Isen Asani	Democratic Union for Integration	51.64%	Second round
Tetovo	Teuta Arifi	Democratic Union for Integration	49.09%	Second round
Centar	Saša Bogdanovikj	Social Democratic Union	63.47%	First round
Centar Župa	Arijan Ibraim	Democratic Party of Turks	70.48%	First round
Čair	Visar Ganiu	Democratic Union for Integration	48.66%	Second round
Čaška	Goran Stojanovski	Social Democratic Union	69.58%	Second round
Češinovo-Obleševo	Gorančo Krstev	Social Democratic Union	49.91%	Second round
Čučer-Sandevo	Jovan Pejkovski	Independent	51.40%	First round
Štip	Blagoj Bočvarski	Social Democratic Union	51.54%	Second round
Šuto Orizari	Kurto Duduš	Social Democratic Union	57.61%	Second round

== Incidents and reactions ==
After the first round, OSCE stated:

The elections took place in a competitive environment, with candidates generally able to campaign without restriction, and the fundamental freedoms of assembly and expression were respected overall. Some credible allegations of vote-buying, pressure on voters and isolated cases of violence occurred during the pre-election period. The monitored media provided unbiased coverage of contestants and facilitated the opportunity for political debate. Although some procedural irregularities were observed, election day generally proceeded in an orderly fashion.

Following the second round, it stated: "The second round of mayoral elections in the former Yugoslav Republic of Macedonia were competitive and respect for fundamental freedoms contributed towards conduct of democratic elections."

A voter in Gjorče Petrov was arrested on October 15 for photographing the ballot, which caused a break in voting for five minutes. During the voting, the police said it received 46 reports about attempted voter bribery, chain voting and other attempts of obstructions. They said they arrested 10 people due to these reports. An NGO activist from Struga, who commented about AA and Ziadin Sela on social media, was threatened with death and beaten, if he did not cease his activity. In the first round, there were ten photographing incidents. In the second round, there were photographing incidents in Šuto Orizari, Crniče and Probištip. People were also arrested for participating in physical showdowns in Šuto Orizari and Butel. Polling stations were briefly closed until the situations were sorted out.

SDSM and DUI evaluated the elections as fair and democratic. VMRO-DPMNE evaluated the elections as a violation against all regulations and complained of electoral fraud. Before the end of voting in the first round, Besa made allegations about attempts at disrupting the election process, buying of votes, irregularities in polling stations, as well as attempts at causing incidents, but without an effect on the results. After his defeat in Tetovo, Bilal Kasami of Besa stated that DUI won with the help of SDSM’s votes and asked for early parliamentary elections. Former VMRO-DPMNE leader and prime minister, Nikola Gruevski, said that he does not recognize the election as free and democratic, and asked for an early parliamentary election. AA made accusations about electoral irregularities, pressure from the government, and criminal elections. After losing in Struga, the city's former mayor Sela said that he does not recognize the result and called DUI to a showdown at an early parliamentary election. Arben Taravari, who won a mayoral seat in Gostivar, accused the interior minister Oliver Spasovski of pressuring voters, such as by calling people and encouraging them to vote for DUI. Spasovski rejected the accusations.

Objections and lawsuits about the voting procedure were filed by opposition parties to the State Election Commission (SEC) and the Administrative Court for the first and second round. All objections were rejected by SEC. A lawsuit by Besa was accepted by the court, which led to a re-vote in the polling station 2901 in the municipality of Čair. During the re-vote in the polling station in the municipality of Čair, Besa accused DUI of sending people to intimidate the citizens and pressure them to not participate in the re-vote. They accused them of taking the identity cards of the inhabitants living in the areas covered by the polling station, so that they would not be able to vote. After the re-vote, Besa congratulated DUI's candidate on the victory, but alleged that it was a stolen victory, with intimidation and extortion.
