= 2019 North Macedonian presidential election =

← 2014	21 April 2019 (first round); 5 May 2019 (second round)	2024 →
- Turnout: 41.67% (first round); 46.65% (second round)
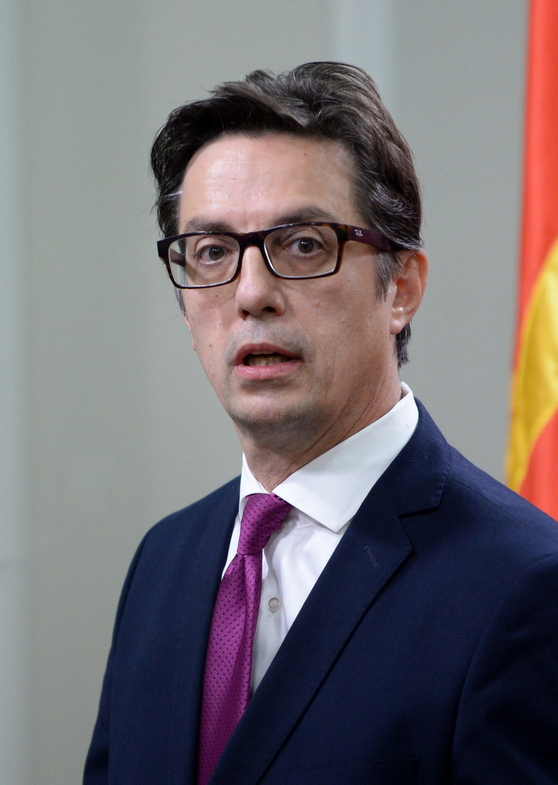

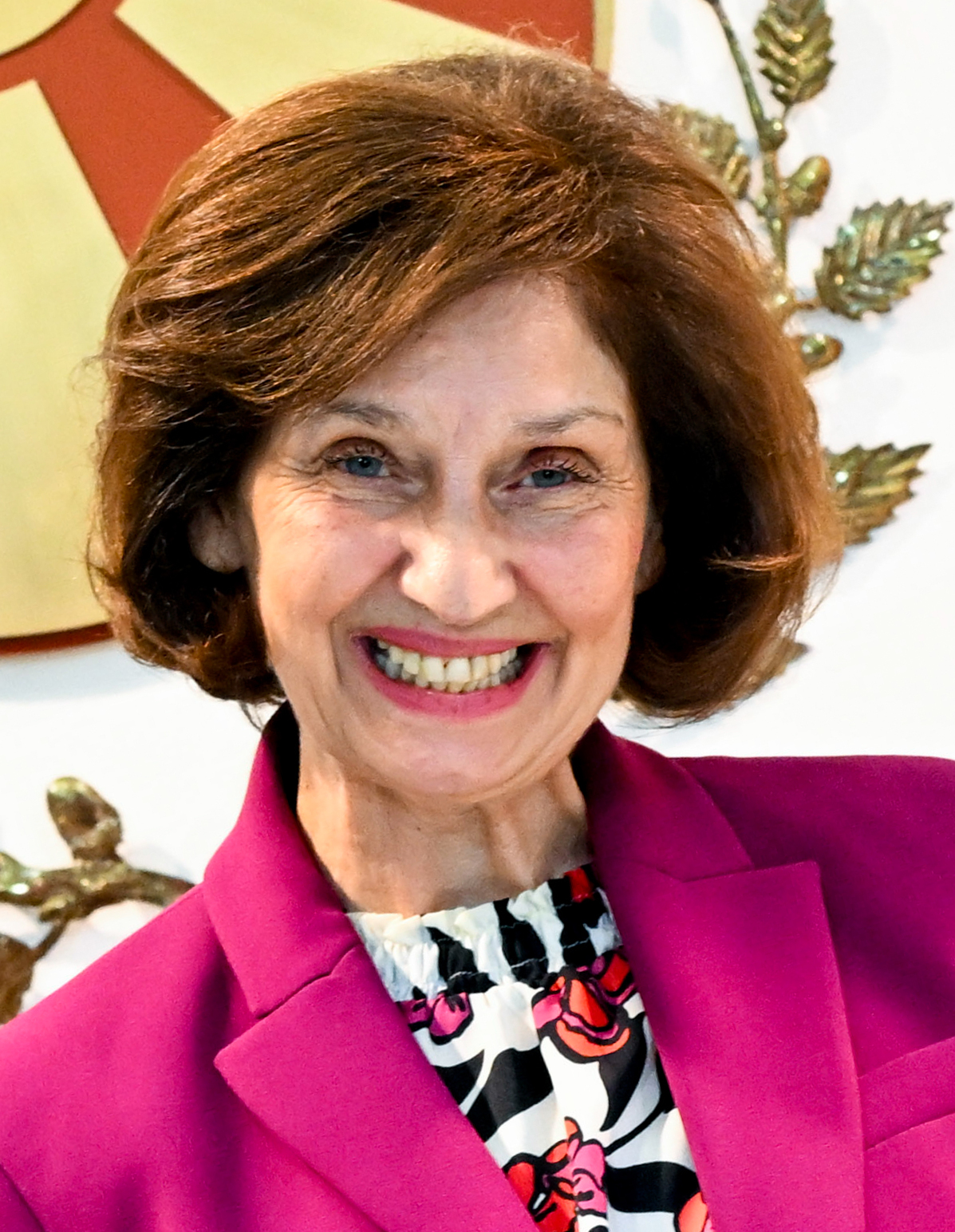
Nominee	Stevo Pendarovski	Gordana Siljanovska
Party	SDSM	VMRO-DPMNE
Popular vote	435,656	377,446
Percentage	53.58%	46.42%
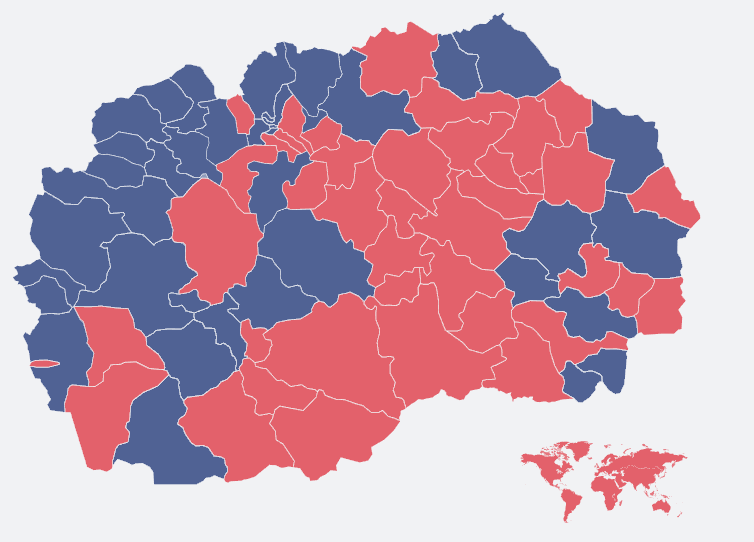
- Second round results by municipality
President before election
Gjorge Ivanov
VMRO-DPMNE
Elected President
Stevo Pendarovski
SDSM

Presidential elections were held in North Macedonia in 2019. Three candidates were on the ballot in the first round, held on 21 April: Stevo Pendarovski, supported by the ruling coalition led by the Social Democratic Union of Macedonia, including the Democratic Union for Integration; Gordana Siljanovska-Davkova of the leading opposition party VMRO-DPMNE, and Blerim Reka, an independent supported by Albanian opposition parties Alliance for Albanians and Besa Movement. The first round did not result in an absolute majority for any candidate, with Pendarovski receiving the most votes. In the second round held on 5 May, Pendarovski defeated Siljanovska-Davkova with 54% of the vote.

Incumbent President Gjorge Ivanov was constitutionally barred from seeking a third term in office, having previously been elected in 2009 and 2014.

== Background ==
The elections were the first in North Macedonia after the Prespa agreement on the naming dispute, signed on 17 June 2018. A referendum was held on 30 September, in which a majority of voters approved the agreement, although turnout was far below the quorum required to validate the result, mainly because of an organized boycott of the Anti-Prespa agreement bloc. The Assembly subsequently approved the change of the country's name to "North Macedonia" on 11 January 2019, and Greece subsequently ratified the agreement and the accession protocol for NATO.

Incumbent President Gjorge Ivanov was a vocal opponent of the name change and refused to sign the laws and amendments on the matter. However, Assembly Speaker Talat Xhaferi claimed that his signature was enough to enforce the change.

The name change had the support of the government coalition formed by the Social Democrats (SDSM) and the ethnic Albanian Democratic Union for Integration. The nationalist VMRO-DPMNE coalition led by Hristijan Mickoski was in favor of NATO integration but against the name change, although the change was approved in the Assembly with at least four VMRO-DPMNE MPs voting in favour.

After her nomination, VMRO-DPMNE candidate Gordana Siljanovska-Davkova had promised to initiate a second referendum and restore the old name to the country if she won.

== Electoral system ==
The President of North Macedonia is elected using a modified two-round system; a candidate can only be elected in the first round of voting if they receive the equivalent of over 50% of the vote from all registered voters. In the second round, voter turnout must be at least 40% for the result to be deemed valid. Before 2009, the constitution required turnout in the second round to be 50% to validate the result. However, the XXXI amendment approved on 9 January 2009 lowered the threshold to 40%, as the then-government feared the trend of reducing turnouts would lead to presidential elections being frequently invalidated. In the 2009 presidential elections, second round turnout was just 42.6%.

The constitution mandates that the President must be over 40 years of age and have lived in the country for ten of the last fifteen years.

== Opinion polls ==
Before and between the voting rounds, several opinion polls were conducted. The percentages of the polls below are related to only those voters who declared that they would vote for a certain candidate.

First round

Date(s) conducted	Polling firm/Client	Sample size/Type	Pendarovski/SDSM	Siljanovska/VMRO-DPMNE	Reka/AA, Besa	Lead
8-14 Apr 2019	Rating Agency	1,112/Face-to-face	45.5	39.5	15.0	6.0
7-11 Apr 2019	IDSCS/Telma&MCMS	967/Telephone	44.1	38.1	17.8	6.0
4-10 Apr 2019	M-Prospect/MRT	1,197/Telephone	43.2	38.8	18.0	4.4
10 Mar-10 Apr 2019	Samerimpex Impulses/MCMS	1,147/Online	50.4	41.4	8.2	9.0
23-27 Mar 2019	IPIS/Sitel	1,110/Telephone	45.9	42.7	11.3	3.2
13-19 Mar 2019	M-Prospect/Telma&MCMS	1,001/Telephone	42.9	38.4	18.7	4.5

Second round

Date(s) conducted	Polling firm/Client	Sample size/Type	Pendarovski/SDSM	Siljanovska/VMRO-DPMNE	Lead
13-19 Mar 2019	M-Prospect/Telma&MCMS	1,001/Telephone	55.3	44.7	10.6

== Results ==
To win in the first round, a candidate would have had to receive at least 904,066 votes, equivalent to 50% of the number of registered voters.

Candidate	Party	First round		Second round	
Candidate	Party	Votes	%	Votes	%
Stevo Pendarovski	Social Democratic Union of Macedonia	322,581	44.75	435,656	53.58
Gordana Siljanovska-Davkova	VMRO-DPMNE	318,341	44.16	377,446	46.42
Blerim Reka	Independent	79,888	11.08		
Total		720,810	100.00	813,102	100.00
Valid votes		720,810	95.66	813,102	96.40
Invalid/blank votes		32,697	4.34	30,406	3.60
Total votes		753,507	100.00	843,508	100.00
Registered voters/turnout		1,808,131	41.67	1,808,131	46.65
Source: OCSE
