= Villa Vodno =

Presidential office building in Skopje

- Вила Водно
- Interactive map of the Villa Vodno area

General information
- Location: Skopje, North Macedonia
- Coordinates: 41.9857°N 21.4140°E
- Current tenants: President of North Macedonia
- Construction started: 2004
- Completed: 2008
- Cost: Approximately €5 million

Technical details
- Floor area: c. 2,500 m^{2} (27,000 sq ft)

Villa Vodno (Macedonian: Вила Водно), also known as the Annex (Macedonian: Анекс), is the official workplace of the President of North Macedonia. It stands in the foothills of Vodno at the southern edge of Skopje. Built from 2004, it became the seat of the presidency in 2009 and houses the president's office and rooms for meetings and receptions.

Construction began in 2004. The complex covers about 2,500 m^{2} (27,000 sq ft) and combines a renovated older state villa with a newly built annex, arranged over a ground floor and a multi-level upper storey; about €5 million from the state budget was spent on the new section. It contains the president's office, working premises for the presidential services, and rooms for meetings and receptions. The surrounding park was planted with cypresses, firs and other evergreens, together with lawns and flower gardens. The building hosts sessions of the national Security Council and ceremonies for the presentation of credentials by foreign ambassadors.

The working residence is separate from the villa in which the president lives, about 3 km (1.9 mi) away. When the presidential offices moved to Villa Vodno in 2009, the rooms they had previously used in the Sobranie Palace were handed over to the parliamentary services.

The presidential offices contain two mosaic friezes by the painter Gligor Čemerski, Macedonia, a Warm Country (Македонија топла земја) and The Earth Remembers (Земјата памети), produced in 2006.

Villa Vodno has hosted visiting heads of state and foreign delegations, including Hamad bin Khalifa Al Thani, Bronisław Komorowski, Viktor Orbán, Ivo Josipović, Filip Vujanović, Valdis Zatlers, Stjepan Mesić, Roman Herzog, Zhelyu Zhelev, Bamir Topi, Tony Blair, Edi Rama, Borut Pahor, Václav Klaus and Kiro Gligorov.
