= Gordana Siljanovska-Davkova =

President of North Macedonia since 2024

- Гордана Сиљановска-Давкова
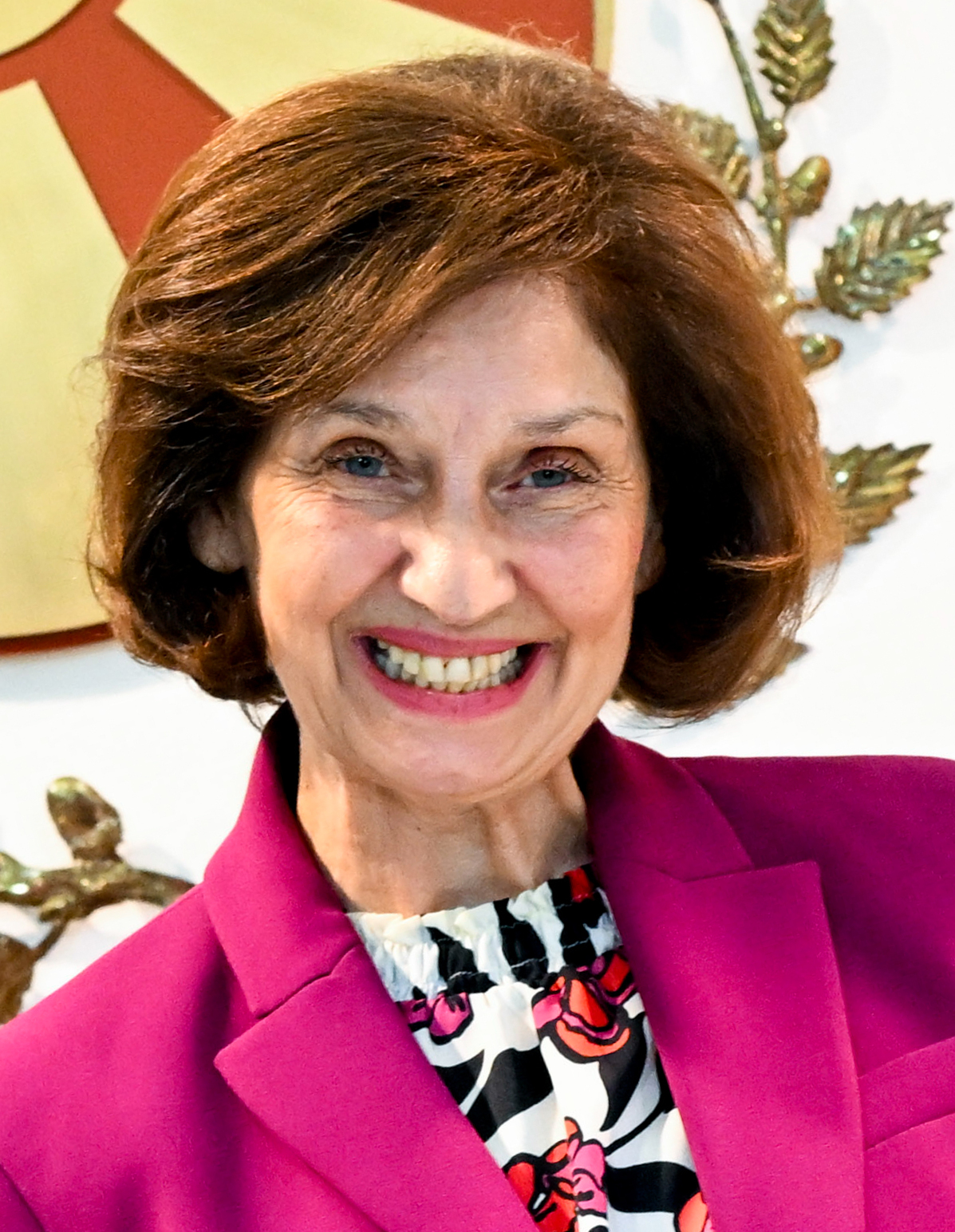
- Siljanovska-Davkova in 2025

President of North Macedonia
- Incumbent
- Assumed office 12 May 2024
- Prime Minister: Talat Xhaferi; Hristijan Mickoski
- Preceded by: Stevo Pendarovski

Member of the Assembly of North Macedonia
- In office 4 August 2020 – 12 May 2024
- Constituency: I electoral district

Minister without portfolio
- In office 17 August 1992 – 20 December 1994
- Prime Minister: Branko Crvenkovski

Member of the Constitutional Commission of the Assembly of the Republic of Macedonia
- In office 25 November 1990 – 17 August 1992

Personal details
- Born: Gordana Siljanovska; 11 May 1953 (age 73) Ohrid, PR Macedonia, Yugoslavia
- Party: VMRO-DPMNE
- Spouse: Blagoja Davkov
- Children: 2
- Education: Ss. Cyril and Methodius University in Skopje; University of Ljubljana (PhD)
- Occupation: Jurist, university law professor, politician

Gordana Siljanovska-Davkova (Macedonian: Гордана Сиљановска-Давкова; born 11 May 1953) is a Macedonian university law professor and jurist serving as the president of North Macedonia since May 2024. She was a candidate for the 2019 presidential elections, losing to Stevo Pendarovski in the runoff. She ran again in the 2024 presidential elections and defeated Pendarovski by a landslide in a rematch election. She is North Macedonia's first female president.

== Early life and education ==
Gordana Siljanovska-Davkova was born on 11 May 1953, in Ohrid, Socialist Macedonia, Yugoslavia (now North Macedonia). She completed her primary and secondary education in Skopje. She graduated from the Faculty of Law at the Ss. Cyril and Methodius University of Skopje in 1978, where she also received her master's degree. She defended her thesis, titled Local Self-Government — Between Norms and Reality, at the University of Ljubljana and earned her PhD degree in 1994.

== Career ==
She became an assistant professor of political systems at the Faculty of Law in Skopje in 1989, and an associate professor of constitutional law and political systems in 1994. She became a full professor in 2004, and ever since she has taught courses on constitutional law, political systems, and contemporary political systems and local self-government. She was a member of the Constitutional Commission of the Assembly of the Republic of Macedonia (1990–1992) and minister without portfolio in the first cabinet of Branko Crvenkovski (1992–1994). She was also a UN expert and vice president of the Independent Local Self-Government Group of the Council of Europe. She served as a member of the Venice Commission (2008–2016), where she served in the Sub-Commissions on Democratic Institutions, Judiciary, Latin America, and the Council for Constitutional Justice. She is the author of about 200 scientific papers on constitutional law and the political system.

In VMRO-DPMNE's conference at Struga, she was nominated as the candidate for the party in the presidential elections of 2019. After her nomination, she promised that if she won, she would initiate a second referendum and restore the old name to the country. She was defeated by Stevo Pendarovski.

Siljanovska ran again for president in the 2024 elections. This time, she defeated the incumbent Pendarovski by a wide margin and became the first woman to be elected as president of North Macedonia.

A few days before her inauguration, Siljanovska spoke out in favor of revision of the Good Neighborhood Agreement with Bulgaria from 2017 and against the inclusion of the Bulgarians in the country's constitution, which is a condition without which North Macedonia cannot become a member of the EU. On this occasion, the Bulgarian acting Prime Minister Dimitar Glavchev stated that Bulgaria will not make any more compromises with North Macedonia. President Rumen Radev answered that it is necessary to change the Macedonian constitution and to respect the rights of the Bulgarians, as well as to stop the hate speech against Bulgaria there.

== Presidency (2024–present) ==
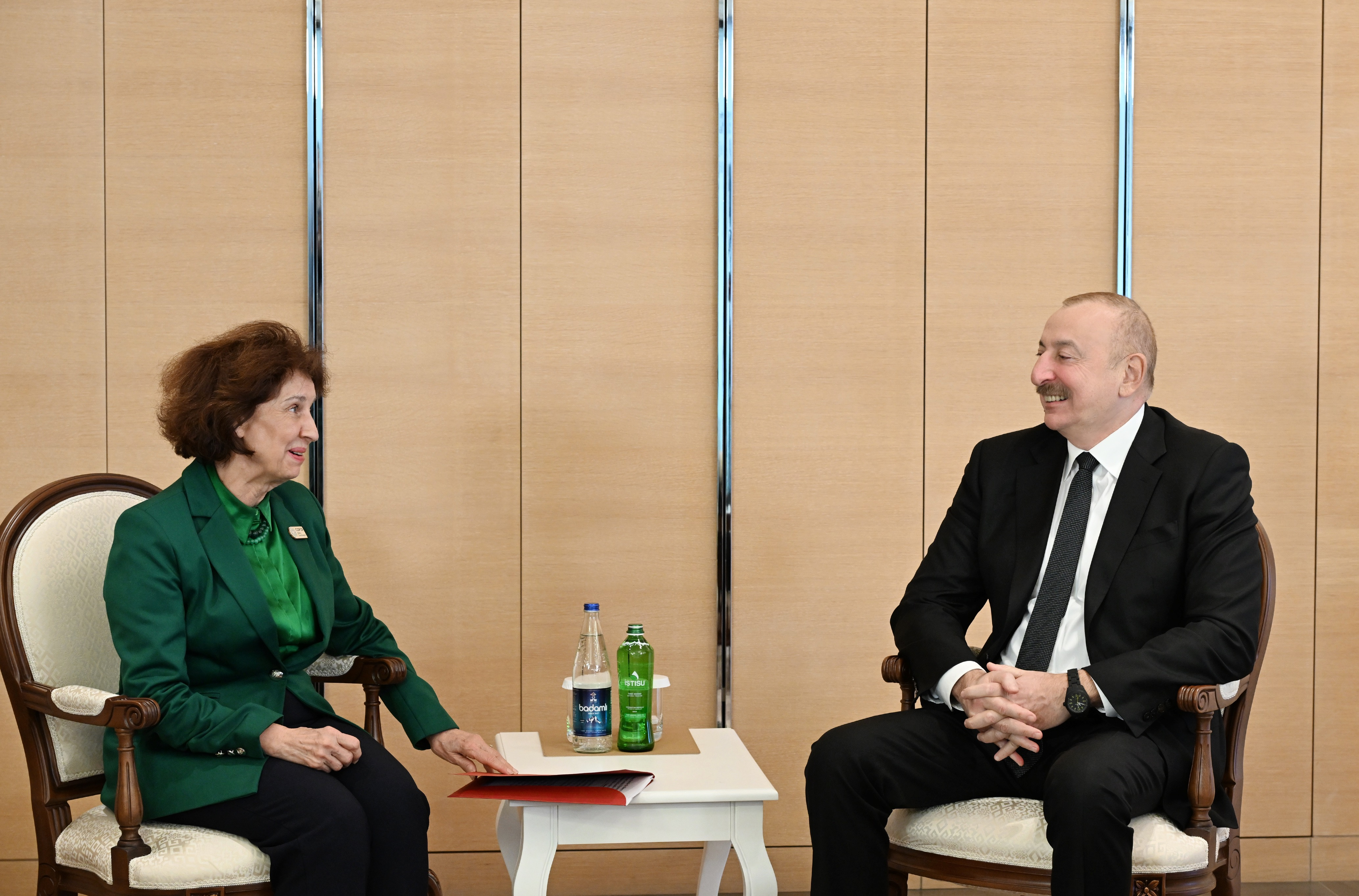
Siljanovska-Davkova with Azerbaijani President Ilham Aliyev, 10 November 2024

Siljanovska was inaugurated as President on 12 May 2024. During her inaugural address, she pledged to "feminize" and "Europeanize" the country and emphasized the role of women in North Macedonia; however, she caused controversy when she referred to her country as "Macedonia", rather than its official name of "North Macedonia". This prompted the Greek ambassador Sophia Philippidou to walk out in protest. The Greek foreign ministry subsequently said that Siljanovska's actions were a violation of the Prespa Agreement and jeopardized relations between the two countries as well as North Macedonia's accession to the European Union, while Prime Minister Kyriakos Mitsotakis called the remarks "illegal and unacceptable". The President of the EU Commission, Ursula von der Leyen also rebuked Siljanovska-Davkova's choice of words, conditioning North Macedonia's prospects for joining the EU on the respect of the Prespa Agreement, after congratulating her for her new position. In response to the reactions, her office announced that she would respect the country's international obligations but said that she had "the right to use the name Macedonia as a personal right of self-identification."

After the VMRO-DPMNE gained a plurality of seats in the Assembly of North Macedonia following the 2024 North Macedonian parliamentary election, Siljanovska-Davkova asked VMRO-DPMNE leader Hristijan Mickoski to form a new government on 6 June.

== Personal life and views ==
She is married to Blagoja Davkov and has two children. Her husband Blagoja is a lawyer and they have been living together for over 40 years.

During the collapse of Yugoslavia in 1990, Davkova's position was in favor of its preservation and against the idea about the independence of Macedonia, calling it "folly". From 2017–2018, as a public figure, she opposed the adoption of the Albanian language extension law. She considers the Prespa agreement signed between Greece and North Macedonia to resolve the Macedonia naming dispute a "violation of national law" and a "serious violation of the collective and individual human rights of the citizens of Macedonia." She is against the Good Neighborhood Agreement signed with Bulgaria which Davkova considers non-reciprocal, and is against the recognition of the Bulgarians in North Macedonia as an official ethnic minority, which is a requirement set by the EU for the country to become a member of the bloc.

Political offices
Preceded by Stevo Pendarovski	President of North Macedonia; 2024–present	Incumbent
