= Ziadin Sela =

Politician from North Macedonia

- Зијадин Села
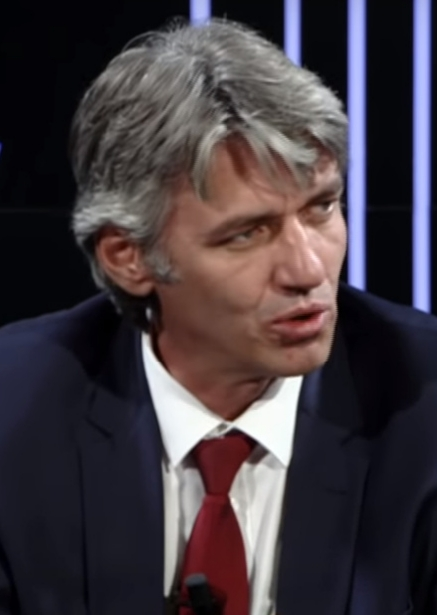

Leader of Alliance for Albanians
- In office March 2015 – December 2022
- Incumbent
- Assumed office February 2024 disputed with Arben Taravari

Mayor of Struga
- In office 2013–2017
- Preceded by: Ramiz Merko
- Succeeded by: Ramiz Merko

Personal details
- Born: 1 November 1972 (age 52); Struga, SR Macedonia, Yugoslavia
- Political party: Alliance for Albanians
- Profession: Internal Medicine Specialist, politician

Ziadin Sela (Macedonian: Зијадин Села; born 1 November 1972 in the village of Livada in Struga) is an Albanian politician and former chair of the Alliance for Albanians party in North Macedonia.
