= Citizen Option for Macedonia =

Liberal political party in North Macedonia

Citizen Option for Macedonia Граѓанска опција за Македонија
- Leader: Stevčo Jakimovski
- Secretary-General: Krste Petrevski
- Founded: 2013
- Split from: Social Democratic Union of Macedonia
- Headquarters: Skopje
- Ideology: Liberalism
- Political position: Centre
- National affiliation: Brave for Macedonia, Experience for Success
- Colours: Cyan (customary)
- Parliament: 0 / 120
- Mayors: 0 / 81
- Local councils: 2 / 1,333
- Skopje city council: 0 / 45

Website
- www.grom.mk

The Citizen Option for Macedonia (Macedonian: Граѓанска опција за Македонија, Gragjanska оpcija za Makedonija), abbr. ГРОМ/GROM (lit. 'thunder'), is a political party in North Macedonia led by Stevčo Jakimovski, former mayor of Karpoš.

== History ==
The party was established by Stevčo Jakimovski in May 2013 after he left the Social Democratic Union in protest at its planned boycott of the 2013 local elections. It nominated Zoran T. Popovski as its presidential candidate for the 2014 general elections, with Popovski finishing fourth out of four candidates with 3.61% of the vote.

In the parliamentary elections GROM led an alliance under its own name, including the Liberal Party, the Serbian Progressive Party in Macedonia, the Union of Tito's Left Forces, and the Party of Free Democrats. The alliance received 2.8% of the vote, winning one seat in the Assembly.

The party nominated a presidential candidate for the first time for the 2024 elections, with Jakimovski running for the presidency. He received 1% of the vote.

== Election results ==
=== Presidential elections ===
Election	Candidate	First round		Second round		Result
Election	Candidate	Votes	%	Votes	%	Result
2024	Stevčo Jakimovski	8,121	0.92%	—N/a	—N/a	Lost ✗
