= Alliance for Albanians =

Ethnic Albanian party in North Macedonia

Alliance for the Albanians Aleanca për Shqiptarët
- Abbreviation: ASH; AA
- Leader: Arben Taravari
- Founded: 2015; 11 years ago
- Headquarters: Skopje
- Ideology: Albanian minority rights Conservatism; Social conservatism Decentralisation; Pro-Europeanism
- Political position: Centre-right
- Colours: Purple, Gold
- Assembly: 3 / 120
- Mayors: 2 / 81

Website
- www.aleanca.eu

The Alliance for the Albanians (Albanian: Aleanca për Shqiptarët, ASH; Macedonian: Алијанса за Албанците, romanized: Alijansa za Albancite, AA) is a centre-right political party founded in 2015 in North Macedonia by Ziadin Sela.

The party has as its main goal the achievement of the full national equality between Albanians and Macedonians in all fields, from investments, to institutional representation, fair access to state institutions, employment, infrastructure and increase of the level of national awareness.

Alliance for the Albanians claims to support a multi-ethnic, European, democratic, and social governance model that could guarantee a better life for all citizens, which it considers a precondition for sustainable economic development and political stability.

The fundamental principles of its political platform are the full equality between communities, the rule of law, a social welfare state, merit based and transparent recruitment in the state administration and the prevention of the emigration of educated young professionals and the Albanians in general from the country.

== History ==
Following disagreement with the leadership of the Albanian Democratic Party on the reform needs within the party, Ziadin Sela with a broad basis of support within the party, initiated from his hometown of Struga the Movement for Reforms in the Albanian Democratic Party in March 2015.

=== Foundation and ideology ===
Later in 2015 the Movement for Reforms in the Albanian Democratic Party was registered as a political party with the same name, led by Ziadin Sela.

The newly established Movement for Reforms in the Albanian Democratic Party had as its main goal the achievement of the full national equality between Albanians and Macedonians in all fields, from investments, to institutional representation, fair access to state institutions, employment, infrastructure and increase of the level of national awareness.

In the course of 2016, the Movement for Reforms in the Albanian Democratic Party adopted the Alliance for the Albanians as its official name.

This change would be confirmed in March 2018, when the Alliance for the Albanians held its inaugural congress, Ziadin Sela was elected as President of the party.

The Alliance for the Albanians also adopted its updated Statute and the Political Platform of the Alliance for the Albanians 2018–2022 at its first congress.

=== Electoral results ===
==== 2016 parliamentary election ====
In the run up to the early parliamentary elections of 11 December 2016, the Movement for Reforms in the Albanian Democratic Party joined forces with two smaller parties, Unity and the Democratic National Renaissance, under a pre-electoral coalition named the Alliance for the Albanians. The Alliance for the Albanians emerged as the third largest force among Albanian political parties with 16.6% of the Albanian vote and three MPs in the Assembly of the Republic of North Macedonia.

==== 2017 local election ====
The Alliance for the Albanians ran for the first time at the municipal level in Macedonia at the November 2017 local election. The campaign was marked by significant tensions with government partners, SDSM and DUI which had entered into coalitions against the Alliance for the Albanians in all municipalities inhabited by Albanians.

The Alliance for the Albanians won the race for Mayors of Gostivar, Bogovinje and Vrapciste, while also winning 64 municipal councillor seats across the country.

==== 2019 presidential election ====
The Alliance for the Albanians, together with the Movement Besa, supported the candidacy of Blerim Reka, an independent Albanian candidate. Three candidates were on the ballot in the first round: Stevo Pendarovski of the ruling Social Democratic Union of Macedonia, Gordana Siljanovska-Davkova of the opposition VMRO-DPMNE party.

Blerim Reka came out third in the first round, with 79,888 votes, or 11.08% of overall votes.

In the second round, won by Stevo Pendarovksi, the Alliance for the Albanians didn't officially support any candidate.

==== 2020 parliamentary election ====
The Alliance for the Albanians ran for the 15 July 2020 early parliamentary election in a pre-electoral coalition with the Alternative under the motto "Time is Now!" and a joint programme "A State for All". The coalition won 12 seats, out of which 8 went to the Alliance for the Albanians and 4 to the Alternative.

== Governance ==
=== Central government ===
Following the 11 December 2016, general election, the Alliance for the Albanians, in close coordination with international actors in Macedonia, played a major role in reaching the 61 MPs needed to form a new majority and end the two-year long political crisis that followed the wiretapping scandal involving key figures of the decade long VMRO-DPMNE – Democratic Union for Integration regime.

The Alliance for the Albanians participated in the new government with the Ministry of Health as well as Deputy Ministers for Foreign Affairs, Transport and Communications, and Labour and Social Policy. In the first few months of the new government, the Alliance for the Albanians led by example in implementing a solid reform strategy, putting accountability, transparency and inclusiveness at the centre of government action.

Arben Taravari, Minister of Health for the Alliance for the Albanians, was confirmed by a September 2017 poll of the International Republican Institute as the cabinet minister enjoying the biggest political support with 25%, even ahead of the Prime Minister.

=== Local government ===
The Alliance for the Albanians have been governing the municipalities of Gostivar, Bogovinje and Vrapciste since October 2017, in a transparent and accountable way.

The municipality of Gostivar, led by Arben Taravari, has been leading among majority Albanian municipalities in various transparency indexes released by NGOs and international development agencies.

== Election results ==
=== Presidential elections ===
Election	Party candidate	Votes	%	Votes	%	Result
Election	Party candidate	First round		Second round		Result
2024	Arben Taravari	83,337	9.46%	—N/a	—N/a	Lost ✗
