= Stevčo Jakimovski =

Macedonian politician

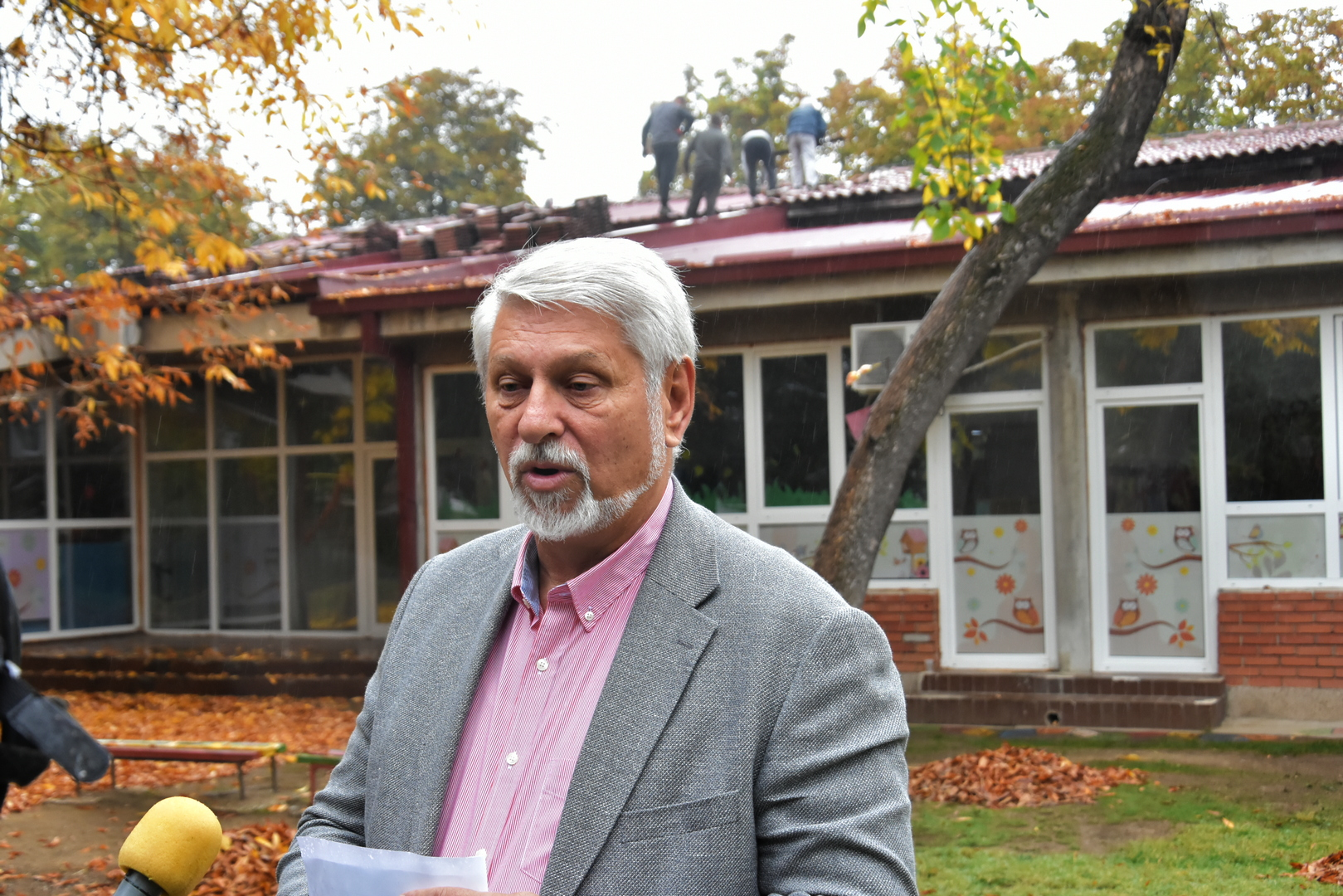

Stevčo Jakimovski (Macedonian: Стевчо Јакимовски, born 27 August 1960) from Podrži Konj, Kriva Palanka, is a Macedonian politician and leader of the Citizen Option for Macedonia, a political party he founded in 2013. He was a mayor of the Karpoš Municipality and a former member of the Social Democratic Union of Macedonia. In 2025, Jakimovski was put on under house and was charged with two separate crimes, and the Skopje Court combined the sentence into two. Jakimovski was given one year for unlawfully building the administrative building where the municipal authority now resides. The sentence in this case could have been between 3 and 8 years, but the court took into account the fact that Jakimovski was ordering the construction of a public building. In the second case, he was accused with abuse of office for legalizing unlawfully built buildings. The sentence can be put to appeal.
