= Constitution of North Macedonia =

Supreme law of the Republic of North Macedonia

The Constitution of the Republic of North Macedonia (Macedonian: Устав на Република Северна Македонија, Ustav na Republika Severna Makedonija; Albanian: Kushtetuta e Republikës së Maqedonisë së Veriut) is a codified constitution outlining North Macedonia's system of government and basic human rights. It was adopted in the Parliament of the then-Republic of Macedonia on 17 November 1991.

In 2001 it was announced that the country had adopted amendments to its Constitution which enshrined 15 basic amendments and has granted rights to the country's ethnic Albanian population, as part of the Ohrid Agreement.

In 2018, the government agreed to the Prespa agreement with Greece, where the constitutional name of the country would be changed from the "Republic of Macedonia" to the "Republic of North Macedonia" in exchange for assurances that Greece would no longer object to North Macedonia's integration in international organizations. Following ratification of the agreement and a non-binding referendum, Macedonia's Parliament approved a draft constitutional amendment on 3 December 2018. On 11 January 2019, the final version of the amendment was approved by parliament and was published the next day in the Official Gazette, giving force to the amendment.

== Policy details ==
The constitution stresses the importance of equality for all citizens. In Article 1, it is stated that "The Republic of North Macedonia is a sovereign, independent, democratic and social state. The sovereignty of the Republic of North Macedonia is indivisible, inalienable and nontransferable." Other examples of articles state things such as the fact that Skopje is the capital of the country, and that the Cyrillic alphabet is the official alphabet of Macedonian (according to Article 7). Other sections of the constitution concerns rights pertaining to the freedoms and rights of citizens, ideas concerning the organization of the government and judicial systems, the separate constitutional court of North Macedonia. There are also sections that detail the local government's rights, and international relations. In total, the constitution has 134 articles; it also has 32 amendments that have been put in place.

=== Constitutional Court ===
According to Article 109 of the Macedonian Constitution, the Constitutional Court is a body that protects the constitutionality and legality of the law. The establishment of such a specialized court since the country's independence in 1991, is in line with the continental model of protecting the constitutionality of legal acts. According to the Constitution, the Constitutional Court does not fall within the system of divisions of power, consequently, it is a special institution with a higher authority than the other institutions, with no right to appeal to its decisions, therefore perceived as "the corner of the constitutional democracy".

==== Organization of the Constitutional Court ====
Article 109 of the Constitution describes the organization and structure of the Constitutional Court:

"The Constitutional Court of the Republic of Macedonia is composed of nine judges. The Assembly elects the judges to the Constitutional Court by a majority vote of the total number of Representatives. The term of office of the judges is nine years without the right to reelection. The Constitutional Court elects a President from its own ranks for a term of three years without the right to reelection. Judges of the Constitutional Court are elected from the ranks of outstanding members of the legal profession."

— Article 109

==== Jurisdiction of the Constitutional Court ====
Article 110 of the Constitution outlines the responsibilities and powers of the Constitutional Court:

"The Constitutional Court of the Republic of Macedonia

- decides on the conformity of laws with the Constitution;

- decides on the conformity of collective agreements and other regulations with the Constitution and laws;

- protects the freedoms and rights of the individual and citizen relating to the freedom of conviction, conscience, thought and public expression of thought, political association and activity as well as to the prohibition of discrimination among citizens on the ground of sex, race, religion or national, social or political affiliation;

- decides on conflicts of competency among holders of legislative, executive and judicial offices;

- decides on conflicts of competency among Republic bodies and units of local self-government;

- decides on the answerability of the President of the Republic;

- decides on the constitutionality of the programmes and statutes of political parties and associations of citizens; and

- decides on other issues determined by the Constitution."

— Article 110

The Constitutional Court has proactive and broad powers through checks and balances on the entire legal system, and these powers could be differentiated into three distinct categories: a) a posteriori review, b) protection of the human rights of the citizens, and c) other powers.

===== Judicial review =====
Judicial review and conformity of the legislative acts are at the core of the competences conferred to the Constitutional Court by the Constitution. Therefore, this gives power to the Court to apply a posteriori review of conformity of national laws, but also international agreements as they need to enter the national legal system by ratification in the Parliament, as the Macedonian legal system is dualist. Any citizen can submit a procedure for judicial review (actio popularis), even if the citizen does not have a direct legal interest; additionally, the Court also has the power to initiate judicial review of a specific legislation. Article 15 of the Rules of Procedure of the Court outlines the content of the submission initiative before the Court.

===== Individual constitutional complaints regarding human rights =====
Additionally, the Constitutional Court is also conferred the power to secure the enjoyment of rights, outlined in Article 110(3) of the Constitution, after a constitutional complaint is submitted by an individual to the Court. The procedure for this constitutional complaint is elaborated in Article 50 of the Constitution:

Every citizen may invoke the protection of freedoms and rights determined by the Constitution before the regular courts, as well as before the Constitutional Court of Macedonia, through a procedure based upon the principles of priority and urgency. Judicial protection of the legality of individual acts of state administration, as well as of other institutions carrying out public mandates, is guaranteed. A citizen has the right to be informed on human rights and basic freedoms as well as actively to contribute, individually or jointly with others, to their promotion and protection.

— Article 50

This legal power could be traced back to the powers of the Yugoslav Federal Constitutional Court.

===== Other powers =====
In addition, the Constitutional Court decides when there is a "positive or negative conflicts of competency" among the different branches of government, as well as national bodies, and the bodies of the local government. Lastly, according to Article 83 of the Constitution, the Constitutional Court decides to withhold the immunity or approve detention for the President of the Republic.
