= 2018 in the Republic of Macedonia =

- Decades: 1990s; 2000s; 2010s; 2020s
- See also: Other events of 2018; History of North Macedonia • Years

The following lists events from the year 2018 in the Republic of Macedonia.

== Incumbents ==
- President: Gjorge Ivanov
- Prime Minister: Zoran Zaev

== Events ==
=== February ===
- February 7 - Prime Minister Zoran Zaev announces his country is ready to add a geographical qualifier in the country's name to end the dispute with Greece. Skopje International Airport and a key highway have also been renamed.

== Deaths ==
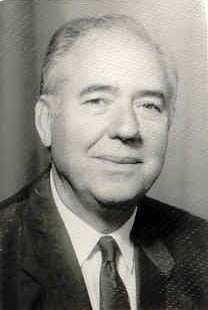
Ivan Katardžiev

- 1 December - Ivan Katardžiev, historian (b. 1926).
