= 2016 in the Republic of Macedonia =

- Decades: 1990s; 2000s; 2010s; 2020s
- See also: Other events of 2016; History of North Macedonia • Years

The following lists events from the year 2016 in the Republic of Macedonia.

== Incumbents ==
- President: Gjorge Ivanov
- Prime Minister: Nikola Gruevski (until 18 January); Emil Dimitriev

== Events ==
=== January ===
- 18 January – Emil Dimitriev took over as prime minister.

=== April ===
- 7 April - Opposition leader Zoran Zaev pledges to boycott the parliamentary elections due to a lack of government reform.
- 10 April - Macedonian police tear gas refugees near the border with Greece.
- 13 April - Several people are injured in clashes to police and thousands of protesters in Skopje as some storm President Gjorge Ivanov's office.
- 15 April - Protests intensify after lawmakers agree to call for snap elections on June 5. Opposition leader Zaev vowed to boycott the election.
- 17 April - Protests continue after Ivanov suspends an investigation into alleged corruption of a number of politicians.
- 18 April - Macedonia enters its second week of protests after Ivanov pardons politicians involved in wiretapping scandals.
- 20 April - As protests in Skopje grow, Zaev declares he will only take part in EU-brokered negotiations with the government if certain conditions are met namely the withdrawal of pardons President Ivanov gave to politicians involved in wiretapping.
- 21 April - After Zaev's decline to take part, the European Union cancels talks about the crisis in Macedonia. The EU is also considering sanctions against Macedonia for neglecting last year's agreement to investigate corruption and instead issuing amnesty to those involved.

=== August ===
- 10 August – The 2016 Macedonian floods killed at least 21 people.

== Deaths ==
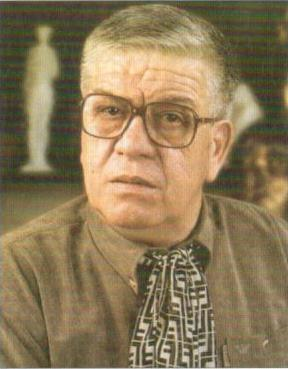
Tome Serafimovski

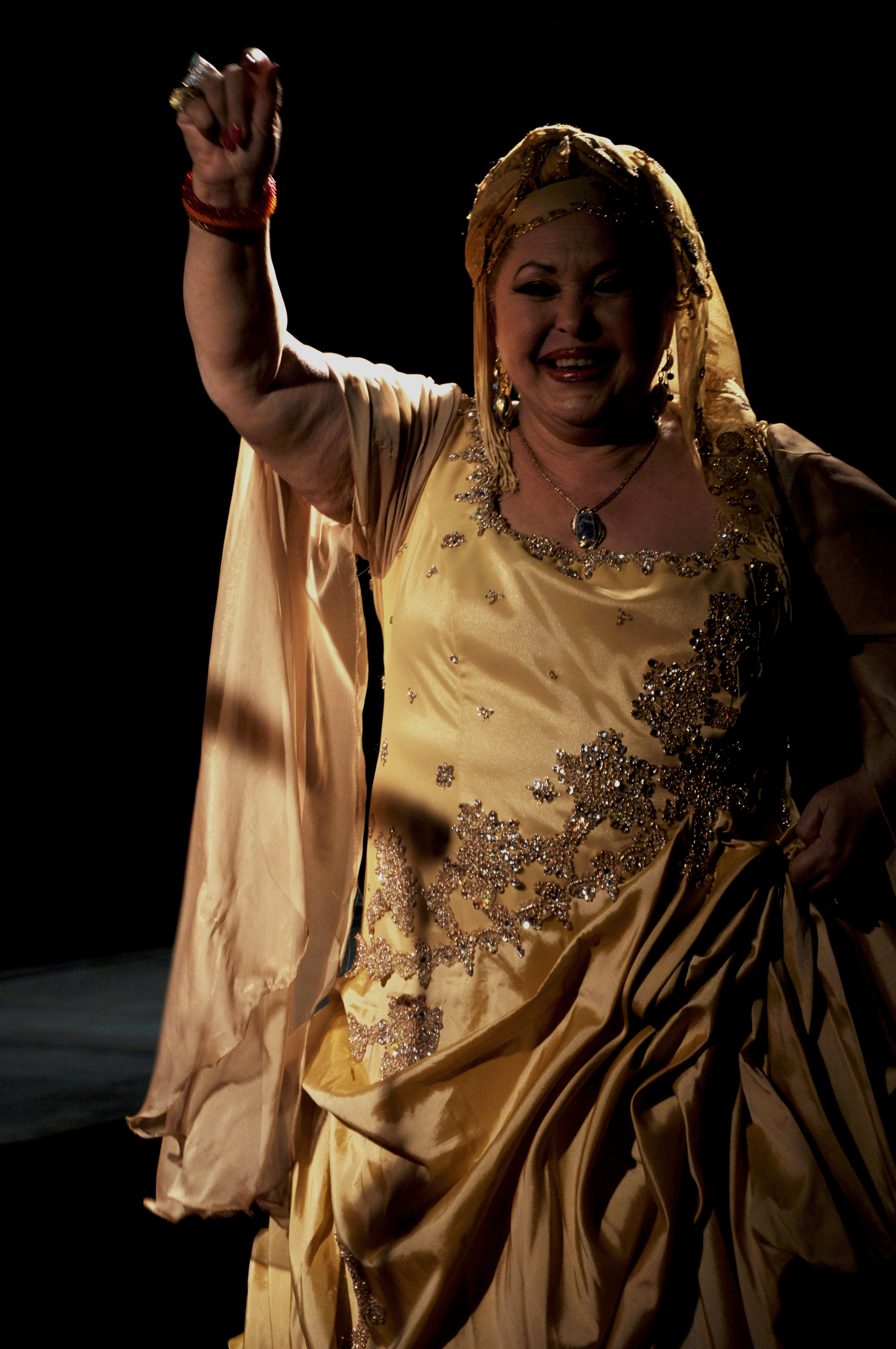
Singer Esma Redžepova was nicknamed Queen of the Gypsies

- 3 March – Tome Serafimovski, sculptor (b. 1935).
- 26 May – Esad Čolaković, footballer (b. 1970)
- 11 December – Esma Redžepova, Romani singer (b. 1943).
- 23 December – Meto Jovanovski, writer (b. 1928)
