= 2026 in North Macedonia =

- Decades: 2000s; 2010s; 2020s
- See also: Other events of 2026; History of North Macedonia • Years

Events in the year 2026 in the Republic of North Macedonia.

== Incumbents ==
- President: Gordana Siljanovska-Davkova
- Prime Minister: Hristijan Mickoski

== Events ==
- 26 January – A coordinated blockade is held by truck drivers in border crossings nationwide in protest over the implementation of the Entry/Exit System by the European Union.
- 6–22 February – North Macedonia at the 2026 Winter Olympics
- 17 November – The National Security Agency announces that it thwarted an assassination plot linked to the Iranian regime that targeted a person in neighboring Greece.

== Holidays ==
- 1 January – New Year's Day
- 7 January – Orthodox Christmas Day
- 20 March – Eid al-Fitr
- 13 April – Orthodox Easter Monday
- 1 May – Labour Day
- 24–25 May – Saints Cyril and Methodius' Day
- 2 August - Republic Day
- 8 September - Independence Day
- 11 October – Day of the Macedonian Uprising
- 23 October – Day of the Macedonian Revolutionary Struggle
- 8 December – Saint Clement of Ohrid Day

== Deaths ==
- 28 June – Vlado Janevski, 65, singer.
- 14 November – Agron Memedi, 46, footballer (Shkëndija, Metalurg Skopje, national team).
