= 2014 in the Republic of Macedonia =

- Decades: 1990s; 2000s; 2010s; 2020s
- See also: Other events of 2014; History of North Macedonia • Years

The following lists events that happened during 2014 in the Republic of Macedonia.

== Incumbents ==
- President: Gjorge Ivanov
- Prime Minister: Nikola Gruevski

== Events ==
=== April ===
- April 13 — Voters in Macedonia go to the polls for the first round of voting in a presidential election.
- April 27 —The second round of elections ended with the conservative Internal Macedonian Revolutionary Organization – Democratic Party for Macedonian National Unity (VMRO—DPMNE) winning. The conservative Gjorge Ivanov became the president, defeating Stevo Pendarovski of the Social Democratic Union of Macedonia (SDSM). Nikola Gruevski remained the prime minister, holding the post since 2006.
