= 2027 in North Macedonia =

- Decades: 2000s; 2010s; 2020s
- See also: Other events of 2027; History of North Macedonia • Years

Events in the year 2027 in the Republic of North Macedonia.

== Events ==
=== Predicted or scheduled ===
- 2026–27 Macedonian First Football League

== Holidays ==
- 1 January – New Year's Day
- 7 January – Orthodox Christmas Day
- 20 March – Eid al-Fitr
- 13 April – Orthodox Easter Monday
- 1 May – Labour Day
- 24–25 May – Saints Cyril and Methodius' Day
- 2 August - Republic Day
- 8 September - Independence Day
- 11 October – Day of the Macedonian Uprising
- 23 October – Day of the Macedonian Revolutionary Struggle
- 8 December – Saint Clement of Ohrid Day

== See also ==
- North Macedonia in the Eurovision Song Contest
