= 2015 in the Republic of Macedonia =

- Decades: 1990s; 2000s; 2010s; 2020s
- See also: Other events of 2015; History of North Macedonia • Years

The following lists events from the year 2015 in the Republic of Macedonia.

== Incumbents ==
- President: Gjorge Ivanov
- Prime Minister: Nikola Gruevski

== Events ==
- May 9-10 – a major armed confrontation in Kumanovo between Macedonian police and an ethnic Albanian armed group left 8 officers and 10-14 militants dead. The incident intensified the country's existing political instability.

== Deaths ==
- 22 March - Petar Hadži Boškov, sculptor
