= 2013 in the Republic of Macedonia =

- Decades: 1990s; 2000s; 2010s; 2020s
- See also: Other events of 2013; History of North Macedonia • Years

The following lists events that happened during 2013 in the Republic of Macedonia.

== Incumbents ==
- President: Gjorge Ivanov
- Prime Minister: Nikola Gruevski

== Events ==
=== May ===
- 15 May – SEEUTechPark opens on the South East European University campus in Tetovo.

=== June ===
- Darko Tofiloski, makes his football senior debut for Macedonia in a friendly match against Norway.

== Deaths ==
=== March ===
- 26 March - Nikola Mladenov, Journalist, actor, and newspaper founder (b. 1964)

== See also ==
- 2013–14 Macedonian First Football League
- Macedonia in the Eurovision Song Contest 2013
