= List of international presidential trips made by Ilir Meta =

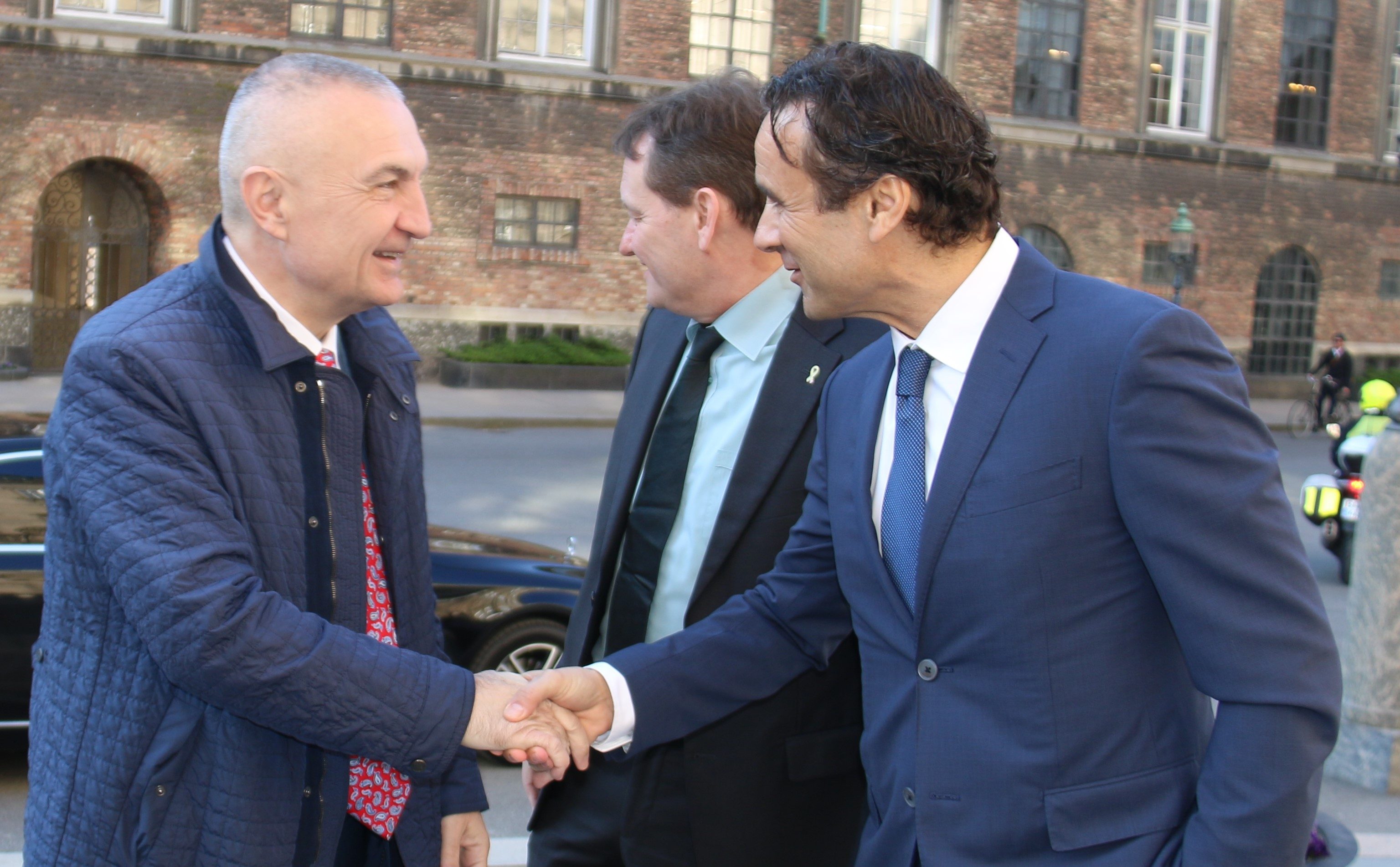
President Meta with OSCE Secretary General Roberto Montella in Copenhagen, 8 April 2019.

This is a list of official trips made by Ilir Meta as the 7th President of the Republic of Albania.

== 2017 ==
The following international trips were made by President Ilir Meta in 2017:

Country	Areas visited	Date	Details
Italy	Rome	11-12 September	President Meta travelled to Italy on his first state visit to the country as president, upon the invitation of President of Italy, Sergio Mattarella. He also met the President of the Italian Chamber of Deputies, Laura Boldrini and members of the Arbëresh community.
(North Macedonia) Macedonia	Skopje	20 November	President Meta travelled to Macedonia upon the invitation of President of Macedonia, Gjorge Ivanov.
France	Marseille	6-7 December	President Meta travelled to Marseille in France where he meat with regional leaders of the Provence-Alpes-Côte d'Azur upon the invitation of Renaud Muselier. He also had a meeting with Prince Albert of Monaco.

== 2018 ==
The following international trips were made by President Ilir Meta in 2018:

Country	Areas visited	Date	Details
Croatia	Zagreb	12 January	President Meta travelled to Croatia to meet with his counterpart Kolinda Grabar-Kitarović.
Malta	Valletta	26 March	President Meta travelled to Malta to meet with his counterpart Marie-Louise Coleiro Preca.
(North Macedonia) Macedonia	Skopje, Struga	27-29 April	President Meta travelled to Macedonia to attend the Brdo-Brijuni Process Summit. During his 3-day visit, he also visited members of the Albanian community living in Skopje and Struga.
Malta	Valletta	22 May	President Meta travelled to Malta to meet with his counterpart Marie-Louise Coleiro Preca and also to attend the Business Forum focused on Malta-Albania economical relations.
Kosovo	Prizren	10 June	President Meta traveled to Kosovo to attend celebrations regarding the 140th Anniversary of the national League of Prizren.
Germany	Berlin	15 June	President Meta traveled to Berlin to meet with he Chairman of the Bundestag Wolfgang Schäuble.
Hungary	Budapest	21 June	President Meta held a state visit in Hungary, where he met with the Prime Minister of Hungary Viktor Orbán and other state officials.
San Marino	San Marino	21 June	President Meta held a state visit in San Marino to meet state officials. During this visit, it was announced that San Marino would soon open an embassy in Tirana to further promote bilateral relations.
United States	New York City	28 September	United Nations General Assembly
France	Paris	10-13 November	Attended commemorations of the Armistice Day centenary and the 2018 Paris Peace Forum.

== 2019 ==
The following international trips were made by President Ilir Meta in 2019:

Country	Areas visited	Date	Details
Denmark	Copenhagen	8 April	President Meta travelled to meet with the Bureau of the OSCE Parliamentary Assembly.
North Macedonia	Skopje	12 May	President Meta traveled to Skopje due to the inauguration of Stevo Pendarovski as President of North Macedonia.
Germany	Berlin	7 June	President Meta travelled to attend the 24th International Berlin Gathering.
Bosnia and Herzegovina	Sarajevo	9 July	President Meta travelled to attend the SEECP Summit.

== See also ==
- Foreign relations of Albania
- Politics of Albania
