= 2022 in North Macedonia =

- Decades: 2000s; 2010s; 2020s
- See also: Other events of 2022; History of North Macedonia • Years

Events in the year 2022 in North Macedonia.

== Incumbents ==
- President: Stevo Pendarovski
- Prime Minister: Zoran Zaev (until 16 January), Dimitar Kovačevski (starting 16 January)

== Events ==
Ongoing — COVID-19 pandemic in North Macedonia

- 24 June - Bulgaria lifts its veto against North Macedonia's bid to join the European Union.
- 2 July - Protests erupt in the capital Skopje over the French proposal to unblock EU accession talks with North Macedonia.
- 16 July - The Assembly of North Macedonia passes a motion to amend North Macedonia's Constitution to recognise its Bulgarian minority, while pledging to discuss remaining issues with the Bulgarian government. In exchange, Bulgaria will allow membership talks with the European Union to begin.
- 19 July - Negotiations on the accession of North Macedonia and Albania to the European Union begin in Brussels.

== Deaths ==
- 17 April – Omer Kaleshi, painter (b. 1932)
- 1 August - Ilinka Mitreva, politician (b. 1950)
- 10 August - Kiril Dojčinovski, footballer (b. 1943)
