= First ladies and gentlemen of North Macedonia =

Formal title of the partner of president of North Macedonia

First Gentleman of North Macedonia
- Прв господин на Северна Македонија; Zotëria i parë i Maqedonisë së Veriut
- Incumbent; Blagoja Davkov since May 12, 2024
- Inaugural holder: Nada Gligorova
- Formation: January 27, 1991

First Lady of North Macedonia (Macedonian: Прва Дама на Северна Македонија; Albanian: Zonja e Parë e Maqedonisë së Veriut) or First Gentleman of North Macedonia (Macedonian: Прв господин на Северна Македонија; Albanian: Zotëria i parë i Maqedonisë së Veriut) is the title attributed to the wife or husband of the president of North Macedonia. The current first gentleman of North Macedonia is Blagoja Davkov, husband of 6th president Gordana Siljanovska-Davkova.

== First ladies and gentlemen of North Macedonia ==
Name	Portrait	Term Began	Term Ended	President of North Macedonia	Notes
Nada Gligorova		January 27, 1991	November 19, 1999	Kiro Gligorov	
Vilma Trajkovska		December 15, 1999	February 26, 2004	Boris Trajkovski	
Jasna Crvenkovska		May 12, 2004	May 12, 2009	Branko Crvenkovski	
Maja Ivanova		May 12, 2009	May 12, 2019	Gjorge Ivanov	
Elizabeta Gjorgievska		May 12, 2019	May 12, 2024	Stevo Pendarovski	
Blagoja Davkov		May 12, 2024	Present	Gordana Siljanovska-Davkova	
