= 2025 in North Macedonia =

- Decades: 2000s; 2010s; 2020s
- See also: Other events of 2025; History of North Macedonia • Years

Events in the year 2025 in the Republic of North Macedonia.

== Incumbents ==
- President: Gordana Siljanovska-Davkova
- Prime Minister: Hristijan Mickoski

== Events ==
- 23 January – A court in Skopje orders the release of four VMRO-DPMNE officials, namely former Assembly of North Macedonia speaker Trajko Veljanovski, former ministers Spiro Ristovski and Mile Janakieski and former Administration for Security and Counterintelligence chief Vladimir Atanasovski, who were convicted in 2021 and imprisoned for their role in organizing the 2017 storming of the Macedonian Parliament.
- 16 March – A fire at a nightclub in Kočani kills 62 people and injures 196 others.
- 20–26 July – 2025 European Youth Summer Olympic Festival
- 19 October – 2025 North Macedonian local elections (first round)
- 2 November – 2025 North Macedonian local elections (second round): The VMRO-DPMNE wins mayoral elections in 55 of the country's 81 municipalities, including in Skopje.

== Holidays ==
- 1 January – New Year's Day
- 7 January – Orthodox Christmas Day
- 30 March – Eid al-Fitr
- 21 April – Orthodox Easter Monday
- 1 May – Labour Day
- 24 May – Saints Cyril and Methodius' Day
- 2 August - Republic Day
- 8 September - Independence Day
- 11 October – Day of the Macedonian Uprising
- 23 October – Day of the Macedonian Revolutionary Struggle
- 8 December – Saint Clement of Ohrid Day

== Deaths ==
- 13 August – Milka Eftimova, 89, operatic singer
- 23 December – Vasil Ringov, 70, footballer (Vardar, Partizan, Dinamo Zagreb)
