= 2021 in North Macedonia =

- Decades: 2000s; 2010s; 2020s
- See also: Other events of 2021; History of North Macedonia • Years

Events in the year 2021 in North Macedonia.

== Incumbents ==
- President: Stevo Pendarovski
- Prime Minister: Zoran Zaev

== Events ==
Ongoing — COVID-19 pandemic in North Macedonia

- 8 September - At least 15 patients are killed following a fire at a hospital in Tetovo.
- 17 and 31 October - Local elections
- 12 December - An election held to elect new prime minister
- 2021 North Macedonia census

== Deaths ==
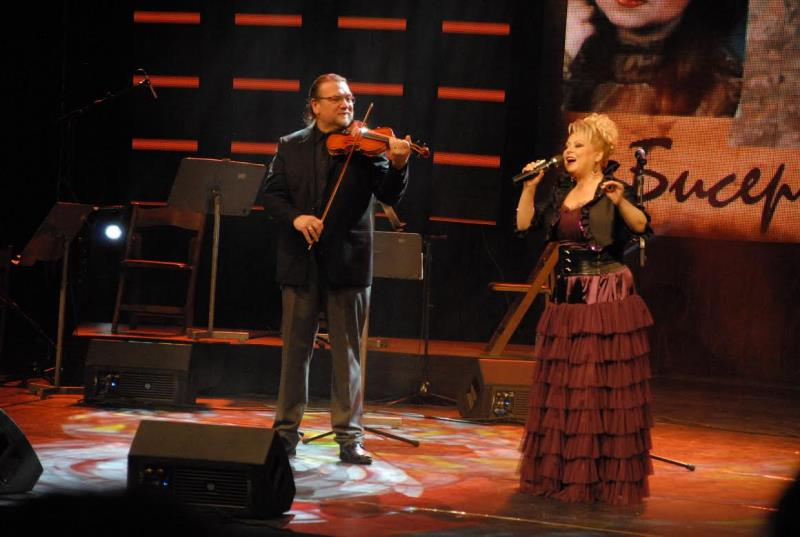
Zoran Džorlev (left)

- 1 January – Zoran Džorlev, violinist (b. 1967).
