= 2019 in North Macedonia =

- Decades: 1990s; 2000s; 2010s; 2020s
- See also: Other events of 2019; History of North Macedonia • Years

This is a list of events from the year 2019 in North Macedonia.

== Incumbents ==
- President: Gjorge Ivanov (until 12 May); Stevo Pendarovski (from 12 May)
- Prime Minister: Zoran Zaev

== Events ==
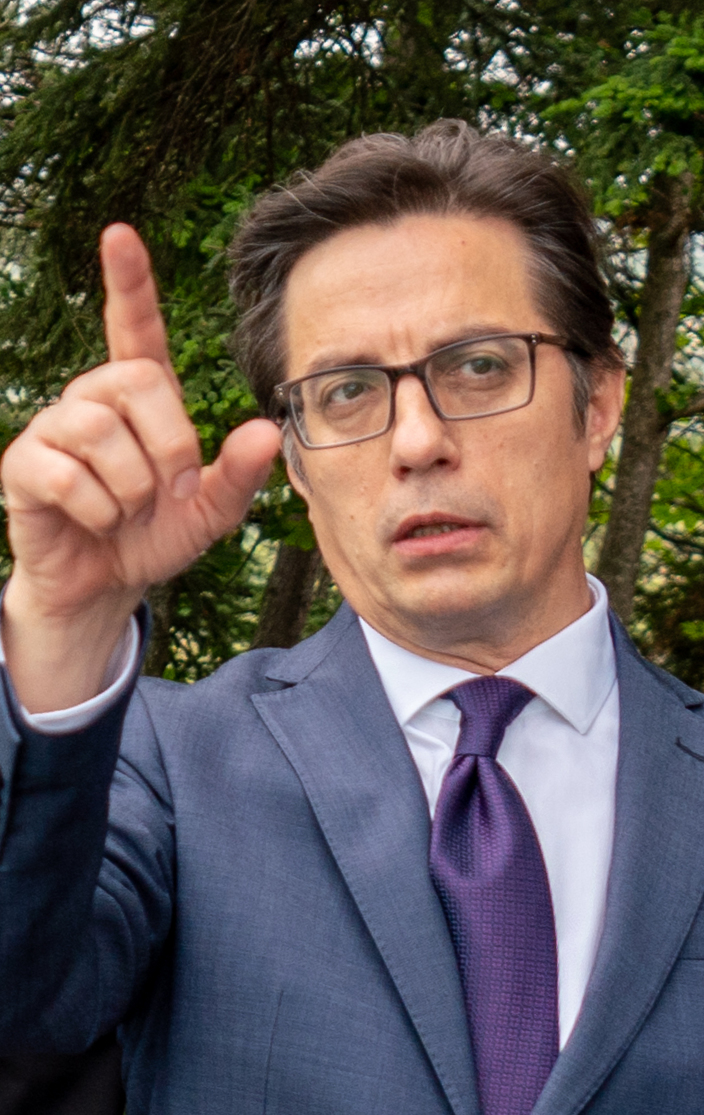
Stevo Pendarovski, the new president from 12 May

- 12 February – The official name of the country is changed to "Republic of North Macedonia", or North Macedonia for short (formerly the Republic of Macedonia and commonly known as Macedonia).
- 21 April – Presidential Election.
- 12 May – President Stevo Pendarovski is inaugurated.

=== Sport ===
- The 2018–19 Macedonian Football Cup continues from 2018.

== Deaths ==
- 9 January – Milan Pančevski, politician, Chairman of the Presidium of the League of Communists of Yugoslavia (b. 1935).
