= 2024 in North Macedonia =

- Decades: 2000s; 2010s; 2020s
- See also: Other events of 2024; History of North Macedonia • Years

Events in the year 2024 in the Republic of North Macedonia.

== Incumbents ==
- President: Stevo Pendarovski (Until May 12); Gordana Siljanovska-Davkova onwards
- Prime Minister: Dimitar Kovačevski (until 29 January); Talat Xhaferi (29 January–23 June), Hristijan Mickoski (since 23 June)

== Events ==
=== January ===
- 24–28 January – European Under-21 Table Tennis Championships

=== April ===
- 15 April – Seventeen police officers stationed at Idrizovo prison are arrested on suspicion of facilitating the escape of two inmates, including a convicted murderer, in 2023.
- 24 April – 2024 North Macedonian presidential election (first round): Both incumbent president Stevo Pendarovski and Gordana Siljanovska-Davkova advance to a runoff.

=== May ===
- 8 May:
  - 2024 North Macedonian presidential election (second round). Gordana Siljanovska-Davkova defeats the incumbent Stevo Pendarovski to become the first woman to be elected as President of North Macedonia.
  - 2024 North Macedonian parliamentary election: The VMRO-DPMNE and its Your Macedonia coalition win 58 seats in the Assembly of North Macedonia, just three shy of an outright majority.
- 12 May – Gordana Siljanovska-Davkova is sworn in as the first female President of North Macedonia.

=== June ===
- 19–30 June – 2024 Women's Junior World Handball Championship
- 23 June –
  - The Assembly of North Macedonia votes 77-22 to approve a mandate for prime minister-designate Hristijan Mickoski of the VMRO-DPMNE and his coalition government.
  - North Macedonia's Ministry of Foreign Affairs urges all its citizens in Lebanon to leave as soon as possible due to "deteriorating security" in the region from escalating conflicts.

=== July ===
- 28 July – One person is killed in a wildfire in Kokosinje.

=== September ===
- 19 October – A case of bird flu of the H5N1 variant is detected in a deceased goose at the Skopje Zoo, prompting its closure for three weeks and the culling of several birds.

=== November ===
- 29 November – A man returning from Russia is arrested in Skopje Airport on suspicion of plotting to join the Russian military and fight in Ukraine.

=== December ===
- 6–11 December – European Blitz and Rapid Chess Championships at Skopje
- 15 December – Four people are arrested on terrorism charges in Struga and Gostivar.

== Holidays ==
- 1 January – New Year's Day
- 7 January – Orthodox Christmas Day
- 10 April – Eid al-Fitr
- 1 May – Labour Day
- 6 May – Orthodox Easter Monday
- 24 May – Saints Cyril and Methodius' Day
- 2 August - Republic Day
- 8 September - Independence Day
- 11 October – Day of the Macedonian Uprising
- 23 October – Day of the Macedonian Revolutionary Struggle
- 8 December – Saint Clement of Ohrid Day
