= 2020 in North Macedonia =

- Decades: 2000s; 2010s; 2020s
- See also: Other events of 2020; History of North Macedonia • Years

This is a list of events from the year 2020 in North Macedonia.

== Incumbents ==
- President: Stevo Pendarovski
- Prime Minister: Zoran Zaev

== Events ==
- 26 February – First confirmed case of COVID-19.
- 22 March – First death due to COVID-19.
- 27 March – North Macedonia becomes a full member of NATO.
- 15 July – 2020 North Macedonian parliamentary election.
