= 2023 in North Macedonia =

- Decades: 2000s; 2010s; 2020s
- See also: Other events of 2023; History of North Macedonia • Years

Events in the year 2023 in North Macedonia.

== Incumbents ==
- President: Stevo Pendarovski
- Prime Minister: Dimitar Kovačevski

== Events ==
Ongoing — COVID-19 pandemic in North Macedonia

- 14 January – Authorities arrested four police officers, including a police commander, under suspicion for helping a prisoner convicted of murder to escape. The prisoner was being transferred to a hospital.
- 20 January – North Macedonia and Bulgaria denounce a hate crime committed against Hristian Pendikov, secretary of the Bulgarian cultural club Tsar Boris III, in Ohrid.
- 5 June – 10 men are arrested as suspected members of an international people smuggling ring following a two-year investigation. Police describe the group as a sophisticated criminal organization that operated routes between Greece and Hungary as well as from Bulgaria and Serbia to various destinations in the European Union.
- 4 September – Thousands of protestors gather in Skopje over allegations that patients at a state cancer hospital missed life-saving treatment because staff were stealing the drugs to sell on the black market.
- 8 September – Greece and North Macedonia, alongside the European Centre for Byzantine Monuments, sign a deal to save Byzantine frescoes from the 12th century. The fresco paintings were found inside St George's church in North Macedonia and are an example of Byzantine art in the Balkan region.
- 12 September – North Macedonia orders the expulsion of three Russian diplomats for alleged violations of the Vienna Convention on Diplomatic Relations.
- 15 December – Albania returns 20 icons to North Macedonia that were trafficked a decade ago, according to Albania's Culture Ministry. A handover ceremony is held at the National History Museum in the Albanian capital, Tirana.
