= Elizabeta Gjorgievska =

First Lady of North Macedonia from 2019 to 2024

- Елизабета Ѓоргиевска
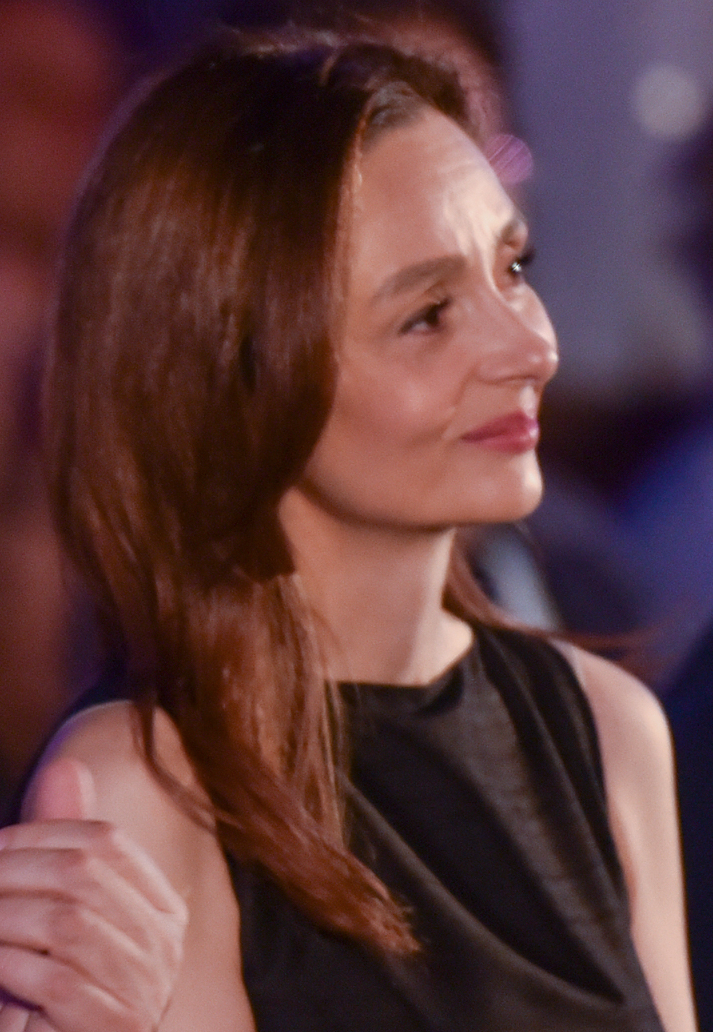

First Lady of North Macedonia
- In office 12 May 2019 – 12 May 2024
- Preceded by: Maja Ivanova
- Succeeded by: Blagoja Davkov (as First Gentleman)

Personal details
- Born: 6 May 1972 (age 54) Skopje, SR Macedonia, Yugoslavia
- Spouse: Stevo Pendarovski
- Children: 1
- Education: Ss. Cyril and Methodius University of Skopje

Elizabeta Gjorgievska (Macedonian: Елизабета Ѓоргиевска; born 6 May 1972) is a Macedonian physician who is the wife of the fifth President Stevo Pendarovski and the former First Lady of North Macedonia.

== Biography ==
Gjorgievska was born on 6 May 1972 in Skopje. In March 1996, she graduated from the Faculty of Dentistry at the University of Skopje (now the Ss. Cyril and Methodius University of Skopje). Since 1998, she studied at the magistracy at the same faculty and in 2002, she defended her Ph.D. thesis, and in 2006, a doctoral dissertation.

From 1997 to 1998, Gjorgievska worked as a volunteer at the Clinic of Maxillofacial Surgery, and in 1998, she became as a doctor at the Clinic of Pediatric and Preventive Dentistry. In 2002, she passed the exam in the specialty. In 2004, Gjorgievska became a junior assistant, and in 2006, an assistant at the Department of Pediatric Preventive Dentistry at the University of Skopje. In 2008, she became an associate professor.

In 2002, Gjorgievska obtained a master's degree and became a specialist in pediatric and preventive dentistry, and since 2006 she has been a doctor of science. She made several research visits to universities in the United Kingdom, Belgium and the United States, and worked on several international research projects.

Gjorgievska has published over 90 papers. She was a member of the organizing and scientific committees of several national and international symposiums and conferences. She has delivered lectures and seminars at scientific conferences in North Macedonia and abroad. She is the author of many works, including two monographs and co-author of three more monographs. From 2010 to 2014, she was the chairman of the Macedonian Association of Pediatric and Preventive Dentistry. She is a member of various international organizations related to dentistry and a visiting professor at Columbia University in New York.

== Personal life ==
Gjorgievska and Pendarovski have one child. She supported her husband in the country's presidential elections in 2014 and 2019. Pendarovski in an interview said that he married Gjorgievska because she is "a first league housewife, who is also hardworking and has a Ph.D."
