= List of years in North Macedonia =

This is a list of years in North Macedonia.

== 20th century ==
1920s
1929

1930s
1930
1931
1932
1933
1934
1935
1936
1937
1938
1939

- 1940s: 1940
- 1941
- 1942
- 1943
- 1944
- 1945
- 1946
- 1947
- 1948
- 1949

1950s
1950
1951
1952
1953
1954
1955
1956
1957
1958
1959

- 1960s: 1960
- 1961
- 1962
- 1963
- 1964
- 1965
- 1966
- 1967
- 1968
- 1969

1970s
1970
1971
1972
1973
1974
1975
1976
1977
1978
1979

1980s
1980
1981
1982
1983
1984
1985
1986
1987
1988
1989

- 1990s: 1990
- 1991
- 1992
- 1993
- 1994
- 1995
- 1996
- 1997
- 1998
- 1999

== 21st century ==
2000s
2000
2001
2002
2003
2004
2005
2006
2007
2008
2009

- 2010s: 2010
- 2011
- 2012
- 2013
- 2014
- 2015
- 2016
- 2017
- 2018
- 2019

2020s
2020
2021
2022
2023
2024
2025
2026
2027
2028
2029
