= Kičevo Clashes =

1943 partisan operations and clashes in Kičevo during World War II

1943 Partisan Operations in Kičevo
- Part of World War II in Yugoslav Macedonia and the German occupation of Albania
Date	9 September – November 1943
Location	Kičevo, Kingdom of Yugoslavia (under Italian then German occupation) 41°30′44″N 20°57′31″E
Result	Temporary partisan success, followed by Axis reoccupation: * Italian garrison disarmed (9 Sep); Town briefly under partisan control; German–Balli Kombëtar forces reoccupy by October; Partisan guerrilla actions continue into 1944

Belligerents
Yugoslav Partisans; People's Liberation Army of Macedonia (NOVM); Albanian communist partisans	Wehrmacht; (Albania) Balli Kombëtar

Commanders and leaders
(Yugoslav Partisans) Mihajlo Apostolski; (Yugoslav Partisans) Metodija Andonov; (Yugoslav Partisans) Fadil Hoxha; Hysni Kapo	Unknown German garrison commander; (Albania) Xhemë Gostivari; (Albania) Mefail Shehu

Strength
(Yugoslav Partisans) 800–1,200 partisans (Sep–Nov)	(Albania) 600–900 German and Ballist troops

Casualties and losses
3 killed, 7 wounded (9 Sep); ~60–80 killed or wounded (Nov clashes)	12 killed, 18 wounded (German + Balli, Nov)
- Location of Kičevo in modern North Macedonia

The 1943 Partisan Operations in Kičevo (Macedonian: Партизански операции во Кичево 1943, Albanian: Operacionet partizane në Kërçovë 1943), were a series of resistance actions in and around Kičevo, western North Macedonia, during the Balkan campaign of World War II. The operations comprised two distinct phases: the bloodless disarmament of the Italian garrison on 9 September 1943, following Italy’s armistice with the Allies, and subsequent guerrilla clashes in November between Yugoslav Partisans and German occupation forces supported by Balli Kombëtar militias.

The 9 September action marked Kičevo as the first town in Macedonia to be liberated by partisans during the war, although control proved short-lived.

== Background ==
Following the Axis invasion of Yugoslavia in April 1941, Kičevo was annexed to the Italian protectorate of Albania (1939–1943), becoming part of the Italian-administered "Greater Albania". The mountainous region, with its mixed Macedonian and Albanian population, emerged as a centre of resistance. Communist partisans organised under the People's Liberation Army of Macedonia (NOVM) and the Albanian National Liberation Army.

The Armistice of Cassibile, signed on 8 September 1943, precipitated the collapse of Italian military authority across the Balkans, creating a power vacuum that partisan forces moved swiftly to exploit.

== Course of events ==
=== Disarmament of the Italian garrison (9 September 1943) ===
On the night of 8–9 September, a joint force of Macedonian partisans led by Mirče Acev and Albanian communists under Fadil Hoxha and Hysni Kapo entered Kičevo. Through negotiation, they persuaded the commander of the Italian Ferrara Division to surrender without resistance. The partisans seized:

- 1,200 rifles
- 12 machine guns
- Several artillery pieces
- Substantial ammunition and supply stocks

Only three partisans were killed in minor skirmishes with disoriented Italian sentries.

=== German and Balli Kombëtar reoccupation ===
By late September, Nazi Germany dispatched reinforcements to reassert control over western Macedonia. Facing troop shortages, the Germans armed and deputised Balli Kombëtar units as auxiliary police in Albanian-inhabited districts. Xhemë Gostivari (Hasa), a senior Balli commander, was appointed to oversee security in Kičevo.

Balli Kombëtar, ideologically anti-communist and opposed to Yugoslav territorial ambitions, cooperated with the Germans to suppress partisan activity and secure supply routes to Thessaloniki.

=== November guerrilla actions ===
In early November, the newly formed **"Mirče Acev" Battalion** and supporting Albanian partisan detachments launched a series of ambushes on German convoys and Balli outposts. The partisans inflicted approximately 30 casualties on Axis forces but suffered heavier losses (~60–80 killed or wounded) due to German artillery and air support.

== Aftermath ==
German and Balli control of Kičevo endured until **15 November 1944**, when the town was permanently liberated during the Kosovo Operation (1944).

The events exacerbated the rift between communist partisans and Albanian nationalist factions.

== See also ==
- World War II in Yugoslav Macedonia
- Albanian resistance during World War II
- Balli Kombëtar

== Bibliography ==
- Apostolski, Mihailo (1973). Ослоободителната војна на Македонија 1941–1944 [The Liberation War of Macedonia 1941–1944] (in Macedonian). Skopje: Институт за национална историја. OCLC 6327095.
- Barker, Elisabeth (1950). Macedonia: Its Place in Balkan Power Politics. Macmillan. ISBN 978-0333440506.
- Fischer, Bernd Jürgen (2007). Albania at War, 1939–1945. Purdue University Press. ISBN 978-1-55753-141-4.
- Pearson, Owen (2006). Albania in Occupation and War: From Fascism to Communism 1940–1945. I.B. Tauris. ISBN 978-1-84511-104-5.
