= Tome Serafimovski =

Macedonian sculptor (1935–2016)

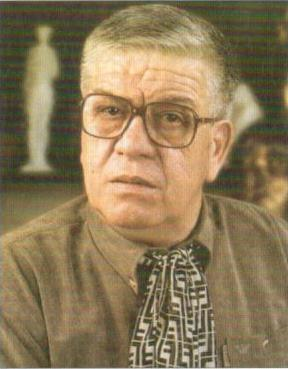
- Born: July 14, 1935; Zubovce, Macedonia
- Died: March 3, 2016 (aged 80); Skopje, Macedonia
- Education: Arts Academy University of Split; Academy of Fine Arts, Zagreb
- Known for: Sculptor
- Notable work: Cyril and Methodius; Kiril Pejčinović-Tetoec; Iljo Antevski-Smok; Mother Teresa; Vera Jocić

Tome Serafimovski (July 14, 1935 – March 3, 2016) was a Macedonian sculptor, author of more than 500 sculptures of durable materials – wood, bronze and marble – 100 miniatures, as well as 40-odd notable monuments across the country and around the world. He became a member of the Macedonian Academy of Sciences and Arts in 1988. During 50-year career he held several solo exhibitions in Macedonia and abroad, and won a number of awards and accolades.

== Biography ==
=== Early life ===
Serafimovski was born on July 14, 1935, in Zubovce, Macedonia. He graduated from school in Gostivar and by 1957 graduated from the Arts Academy University in Split, Croatia with a degree in sculpting received under the guidance of professors Marin Studin and Ivan Mirković. In the same place, he also worked as a scenographer in the National Theatre. The same year he further extended his education in the Academy of Fine Arts in Zagreb and graduated from there in 1963. Three years later, the French government awarded him with a scholarship and invited him to stay in Paris. By the end of 1969 he came back to Macedonia and continued to work there as a scenographer at the Radio-Television in Skopje.

=== Career ===
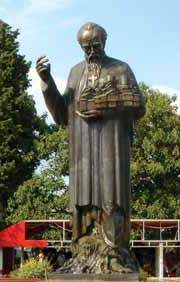
Serafimovski's sculpture of Saint Clement of Ohrid in Ohrid

From 1970 to 1987 Serafimovski lived and worked in both Gostivar and Ohrid during which time he also created many monuments both in Macedonia and throughout Yugoslavia. He was a member of the Society of Fine Artists of Macedonia in 1962 and was its president between 1977 and 1978. There he created more than 400 drawings, figures, portraits and sketches, and also made sculptures out of bronze, marble and wood. Throughout the former Yugoslavia it is possible to find his art work, especially his 13 monuments. His most notable works are a cow of the Karlovac Milk Industry in the city of Karlovac and a monument on a bridge which goes over the Korana river. He also erected a monument of Vera Jocić, a Macedonian hero, in Makedonska Kamenica and monuments to Kiril Pejčinović-Tetoec and Iljo Antevski-Smok in Tetovo. His religious work was also appreciated; during his life he created a sculpture of Mother Teresa in both Skolje and Nuremberg and a monument dedicated to the Holy Brothers Cyril and Methodius in Ohrid. Throughout 45 years he had exhibitions in both Macedonia and abroad, ranging from Gostivar, Karlovac, Mostar, Ohrid, and Split to Belgrade, Las Palmas, New York City, Paris, and Nuremberg. His collections can be found in such museums as French Writers Association and various Vatican Museums. Since 1992 he was a member of the Publishing Board in Sofia and from that year to 1999 held the same position at the Macedonian Academy of Sciences and Arts, where he was elected on October 7, 1988.
