= 2017 in the Republic of Macedonia =

- Decades: 1990s; 2000s; 2010s; 2020s
- See also: Other events of 2017; History of North Macedonia • Years

Events from the year 2017 in the Republic of Macedonia.

== Incumbents ==
- President: Gjorge Ivanov
- Prime Minister: Emil Dimitriev (until May 31), Zoran Zaev (starting May 31)

== Events ==
- March
  - 24 March – scheduled date for the Macedonian local elections, 2017
- April
  - 27 April – Dozens of Macedonian nationalists storm the Macedonian parliament after the election of Talat Xhaferi as Speaker of the Assembly.

=== Sport ===
- Continuing from 2016: The 2016–17 Macedonian Football Cup

== Deaths ==
- 7 March – Slavko Brezoski, architect (b. 1922).
- 9 May – Zoran Madžirov, percussionist (b. 1968)
