= Zoran Džorlev =

Macedonian violinist (1967–2021)

Zoran Džorlev Зоран Џорлев
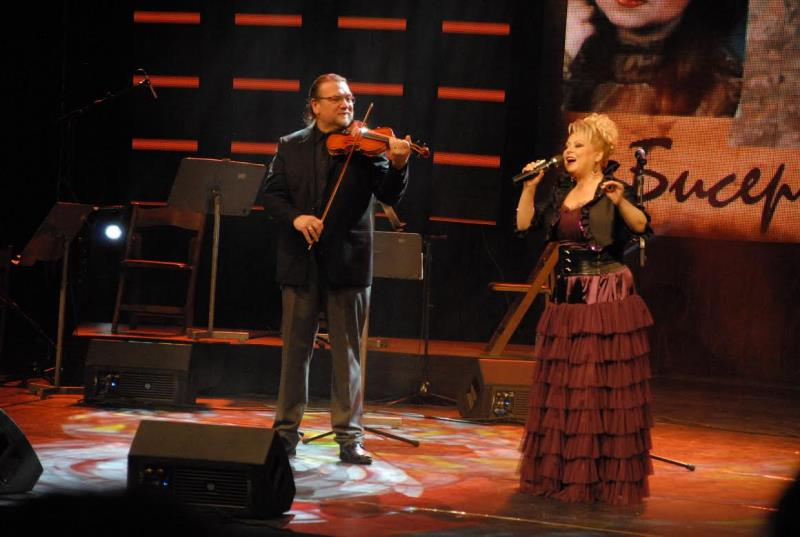
- Džorlev (left) in 2016

Background information
- Born: 10 January 1967; Strumica, SR Macedonia, Yugoslavia
- Died: 1 January 2021 (aged 53); Skopje, North Macedonia
- Genres: Classical
- Occupation: Violinist
- Instrument: Violin

Zoran Džorlev (Note: Macedonian: Зоран Џорлев, romanized: Zoran Džorlev) (10 January 1967 – 1 January 2021) was a Macedonian violinist.

== Life ==
His father, Nasko, was a famous composer of folk music and conductor of an orchestra, and his grandfather Hristo, a friend of national hero Goce Delchev, was a member of a band of kumiti rebels that fought against the Ottoman Empire during the Macedonian Struggle. He began playing several other instruments prior to learning the violin. Džorlev was known for his renditions of narodni pesni or folk songs. He served for 14 years as the orchestra director for the Macedonian Opera and Ballet, including 3 years as the Vice Concert Maestro. This was eventually followed by a significant role as the Director of the national folk dance ensemble called Tanec that spanned six and a half years. While serving in these positions, he also was a member of various musical organizations in his homeland while also teaching as a professor at several universities as well as having highlighted academic seminars.

Džorlev died from complications related to COVID-19 at Skopje's Infectious Diseases Clinic. He was 53 years old.

== Discography ==
- Ne kažuvaj libe (2008)
- Maestro Zoran Džorlev i Suzana Spasovska – violina i glas (2014)
- The Voice Of The Violin. Traditional Macedonian Song (2014)
- Dzorlev & Bedzo - Evergreen World Music (2014)
