= 1991 Macedonian independence referendum =

- 8 September 1991
- Are you for a sovereign and independent state of Macedonia, with a right to enter into any future alliance with the sovereign states of Yugoslavia?

Results
Choice	Votes	%
Yes	1,079,308	96.46%
No	39,639	3.54%
Valid votes	1,118,947	98.79%
Invalid or blank votes	13,648	1.21%
Total votes	1,132,595	100.00%
Registered voters/turnout	1,495,807	75.72%

An independence referendum was held in Macedonia (now North Macedonia) on 8 September 1991, which resulted in the country proclaiming independence from Yugoslavia. The referendum question read: "Are you for a sovereign and independent state of Macedonia, with a right to enter into any future alliance with the sovereign states of Yugoslavia?" It was approved by 96% of voters, with a turnout of 76%; most ethnic Albanians in the country boycotted the referendum over the latter half of the referendum question. 8 September is celebrated as Independence Day in North Macedonia.

== Background ==
Amid the fall of communism in Europe in 1989, the socialist government of Macedonia introduced reforms parallel to the Glasnost reforms of the Soviet Union. Political pluralism was legalised, and multi-party elections were held in November 1990. On 25 January 1991, the Assembly of the Socialist Republic of Macedonia adopted the "Declaration of Sovereignty". On 7 June, the Assembly of SR Macedonia officially dropped "Socialist" from the country's name. After Slovenia and Croatia declared their independence in June 1991, starting the breakup of Yugoslavia, the Macedonian parliament passed a motion in August to hold an independence referendum on 8 September.

== Question and results ==
The question on the referendum was: "Are you for a sovereign and independent state of Macedonia, with a right to enter into any future alliance with the sovereign states of Yugoslavia?" The latter part of the question was intended to reserve an independent Macedonia the right to join a revived version of Yugoslavia in the event of Yugoslavia's total collapse. Many ethnic Albanians in the country, although in favour of Macedonian independence, boycotted the referendum because they opposed the latter part of the question, as they were wary of Serbian political dominance in a future Yugoslavia of any form. Nonetheless, turnout was over 76%, with 96% of voters in favour of independence and the right to join a new Yugoslavia. Despite the Albanians' boycott, a multiethnic government was formed after Macedonia's declaration of independence later that year.

The anniversary of the referendum, on 8 September, is celebrated as the Independence Day of North Macedonia (formerly just Macedonia).

Choice	Votes	%
For	1,079,308	96.46
Against	39,639	3.54
Total	1,118,947	100.00
Valid votes	1,118,947	98.79
Invalid/blank votes	13,648	1.21
Total votes	1,132,595	100.00
Registered voters/turnout	1,495,807	75.72
Source: Nohlen & Stöver 2010, p. 1278
