= SEEUTechPark =

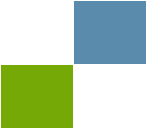
- Trade name: SEEUTechPark
- Company type: Organization
- Founded: Tetovo, North Macedonia (2013)
- Headquarters: Tetovo, North Macedonia
- Area served: North Macedonia
- Key people: Azir Aliu, Edmond Etemi
- Owner: South East European University
- Website: http://techpark.seeu.edu.mk

SEEUTechPark is a technology park located on South East European University campus in Tetovo, North Macedonia. Opened on May 15, 2013 by the Board of South East European University in order to create conditions to stimulate the creation of new start-up companies, creating a synergy between the companies and encourage the growth of existing SMEs (small and medium enterprises) which in the long term provides new job opportunities.

== History ==
SEEUTechPark launched on February 1, 2013.

== Departments ==
=== Tenants ===
SEEUTechPark

=== Incubator ===
SEEUTechPark

=== Training and Events ===
SEEUTechPark

=== Microsoft IT Academy ===
Trainings not only on fundamentals technology but also technical courses for students and others that are interested to be successful during their studies and at beginning of their career.

=== Wednesday TALK! ===
Panel discussion organized by the SEEUTechPark which comes with a meeting in a month - “On Wednesday“

Wednesday TALK! is designed to provide an opportunity for students and everyone who wants to hear several people knowledgeable about specific issue or topic, present information and discuss personal views. Wednesday TALK! may help the audience further clarify and evaluate their positions regarding specific issues or topics being discussed and increase their understanding of the positions of others.
