= Zoran Madžirov =

Macedonian musician (1968–2017)

Zoran Madzirov
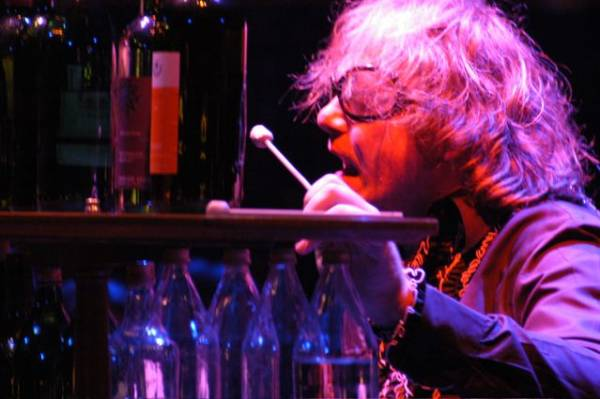
- Zoran Madzirov playing the bottles

Background information
- Born: Zoran Madzirov; 14 January 1968; Strumica, SFR Yugoslavia
- Died: 9 May 2017 (aged 49) North Macedonia
- Genres: NuJazz, Classical, Contemporary
- Occupations: composer, performing & recording artist, inventor
- Instruments: Bottlephone, Vibes, Drums, Tuned-Bike-Wheel, Marimba, Musical Glasses, Percussion
- Years active: 1982–2017
- Labels: Aquarius Records, SJF Records
- Formerly of: Les Barons Karamazoff
- Website: zoranmadzirov.com

Zoran Madzirov (14 January 1968 – 9 May 2017) was a Macedonian percussionist, composer and the inventor of the Bottle-phone.

== Biography ==
Zoran Madzirov performed with and was honoured by stars such as Sting, Tito Puente, Tina Turner, Harry Belafonte, Scorpions, Tommy Emmanuel and others. He founded the group Les Barons Karamazoff in 1987 with Edin Karamazov (guitar, lute) and Sasa Dejanovic (Guitar).

Madzirov revolutionised the concept of a solo percussionist by playing the works of great classical composers such as Stravinsky and Mozart on unusual instruments.

The award-winning short film "Glass" was filmed in his honour at the New York Film Academy in Los Angeles.

== Personal life ==
Zoran Madzirov was born and raised in a musical family in Strumica, SFR Yugoslavia. He received his first knowledge of jazz music and percussions from his father. His education led him to Munich and Cologne in Germany.

As an artist and busker on self-made musical instruments made from bottles, he has performed classical music on the streets in major European cities including Milan, Venice, and Copenhagen.

Madzirov died at the age of 49, after a traffic accident in which his vehicle struck a flipped semi-truck on the highway between Strumica and Radovis.

He is survived by his daughter, Nina, and his son, Luben, who strive to continue the legacy of their beloved father.

== Discography ==
- 2006 Bottling Jazzy, Aquarius International
- 2010 Roots On A Roof (Balkano Nuevo), SJF Records – SJF 127
- 2011 – Bottling Classic
- 2011 – Bottlephonia Baroque
