= Independence Day (North Macedonia) =

National holiday in North Macedonia

- Official name: Independence Day of North Macedonia
- Observed by: North Macedonia
- Significance: The declaration of the independence of North Macedonia by referendum.
- Date: 8 September
- Next time: 8 September 2027
- Frequency: annual

Independence Day (Macedonian: Ден на независноста, romanized: Den na nezavisnosta) in North Macedonia is celebrated on 8 September. It has been a national holiday since 1991, when, following a referendum for Independence, Republic of Macedonia gained its independence from Yugoslavia, where it was a federal state, and became a sovereign parliamentary democracy.

== History ==
On 8 September 1991, 95.3% of the 75.7% turnout voters in the referendum voted for the independence of the Republic of Macedonia (now North Macedonia), answering the ambiguous question: Are you for a sovereign and independent state of Macedonia, with a right to enter into any future alliance with the sovereign states of Yugoslavia?

"Dear citizens of Macedonia, allow me tonight to you and to all citizens of Macedonia to congratulate the free, sovereign and independent Macedonia!" - said the President Kiro Gligorov on the evening of 8 September, addressing the citizens who spontaneously gathered at Macedonia Square in the capital Skopje, to celebrate the successful referendum.

The people's will for an independent state was confirmed with the Declaration of the referendum results on 18 September 1991, by the first multi-party Assembly of the Republic of Macedonia. Finally, on 25 September 1991, the Declaration of Independence was adopted by the Assembly. Next, the new Constitution of the Republic of Macedonia was adopted on 17 November 1991.

Due to Greek opposition to a new state containing the term 'Macedonia', the sovereign status of the state was not recognized until 8 April 1993, with an acclamation of the UN General Assembly, when the Republic of Macedonia was admitted as 181st full-fledged member in the world organisation under the provisional reference the Former Yugoslav Republic of Macedonia.

The president of the Macedonian Cinema Union, who discovered five postage stamps dated 8 September 1944, has speculated that 8 September was chosen as a day for the referendum of independent Macedonia in 1991, on the basis of 8 September 1944, when the Independent State of Macedonia was proclaimed.

== Celebration ==
Independence Day as a national holiday is a non-working day in North Macedonia. The President and the Government of North Macedonia organize various festivities. The President traditionally awards the Order 8-September. People traditionally go to picnics in famous picnic places. The Olympic Committee of North Macedonia organizes sports picnics, while the Motorcycle Federation of North Macedonia organizes the International Motorcycle Rally "Macedonia 2008" in Skopje.

All embassies, consulates and representative offices of North Macedonia organize cocktails and festivities in the countries where they are located.
