= Gjorge Ivanov =

President of North Macedonia from 2009 to 2019

- Ѓорге Иванов
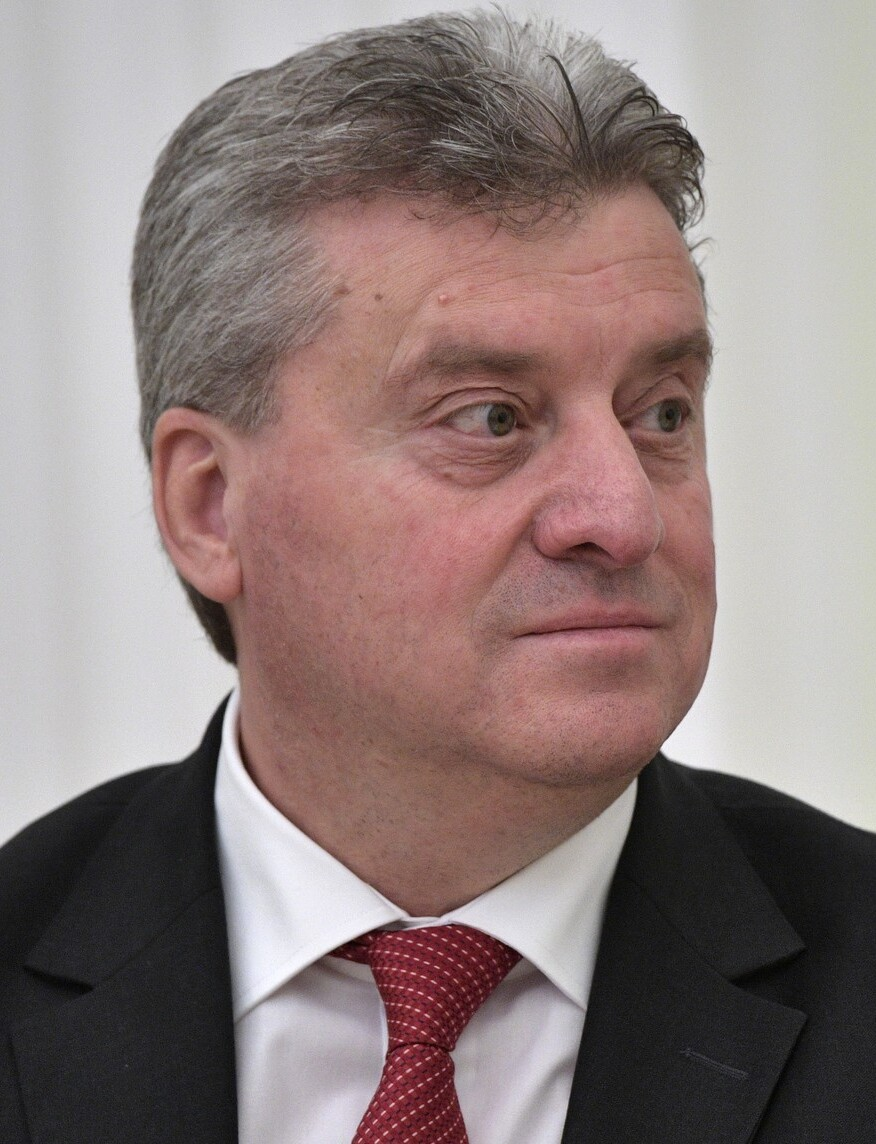
- Ivanov in 2017

President of (North) Macedonia
- In office 12 May 2009 – 12 May 2019
- Prime Minister: Nikola Gruevski; Emil Dimitriev; Zoran Zaev
- Preceded by: Branko Crvenkovski
- Succeeded by: Stevo Pendarovski

Personal details
- Born: 2 May 1960 (age 66) Valandovo, PR Macedonia, FPR Yugoslavia
- Party: VMRO-DPMNE
- Spouse: Maja Ivanova
- Education: Ss. Cyril and Methodius University in Skopje

Gjorge Ivanov (Macedonian: Ѓорге Иванов, pronounced ['ɟɔrɡɛ 'ivanɔf]; born 2 May 1960) is a Macedonian academic and politician, who served as the President of (North) Macedonia from 2009 to 2019.

== Early life and education ==
Ivanov was born in Valandovo on 2 May 1960. He finished primary and secondary school in his hometown. Ivanov graduated from the Law Faculty of the University of Skopje in 1982, received his master's degree in 1994 and his doctorate in 1998 with the thesis "Democracy in Divided Societies, with Special Review for the Republic of Macedonia".

== Political and academic career ==
Ivanov has been politically active since the Yugoslav era, when he pushed for political pluralism and market economy. Until 1990, he was an activist in the League of Socialist Youth of Yugoslavia and a member of the last presidency of the organisation. His political orientation was left-wing. Ivanov has been an expert on civil society, specialising in political management. He is the founder and honorary president of the Macedonian Political Science Association and one of the founding members of the Institute for Democracy Societas Civilis, an analytical centre in North Macedonia.

His professional career began in 1988, when he became an editor at the Macedonian Radio and Television, the national broadcasting station. He later taught political theory and political philosophy at the Law Faculty of the University of Skopje. During this time, he was also a member of Open Society Foundation-Macedonia. In 1999, he became a visiting professor for the Southeast European programme at the University of Athens in Greece.

He was a member of the Board of Directors of the European Postgraduate Studies in Democracy and Human Rights at the University of Bologna in 2000, as well as a coordinator of a course about democracy at the University of Sarajevo. Ss. Cyril and Methodius University of Skopje named him associate professor in 1992 and a full-time professor in 2008. In the same year, he became president of the Council for Accreditation in Higher Education in Macedonia. He became an open supporter of VMRO-DPMNE's politics during the 2000s.

== President of the Republic of (North) Macedonia ==
=== Campaign and election ===
On 25 January 2009, the strongest party in the Macedonian parliament, VMRO-DPMNE, appointed Ivanov as the party's presidential candidate for the presidential election. 1,016 party delegates voted for his candidacy at the party's convention. Although he was proposed as a candidate by VMRO-DPMNE, he was not a member of the party.

During his campaign, Ivanov announced that if he is going to be elected president, he would "insist on a meeting between the President of the Republic of Macedonia and the President of the Republic of Greece" and that one of his highest priorities is the resolution of the country's long-running name dispute with Greece. In the first round on 22 March of the presidential election, 343,374 (35.06%) citizens of the Republic of Macedonia voted for Ivanov, the second being the candidate of the Social Democrats, Ljubomir Frčkoski, with 20.45% of the votes. Ivanov won the second round of the presidential election on 5 April with 453,616 votes; opposition candidate Ljubomir Frčkoski received 264,828 votes.

One day after his election, Ivanov reaffirmed his intention for a meeting to be realised between him and the president of Greece, Karolos Papoulias. He added that he will officialise his invitation just after taking office. After a meeting with the president of the Democratic Union for Integration, Ali Ahmeti, Ivanov announced that he will also include ethnic Albanian intellectuals in his future presidential cabinet. On 16 April, Ivanov on a ceremony received the presidential certificate from the State Election Commission.

=== Inauguration ===
Ivanov took office on 12 May 2009, thereby succeeding Branko Crvenkovski. After taking the oath, he held his inauguration speech in the Macedonian parliament and made public his priorities - EU and NATO membership, economic recovery, inner stability, interethnic relations and good relations with the neighbouring countries, especially with Greece. The swearing-in ceremony was attended by Crvenkovski, prime minister Nikola Gruevski, the first president of independent Republic of Macedonia Kiro Gligorov, military officials, leaders of the religious communities in Macedonia and foreign ambassadors in the country. Also, four foreign statesmen were present — the president of Serbia Boris Tadić, the president of Montenegro Filip Vujanović, the president of Croatia Stjepan Mesić and the president of Albania Bamir Topi. Later that day Ivanov held bilateral talks with the four presidents.

=== First term ===
On the day Ivanov officially became president of his country, he sent a letter to the president of the United States Barack Obama in which he underlined the Republic of Macedonia's aim to join NATO and EU and to find a "mutually acceptable solution" to the "name difference" with neighbouring Greece. He also thanked Obama for his words of support at the 2009 NATO Summit.

One day after the inauguration, Ivanov together with Prime Minister Gruevski travelled to Brussels to meet with European Union and NATO officials.

Ivanov claimed to promote a Macedonian model of a multi-ethnic society and Pax Europaea, a united Europe living in peace and respecting the diversity and identity of the nations of Europe. On 20 June 2012, he approved a lustration law, regarded as unconstitutional by some human rights groups, and a lawsuit was filed against him in July. In 2013, he expressed support for Turkish president Recep Tayyip Erdoğan during the anti-government protests in Turkey, which resulted in some Macedonians criticising him and others supporting him.

=== Second term ===
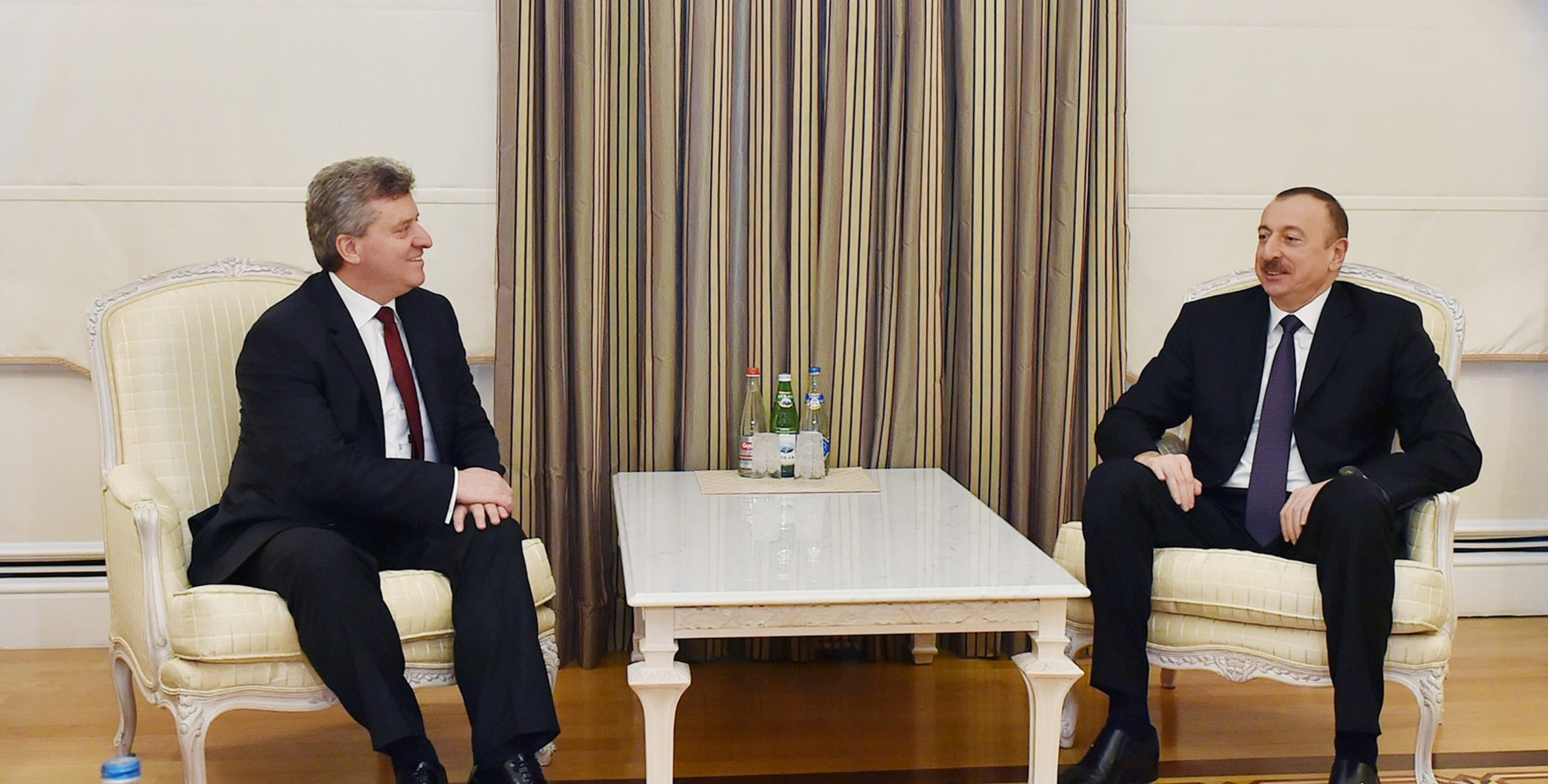
Ivanov with Azerbaijani President Ilham Aliyev in Baku, 10 March 2016

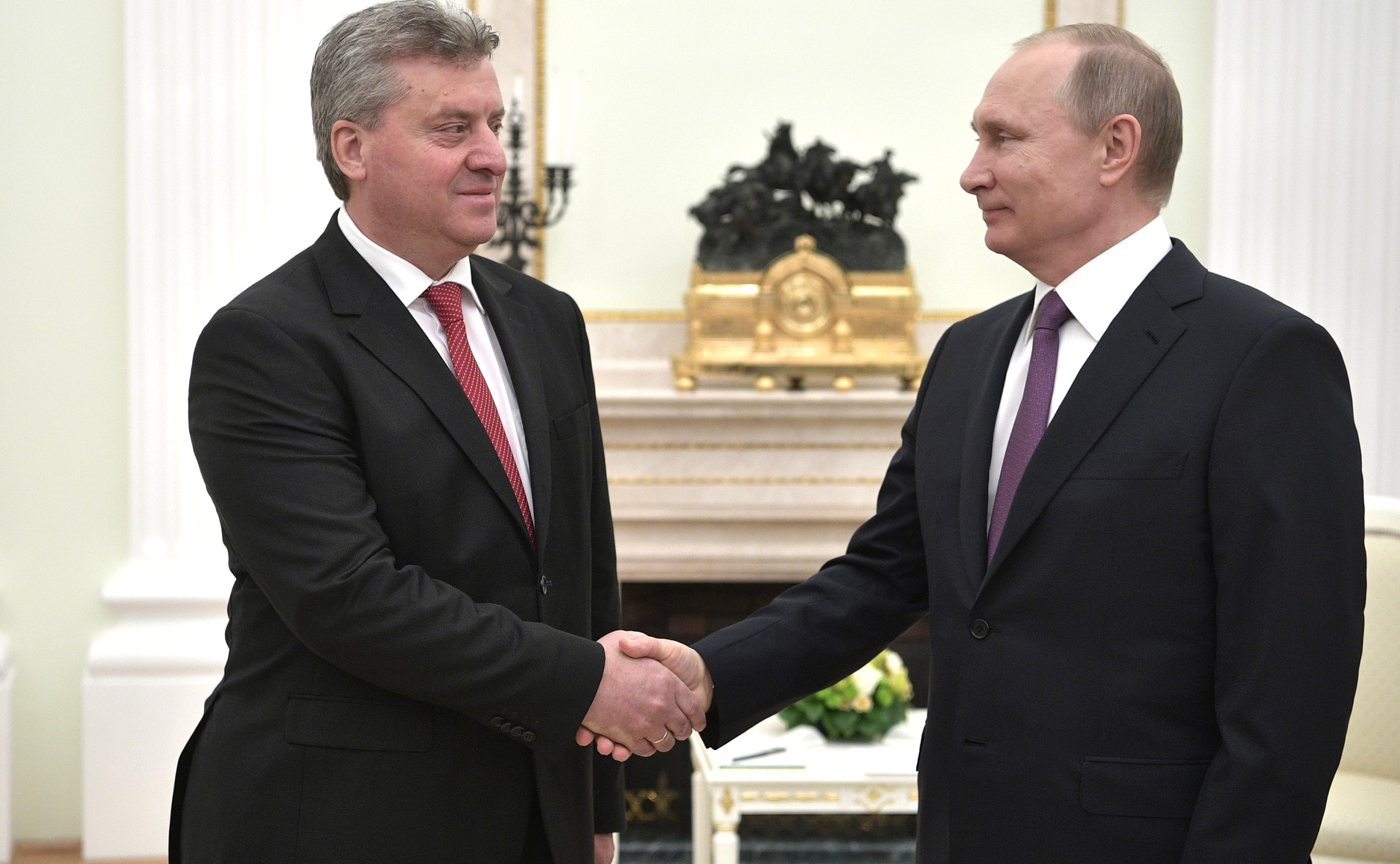
Ivanov with Russian President Vladimir Putin in Moscow, 24 May 2017

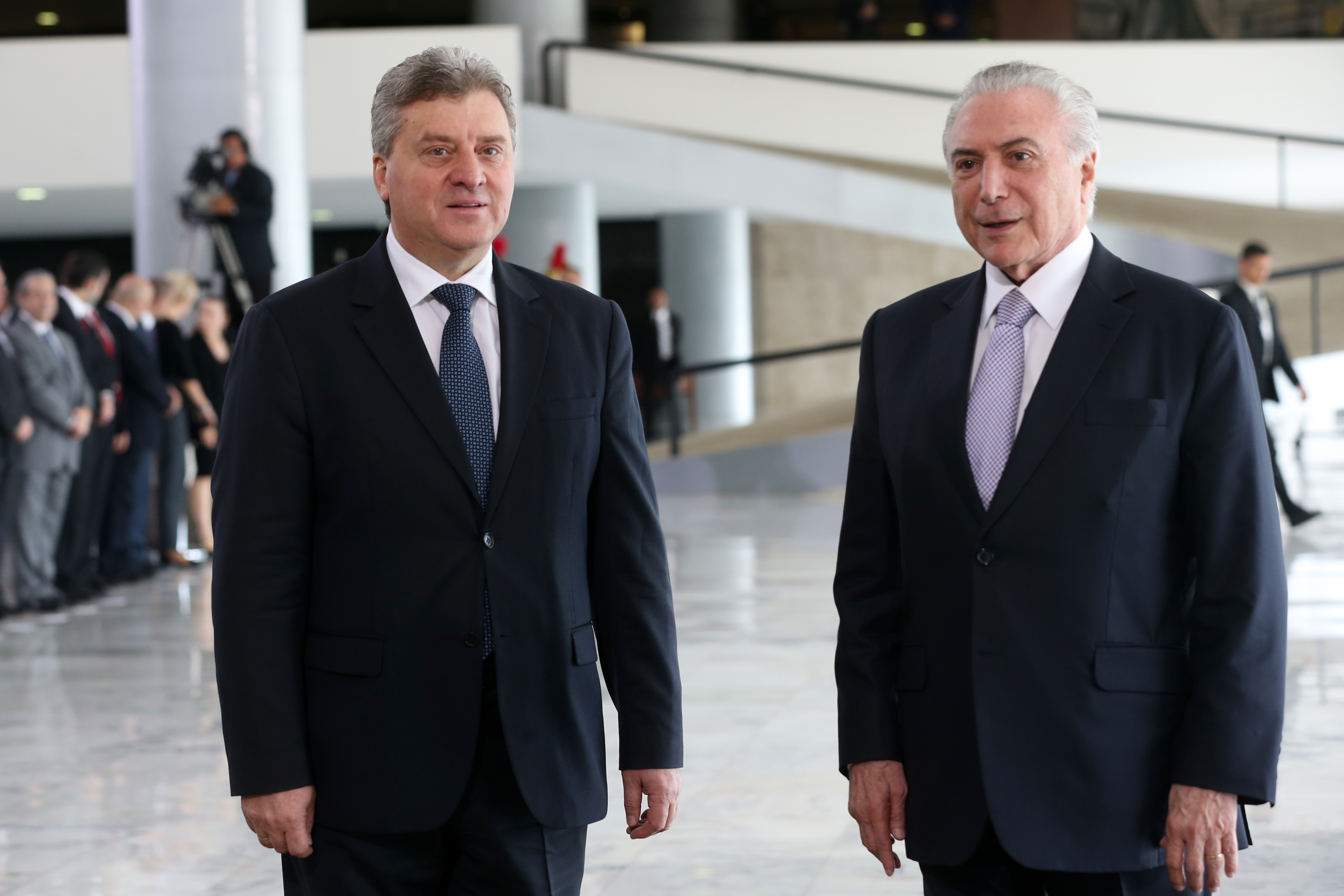
Ivanov with Brazilian President Michel Temer in Brasília, 12 December 2017

His ally, Gruevski, supported his election. Ivanov was re-elected as President of the Republic of Macedonia for a second term on 27 April 2014. The State Election Commission certified his new presidential term on 2 May. The second inauguration of Ivanov was held on 12 May in the Macedonian parliament. The swearing-in ceremony was attended by Gruevski, military officials, leaders of the religious communities in Macedonia and foreign ambassadors in the county. The inauguration was boycotted by the Democratic Union for Integration, the largest Albanian political party in the Republic of Macedonia and the Social Democratic Union of Macedonia, the largest opposition party in Macedonia. Foreign dignitaries did not attend too.

In March 2016, Ivanov stated that the European Union and Germany had failed the Republic of Macedonia and other Balkan countries in the European migrant crisis, and claimed that Macedonia did not receive any funding. The German Chancellery rejected his criticism. The Chancellery and the European Commission disputed his claim about the funding.

On 12 April 2016, Ivanov halted judicial inquiries into officials involved in a wiretap scandal. Ivanov stated to have done so in the best interest of the country, and to end the political crisis. A move that the opposition called Ivanov's coup d'état and an effective disagreement to cooperate and find a common ground solution to the problem. EU officials condemned this decision. His own party, VMRO-DPMNE, did not agree with his action. Opposition media called it a political manoeuvre to prevent further judicial inquiry by the special prosecutor Katica Janeva, proposed by the international community to normalise the political situation. Opposition leader Zoran Zaev subsequently called for protests. It resulted in the protest movement called Colourful Revolution. Mass protests against his pardons occurred in Skopje on 13 April, when his presidential office in the centre of the city was demolished by protesters and several people were arrested. Anti-government rallies also spread in other cities. US Deputy Assistant Secretary of State Hoyt Yee requested that the pardons be annulled on 19 May. On 27 May and 6 June, under domestic and international pressure, he annulled his pardons. On 21 June, the parliament declined SDSM's motion to impeach him.

The 2016 parliamentary elections ended in a stalemate. Gruevski failed to form a governmental coalition because he was unable to reach an understanding with Albanian parties. His office in Skopje was renovated and reopened in 2017. In March 2017, he refused to give SDSM a mandate to form a governmental cabinet, violating the constitution. This move was criticised by domestic legal scholars. Ivanov claimed that he refused because the unity, sovereignty and independence of the country were threatened, which was assessed as false by fact-checking service Truthmeter. After Zaev guaranteed the preservation of the unitary character, territorial integrity and sovereignty of Macedonia, Ivanov gave him the mandate on 17 May. In 17 January 2018, he vetoed the Law on the Use of Languages, which extends the official usage of the Albanian language in the country. He visited Turkey in February 2018, seeking support from the country in the naming dispute with Greece, while Turkey expected support against Fethullah Gülen's supporters after the 2016 coup attempt. He stated in June that he would not sign a name change deal with Greece, claiming that it gave too many concessions. In September, he called on voters to boycott the country's name change referendum in an address in the 73rd session of the United Nations General Assembly, referring to it as a "historical suicide." After the country's name was changed to North Macedonia in 2019 as a result of the Prespa agreement, Ivanov refused to sign laws that contained the new name and to rename the name of his office. He was succeeded by Stevo Pendarovski, who won the 2019 presidential election, and attended his inauguration ceremony on 12 May.

== Personal life and views ==
Ivanov is married to Maja Ivanova. Together they have a son named Ivan. He is an ethnic Macedonian. Ivanov has seen liberal democracy as important. In an interview for the BGNES news agency in 2016, Ivanov said there is no language barrier between his country and Bulgaria and expressed his desire for Bulgaria to be the country's fervent supporter. He has declared himself as an Orthodox Christian.

=== Published works ===
Ivanov authored the following works:

- Цивилно општество (Civil Society)
- Демократијата во поделените општества: македонскиот модел (Democracy in divided societes: the Macedonian Model)
- Современи политички теории (Current political theories)
- Политички теории - Антика (Political theories - Antiquity)

== Awards and honours ==
=== Honours ===
- 2011 - Highest decoration of the Order of "Saint Lazarus" of Jerusalem
- 2012 - Order of the European Movement of Bosnia and Herzegovina
- 2013 - Imperial Knight of Honor of the Order of St. George from House of Habsburg
- 2015 - Honorary Citizen of Pustec
- 2015 - Order Baptist (Preteca) from Saint Jovan Bigorski Monastery
- 2015 - Jubilee Medal "70 Years of Victory in the Great Patriotic War 1941–1945" from Russian Federation

=== Awards ===
- 2011 - Recognition for leadership in reducing disaster risk from the International Strategy for Disaster Reduction of the United Nations
- 2012 - Peace and Sport' award from Peace and Sport International Forum
- 2014 - The Fund for American Studies (TFAS) Freedom Award
- 2014 - Prix de la Fondation from Crans Montana Forum
- 2016 - Isa Beg Ishaković international award from Isa Beg Ishaković Foundation
- 2017 - Flame of peace award from the Association for the Furtherance of Peace
- 2017 - Patriarch Alexey II of Moscow Award from International Public Foundation for the Unity of Orthodox Christian Nations

=== Professor/doctor honoris causa ===
University	Title	Year of awarding
Bulgarian Academy of Sciences	Honorary Doctor	2016
Nevşehir Hacı Bektaş Veli University	Honorary Doctor	2015
Moscow State University	Honorary Professor	2014
Southwest University	Honorary Professor	2013
Istanbul University	Honorary Doctor	2011
TOBB University of Economics and Technology	Honorary Doctor	2011
Dimitrie Cantemir Christian University	Honorary Doctor	2011

Political offices
Preceded by Branko Crvenkovski	President of North Macedonia; 2009–2019	Succeeded by Stevo Pendarovski
