= Stevo Pendarovski =

President of North Macedonia from 2019 to 2024

- Стево Пендаровски
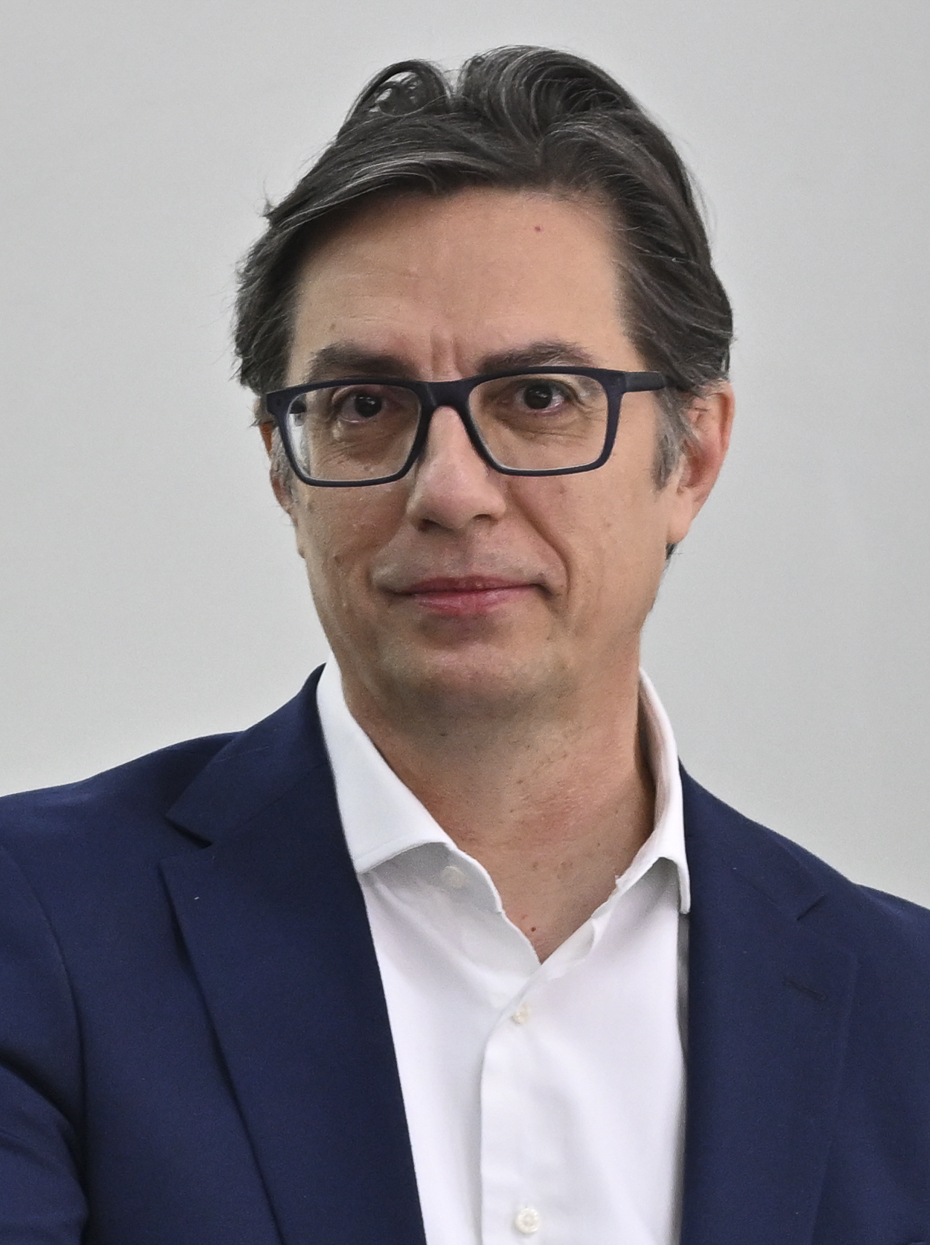
- Pendarovski in 2024

President of North Macedonia
- In office 12 May 2019 – 12 May 2024
- Prime Minister: Zoran Zaev; Oliver Spasovski; Zoran Zaev; Dimitar Kovačevski; Talat Xhaferi
- Preceded by: Gjorge Ivanov
- Succeeded by: Gordana Siljanovska-Davkova

Personal details
- Born: 3 April 1963 (age 63) Skopje, PR Macedonia, FPR Yugoslavia (modern North Macedonia)
- Party: Social Democratic Union
- Spouse: Elizabeta Gjorgievska
- Children: 1
- Education: Ss. Cyril and Methodius University of Skopje

Stevo Pendarovski (Note: Macedonian: Стево Пендаровски, pronounced ['stɛvɔ pɛn'darɔfski]) (born 3 April 1963) is a Macedonian politician who served as the President of North Macedonia from 2019 to 2024.

== Early life and education ==
Stevo Pendarovski was born on 3 April 1963 in Skopje. His family originates from Galičnik. He grew up in post-earthquake Skopje. His parents were teachers. Pendarovski started his elementary studies at the then-Dositej Obradovikj School in Skopje (current-day Panajot Ginovski School) while he finished his secondary studies at the Cvetan Dimov gymnasium.

Pendarovski earned a Bachelor of Laws degree from Ss. Cyril and Methodius University of Skopje in 1987, later earning his MA and Ph.D. degrees in Political Science from the same university.

== Political career ==
As a law graduate, Pendarovski first worked as a trainee in a law office in Skopje, but later left and got a job at the Ministry of Internal Affairs, where he worked as a security analyst. In 1998, he was appointed head of the Ministry of Internal Affairs' Analysis and Research Administration and a spokesman for the ministry, in the capacity of Deputy Minister of Public Relations. He was a spokesman for the Ministry of Internal Affairs during the country's 2001 armed conflict.

In 2001, Pendarovski joined the cabinet of President Boris Trajkovski, where he worked as a national security advisor. President Trajkovski and eight other people, including three members of his cabinet, died in a plane crash in Bosnia and Herzegovina on 26 February 2004. When the plane crash happened, Pendarovski was in Dublin as a representative of President Trajkovski in the state delegation that was due to submit the country's application for EU membership that day, which was subsequently postponed.

For a short period, from 2004 to 2005, Pendarovski headed the State Election Commission. In 2005, he returned to the presidential cabinet, this time as an advisor to President Branko Crvenkovski on national security and later on foreign policy. Pendarovski left the presidential cabinet in 2009, when Crvenkovski ended his presidency.

Pendarovski began teaching at the University American College in Skopje in 2008. Some of the areas he has taught and researched are: international relations, intelligence and national security, geopolitics, globalization, US foreign policy, EU foreign and security policy, small states in international relations and others.

On 4 March 2014, Pendarovski was elected by the main opposition party in Macedonia, the Social Democratic Union, as its candidate for the April 2014 presidential election.

=== Presidency (2019–2024) ===
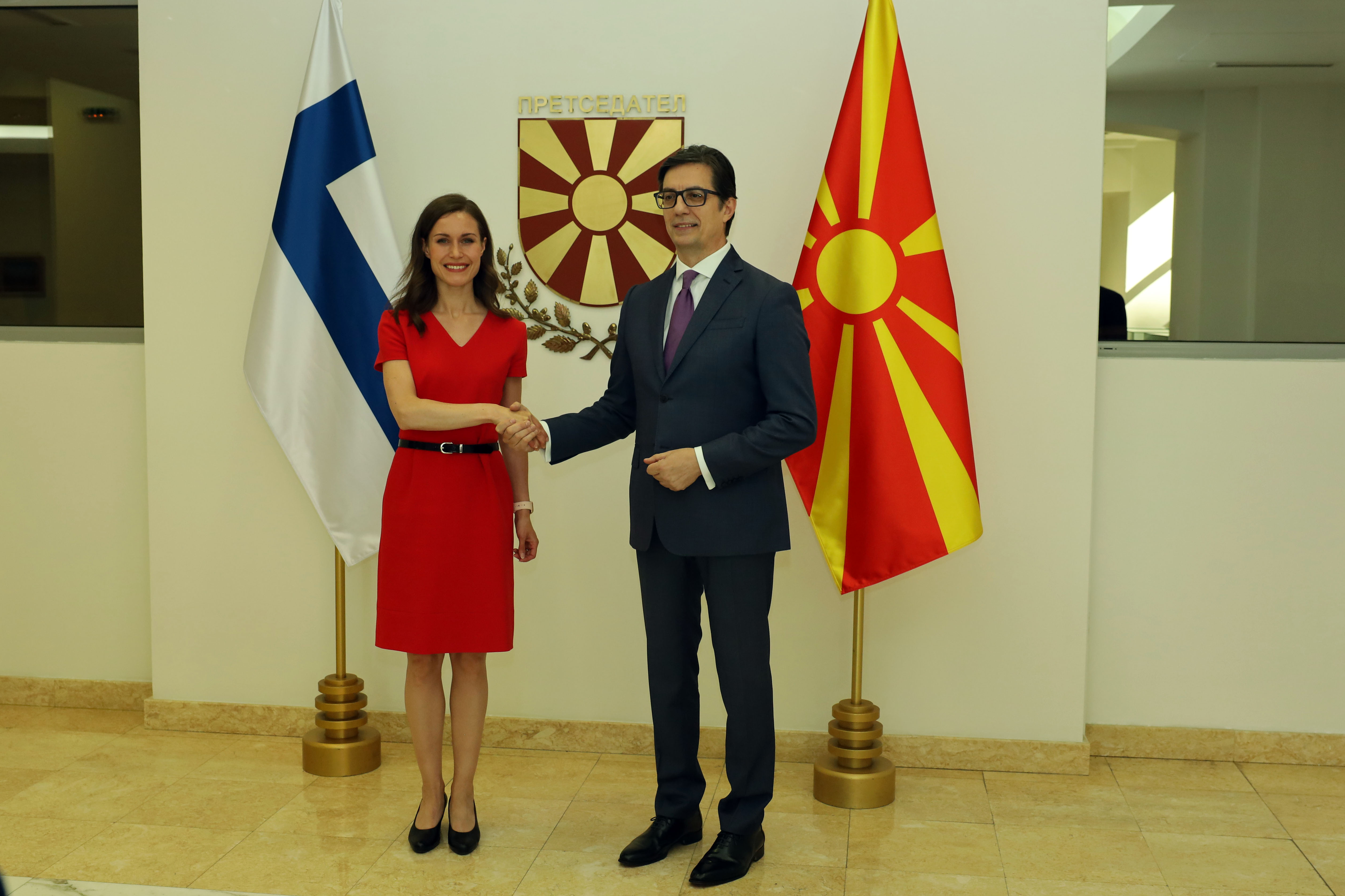
Pendarovski with then Finnish Prime Minister Sanna Marin in Skopje on 20 June 2022

Pendarovski ran in the 2019 election as a presidential candidate of the Social Democratic Union and the Democratic Union for Integration. He went on to win 436,212 votes in the second round of the presidential election, 51.66% of the votes cast.

During the COVID-19 pandemic, Pendarovski introduced the nation's first ever state of emergency to contain the coronavirus, a move that paved the way for a 2020 parliamentary election.

In February 2022, Pendarovski was seen walking with Embla Ademi, an 11-year-old girl with Down syndrome, to her elementary school in Gostivar after he heard she was being bullied.

== Personal life ==
Pendarovski is married to Elizabeta Gjorgievska, a medical doctor who works at the Clinic for Pediatric and Preventive Dentistry and a professor at the Faculty of Dentistry in Skopje. They have one child, named Ognen.

== Honours and awards ==
- Poland: Knight of the Order of the White Eagle (24 October 2022)

== Notes ==
Political offices
Preceded by Gjorge Ivanov	President of North Macedonia; 2019–2024	Succeeded by Gordana Siljanovska-Davkova
