= Insurgency in Macedonia =

Insurgency in Macedonia may refer to:

- National Liberation War of Macedonia
- Insurgency in Macedonia (2001)
