= People's Liberation War =

People's Liberation War may refer to:

- People's Liberation War (Yugoslavia), conflict in occupied World War II Yugoslavia, resulting in the establishment of the Yugoslav Federation
  - National Liberation War of Macedonia, a sub-conflict of the Yugoslav People's Liberation War
- last three years of the Chinese Civil War, referred to in the People's Republic of China as the "People's Liberation War"
- Korean War, referred to in North Korea as the "People's Liberation War"
- Vietnam War, esp. the southern campaigns by the Viet Cong, referred to in Vietnam was the "War of People's Liberation"
- Greek Civil War, sometimes referred to as the People's Liberation War by Greek communists
