= Bulgarian anti-guerrilla detachments in Vardar Macedonia during World War II =

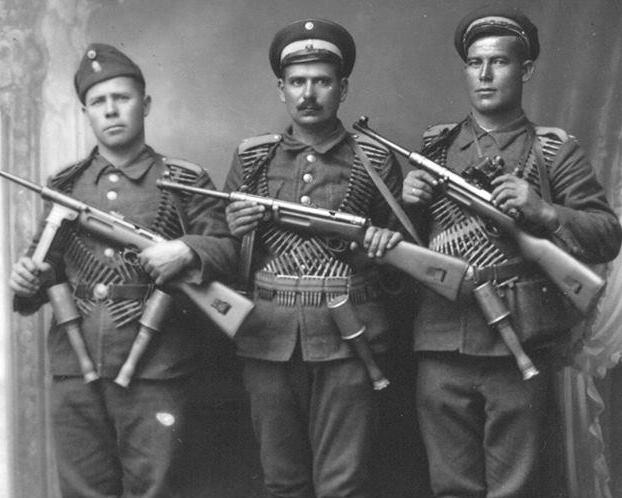
Members of Bulgarian anti-guerrilla detachment in 1943.

The Bulgarian anti-guerrilla detachments, also called counter-chetas were paramilitary units, created with the help of Bulgarian authorities to fight the Macedonian partisans in Vardar Macedonia during the Second World War.

== Activity ==
The units assisted the Bulgarian authorities, police and the army. At that time, the authorities claimed the communist partisans were in fact Serbian chetniks, and on this occasion the counter-squads were mobilized. They were usually led by veterans of the Mihailovist wing of the Internal Macedonian Revolutionary Organization. Their formation was approved by the Minister of the Interior Petar Gabrovski at the suggestion of the Skopje police chief Stefan Simeonov, who was a former activist of the Internal Dobrujan Revolutionary Organisation. His chief advisor was the local activist Trajko Čundev. The first detachment was created at the end of 1942 in Veles, and was headed by Pano Manev. However, by 1942, the initial pro‑Bulgarian sentiment in the region had faded amid policies of "forcible Bulgarianisation" of the local population and recruitment efforts attracted only about 200 people. These units were particularly active in punitive operations directed against Serbian colonists in the region and by their deportation. Counter-chetas were also active in fighting the Serbian Chetnik formations of Kosta Pećanac in the north. The existing partisan detachments were suppressed with the help of the counter-chetniks in early 1943. After the withdrawal of Bulgarian authorities from the region in September 1944, and Ivan Mihailov's subsequent refusal to form a pro-German puppet state, most of the participants were killed in combat with the Macedonian partisans or were subsequently captured and convicted by the new communist authorities in Yugoslavia and Bulgaria.

== See also ==
- Ohrana
- Bulgarian Action Committees
