= World War II in Yugoslav Macedonia =

Part of World War II in Yugoslavia

- Part of World War II in Yugoslavia
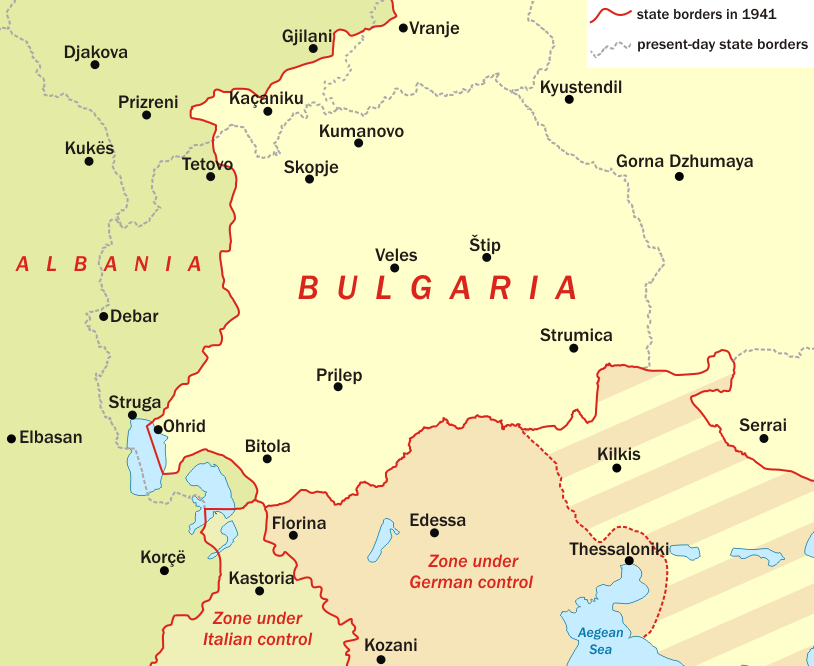
- Map of Vardar Macedonia during World War II. The area was divided between Albania and Bulgaria and the frontier between them run approximately along the line: Struga – Tetovo – Gjilan – Vranje. (3 years, 7 months, 1 week and 5 days)
| Location | parts of the wider region of Macedonia |
| Result | Soviet strategic offensive in the area backed by the reorganised Bulgarian Army and aided by the Yugoslav, Albanian and Greek Partisans.; Formation of communist states after the German retreat: |
| Territorial changes | Part of Vardar Banovina (Vardar Macedonia) became SR Macedonia as part of SFR Yugoslavia |

Belligerents
| (Democratic Federal Yugoslavia) Yugoslav Partisans; Macedonian Partisans; Bulgaria (from Sep. 1944); LANÇ | Chetniks | Bulgaria (until Sep. 1944); Germany; Italy (until Sep. 1943); Albania (until Sep. 1943); Albania (from Sep. 1943); Pećanac Chetniks; Balli Kombëtar |

Commanders and leaders
| (Democratic Federal Yugoslavia) Josip Broz Tito (Note: Limited influence and control, de jure Commander); (Democratic Federal Yugoslavia) Svetozar Vukmanović (Note: Link between Mihajlo Apostolski and Josip Broz Tito, Supervisor); Mihajlo Apostolski; Metodija Andonov; Mirče Acev †; Kuzman Josifovski †; Vladimir Stoychev; Boyan Urumov; Asen Sirakov | (Chetniks) Draža Mihailović (executed); (Chetniks) Milivoje Trbić †; (Chetniks) Stojan Krstić | (Tsardom of Bulgaria (1908–1946)) Bogdan Filov (executed); (Tsardom of Bulgaria (1908–1946)) Nikola Mikhov (executed); (Tsardom of Bulgaria (1908–1946)) Vasil Boydev; (Tsardom of Bulgaria (1908–1946)) Konstantin Stoyanov †; (Nazi Germany) Alexander Löhr (executed); (Chetniks) Kosta Pećanac †; Xhemo Hasa †; Mefail Shehu †; Gajur Deralla † |

Strength
| 1,000 (1941); 2,000 (1942); 8,000 (Sep. 1944); 66,000 (Dec. 1944); 110,000 (April 1945); 340,000 Bulgarian soldiers in Southern Serbia and Vardar Macedonia (October – December 1944) | ~32,000 Bulgarian soldiers in Southern Serbia and Vardar Macedonia (May 1941 – September 1944); ~300,000 (Army Group E in October 1944) ~8,000 Chetniks | |

Casualties and losses
| Total Yugoslav casualties: 24,000; By nationality: 7,000 Jews, 6,724 ethnic Macedonians, 6,000 Serbs, 4,000 Albanians; 1,000 Bulgarians, Aromanians, Roma and Turks; By affiliation: 2,000 civilians, 1,000 collaborationists, 11,000 soldiers and partisans 7,000 victims of concentration camps | Bulgarian casualties:: ca. 4,500 soldiers in the Autumn of 1944 | |

World War II in Yugoslav Macedonia started with the Axis invasion of Yugoslavia in April 1941. Under the pressure of the Yugoslav Partisan movement, part of the Macedonian communists began in October 1941 a political and military campaign to resist the occupation of Vardar Macedonia. Officially, the area was called then Vardar Banovina, because the use of very name Macedonia was avoided in the Kingdom of Yugoslavia. Most of its territory was occupied by Bulgaria, while its westernmost part was ceded to Albania, both aided by German and Italian troops. Initially, there was no organised resistance in the region because the majority of the Macedonian Slavs nurtured strong pro-Bulgarian sentiments, although this was an effect from the previous repressive Kingdom of Yugoslavia rule which had negative impact on the majority of the population. Even the local Communists, separated from the Yugoslav and joined the Bulgarian Communist Party. However, even those Macedonians who felt that they were Bulgarians soon discovered that the Bulgarians from Bulgaria were suspicious of them and considered them "backward Bulgarians" or second-class Bulgarians. In fact, Bulgarian authorities began a process of oppressive Bulgarianization as they realised that only part of the Macedonian population felt Bulgarian or was pro-Bulgarian. Some researchers describe this process as "re-Bulgarisation" and "de-Serbianisation". The occupation troops acted just as viciously and arrogantly toward the local population as did the officials. Thus, they soon became an object of disgust from the population, especially these who felt themselves Macedonians, developed strong resentment towards the Bulgarian regime as it acted the same way as the Serbian one before.

The wartime national chauvinism and suffering backlash generated some support for the Communist Partisans, whose power started to grow only in 1943 with the capitulation of Italy and the Soviet victories over Nazi Germany, which turned the tide in the war and the partisans actions became more successful. The role of the Bulgarian communists, who avoided organizing mass armed resistance, was also a key factor, their influence over the Macedonian Committee remained dominant until 1943. Another key factor was the main goal of the Yugoslav Partisans which could not inspire and attract Macedonians who saw it as a reestablishment of Yugoslavia and the Serbian rule. This changed, when in the beginning of 1943, Tito's special emissary Svetozar Vukmanović arrived in Macedonia. Vukmanović had to activate the struggle and give a Macedonian "facade" to the form and content, as well as to the aims and aspirations of it in order to secure participation of Macedonians. He was supposed to set up a Macedonian Communist Party within the framework of the Yugoslav one, which would include only activists loyal to the Yugoslav agenda. They formed in 1943 the People's Liberation Army of Macedonia and the Macedonian Communist Party in the western part of the area, where the Albanian Partisans also participated in the resistance movement. The Macedonian Communist Party would lead the effort, not for the restoration of the old Yugoslavia, but above all for the liberation and unification of Macedonia and a new federal union of Yugoslav peoples with an extension of its prewar territory. This appeal attracted more young people to the armed resistance. All of the previous led to the rise of an younger anti-Bulgarian oriented generation of partisan leaders, who were loyal to Yugoslavia.

After Bulgaria switched sides in the war in September 1944, the Bulgarian 5th. Army stationed in Macedonia, moved back to the old borders of Bulgaria. In the early October the newly formed Bulgarian People's Army together with the Red Army reentered occupied Yugoslavia to blocking the German forces withdrawing from Greece. Yugoslav Macedonia was liberated in the end of November.

The communist resistance is called by the Macedonian historiography the National Liberation Struggle (Macedonian: Народноослободителна борба (НОБ), Narodnoosloboditelna borba (NOB)). Some of the combatants also developed aspirations for independence of the region of Macedonia, but were suppressed at the end of the war by the communist authorities. It marked the defeat of Bulgarian nationalism and the victory of the pro-Yugoslav Macedonian nationalism in the area. As result the post-WWII Communist authorities persecuted the former collaborationists with the charges of "Great Bulgarian chauvinism" and cracked down on pro-Bulgarian organisations that supported ideas of Greater Bulgaria and those which opposed the Yugoslav idea and insisted on Macedonian independence.

== Background ==
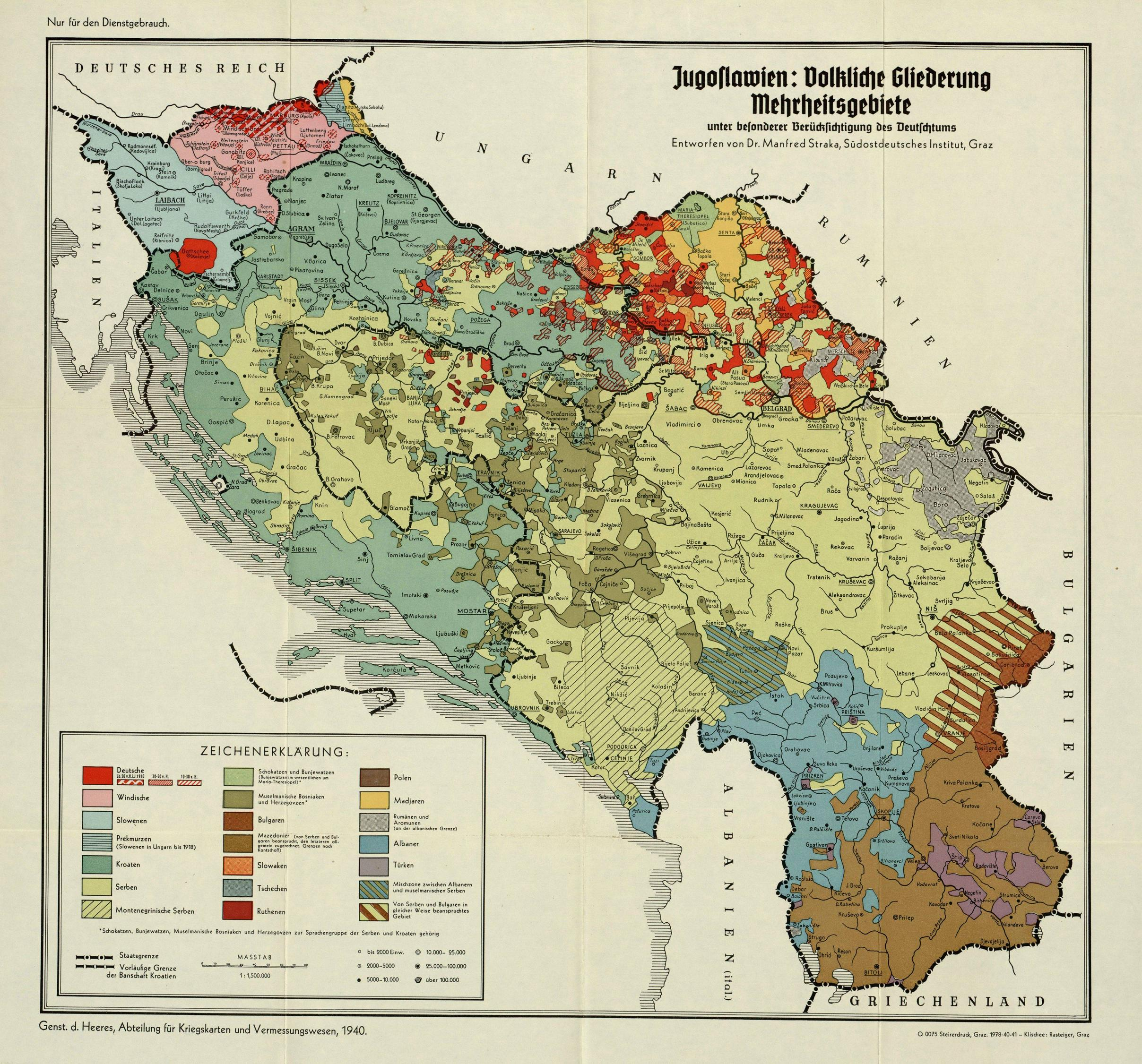
German ethnic map of Yugoslavia from 1940. Macedonians are depicted as a separate community, and described as claimed by Serbs and Bulgarians, but generally attributed to the last ones (the spread of the Macedonians/Bulgarians is according to Kanchov).

The Balkan Wars in 1912 and 1913, and the World War I (1914–1918) divided the region of Macedonia amongst the Kingdom of Greece, the Kingdom of Bulgaria and the Kingdom of Serbia. The territory was up until that time part of the Ottoman Empire. In those days, most of the minority Ottoman Macedonias' Slavic intelligentsia who had developed some sense of national consciousness considered themselves to be a part of the Bulgarian community. Although the affiliation of most Macedonian Slavs to different national camps was purely superficial and not ethnic, but rather political and flexible option imposed by the nationalist educational and religious propaganda or by terrorism.

From 1912 until 1915 the territory of Vardar Macedonia remained within the territory of Serbia. In the parts administered by Serbia the new authorities forced out most of the Bulgarian Exarchist priests and teachers, and began implementing a forceful state-sponsored Serbianisation of Slavic-speaking Macedonians. It was occupied by Kingdom of Bulgaria during World War I between 1915 and 1918. Afterwards it was restored back to Serbia and consequently included as part of the Vardar Banovina in the Kingdom of Yugoslavia. During that period, there were two main autonomist agendas.

The right-wing Internal Macedonian Revolutionary Organization (IMRO) led by Ivan Mihailov, was in favor of the creation of a pro-Bulgarian Macedonian state under German and Italian protection. By 1928, Mihailov proposed a new plan calling for unification of Macedonia region into a single state, that would be independent from Bulgaria but with prevailing ethnic Bulgarian population. However the new state would to be supranational and cantonized, something as "Switzerland on the Balkans". Nevertheless, this IMRO continued to support Bulgarian irredentism until it was dissolved in the mid of 1930s.

The leftist IMRO (United) who was sponsored directly by the Comintern favored a creation of an independent and unified Macedonia within a Balkan Federation with a separate Macedonian nation and Macedonian language. This idea was backed up in 1934 by the resolution of the Comintern on the Macedonian question. This option was supported by Pavel Shatev, Dimitar Vlahov, Metodi Shatorov, Panko Brashnarov, and others. However, such Macedonian activists, who came from IMRO (United) never managed to get rid of their pro-Bulgarian bias. After the organization was dissolved in the mid of 1930s, most of the members ended up joining the Bulgarian Communist Party.

During the interwar period in Vardar Macedonia, a separate Macedonian national consciousness was growing. The government and its widespread massive Serbianisation campaign was unsuccessful in trying to eliminate the traces of an emerging Macedonian national consciousness among the local population. The failed assimilation of the region was due to Serb policies that were exploitative and colonial and not directed toward integration. Funds were controlled from Belgrade and the economy was geared toward resource extraction whose raw materials were bought by the government at low prices it determined for itself. The state controlled the local tobacco monopoly and acquired a steady and sizable amount of revenue without investing much in return to raise the living standards of the inhabitants. The government in Belgrade or the wider administration showed little concern toward conditions within the region. A high rate of turnover existed among ministers and officials who mainly showed up prior to elections or to advance their own career and often staff in the local administration from other parts of the country were incompetent and corrupt. Locals were excluded from involvement in the sociopolitical system, suppression of elites occurred and state security forces instilled an environment of fear among inhabitants. New arrivals of Serb colonists to the region were favoured over the local population regarding state employment, loans and agricultural reform and both groups continued to be separate from each other.

Nevertheless, the existence of considerable Macedonian national consciousness prior to the middle of the 1940s is disputed. At the beginning of the occupation anti-Serbian and pro-Bulgarian feelings among the local population prevailed.

== Occupation of Yugoslav Macedonia ==
=== Invasion of Yugoslavia ===
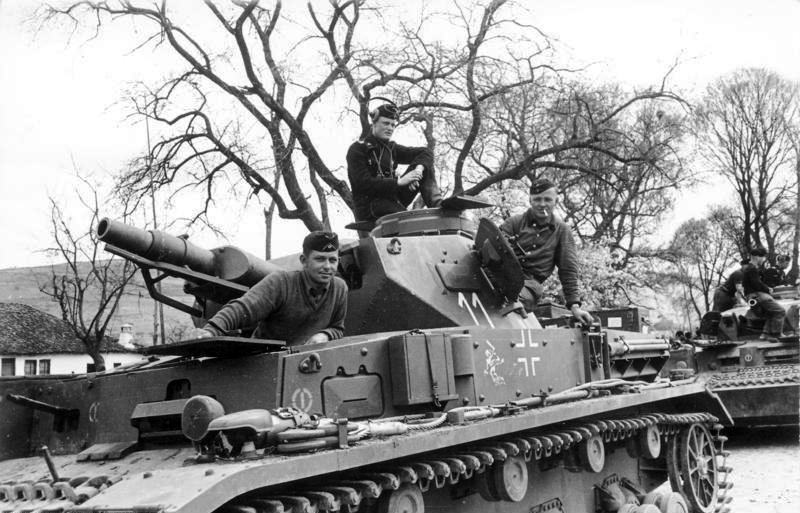
German 11th Panzer Division advancing into Yugoslavia from Bulgaria as part of the Twelfth Army.

Fearing an invasion by the Axis powers, Regent Prince Paul of Yugoslavia signed the Tripartite Pact on 25 March 1941, pledging cooperation with the Axis. On 27 March, the regime of Prince Paul was overthrown by a military coup d'état with British support. The 17-year-old Peter II of Yugoslavia was declared to be of age and placed in power. General Dušan Simović became his Prime Minister. The Kingdom of Yugoslavia withdrew its support for the Axis de facto without formally renouncing the Pact. On 6 April 1941, the German armed forces (Wehrmacht), along with the armed forces of Italy and Hungary, launched the invasion of the Kingdom of Yugoslavia and quickly conquered it. The country was subsequently divided between the Germans, Italians, Hungarians and Bulgarians, who took most of Macedonia. When the Bulgarians entered Yugoslav Macedonia, the people greeted them with high enthusiasm. Crowds in Skopje flew banners that greeted the unification of Macedonia and Bulgaria. The warm welcome was largely an effect of the almost three decades long, suffering and despised Serbian dominance.

=== Division of Vardar Banovina ===
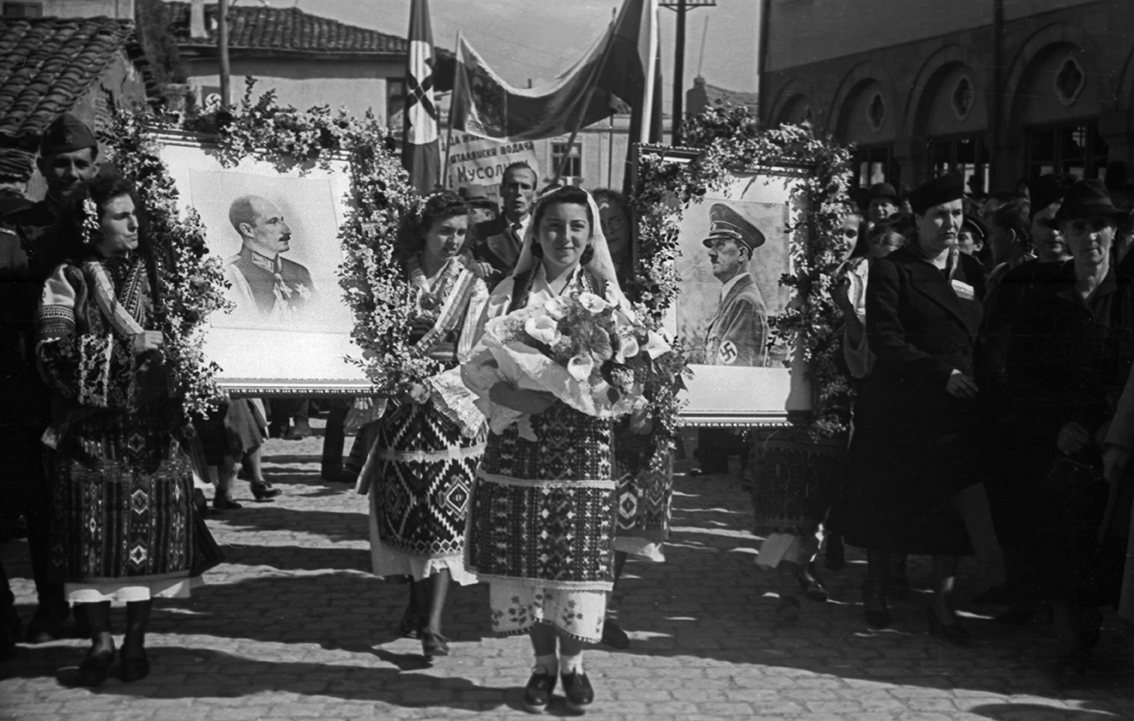
A crowd in Skopje on 20 April 1941 celebrating the entry of the Bulgarian Army and displaying banners praising the Axis invasion in Macedonia.

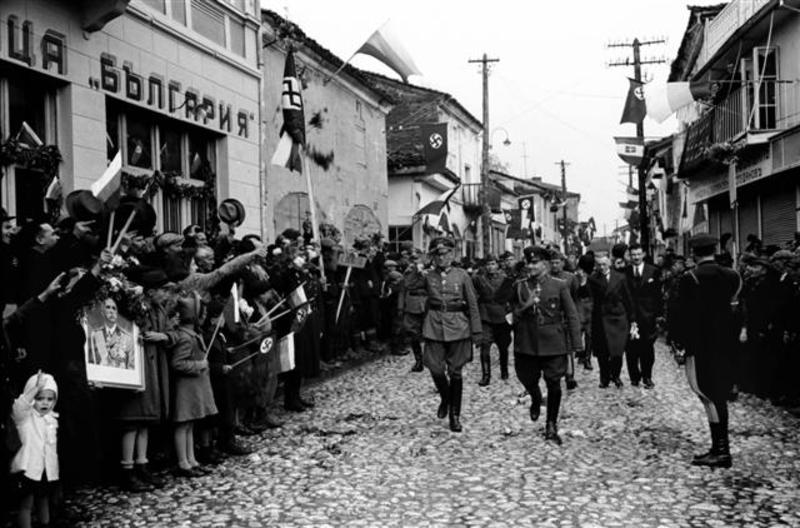
Transfer of the city of Ohrid (today in North Macedonia) by the Italian fascist authorities to Bulgarian administration through German Nazis' intermediation under the acclamations of the local Slavic population (May 1941).

A division of Vardar Macedonia, then part of the Vardar Banovina, was drawn up on 19 and 20 April 1941. Bulgarian troops entered the central and eastern parts and seized most of the banovina, including parts of Eastern Serbia and Kosovo. The most prominent force which occupied most of the area was the 5th Army. The westernmost parts of Macedonia were occupied by the fascist Kingdom of Italy.

=== Collaborationist organizations ===
Bulgarian action committees – After the defeat of the Yugoslav army, a group of Macedonian Bulgarians headed by Spiro Kitincev arrived in Macedonia and started preparations for the coming of the Bulgarian army and administration in Macedonia. The first of the Bulgarian Action Committees was formed in Skopje on 13 April 1941. Former IMRO members in Vardar Macedonia were active members of this committee. On 13 April 1941, at a meeting in Skopje, it was decided that one of the first tasks of the newly formed organisation was to regulate the relations with the German authorities. With the intercession of the committees and Bulgarian administration more than 12,000 Yugoslav Macedonian POWs who had been conscripted into the Yugoslav army were released by German, Italian and Hungarian authorities. With the arrival of the Bulgarian army mass expulsion of Serbian colonists from Vardar Macedonia took place. Once the region and administration became organized, the Action Committees became marginalized, and were ultimately dissolved.

Balli Kombëtar in Macedonia – There were 5,500 Balli Kombëtar militants in Albanian occupied Macedonia, 2,000 of which were Tetovo-based and 500 of which were based in Debar.

Ivan Mihailov's IMRO in Macedonia – After the military Bulgarian coup d'état of 1934 the new Bulgarian government banned IMRO as a terrorist organization. Ivan Mihailov fled to Italy, where he made contact with the Italian fascist authorities and with members of the German secret service (Gestapo). After the defeat of Yugoslavia, Mihailov went to Zagreb and spent the war there with Ante Pavelić. He revitalized parts of his old organisation and ordered them to enter Vardar Macedonia and infiltrate the local Bulgarian administration, waiting for an opportunity to take over control and create a pro-German Macedonian state. Although Nazi Germany gave Bulgaria the right to annex the greater part of Vardar Macedonia, the Gestapo had contacts with Mihailov and his men in Bulgaria and Vardar Macedonia. This was in order to have a "reserve card" in case of things going wrong in Bulgaria.

Serbian Chetnik Movement in Macedonia – There were approximately 8,000 Serb Chetniks led by Draža Mihailović operating in Macedonia during the conflict. For a time, they were controlled by rival Chetnik leader Kosta Pećanac.

Counter-chetas – The Kontračeti were anti-partisan units organized and equipped by the Bulgarian police in the period between 1942 and 1944. Composed of former IMRO-activists, the first kontračeta was formed in Veles in the end of 1942 in order to limit partisan and Serbian Chetnik Movement activities in the region. The idea for the formation of these units came from Stefan Simeonov, chief of the Police in Skopje district, and former Internal Dobrujan Revolutionary Organisation četnik, and was approved by minister of the interior Petur Gabrovski. However, by 1942, the initial pro‑Bulgarian sentiment in the region had faded amid policies of "forcible Bulgarianisation" of the local population. Recruitment efforts attracted only about 200 people, and these units were soon defeated and dispersed by the Partisans.

== 1941 ==
=== Local resistance under question ===
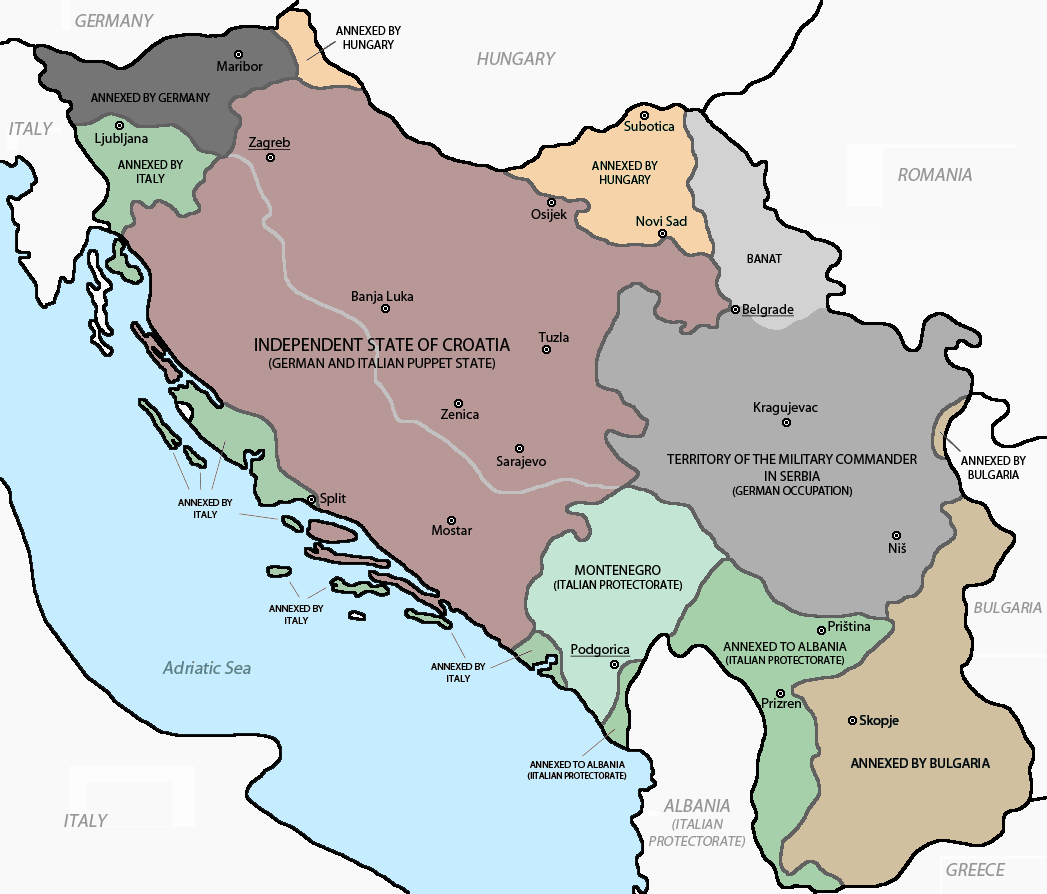
Occupation and partition of Kingdom of Yugoslavia in April 1941. Bulgaria occupied the central and eastern parts of Vardar Macedonia, while the westernmost part was occupied by the Kingdom of Italy.

In 1941 the Regional Committee of the Communists in Macedonia (RC) was headed by Metodi Shatorov ("Sharlo") from Prilep a former IMRO (United) member. After the Bulgarian takeover of Vardarska Banovina in April 1941, the Macedonian communists fell in the sphere of influence of the Bulgarian Communist Party (BCP) under Sharlo's leadership. Since 1924 the BCP had supported the idea of an independent and unified Macedonia and its inclusion into an imagined Balkan Federation. Contrary, the Communist Party of Yugoslavia (CPY) strictly aimed on preserving Yugoslavia and tended to neglect the idea of unification of Macedonia. When the directive for the organization of an armed resistance movement in all regions of occupied Yugoslavia was issued, Sharlo disobeyed the order. Sharlo answered the Central Committee (CC) of the CPY that the situation in Macedonia did not allow an immediate engagement with military action, but rather first propaganda activity should occur, and afterward formation of military units. On the other hand, he called for the incorporation of the local Macedonian Communist organizations into the Bulgarian Communist Party (BCP). The RC refused to remain in contact with CPY and linked up with BCP. While the Bulgarian Communists avoided organizing mass armed uprising against the Bulgarian authorities, the Yugoslav Communists insisted that no liberation could be achieved without an armed revolt. Also, Sharlo accepted the fact that much of the population was assenting towards the occupation. However, Sharlo's views were politically incorrect for the BCP leadership. The secretary of the Central Committee of BCP Traycho Kostov responded to Sharlo that the Macedonians were not at all enthusiastic about the Bulgarian occupation and that over 80 percent of the locals consider themselves Macedonians and not Bulgarians, especially younger generation who were not caught up in the Exarchist propaganda. Apparently the leaders of BCP were in a deadlock, they didn't want to return the region to Yugoslavia, but at the same time their call for a Balkan Federation and independent Macedonia was suspended by the Comintern and altered with the popular-front tactics.

=== First attempts ===
Because of this conflict within the RC, in Vardar Macedonia there was no resistance movement. At the start of World War II, the Comintern supported a policy of non-intervention, arguing that the war was an imperialist war between various national ruling classes, this changed after the Axis invasion of Soviet Union. The RC, headed by Shatorov, immediately ordered the formation of partisan units, the first of which was formed in the Skopje region on 22 August 1941, and attacked Bulgarian guards on 8 September 1941 in Bogomila, near Skopje. However, Sharlo adopted a stance in favour of a Soviet Macedonia and of waiting for the Red Army and was prominent with his anti-Serbian political views, thus got in a firm conflict with the CPY. At that time, with the help of the Comintern and of Joseph Stalin himself a decision was taken and the RC was reattached to the CPY. Soon after this Shatorov lost his popularity within the RC and was discredited.

People loyal to the CPY were next appointed as leaders of the RC with Lazar Koliševski as a secretary. He was sent in September in Skopje. The new leadership began formation of partisan detachments. Armed insurgents from the Prilep Partisan Detachment "Goce Delčev" attacked Axis occupied zones in the city of Prilep, notably a Bulgarian police station, on 11 October 1941. This date is considered to be the beginning of the Macedonian Uprising, which began at the latest compared to the other Yugoslav republics, where it began in July. The next day in the Kumanovo region, the Karadak and Kozjak partisan detachments were formed, they soon engaged in fighting with the Bulgarian police with most of the members ending up killed and arrested, after which they ceased to exist. The Prilep detachment was active until December 1941, when it split in three groups – the first in Skopje, the second in Tikves, and the third in Bitola. However, in November the new leader of the RC – Koliševski was arrested and sentenced to death by a Bulgarian military court. He wrote two appeals for clemency to Bulgarian Tsar and to Defense Minister. There he regrets the accomplishment, insisting on his Bulgarian origin. As result his death sentence was commuted to life imprisonment, and Koliševski was sent to a prison in Pleven, Bulgaria.

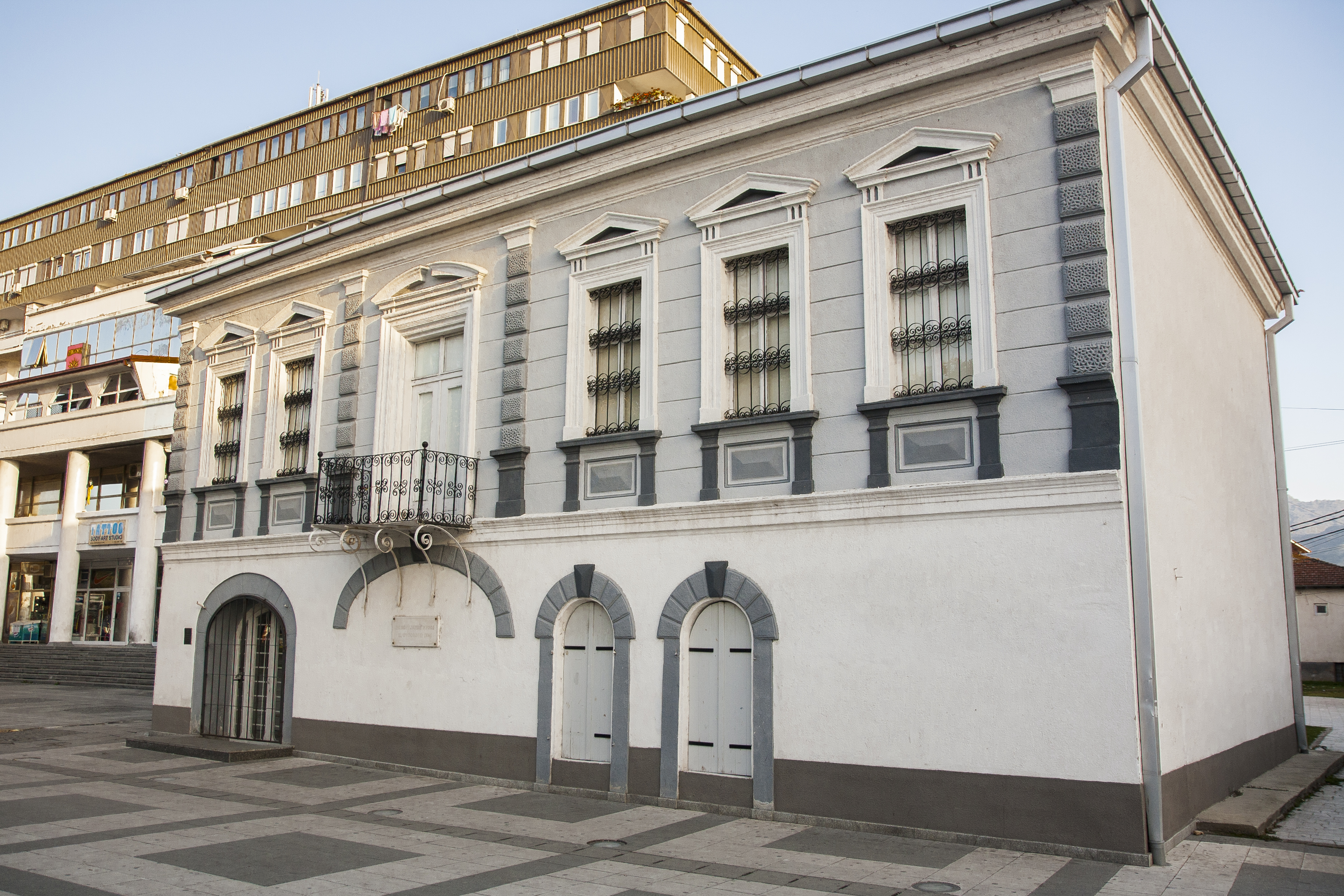
The former Bulgarian police station in Prilep was attacked by the Prilep Partisan Detachment on 11 October 1941. Today the object is memorial museum.

The military attaché of Independent State of Croatia, Adam Petrović in Sofia reported that the internal relations in Macedonia are not clear, and that Macedonians express dissatisfaction with the Bulgarian regime. They note that the locals in Macedonia had less rights than the Bulgarians in Bulgaria proper, and that in Macedonia exists a strong current for liberation and creation of Independent Macedonia.

=== Bulgarian actions in 1941 ===
After establishing themselves as the new rulers, the Bulgarian regime started a process of Bulgarisation, since only a portion of the population felt Bulgarian or was pro-Bulgarian. Any kind of claim of cultural or linguistic distinctiveness among Macedonians was prohibited. In order to enforce the Bulgarisation campaign in all spheres of life, Bulgarians from Bulgaria proper were brought in for specific functions. They would serve as the main force of the campaign through the military, civil, judicial, and police administration. Also, the people brought were corrupt and incompetent since they were castoffs from other governmental agencies.

On top of all the Bulgarian regime gave high importance to education as a mean for the Bulgarisation campaign. For this reason many schools from elementary to university level were open to serve as tool to instil in young Macedonians a Bulgarian identity. Again for this work primarily teachers from Bulgaria proper were assigned, which in the 1941-42 school year numbered 1,508 out of total 2,035 teachers in occupied Macedonia. Meanwhile those local Macedonian teachers who were considered convenient were sent to Bulgaria proper for a year of study and indoctrination. On the other hand those who were deemed inconvenient were assigned to administrative jobs outside the school system or were simply dismissed. The new curriculum in the schools heavily stressed Bulgarian topics and discouraged the use of the Macedonian dialects, which were regarded as a Bulgarian dialects. A regular weekly school schedule involved seven hours of Bulgarian language, three hours of Bulgarian history, and one hour of Bulgarian church history. In comparison other subjects included three hours of each mathematics and modern language and one hour for Russian language (applicable for grades five and six only).

The Bulgarian regime strived to use the mass media for propaganda and also organized and funded youth organizations inspired by fascist ideas. Furthermore, the Bulgarian Orthodox Church took control over the local churches and the Serbian clergy was replaced with priests from Bulgaria proper. A church commission was assigned to remove all traces of non-Bulgarian culture.

The director of Skopje district, Anton Kozarov, noticed uncomfortable behavior from the Bulgarian authorities over the non-Bulgarian population. He sent a letter to all the heads in Macedonia instructing them to soften the behavior, especially against using the insults "Macedonian mother" or "Serbian mother". His goal was "spiritual equality over the new borders of Bulgaria".

== 1942 ==
=== Local resistance schism ===
While the Sharlo's leadership was terminated, the vestiges of his policy among part of the local communist activists were preserved. After the arrest of Lazar Koliševski in November, the new executive body of the RC shared Shatorov's views and close contact was re-established with the BCP. As a result, the factionalist struggle between the pro-Bulgarian and the pro-Yugoslav Macedonians continued. At that moment the BCP considered that armed resistance was hopeless against the numerous Bulgarian occupation forces, and that those operating in the mountains just make it more simple for the authorities to catch them. Furthermore, they considered that more damage to the regime can be done with revolutionary agitation at first and armed confrontation can begin when enough strength is gathered for it to be successful. The BCP had a representative in the RC, that was Boyan Balgaranov, who contrary to the CPY's stance of maintaining Yugoslavia, supported the idea of independent and unified Macedonia. Furthermore, the BCP insisted a Macedonian Communist Party to be formed, in order to keep their influence in the region. It is likely that Bane Andreev, the new party secretary for Macedonia, was under influence of Balgaranov. During Andreev's leadership the RC urged for a fight for free Macedonia against the fascist Bulgarian government and monarch but not for a new Yugoslavia. Moreover, Andreev avoided references to Yugoslavia and favored to sign declarations on behalf of "group of Macedonians" or "honest Macedonians", and suchlike. He thought that the Macedonian people believe in Bulgaria's role as liberator and that no Macedonian wants to fight against the Bulgarian soldiers. That the Macedonians should respond positively to the mobilization call being carried out by the Bulgarian authorities and join the Bulgarian army. Tito did not agree with that. During the spring of 1942, Andreev was arrested by the Bulgarian police.

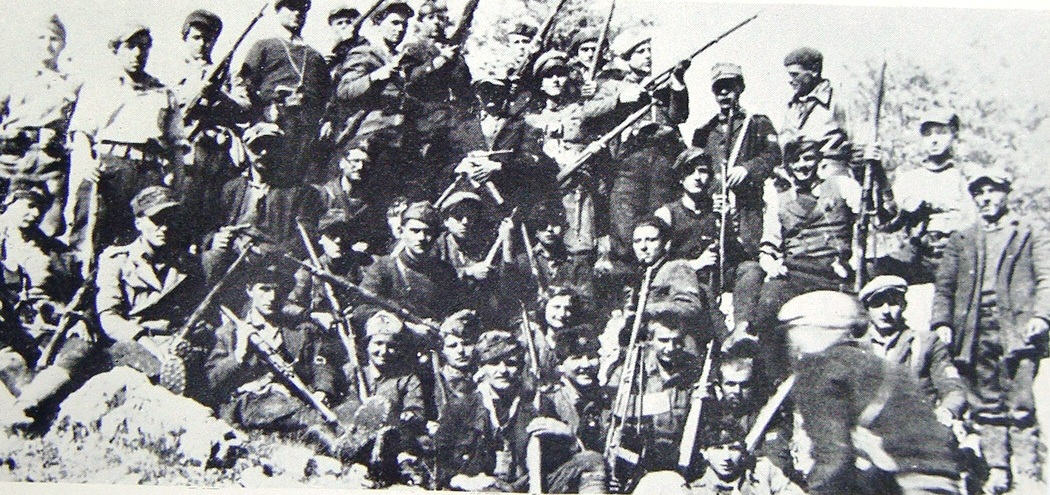
Formation of the partisan detachment "Dame Gruev", June 6, 1942, near the village of Zlatari, Prespa.

In September 1942 the envoy of the CC of CPY Dobrivoje Radosavljević succeed in forming a new Regional Committee loyal to the Yugoslav line under the leadership of Kuzman Josifovski Pitu. However, under Pitu's leadership the RC again avoided alluding to Yugoslavia, also they proclaimed to be the "Regional Committee of Communist Party of Macedonia" although such party didn't exist at that moment. Radosavljevic explained to the CPY leaders that Macedonians (except for those in parts of northern Macedonia who were pro-Serbian) were very afraid of a reintegration in Yugoslavia, even though they "already" despised the "Greater Bulgarian hegemonists" as well. Thus Radosavljevic suggested focusing the local communist propaganda towards historical references and traditional slogans like the "unification of Macedonia" to gain support from the population. Although the slogan "unified Macedonia" was not approved by Tito's headquarters or by Moscow. At the same time Macedonian communists more and more specifically stated to be genuine inheritors and promoters of centuries-old traditions of Macedonians, manifested by figures such Cyril and Methodius, and tied their cause through historical continuity with the Macedonian revolutionary movement.

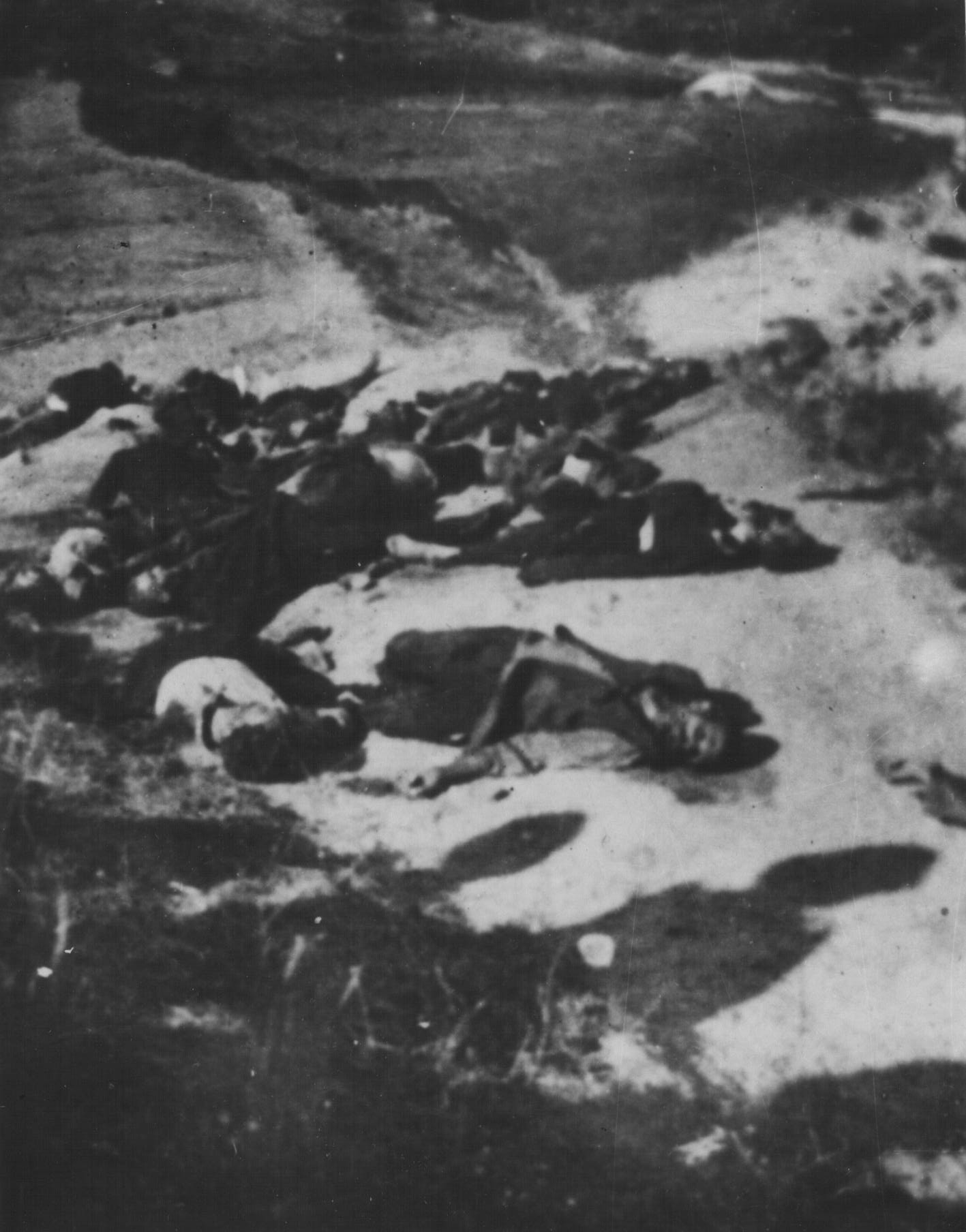
In September 1942 the Bulgarian authorities, after they brutally tortured them for several days, killed 11 civilians near the village of Dabnica, the victims were accused of being involved in the partisan movement.

=== Bulgarian actions in 1942 ===
The Bulgarian regime created a special gendarmerie force which received almost unlimited power to pursue the Communist partisans in the whole kingdom. Many former right-wing IMRO members were involved in the so-called counter-chetas which assisted the gendarmerie in fighting the partisans.

On 10 June 1942, the National Assembly imposed Bulgarian citizenship in all "Newly-liberated lands", on all of the population of "Bulgarian" origin. Otherwise, refusing citizenship meant to leave the country, and if so without any financial goods, since all of the bank accounts in the occupied territories would be frozen. Meanwhile, those who would acquire Bulgarian citizenship were promised exclusion from all taxes and levies.

Although the Bulgarians enacted a set of tax relief and financial aid laws in the "new lands", and established 800 new schools in Macedonia, also a library, museum and national theater in Skopje, none of it provided any sizeable sympathy. These endowments were seen as proof of the Bulgarisation campaign by Macedonians. A particular hostility by dissident Macedonians was espoused towards the use of Bulgarian language in schools. In the following years, because of the degree of resistance, in many areas attendance was retained by force, and some schools were closed.

Despite all of the efforts of the Bulgarian authorities, the great majority of the population which consisted of those who felt themselves Macedonians opposed or remained passive towards the Bulgarisation and other oppressive policies. The school inspector in Bitola region, Kosta Tsarnushanov, reported that the police officers and soldiers were very harsh towards the population, beating until exhaustion and insulting the locals with words such as "your filthy Macedonian mother". As a matter of fact all of the previous confirmed to the Macedonians that the Bulgarian oppressive regime was the same as the Yugoslav (Serbian) before. The same policy was shared, of denying the nationality, language, political autonomy of the Macedonians and their free development into a national unit. Consequently, in the same time autonomist feelings were growing and the support for the Communist partisans was becoming larger.

== 1943 ==
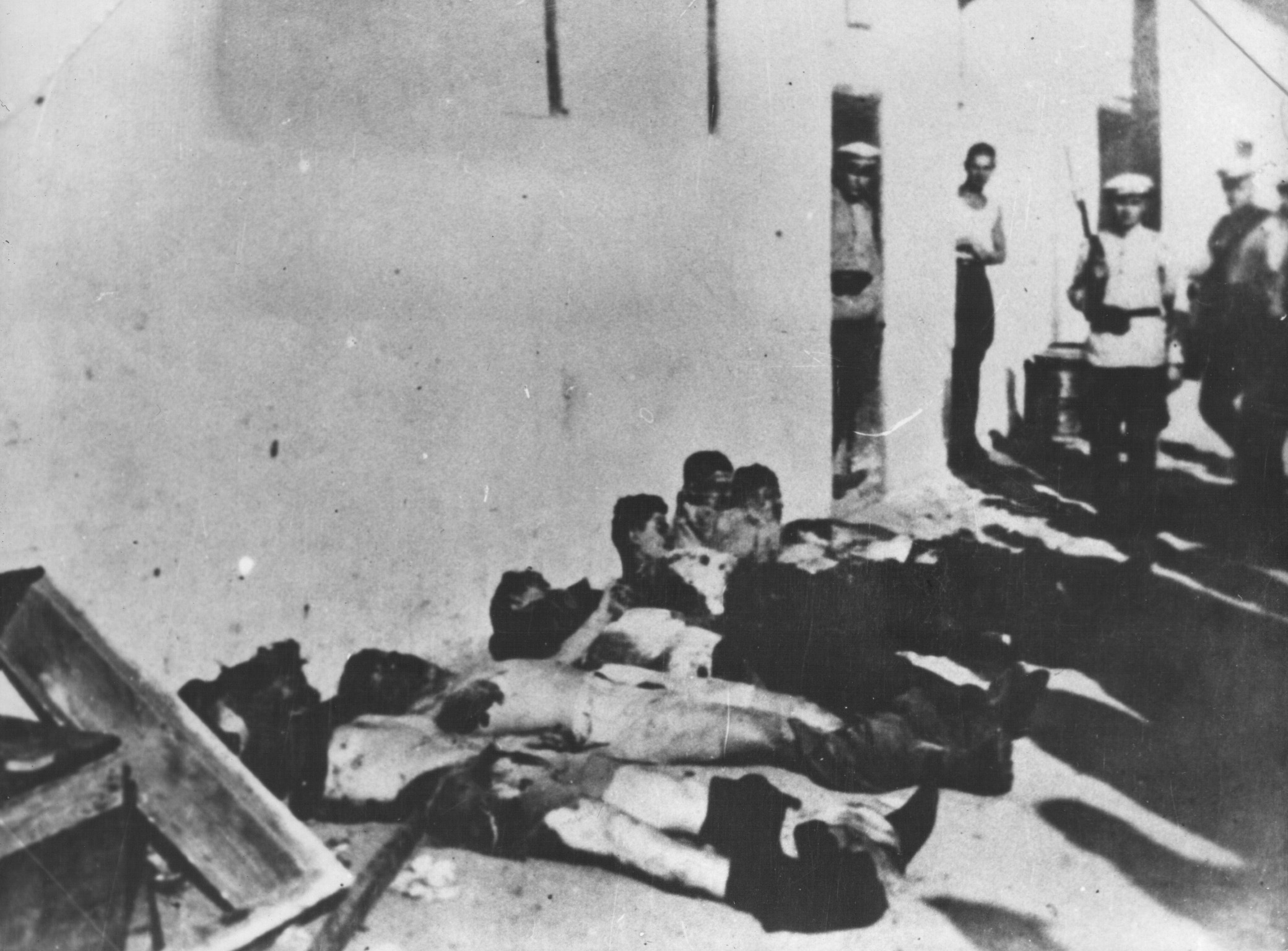
Killed partisans exhibited on the streets of Prilep in 1943.

=== Support from the CC of the CPY ===
The resentment against the occupying forces was growing and several revolts arose in 1942 which led to temporary liberation of some areas. However, most Macedonian Communists had yet to be lured to the idea of Yugoslavia. Between 1941 and 1943, Tito have sent five emissaries to Macedonia, to persuade his ill-disciplined comrades, but their efforts had limited success, and the Regional Committee was de facto under the control of the BCP. To change that, at the beginning of 1943 the Montenegrin Svetozar Vukmanović-Tempo was sent as an assistant to the HQ of the Macedonian partisan forces. Tempo was supposed to organize an energetic struggle against the occupying forces and to set up a Macedonian Communist Party within the framework of the Yugoslav one. According to the CPY's plan, this structure would be active only in Vardar Macedonia and would include only activists loyal to the Yugoslav agenda. Facing the questions of the unification of Macedonia, often addressed by activists with more autonomist attitude in relation to the Yugoslav project, the CPY leaders proclaimed that the different parts of Macedonia (Yugoslav, Greek and Bulgarian) would be joined within Yugoslavia as extension of its prewar territory. Hence, Tempo was assigned with the task of contacting the Greek Communists and the novice Albanian Communists, also of aiding the latter.

=== Formation of the Communist Party of Macedonia (CPM) ===
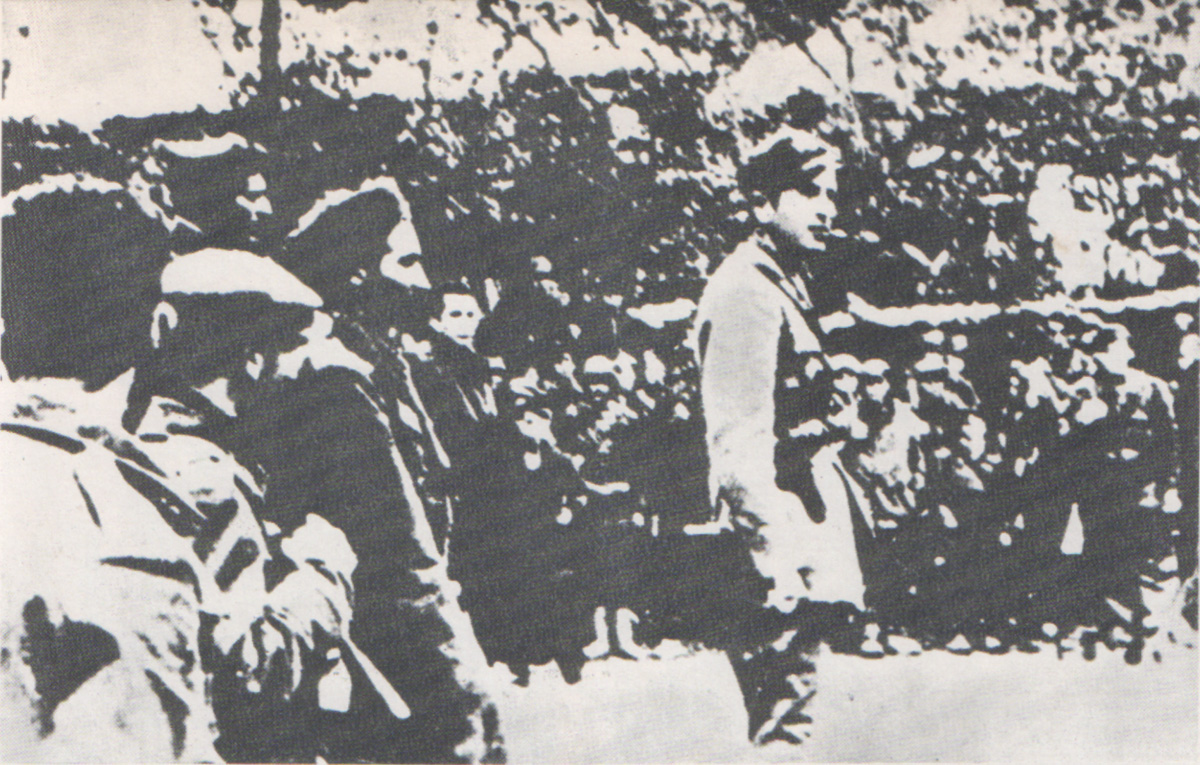
Svetozar Vukmanović welcomes Macedonian and Greek Partisans in the Karadjova Valley (Greece) in 1943. Under his leadership, the pro-Bulgarian Regional Committee of the communists in Macedonia was disbanded and they were bound up with the Yugoslav communists.

The Regional Committee was disbanded and a separate Macedonian Communist Party was established, which would be representative of the will of the Macedonian people in the anti-fascist struggle for national liberation. The Communist Party of Macedonia (CPM) was formed on 19 March 1943 in Tetovo. The first Central Committee (CC of the CPM) was composed of Strahil Gigov, Kuzman Josifovski Pitu, Cvetko Uzunovski, Mara Naceva, Lazar Koliševski and Bane Andreev.

After making a detailed analysis of the military and political situation in the country, the CC of the CPM decided to be directly involved in the fighting and to be stationed side by side with the troops on the battlefield. The territory of Vardar Macedonia was divided into five operative zones, and efforts were made to make direct contact with the liberation movements in Albania, Bulgaria and Greece.

Adding to the existing eleven, eight new Macedonian partisan detachments were formed in the summer of 1943 as more and more people entered the ranks of the partisans. They managed to create strongholds in the regions of Debarca, Prespa, Kumanovo, Tikvesh, and Gevgelija. This allowed for the expansion of the National Liberation Committees and the creation of larger military units, as decided at a conference in Prespa on 2 August 1943. Regular large military units (battalions and brigades) were created as part of the People's Liberation Army of Macedonia (NOVM).

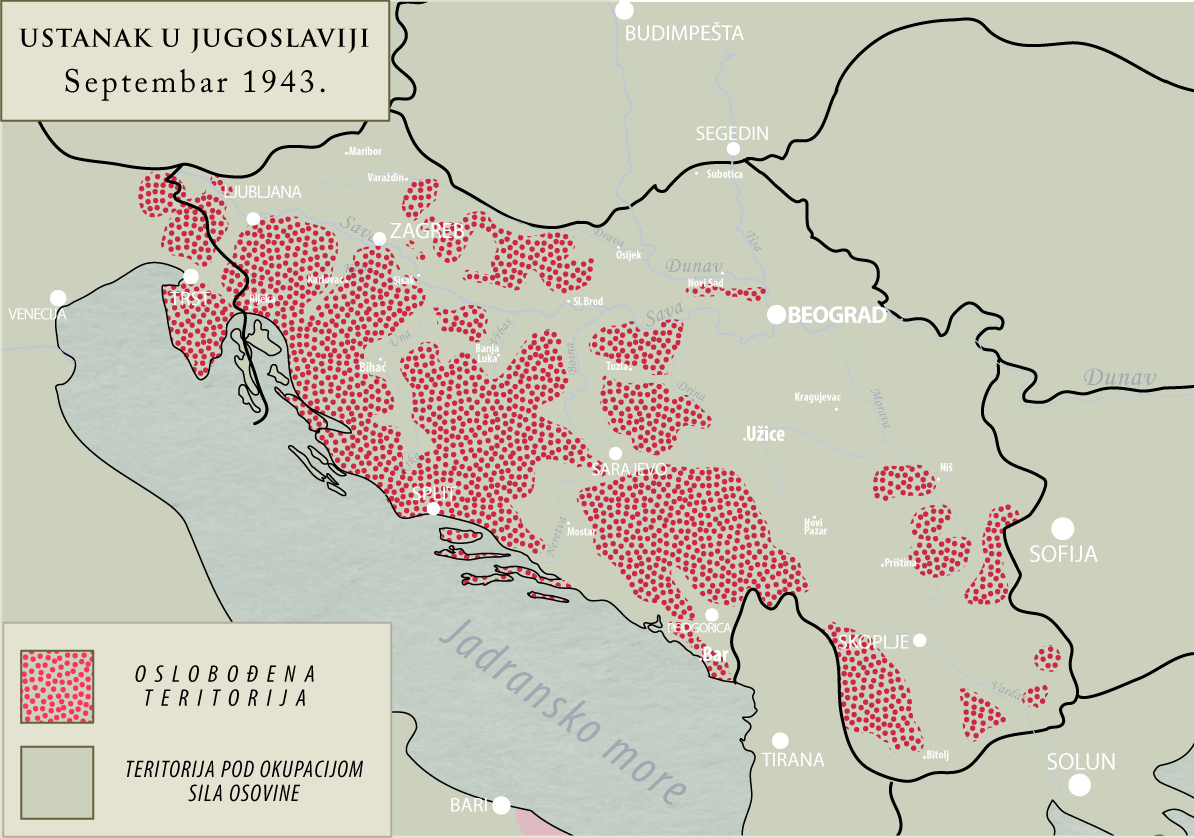
Resistance in Yugoslavia after the capitulation of Italy, September 1943.

=== Formation of the People's Liberation Army of Macedonia ===
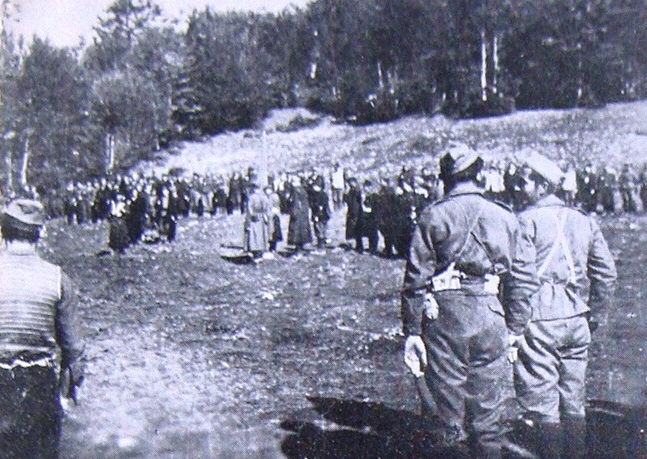
Forming of the battalion "Mirče Acev".

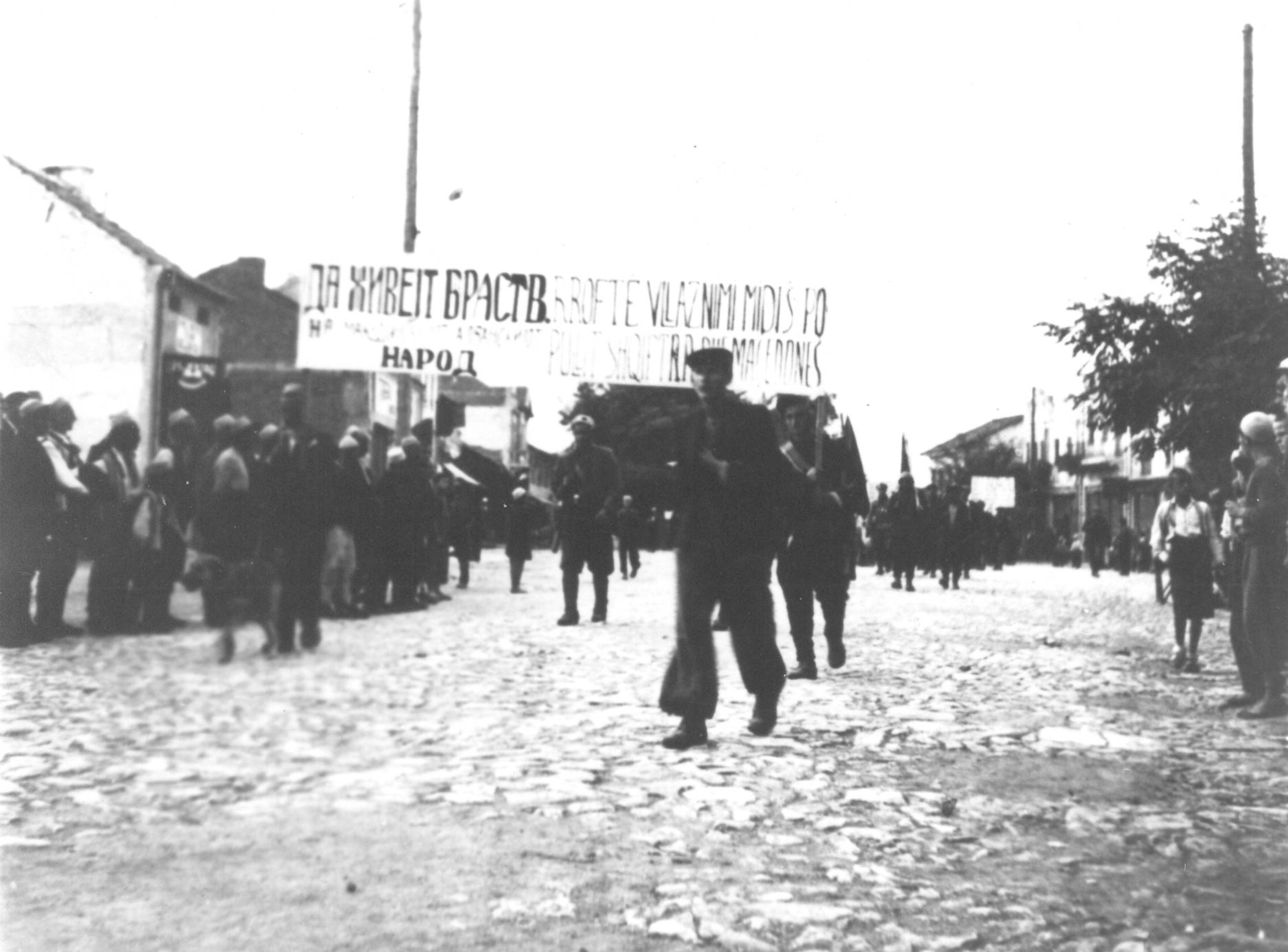
Albanian and Macedonian Partisans of the battalion "Mirče Acev" in Kičevo, 11 September 1943 marching with a transparent. It reads: "Long live the fraternity of the Macedonian and Albanian people!"

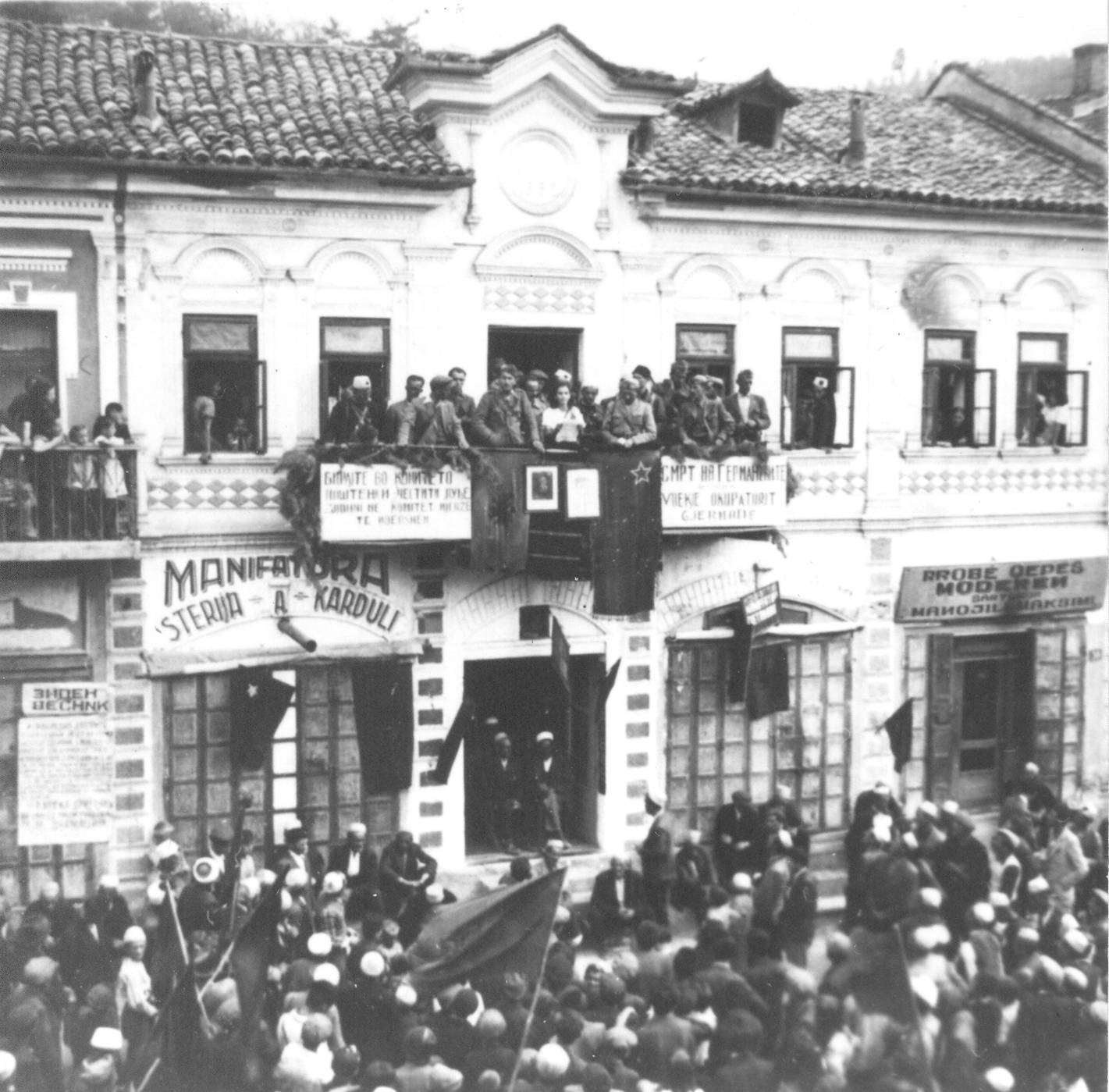
Public rally in Kičevo in the Albanian zone on 26 September 1943, after a significant revolt occurred in the area and a Soviet Macedonian republic was proclaimed. It was soon overwhelmed by the Bulgarian forces.

The date of the creation of its first major unit, the "Mirče Acev" battalion was August 18, 1943 on Mount Slavej between Ohrid and Kičevo, then in the Italian occupation zone. It was formed from the fighters of the partisan detachment Dame Gruev and part of the detachments Dimitar Vlahov and Gjorche Petrov. In the middle of 1943, meetings were held between representatives of the Greek resistance and the Albanian resistance. Svetozar Vukmanović put forward the idea of a joint Balkan Headquarters to exercise supreme control over the partisan movements in Yugoslavia, Albania, Bulgaria, and Greece. Although this idea failed he managed to "export" the Macedonian liberation movement. Tempo asked for recognition of the ethnic Macedonian people's right to self-determination, and permission from ELAS for the partisans from Vardar Macedonia to extend their activity among the Slavic-speaking population in Greek Macedonia. As a result, the Slavic-Macedonian National Liberation Front (SNOF) was established in 1943 in Greek Macedonia by ethnic Macedonian communists, members of the Communist Party of Greece (KKE). After passing through western Greek Macedonia, the main forces of the People's Liberation Army of Macedonia were stationed in the Almopia region in Greece close to the Yugoslav border. The Partisan detachments that were active in the Gevgelija region and Tikvesh also crossed the border into northern Greece and met with the main forces of the NOVM. Several meetings were held with members of ELAS and the KKE. One of the decisions was the creation of wider partisan detachments composed of the ethnic Macedonian minority in Greece. On 11 November 1943, the 1st Macedonian-Kosovo Assault Brigade was formed in western Macedonia by merging two Vardar Macedonian and one Kosovo battalion. The second larger military unit was the 2nd Macedonian Assault Brigade, formed on 20 December 1943 just across the border in Greek Macedonia. It was formed in village of Fustani in the Pella district, out of the 3 battalions of the 3rd operative zone. The Hristo Botev partisan battalion of the NOVM was formed out of deserted Bulgarian soldiers, it was included in the 2nd Macedonian Assault Brigade. On 26 February 1944 in the village of Zegljane, near Kumanovo, the 3rd Macedonian Assault Brigade was formed from the battalions Stiv Naumov, Jordan Nikolov-Orce and Hristijan Todorovski-Karpoš. These three brigades were the nucleus of the National Liberation Army of Macedonia, which after constant battles became stronger in numbers. The rest of the fighters that were not included in the First Macedonian-Kosovo Assault Brigade and the Second Macedonian Assault Brigade (the Hristo Botev and Strašo Pindžur battalion and the detachments from Gevgelija and Tikvesh) were organized into the so-called "Third Group of Battalions".

=== Bulgarian actions in 1943 ===
Bulgaria managed to save its entire 48,000-strong Jewish population during World War II from deportation to Nazi concentration camps, but under German pressure those Jews from their newly annexed territories without Bulgarian citizenship were deported, such as those from Vardar Macedonia and Western Thrace. The Bulgarian government was responsible for the roundup and deportation of over 7,000 Jews in Skopje and Bitola.

Around this time Ivan Mihailov of IMRO had plans which envisaged the creation of a Macedonian state under German control. He was a follower of the idea of a united Macedonian state with a dominant Bulgarian element. On 16 June 1943, the Bulgarian forces committed the massacre of Vataša, in which 12 young civilians were shot: Pero Videv (15 years old), Danko Davkov (18), Ilija Dimov (18), Risto Gjondev (18), Gerasim Matakov (18), Pane Dzunov (18), Pane Meshkov (18), Vancho Gjurev (19), Blazhe Icev (20), Dime Chekorov (20), Fercho Popgjorjiev (26) and Vasil Hadziyordanov (28). They were suspected of becoming guerillas in the coming days.

== 1944 and aftermath ==
=== February Campaign ===
The February march campaign of 1944 had a great political and moral impact. The whole Bulgarian 5th Army, all of the Bulgarian police, as well as the army regiments stationed in Kjustendil and Gorna Dzumaja were engaged in the battles. After the February march, the Bulgarian government was forced to change its strategy – organization of the fighting would no longer be the responsibility of the police but of the army, and all organizations would be obliged to help the army.

=== Destruction of the Vardar Chetnik Corps ===
At the end of January 1944, the High Command of the NOVM decided to launch an offensive, with the intention of destroying the VCC. On 29 February 1944 the partisans of the Third Macedonian Assault Brigade attacked the Chetnik flanks from north, west and south, while the Hristo Botev detachment hit the Chetniks from the east. In the battle for the village of Sejac, the Vardar Chetnik Corps was totally destroyed, suffering 53 casualties (46 shot by partisans and 7 drowned in the river Pčinja while attempting to flee). 97 Chetniks, including 5 officers, were captured in the action. On 3 March 1944 in the village of Novo Selo, Partisan fighters destroyed the remaining force, capturing 30 Chetniks and more than 100 rifles and ammunition. Various local Chetnik bands, decentralized and acting on their own accord, such as the Porech Chetniks, continued to operate in certain parts of Macedonia but they were generally scattered and disorganized.

=== Actions in northern Vardar Macedonia and south-eastern Serbia ===
After the operations which ended with the destruction of the Chetniks in Macedonia, the HQ of the NOVM, now acting as supreme commander of the partisan units in Vardar Macedonia, Kosovo and South Morava, decided to engage in three new attacks on the Bulgarian police and administration. On 26 April 1944 the Third Macedonian Assault Brigade together with the Kosovo detachment successfully attacked the city of Ristovac, where 130 Bulgarian soldiers were killed and 20 captured by the Macedonian partisans. On 3 April 1944 the 3rd Macedonian Assault Brigade attacked the mining town of Zletovo, where about 100 miners entered the ranks of the brigade.

=== Spring Offensive ===
Because of increased partisan activity, the main supply lines for the German Army group "E" stationed in Greece and Albania were constantly ambushed and at the same time, the HQ of the MNOV was making plans to liberate western Macedonia and sent the 1st Macedonian-Kosovo Assault Brigade there. Pushing towards Debarca, the 1st Macedonian-Kosovo Assault Brigade had clashes with the Bulgarians and Germans in Zavoj and Velmej. The Germans obtained reinforcements and on 8 May 1944 they counter-attacked. The fighting ended on 20 May 1944 with the Germans being pushed out of the region. After recapturing the Debarca area, more reinforcements became available, so the brigade was split in two brigades – the 1st Macedonian and 1st Kosovo Assault Brigades. In order to prevent the Germans and Bulgarians from taking total control of the action, the NOVM decided to make surprise attacks on enemy positions and to try to exhaust the enemy any way they could. The 2nd Macedonian Assault Brigade was sent to conduct several actions in Povardarie (central Macedonia) and Pelagonia near Prilep and Bitola.

=== ASNOM ===
On 2 August 1944, on the 41st anniversary of the Ilinden Uprising, the first session of the newly created Anti-Fascist Assembly of the National Liberation of Macedonia (ASNOM) was held in the Prohor Pčinjski Monastery, on which a Macedonian state was proclaimed under the name Democratic Federal Macedonia.

А manifesto was issued outlining the future plans of ASNOM for unification of the whole Macedonian people and declaring the Macedonian language as the official language of Macedonia.

In spite of Tito's hopes to the contrary, the presiding committee of ASNOM was dominated by elements that were not known for their pro-Yugoslav sentiments. To the displeasure of those preferring joining the Yugoslav Socialist Federation, Metodija Andonov-Čento was elected president and Panko Brashnarov (former member of IMRO) vice-president. The assembly tried to secure as much independence as possible for Yugoslav Macedonia and gave priority to the unification of the three parts of Macedonia. Several sources state that Čento had made plans for creating an independent Macedonia which would be backed by the US.

ASNOM was the governing body of Macedonia from its formation until April 1945.

=== "Maximalists" and "Minimalists" ===
The Manifesto of ASNOM eventually became a compromise between the "maximalists" and the "minimalists" – the unification of the Macedonian people was discussed and propagandized but the decision was ultimately reached that Vardar Macedonia would become a part of the new Communist Yugoslavia.

The proponents of the "maximalist" line were in favor of the creation of an independent United Macedonian state which would have ties with Yugoslavia, but not necessarily inclusion in a Yugoslav Federation. Proponents of this option included Metodija Andonov-Čento, as well as prominent figures of the former IMRO (United) such as Pavel Shatev, Panko Brashnarov, and others. They saw joining Yugoslavia as a form of Serbian dominance over Macedonia, and preferred membership in a Balkan Federation or else complete independence. Proponents of the "minimalist" line were also for the creation of a Macedonian state, but within the Yugoslavian federation.

These differences were visible in the ASNOM discussions, but they especially came into the open after the final liberation of Macedonia. It must be added that both "maximalist" and "minimalist" lines within the National Liberation Movement in Vardar Macedonia supported the existence of a separate Macedonian identity and were in favor of the creation of a separate state in which the Macedonian people would have their homeland. The greatest difference between the two lines was whether Macedonia should join Yugoslavia, or exist as an independent country.

=== Failed attempt to create Macedonian puppet state ===
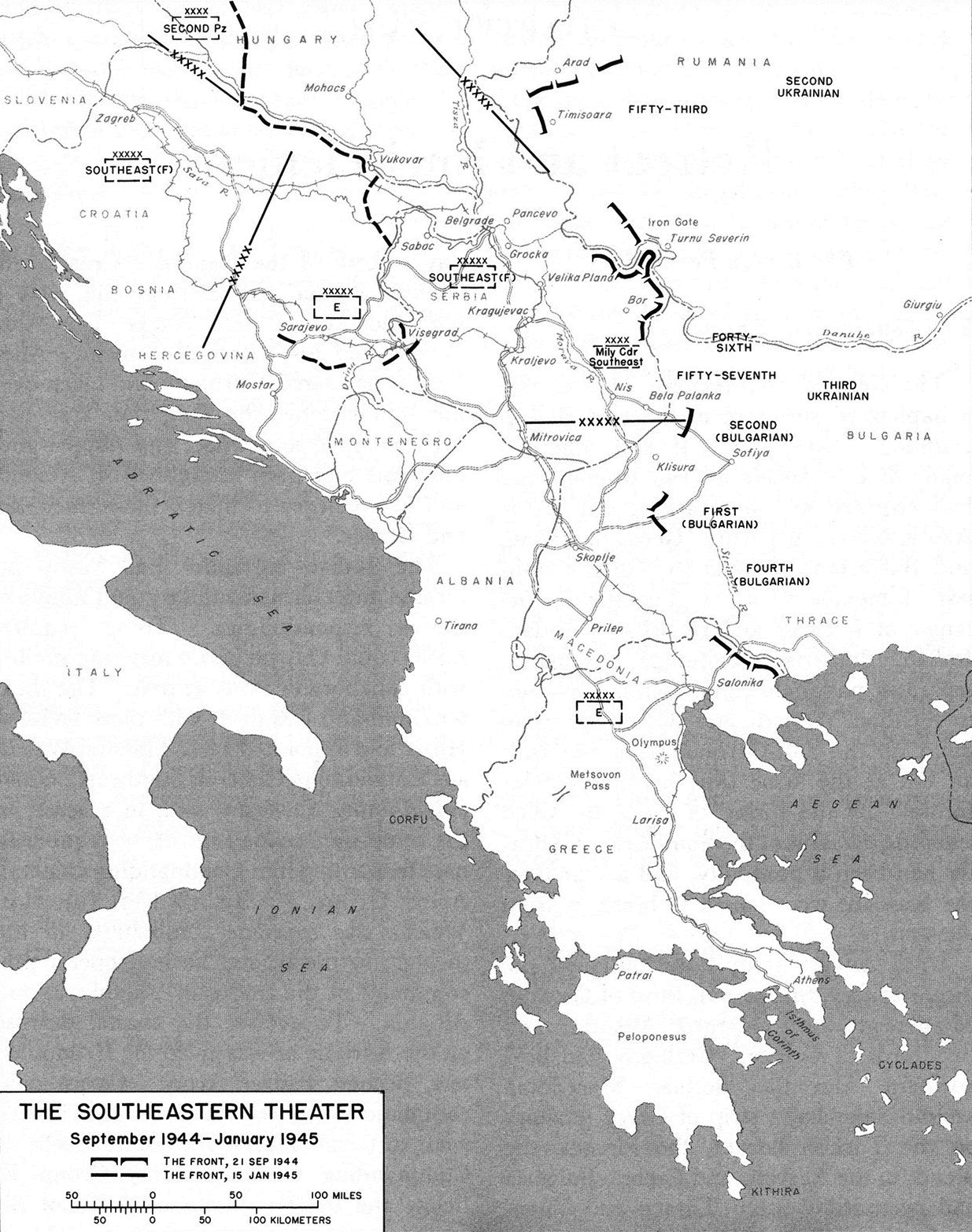
Map of the Balkan military theater during September 1944 – January 1945.

By August 1944, the Soviet Army was approaching the Balkans. In a last-minute attempt to create a buffer state against the incoming Red Army, on 29 August, the Germans attempted to establish an 'independent' Macedonian puppet state, led by Ivan Mihailov. Unlike the leftist resistance, the right wing followers of IMRO were pro-Bulgarian orientated, and did not support the existence of a future Yugoslavia. The Bulgarian interior minister was put in charge to contact Mihajlov, who at the time was an advisor to Croatia's Nazi leader Ante Pavelić. The state was to receive no military (troops or weapons) backing from Germany, because the Germans were running short on troops and weapons. Telegrams from the time indicate that an orderly Bulgarian-German troop withdrawal would precede the formation of such a puppet state. Bulgaria ordered its troops to withdraw from Macedonia on 2 September. In the evening on 3 September, Ivan Mihailov was flown in first from Zagreb to Sofia, to see what 'can be saved". Two telegrams from 5 September at 1:7 and 6 September at 2:20 relay Hitler's reorder for the establishment of such a state. Mihajlov was transported from Sofia to Skopje in the evening of 5 September. Based on German telegrams from the time, Ivan Mihailov was offered the establishment of such a state, but by 18:00 (6 pm) on 6 September, he declined for inability to gather support. The failure led to ordering German withdrawal from Greece on 6 September and appointing Senior-Field-Commandant for Greece Heinz Scheeuerlen as the new Senior-Field-Commandant for Macedonia. Germany closed its Consulate in Skopje and evacuated its staff together with Ivan Mihailov and his wife out of Macedonia. However, on 8 September, right-wing IMRO nationalists declared independence. The self-proclaimed state was left "virtually defenseless" following the withdrawal of German troops. The Germans did not support it as their forces withdrew from the region. In the chaos, they just tried to use the new-formed "Macedonian committees" as local police stations. Their members were former activists of Bulgarian Action Committees.

=== Bulgaria switching sides ===
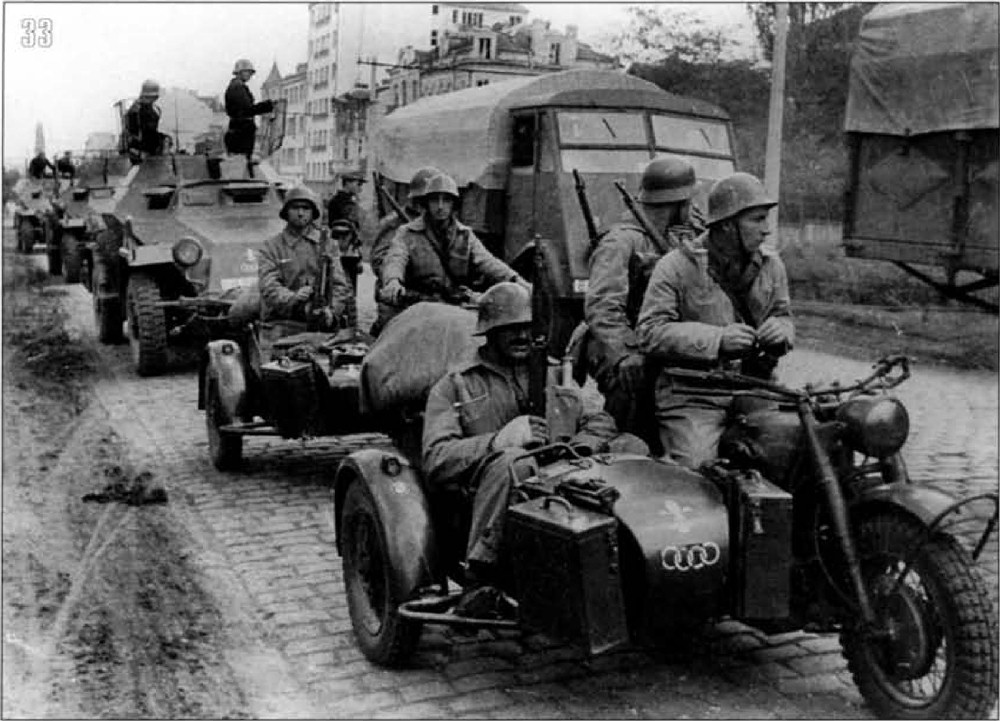
Bulgarian troops reentering Yugoslavia in October 1944.

In September 1944 the Soviet Union declared war on Bulgaria and occupied part of the country. A coup d'état on 9 September led to Bulgaria joining the Soviets. A day earlier Bulgaria had declared war on Nazi Germany. This turn of events put Bulgarian divisions stationed in Macedonia in a difficult situation. German troops had closed round them, while their command was being nonplussed by the high treason of some staff officers, who had deserted to the German side. The withdrawing Bulgarian troops in Macedonia fought their way back to the old borders of Bulgaria. Josip Broz formed relations with the new pro-Communist authorities in Bulgaria. After Bulgaria switching sides to the Allies negotiations between Tito and the Bulgarian Communist leaders were organized in September–October 1944, resulting in a military alliance between the Yugoslav forces and Bulgaria. That was followed by demobilization of the Macedonian recruits, who formed as much as 40–60% of the soldiers in some Bulgarian battalions. As a result, the Gotse Delchev brigade was set up and equipped in Sofia by the Bulgarian government providing the basis for the deployment of considerable Yugoslav troops in Vardar Macedonia.

=== Final operations for the liberation of Macedonia ===
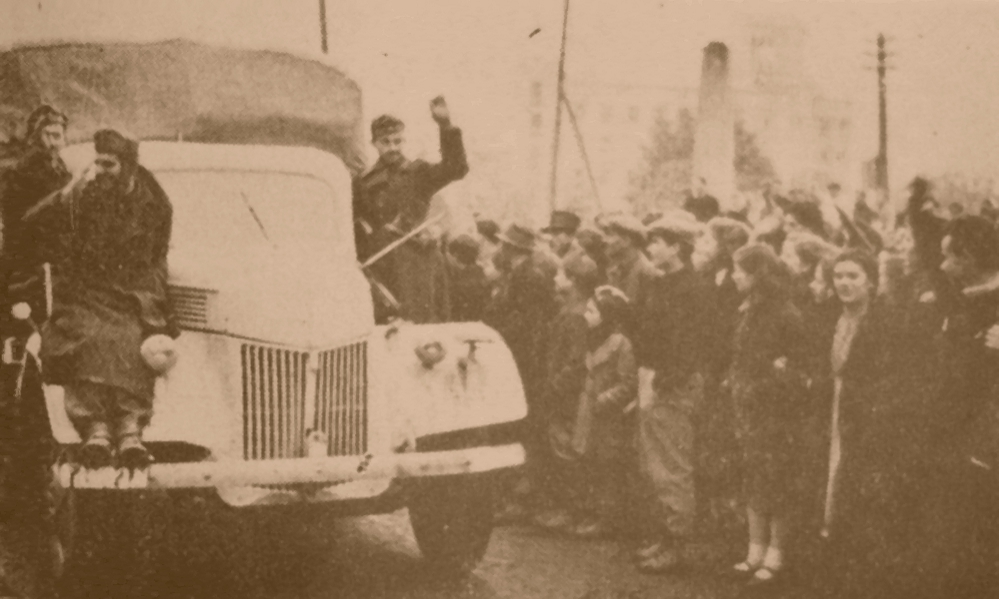
The main Bulgarian forces entering Skopje on 14 November. First Bulgarian units entered the city on November 13.

==== Bulgarian Army ====
Under the leadership of the new Bulgarian pro-Soviet government, four Bulgarian armies, 455,000 strong in total, were mobilized and reorganized. By the end of September, the Red Army 3rd Ukrainian Front troops were concentrated at the Bulgarian-Yugoslav border. In the early October 1944 three Bulgarian armies, consisting of around 340,000-man, together with the Red Army reentered occupied Yugoslavia and moved from Sofia to Niš, Skopje and Pristina to blocking the German forces withdrawing from Greece. In Macedonia the Bulgarians operated in conjunction with the fighters of the NOVM, but this cooperation did not proceed without difficulties. The German Brigade Angermiler was positioned at the Kačanik Gorge. Skopje was defended by elements of the 22nd Infantry Division and parts of the 11th Luftwaffe Division (which was mainly involved in the fighting in eastern Macedonia), and units from other divisions. From 8 October to 19 November, the Stratsin-Kumanovo operation was held and Kratovo, Kriva Palanka, Kumanovo and Skopje were taken. At the same time the Bregalnitsa-Strumica operation was led, and the Wehrmacht was driven from the villages of Delchevo, Kočani, Stip, Strumica and Veles. In parallel, the Kosovo operation was also taking a place, aiming to expel the German forces from Kosovo. Southern and Eastern Serbia, Kosovo and Vardar Macedonia were liberated by the end of November. The 3rd Ukrainian Front in collaboration with the People's Liberation Army of Yugoslavia and Bulgarian People's Army carried out the Belgrade Offensive. The 130,000-strong Bulgarian First Army continued to Hungary, driving off the Germans, while the rest moved back to Bulgaria. On a series of maps from Army Group E, showing its withdrawal through Macedonia and Southern Serbia, as well as in the memoirs of its chief of staff, there is almost no indication of Yugoslav Partisan units, but only Bulgarian divisions. In October 1944, 25 Bulgarian soldiers captured by the Germans managed to escape and hid in the city of Ohrid. Despite threats that the city would come under artillery fire from the Germans, the soldiers were not handed over by the citizens. Subsequently, the Germans set a condition for a ransom of 12 kg. gold. To accomplish this, even a gold cross was removed from the roof of a local church. Strongly impressed by this act, the Germans refused to take the gold and to look for the fugitives further and left the city. Thus the soldiers were saved.

==== Macedonian partisans ====
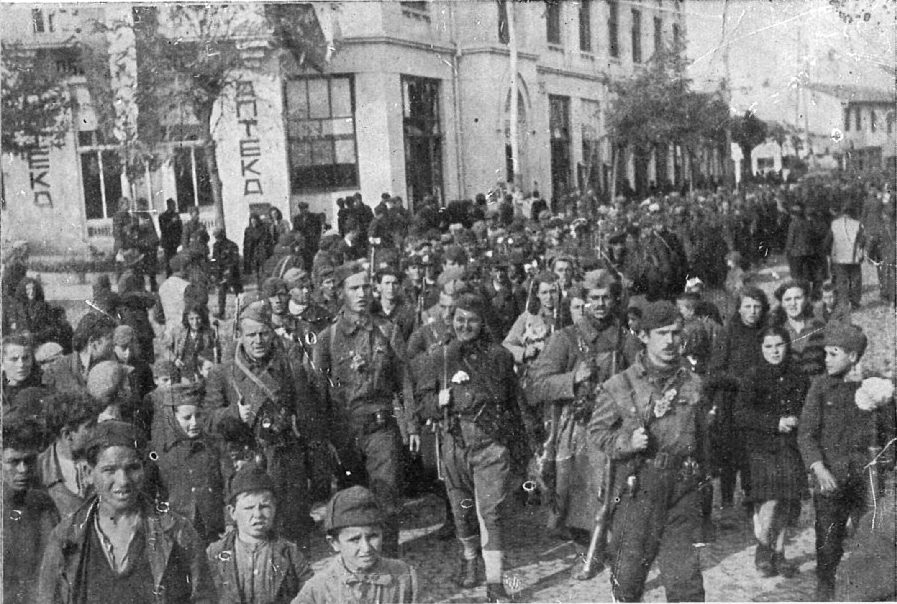
Macedonian partisans marching through liberated Kumanovo on November 11.

After the German retreat, forced by the Soviet-Bulgarian offensive in Serbia, North Macedonia and Kosovo in the autumn of 1944, the conscription increased significantly. In October 1944 more new brigades were formed. By the end of October 1944 in Vardar Macedonia there were 21 Macedonian, one Kosovar, one Albanian, and the 1st Aegean Macedonian brigade (composed of 1500 armed former Slavic-Macedonian National Liberation Front (SNOF) members that crossed the border into Vardar Macedonia after ELAS ordered the dissolution of their unit). The 1st Macedonian Cavalry Brigade and the 1st Macedonian Automobile Brigade were formed using captured equipment, arms, vehicles, and horses. From August until the beginning of November three Engineering Brigades were formed which started repairing the roads. The new brigades were grouped in six new divisions, which made the total force of the People's Liberation Army of Macedonia three Corps composed of seven divisions, consisting of some 66,000 Macedonian Partisans. By mid-November 1944 the Germans were completely dislodged from Macedonia, and organs of "People's Authority" were established. After the liberation of Macedonia the XV Macedonian corps were sent on the Syrmian Front with a personnel of 25,000 fighters and officers of which around 1,674 died, 3,400 were wounded and 378 went missing.

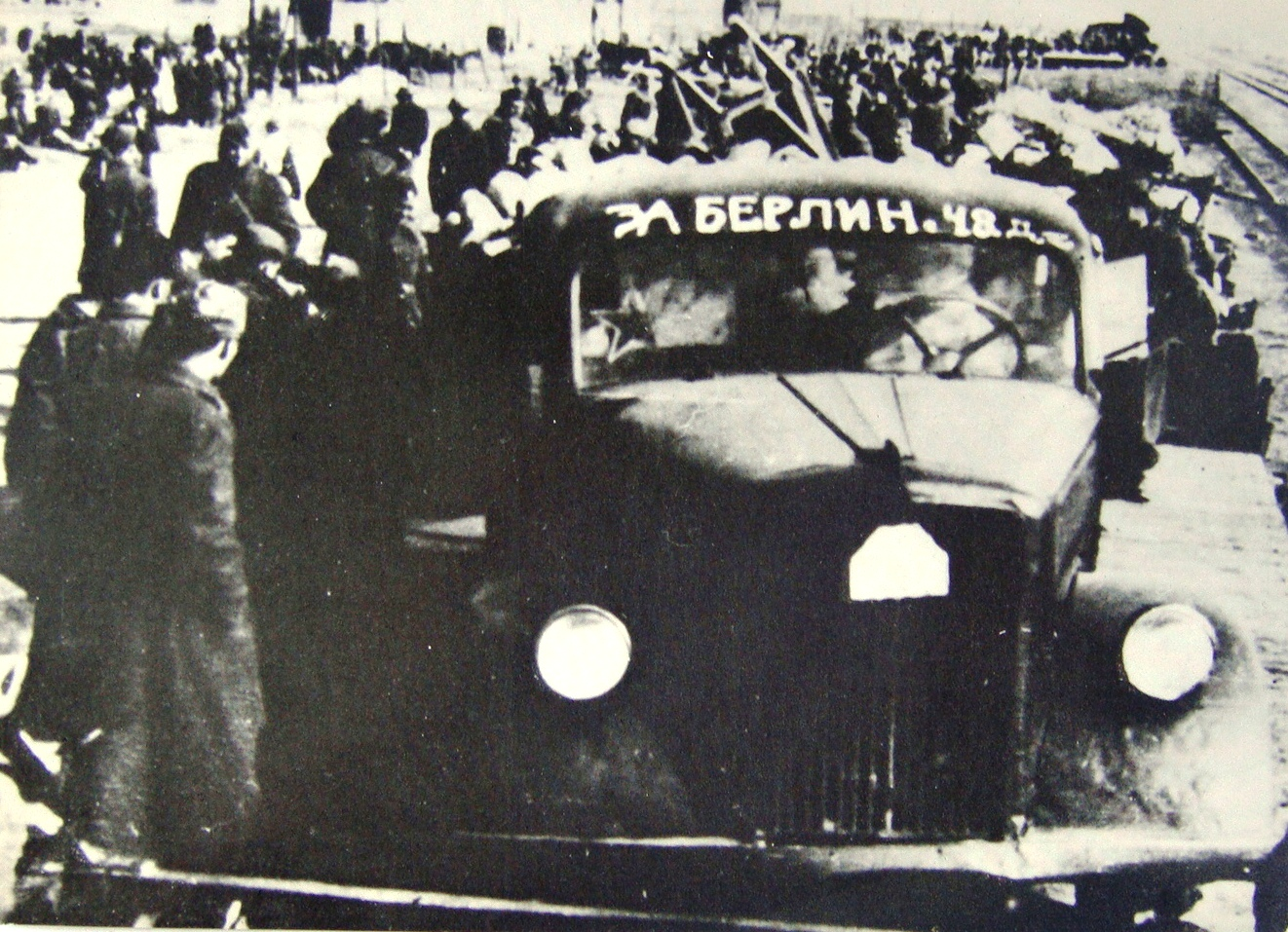
XV Macedonian corps on the way to Syrmian Front in January 1945. The letters on the truck say: "For Berlin".

Chronological composition by the number of the members of NOVM was as follows:

| | Late 1941 | Late 1942 | September 1943 | Late 1943 | August 1944 | Late 1944 |
|---|---|---|---|---|---|---|
| Macedonia | 1,000 | 2,000 | 10,000 | 7,000 | 8,000 | 66,000 |

=== Aftermath ===
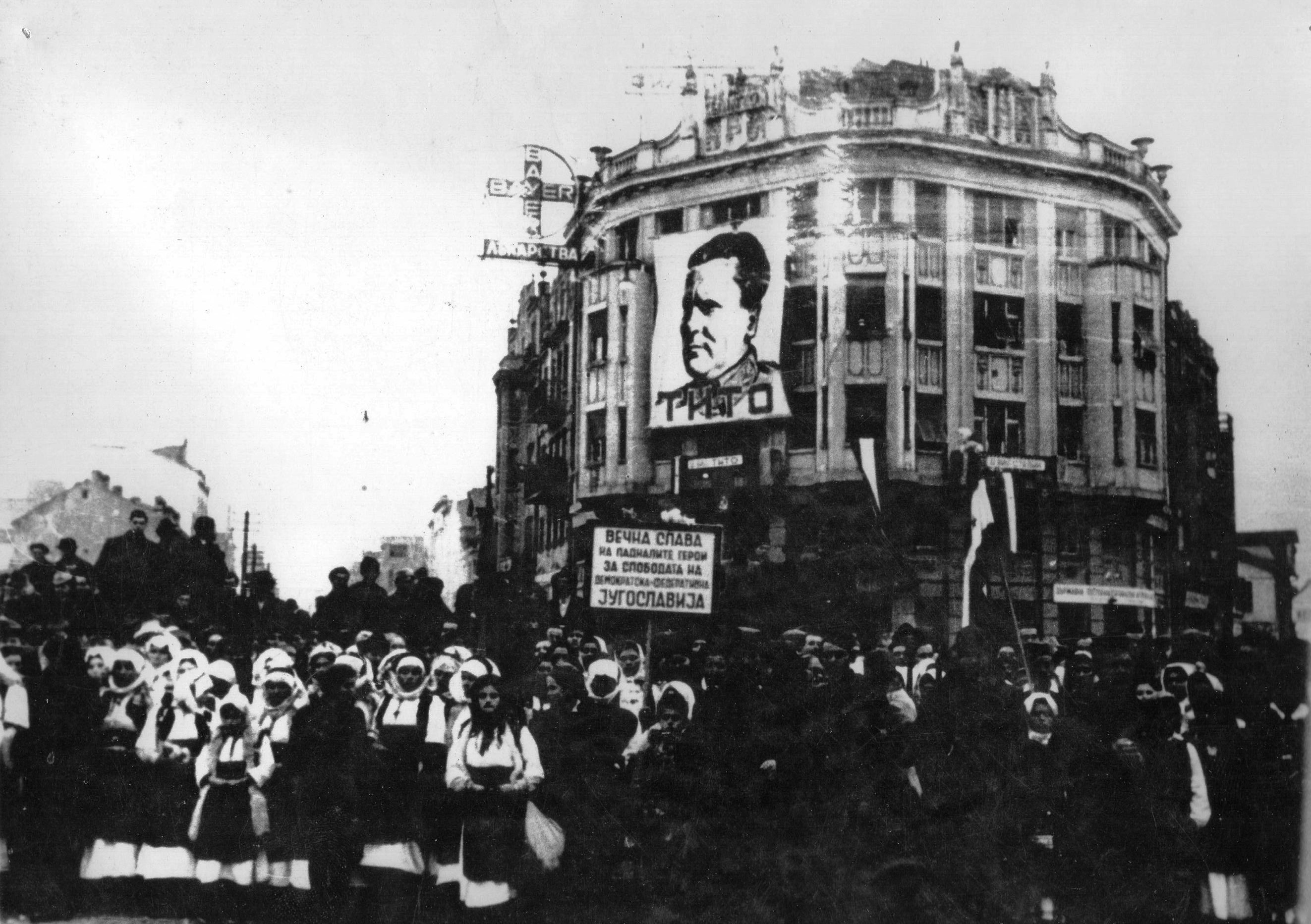
Macedonians lauding the liberation of Skopje in 1945. The inscription on the poster praises the fallen for the freedom of Democratic Federal Yugoslavia.

The total number of casualties in Macedonia from World War II was approximately 24,000, as follows: 7,000 Jews, 6,000 Serbians, 6,000 ethnic Macedonians, 4,000 Albanians and 1,000 Bulgarians. This includes around 3,000 "collaborationists", "counter-revolutionaries" and civilian victims, 7,000 Jews exterminated in concentration camps, and 14,000 resistance fighters and soldiers. According to Bogoljub Kočović the relative number of war losses was the lowest among the Macedonians, compared to the other ethnic groups in Yugoslavia:

Ethnicity
| Ethnicity | Relative loss |
|---|---|
| Jews | 77.9% |
| Roma | 31.4% |
| Montenegrins | 10.4% |
| Serbs | 6.9% |
| Muslims | 6.8% |
| Croats | 5.4% |
| Germans | 4.8% |
| Slovenes | 2.5% |
| Albanians | 1% |
| Hungarians | 1% |
| Macedonians | 0.9% |

According to a Yugoslav census from 1966 on the casualties of the war, the ethnic Macedonian victims were 6,724. It appears the number of ethnic Macedonian partisans killed from October 1941 to October 1944 in direct battles against Bulgarians is only several dozens. Indicative of the weak resistance for most of the war towards the Bulgarians, a case which is still a taboo topic in North Macedonia. They are result from different reasons as follows:

Reason for death
| Reason for death | Number of victims |
|---|---|
| Paramilitary, military and police terror. (Possibly here is included also part from the victims of then communists' repressions.) | 1,427 (ca. 1,200) |
| Soldiers who died from October 1944 to May 1945. (Most of them on the Srem Front in 1945.) | 3,548 (ca. 2,500) |
| Victims of Allied air-raids and bombings | 811 |
| In internment | 87 |
| Prisoners | 205 |
| In deportation | 70 |
| In April War of 1941 | 266 |
| Other reasons | 49 |
| Unclear circumstances | 67 |
| Partisans killed from October 1941 to October 1944. Most of them in Albanian zone. | 81 |
| POWs | 90 |
| Forced labor | 23 |
| Total number | 6,724 |

Despite Bulgaria's significant involvement on the side of the Allies at the end of the war, the country was not cast as a co-fighting country at the Paris Peace Conference, 1946 and was ordered to pay Yugoslavia war reparations for the occupation of Macedonia and Southern Serbia, which Yugoslavia unilaterally abandoned in 1947.

After the war for the first time in history, the Macedonian people managed to obtain their statehood, nation and language. These events marked the defeat of the Macedono-Bulgarianism and the victory of the Macedonianism in the area.

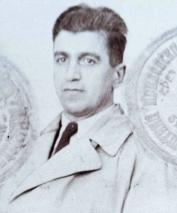
Shatorov was the leader of Macedonian communists in 1941. He disappeared under unknown circumstances in September 1944. There are indications that he was killed by Tito's agents as a politically inconvenient leader.

==== Communist repressions ====
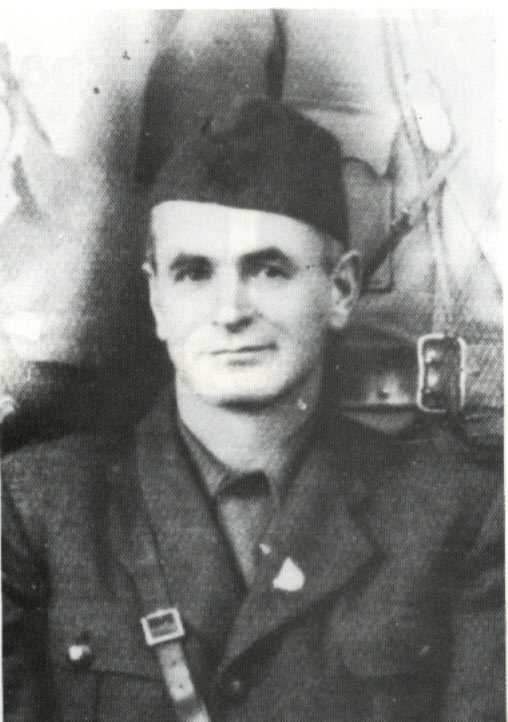
Metodija Andonov-Čento, the first president of the ASNOM and Democratic Federal Macedonia. After disagreement with the policy of new Yugoslavia he was arrested and sentenced to twelve years in prison.

After the liberation the Presidium of the Anti-Fascist Assembly for the People's Liberation of Macedonia (ASNOM), which was the governing body of Macedonia, made several statements and actions that were contradictory to the decisions of the Anti-Fascist Council of the People's Liberation of Yugoslavia (AVNOJ), the Yugoslav executive authority. Tito's General Headquarters sent orders asking the forces of the MNOV to participate in the fighting in the Syrmian Front for the final liberation of Yugoslavia. President Metodija Andonov-Čento and his associates debated whether to send the troops to Srem and help liberate Yugoslavia or to advance the troops under his command toward Greek Macedonia in order to "unify the Macedonian people" into one country. In January 1945, the former members of the Gotse Delchev Brigade then part of the XV Macedonian corps artillery platoon stationed at the Skopje Fortress, and one of its infantry platoons at Štip revolted against the order to be sent to the Srem front. They wanted to head to Thessaloniki as presumable capital of an imagined United Macedonia. Svetozar Vukmanović accused them of had fallen under Bulgarian influences. After they refused to disperse on both places, many were arrested on his order. According to some of the participants in this events there was no one shot as a consequence of the revolt. While according to Bulgarian sources there were dozens shot down. Andonov-Čento and his close associates were trying to minimize the ties with Yugoslavia as far as possible, which was contrary to the decisions of AVNOJ. As result Andonov-Čento was replaced by Lazar Koliševski, who started fully implementing the pro-Yugoslav line. Čento himself was later imprisoned. The fabricated charges against him were of being a Western spy, a traitor working against the SR Macedonia as part of SFR Yugoslavia, being in close contacts with IMRO terrorist, supporting a pro-Bulgarian plan of an Independent Macedonia, etc.

The new leadership of the People's Republic of Macedonia headed by Lazar Kolishevski confirmed the decisions of AVNOJ, and Macedonia joined Yugoslavia. Bosnia and Herzegovina, Croatia, Macedonia, Montenegro, Serbia, and Slovenia eventually all became part of the Socialist Federal Republic of Yugoslavia. The Macedonian national feelings were already ripe at that time as compared to 1941. Subsequently, to wipe out the remaining bulgarophile sentiments, the new Communist authorities persecuted the right-wing nationalists with the charges of "great-Bulgarian chauvinism". The next task was also to break up all the organisations that opposed the idea of Yugoslavia. So even older left-wing politicians, who were at some degree pro-Bulgarian oriented, were purged from their positions, then isolated, arrested and imprisoned on fabricated charges, as foreign agents, demanding greater independence, forming of conspirative political groups and the like. Besides, many people went throughout the labor camp of Goli Otok in the middle 1940s. The number of allegedly killed was 1,260 victims and also it is estimated that 50,000–100,000 were imprisoned, deported, sent to forced labor, tortured, etc. However, some Bulgarian researchers have questioned these figures, also noting that the assertion that these individuals were persecuted and killed solely on account of their Bulgarian national consciousness is deceptive.

==== Manipulation of historical events ====
Macedonian communists incorporated their structures into the BCP. At the same time sizable part of the local administration, the soldiers recruited in the Bulgarian Army and the police officers stationed in Vardar Macedonia were native from the area. Even the only victim of the attack on 11 October 1941, celebrated today as the day of the Macedonian Uprising against fascism, was a local man conscripted in the Bulgarian police. A significant part of the soldiers and some of the commanding officers during the occupation were local staff. Colonel Lyuben Apostolov, himself from Kriva Palanka, was responsible for the massacre in Vataša. After the Bulgarian coup d'etat of 1944, Apostolov was arrested and handed over to the authorities in Yugoslavia, where he was sentenced to death. However, after the war, the Yugoslav communist historiography did a lot to equate the term Bulgarians with "fascistic occupiers". Today are some revisionist opinions in North Macedonia, this conflict was merely a civil war, and the significant resistance movement against the Bulgarians is only a historical myth.

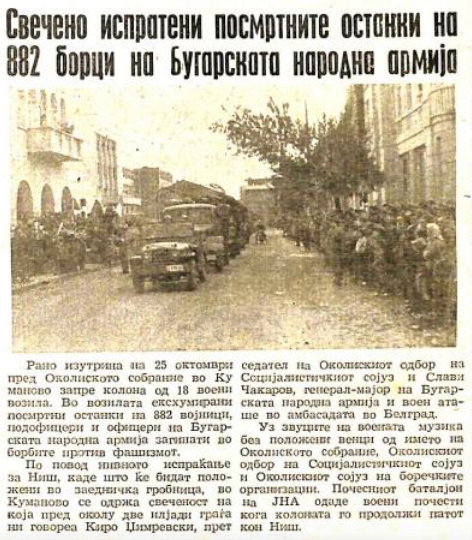
An announcement in Nash Vesnik from Kumanovo (01.11.1961). It concerns a military convoy transporting the remains of hundreds of Bulgarian soldiers to a new memorial build in the city of Niš. They were victims of the fighting with the Germans from the fall of 1944.

It became clear in the autumn of 1944, that the Bulgarian army supporting the Belgrade Offensive of the 3rd Ukrainian Front, was the real force behind the driving the German Army Group E, counting ca. 300,000 soldiers, out of Southern Serbia, Kosovo and Macedonia. Nevertheless, the official Yugoslav and later Macedonian historiography, has played down its role by political grounds, actually at the cost of historical deceptions. For example, according to Macedonian sources Bulgarians did not participate in the operations for the capture of Skopje in the mid of November 1944, even as observers. Once the city was seized by the guerrillas, they were not even allowed to enter it. Nevertheless, the city was seized not without the decisive role of the Bulgarian troops. Per German military historian Karl Hnilicka, the Bulgarians developed their advance towards Skopje into a large-scale offensive, which gave rise to the danger for Army Group E of being cut off. The situation was desperate and the town was evacuated urgently at the night of 13/14 November. As result on 13 and 14 November parts of the First and Fourth Bulgarian Armies entered Skopje. According to the British commissioner in the Allied Commission in Sofia – general Walter Oxley, Skopje was seized after several Bulgarian attacks, while the partisans were waiting on the hills around, but they moved on in time to support the Bulgarian entry into the city. Bulgarian sources maintain at first they entered the town, and namely Bulgarian detachments seized also its center at midnight.

Subsequently, a lot of Partisan monuments and memorials were built in SR Macedonia. Meanwhile, ca. 3,000 Bulgarian victims buried in different cemeteries in Yugoslavia, were collected in two ossuaries – in Nis and in Vukovar. The rest from the military cemeteries, including all of them in North Macedonia, were obliterated. Some of the Bulgarian victims were returned and buried in Bulgaria. In general 3,422 Bulgarian soldiers were killed and 2,136 were missing in the autumn of 1944 in Southern Serbia, North Macedonia and Kosovo.

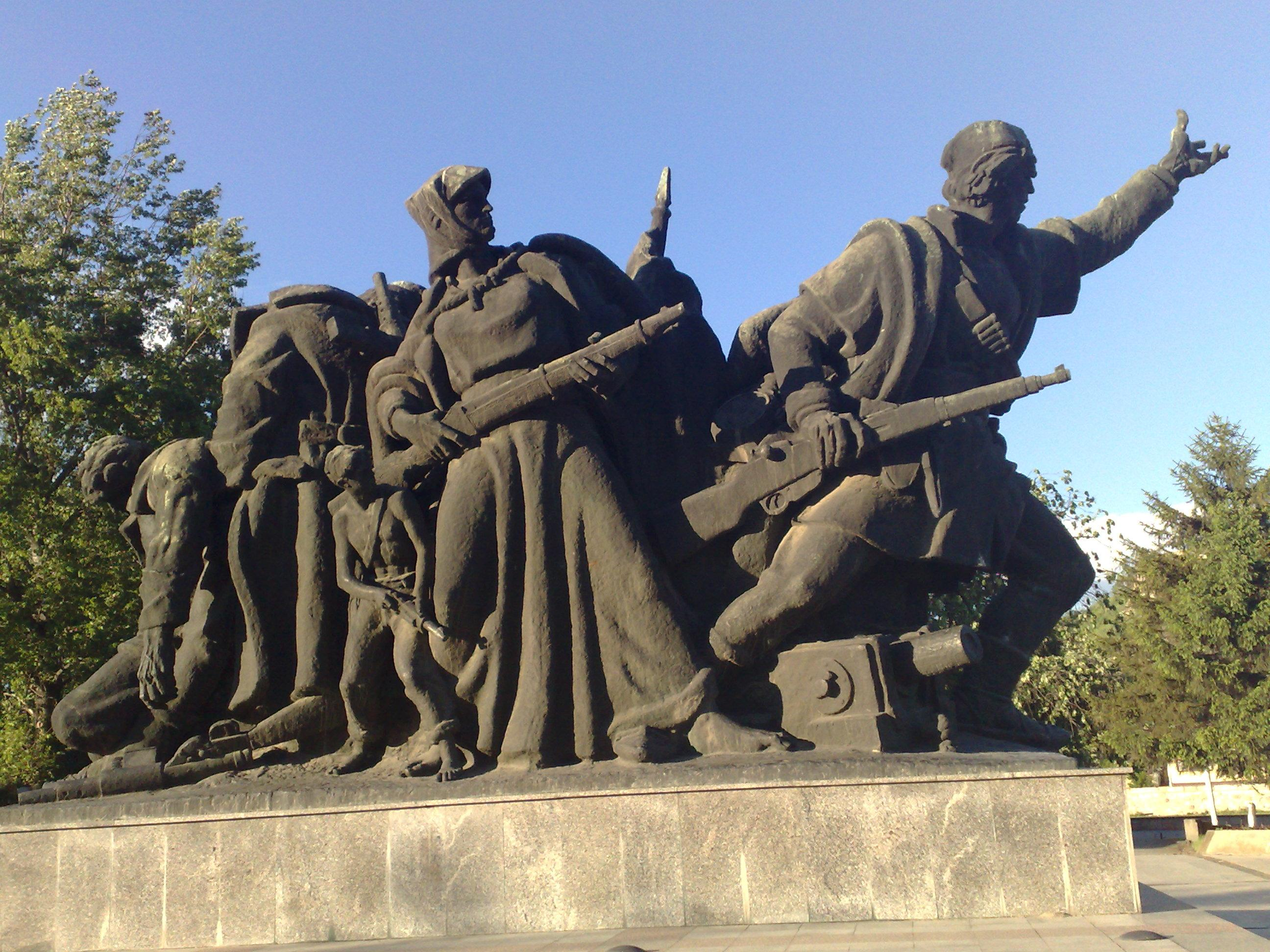
Liberatiors of Skopje monument, by Ivan Mirkovic, 1955. The sculpture depicts a cluster of Communist guerrillas. The whole composition was influenced by the principles of socialist realism reminiscent of the respective Soviet propaganda style of art.

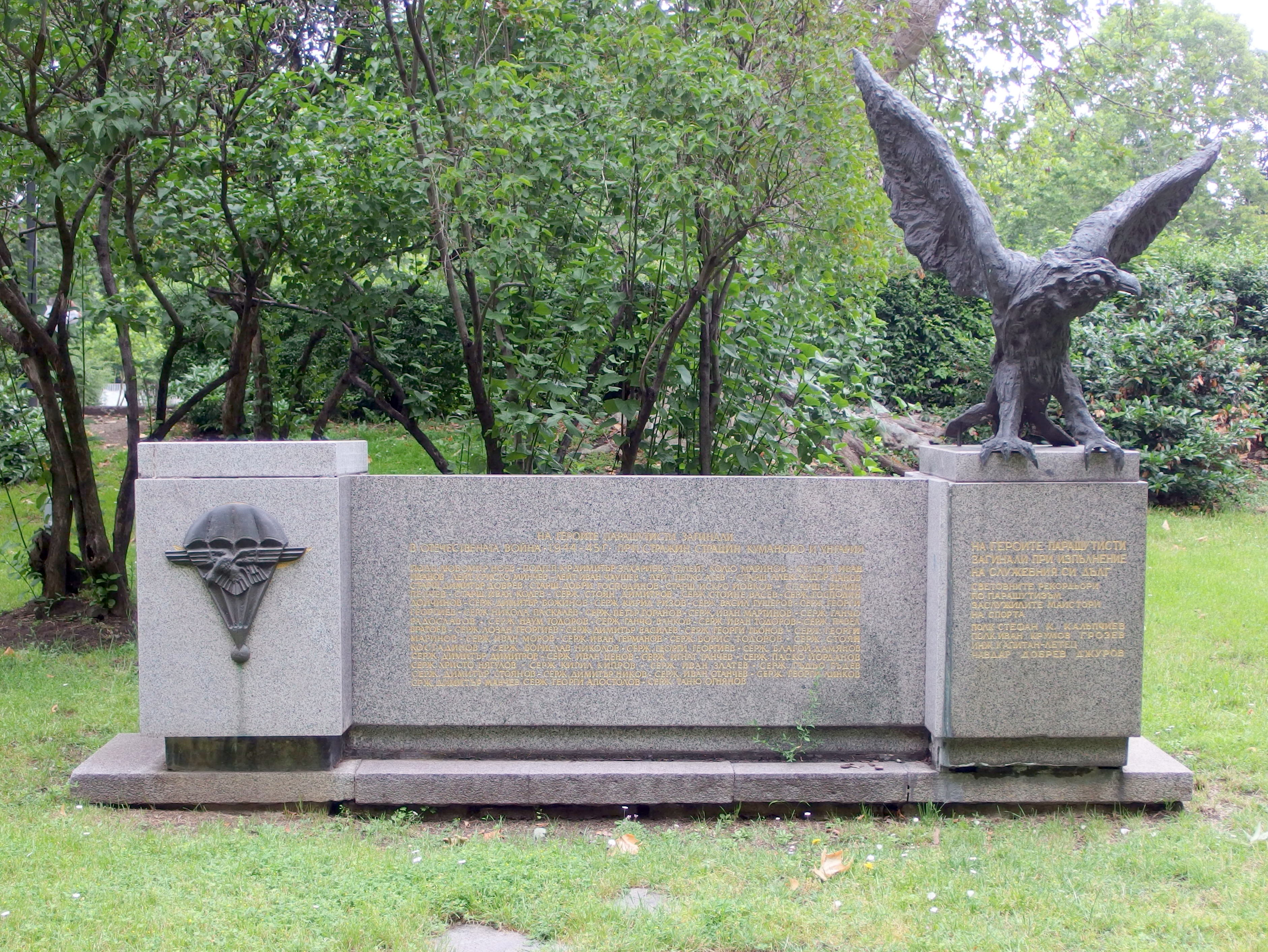
Monument of the Bulgarian paratroopers fallen in North Macedonia in the autumn of 1944 (Sofia). Macedonian sources claim the Bulgarians didn't carry out any serious battles then. Bulgarian sources insist 2,000–3,000 soldiers are fallen in North Macedonia at that time.

==== Modern references ====
According to the Bulgarian Association for Research and Development of Civil Society, the 2016 WW2 Macedonian film The Liberation of Skopje, is a propagandist piece against Bulgaria and breeds anti-Bulgarian hatred, sponsored by the Macedonian government. Another Macedonian movie The Third Half was also controversial in Bulgaria over its depiction of Bulgarians in WW2. Bulgarian members of the European Parliament – expressed outrage over the film and claimed it was an attempt to manipulate the Balkan history and to spread hate against Bulgaria. They have insisted the Macedonian government has overdone with its nationalist activities. In October 2019 the Bulgarian government set tough terms for North Macedonia's EU candidature and part of them are to remove the phrase "Bulgarian fascistic occupiers" from all World War II historical landmarks, as well as to begin the rehabilitation of all people who suffered under former Yugoslav communist rule because of their Bulgarian identity. Bulgaria insists also the two countries must "harmonize" historic literature "overcoming the hate speech" against Bulgaria. In November 2020 Bulgaria blocked the official start of EU accession talks with North Macedonia. In an interview with Bulgarian media in the same month, the Prime Minister Zoran Zaev acknowledged the involvement of Bulgarian troops in the capture of Skopje and other Macedonian towns, as well as that Bulgarians were not fascist occupiers. The interview was a shock and was followed by a wave of hysterical nationalism in Skopje as well by protests demanding Zaev's resignation. According to the opinion of the former Macedonian Prime Minister Ljubčo Georgievski, these reactions are organized by the post-Yugoslav deep state, and are the result of ignorance, hypocrisy or politicking. On the other hand, another former Prime Minister Vlado Buckovski, reacted that Macedonians and Bulgarians were natural allies, and were estranged intentionally by the Yugoslav policy after the WWII.

== See also ==
- List of World War II monuments and memorials in the Republic of Macedonia
- Bulgarian resistance movement during World War II
- Anti-partisan operations in World War II
- Seven anti-Partisan offensives
- Macedonian Question
- Military history of Albania during World War II
- Military history of Bulgaria during World War II
- Military history of Germany during World War II
- Military history of Italy during World War II
- Military history of the Republic of Macedonia
- Timeline of World War II
- Titoism

== Sources ==
- Bulajić, Danilo; Ćurčić, Jovan; Damjanović, Verica; Ilijev, Bogoljub; Ljumović, Pavle; Katanić, Petar; Kovačević, Stevan (1980). Leksikon Narodnooslobodilačkog rata i revolucije u Jugoslaviji 1941–1945 [Lexicon of the National Liberation War and Revolution in Yugoslavia 1941–1945] (in Bosnian). Vol. II. Belgrade and Ljubljana: Narodna knjiga – Partizanska knjiga.
- Schubert, Gabriella; Harrassowitz Verlag, Otto (2005). Makedonien: Prägungen und Perspektiven [Macedonia: Characteristics and Perspectives]. Forschungen zu Südosteuropa : Sprache – Kultur – Literatur (in German). Harrassowitz. pp. 45–51. ISBN 978-3-447-05277-1.
- Stojanovski, Aleksandar; Katardžiev, Ivan; Zografski, Dančo (1988). Историја на македонскиот народ [History of the Macedonian Nation] (in Macedonian). Skopje.
- Svetozarevikj, Branislav (2021). Македонци - милениумски сведошва за идентитетското име: (извори и анализи). Napredok. ISBN 9786082130248.
- Troebst, Stefan; Dabrowski, Patrice (2017). "Uses and Abuses of the Past". In Livezeanu, Irina; von Klimó, Arpád (eds.). The Routledge History of East Central Europe Since 1700. Routledge. ISBN 978-1-351-86342-1.

=== Comprehensive historic overview ===
- Macedonia During World War II

=== Miscellaneous ===
- Im Schatten des Krieges. Besatzung oder Anschluss – Befreiung oder Unterdrückung?. Eine komparative Untersuchung über die bulgarische Herrschaft in Vardar-Makedonien 1915–1918 und 1941–1944 Reihe: Studien zur Geschichte, Kultur und Gesellschaft Südosteuropas Jahr: 2005 ISBN 3-8258-7997-6
- "Ko čelik sme nie" – Battle March of the Third Macedonian Schock Brigade (composed by Panče Pešev and written by Aco Šopov)
