= Bulgarian Action Committees =

Revolutionary organizations during World War II

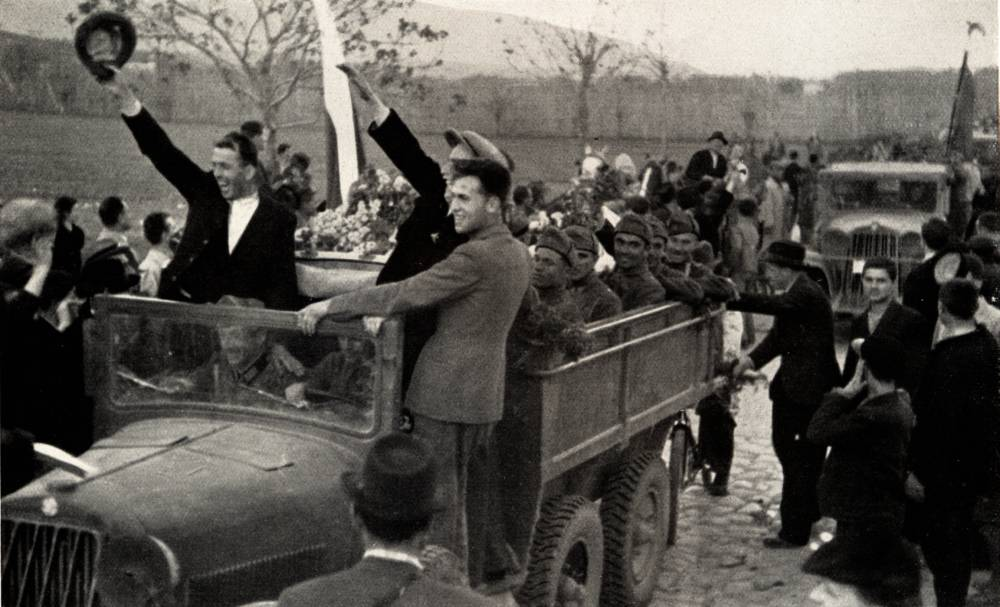
Macedonian Bulgarians welcomed the Bulgarian troops in April 1941.

The Bulgarian Action Committees in Macedonia were collaborationist nationalist organizations of Bulgarians in Macedonia during 1941, emboldened by the invasion of Yugoslavia by Nazi Germany, determined to end the Yugoslav rule in the region, perceived as oppressive by Macedonian Bulgarians and by the representatives of other communities or political tendencies in Vardar Macedonia. They were also encouraged by the friendly relations between Nazi Germany and Bulgaria, and by the hope that after the German Army swept through the Bulgarian one succeed it. The time of the Bulgarian Action Committees was a time witnessing an acute lack of authority. The Serbs in authority positions had fled most of the region, not out of fear of the Germans, but primarily out of terror from their local collaborators. The Bulgarian Action Committees sought to take control of the region for Bulgaria, laying the groundwork for Bulgarian rule. The Executive Committee of the organization was headed by: Stefan Stefanov from Kratovo, president, Spiro Kitinchev from Skopje, vice-president, and Vasil Hadzhikimov from Štip (Novo selo), secretary. In Veles Bulgarian Action Committees received the active support by popular communist functionaries as Panko Brashnarov.

When the Yugoslav rule was replaced by German military administration, and then finally by Bulgarian occupation, these goals were realized. On May 18, 1941, the German military command in Skopje officially handed over the administrative power to the Bulgarian state. However, once the region and administration were organized, the Action Committees became marginalized, and ultimately dissolved.

== See also ==
- World War II in Yugoslav Macedonia
- Bulgaria during WWII
