= List of massacres in North Macedonia =

The following is a list of massacres that have occurred in North Macedonia and its predecessors:

== Late Ottoman period ==
Name	Date	Location	Deaths	Perpetrator	Victims	Notes
Massacre of the Albanian Beys	9 or 26 August 1830	Bitola, Ottoman Empire	500	Ottoman forces	Albanian beys	Albanian beys massacred by Ottoman forces.
Ilinden–Preobrazhenie Uprising	2 August – October 1903	Ottoman Empire (Throughout modern-day Bulgaria, Turkey, Greece and North Macedonia)	Over 4,500	Ottoman forces	Bulgarians and Aromanians	Macedonian Bulgarians and Aromanian civilians massacred by Ottoman forces.
Kokošinje murders	1904	Kokošinje	53	IMRO	Serbs	IMRO komitadjis killed 53 Serbs.

== Balkan Wars and World War I ==
Name	Date	Location	Deaths	Perpetrator	Victims	Notes
Takeover of Skopje	1912	Kumanovo and Skopje	3,000	Serbian forces	Albanians	Albanians were killed by Serbs.
Slaughter in Bitola	1913	Hospitals in Bitola		Serbian forces	Turkish patients	When Serbian forces entered Bitola, they killed Turkish patients to make room for injured Serbs.
Tikveš uprising	1913	Tikvešija	1,200	Serbian forces	Bulgarians	Serbian forces killed Bulgarian civilians and burned hundreds of homes.
Ohrid–Debar uprising	1913	Ohrid and Debar	up to 1,000	Serbian forces	Albanians, Turks and Bulgarians	Serbian forces killed hundreds of Turks, Bulgarians and Albanians and burned hundreds of homes.
Bitola massacre	1915	Kičevo and Kruševo	555	Bulgarian forces aided by the IMRO	Albanians	Bulgarian forces killed hundreds of Albanian civilians and burned hundreds of homes.
Štip massacre	1915	Ljuboten, Štip region	118–120	Bulgarian forces aided by the IMRO	Serbian soldiers	

== Interwar period ==
Name	Date	Location	Deaths	Perpetrator	Victims	Notes
Massacre in Kadrifakovo	16 January 1923	Kadrifakovo	20–30	IMRO	Serb colonists	Serb colonists were killed by an IMRO detachment led by Ivan Barlyo.
Massacre in Garvan	3 March 1923	Garvan, Konče Municipality	28–29 or 53	Yugoslav troops	Bulgarian villagers	All male inhabitants of Garvan were killed on the orders of Dobrica Matković.

== World War II ==
Name	Date	Location	Deaths	Perpetrator	Victims	Notes
Vataša massacre	16 June 1943	Near Vataša	12	Bulgarian forces	Male youths	Anti-partisan offensive launched by the Bulgarian occupation authorities against the communist resistance and its helpers.
Beličica massacre	19 September 1944	Beličica, Mavrovo and Rostuše Municipality	38	Balli Kombëtar	Macedonian villagers and Partisans	Around 300 Ballists indiscriminately massacre the local population and partisan fighters.
Šutovo massacre	Autumn of 1944	Present day Kičevo Municipality, North Macedonia	16	Macedonian Partisans	Albanian men	Massacre of Albanians after the capture of the village by Partisan forces
Radolišta massacre	28 October 1944	Present-day Struga Municipality, North Macedonia	84	Wehrmacht	Albanians	Massacre of Albanians by the armed forces of Nazi Germany.
Zajas massacre	Autumn 1944	Zajas, present-day North Macedonia	320	Macedonian Partisans and OZNA	Albanians	Albanian inhabitants of Zajas massacred by Macedonian Partisans and the OZNA after capturing the city from the Balli Kombëtar.
Blace massacre	1 November 1944	Blace, present-day North Macedonia	120	Macedonian Partisans from the XVI Macedonian Partisan Brigade	Albanians	Albanians civilians killed by Macedonian partisans under the pretext of collaboration with the occupier.
Sopot massacre	3-4 November 1944	Sopot, present-day North Macedonia	68	Macedonian Partisans from the XVII Macedonian Partisan Brigade and Chetniks	Albanians	On 3 and 4 November 1944, the village was the scene of a massacre, in which a total of 68 Albanians were killed by the XVII Macedonian Partisan Brigade and members of the Chetnik movement.
Bloody Christmas (1945)	January 1945	Throughout the Socialist Republic of Macedonia	1,200	Yugoslav Macedonian communists	Bulgarians	Macedonian Bulgarian children, women, and men found in mass graves.

== Modern period ==
Name	Date	Location	Deaths	Perpetrator	Victims	Notes
Vejce massacre	28 April 2001	Tetovo region, on the Šar Mountains, Republic of Macedonia (now North Macedonia)	8	NLA	Macedonian policemen and soldiers	Macedonian policemen and soldiers massacred by Albanian militants.
Karpalak massacre	8 August 2001	Motorway Skopje - Tetovo, near the village of Grupčin, Republic of Macedonia (now North Macedonia)	10	NLA	Macedonian soldiers	Macedonian Army reservists killed by Albanian militants.
Ljubotenski Bačila massacre	10 August 2001	Locality Ljubotenski Bačila on the Skopska Crna Gora mountains, between the villages of Ljuboten and Ljubanci, Republic of Macedonia (now North Macedonia)	8	NLA	Macedonian soldiers	Macedonian Army reservists killed by Albanian militants.
Ljuboten massacre	12 August 2001	Ljuboten, Republic of Macedonia (now North Macedonia)	10	Macedonian police	Albanian civilians	Massacre of Albanian civilians two days after an ambush of Macedonian soldiers by the NLA.
Smilkovci Lake massacre	12 April 2012	Butel Municipality, Republic of Macedonia (now North Macedonia)	5	Albanians	Macedonian civilians	Five Macedonian men aged between 18 and 21 years old found killed near Skopje. Subsequent investigations found that they were killed by Albanians.
