= Karpalak ambush =

Incident during the 2001 insurgency in Macedonia

- Part of the Battle of Tetovo and 2001 insurgency in Macedonia
Date	8 August 2001
Location	Near Grupčin, on the Skopje–Tetovo highway, Macedonia 41°58′39″N 21°10′12″E
Result	NLA and ANA victory: Macedonian Air Force bombs predominantly Albanian villages around Tetovo; Anti-Albanian sentiment spread across Prilep with Anti-Albanian protests and riots across the city; Peace negotiations continue, eventually leading to the Ohrid Agreement

Belligerents
National Liberation Army; Albanian National Army	Macedonia

Commanders and leaders
Unknown; Unknown	Nane Naumoski †; Sašo Kitanoski †

Units involved
National Liberation Army; Brigade 112 "Mujdin Aliu"; Albanian National Army	Macedonian Army; Military Reserve Force; Prilep Garrison

Strength
Unknown	120 reservists

Casualties and losses
None; None	10 reservists killed 3 reservists wounded 1 truck destroyed 1 bus destroyed
- Location within North Macedonia

The Karpalak ambush (Macedonian: Заседа кај Карпалак; Albanian: Pritë në Karpalak), referred to by Macedonians as the Karpalak massacre (Macedonian: Масакр кај Карпалак), was an attack carried out by the National Liberation Army (NLA) against a convoy of the Army of the Republic of Macedonia (ARM) near the village of Grupčin on 8 August 2001 during the 2001 insurgency in Macedonia. Ten members of the ARM's Military Reserve Force, including two officers, were killed at Karpalak and three others were wounded. The ambush was the single deadliest incident of the conflict. It was speculated that the ambush was carried out in retaliation for a Macedonian police raid in Skopje, the day before in which five NLA insurgents were killed.

In the years following the ambush, the Macedonian government has commissioned several plaques commemorating the fallen reservists, which have become the frequent target of vandals. This has prompted complaints from veterans' organizations that the government has not done enough to ensure the reservists are properly commemorated.

== Background ==
On 7 August 2001, the Macedonian police carried out a raid in Skopje targeting a rebel cell allegedly planning attacks in the capital. Five rebels were killed during the raid and the police confiscated a cache of weapons, along with thirty people being arrested.

== Ambush ==
On 8 August 2001, a convoy of five vehicles transporting 120 members of the ARM's Military Reserve Force was ambushed by the NLA outside the village of Grupčin, near the locale of Karpalak, on the highway between Skopje and Tetovo at 9:30 am. The reservists had been on their way to reinforce a military base in Tetovo. One of the ARM trucks was struck by a rocket-propelled grenade. Those who did not burn to death in the resulting explosion were shot as they attempted to escape the vehicle.

In total, ten ARM reservists were killed in the ambush. Among the dead were two officers. Three soldiers were wounded. The fallen reservists were later identified as Captain Nane Naumoski, Sašo Kitanoski, Goran Minoski, Erdovan Šabanoski, Ljube Grujoski, Branko Sekuloski, Darko Veljanoski, Pece Sekuloski, Vebi Rušitoski and Marko Despotoski, all from Prilep.

The ambush was the single deadliest attack of the conflict. Splinter ethnic Albanian rebel group Albanian National Army claimed responsibility for the attack. It was speculated that it may have been carried out as retribution for the police killing of five NLA insurgents in Skopje a day earlier.

== Aftermath ==
=== Anti-Albanian incidents ===
Macedonia's chief prosecutor, Stavre Djikov, visited the scene of the attack shortly after it occurred. In direct response to it, the ARM deployed additional reinforcements to Tetovo, including ten main battle tanks, as well as multiple trucks loaded with soldiers. Combat aircraft later flew over Karpalak in a show of force. In the day after the ambush, the ten reservists were buried with military honours at a Prilep cemetery, their coffins draped in the flag of Macedonia. "[The] Albanians will rot in hell," one father exclaimed as he sobbed over his son's coffin. In the same day, Macedonian president Boris Trajkovski dismissed the ARM's chief of staff, General Pande Petrovski. He was succeeded by his deputy, General Metodij Stamboliski, marking the fourth such change of the ARM's senior leadership in less than two months.

Anti-Albanian protests in Prilep and Skopje, Macedonia, began after the ambush. A night of rioting ensued in which ethnic Macedonians burned the Čarši Mosque in Prilep, as well as multiple ethnic Albanian homes. Macedonia's Defence Minister, Vlado Bučkovski, appealed for the rioters to show restraint and refrain from attacking Albanian-owned properties. In Skopje, youths threw rocks at shops which they suspected might be owned by ethnic Albanians, and rioters broke into the barracks of a supply depot. Reports say six shops and two houses were destroyed.

In Skopje, around 100 local youths threw rocks at shops which they suspected might be owned by ethnic Albanians. Barricades were set up near the parliament building were they shattered shop windows and businesses. Some of the locals looted the shops in both Prilep and Skopje.

In response to the ambush, the Macedonian National Security Council ordered a military offensive. On 10 August, Macedonian Air Force Sukhoi Su-25 jets bombed rebel positions near Tetovo. Villages near Tetovo were also bombed. In the same day, eight Macedonian soldiers were killed due to a landmine.

On 12 August, the Macedonian police attacked Ljuboten and extrajudicially killed ten ethnic Albanian civilians. Macedonian Minister of the Interior Ljube Boškoski and his assistant Johan Tarčulovski were later charged with war crimes by the International Tribunal for the former Yugoslavia in relation to this action. In 2008, Boškoski was acquitted on all counts, whereas Tarčulovski was found guilty and sentenced to twelve years' imprisonment. Both verdicts were upheld in 2010.

=== Ohrid Agreement ===
The Karpalak ambush, as well as the landmine explosion at Ljuboten, coincided with ongoing peace negotiations between the Macedonian government and representatives of the country's ethnic Albanian minority. "This is clearly a setback for the peace process," U.S. envoy James Pardew remarked, referring to the recent Macedonian casualties, "but it is critical that this agreement is signed on Monday." On 13 August 2001, government officials met with representatives of the country's two largest ethnic Albanian political parties, the Democratic Party of Albanians and the Party for Democratic Prosperity, in Ohrid and signed an agreement to end the conflict. By signing the Ohrid Agreement, representatives of the country's ethnic Albanian community agreed to disband the NLA, which was subsequently transformed into the Democratic Union for Integration, Macedonia's largest ethnic Albanian political party. Macedonia remained a unitary republic, but its constitution was altered to allow for affirmative action policies in the public sector that would benefit its ethnic Albanian population, as well as for wider use of the Albanian flag and language. In practice, this entailed the Macedonian government vowing to recognize Albanian as the second official language in areas where ethnic Albanians formed more than 20 percent of the population, recognizing and extending state support to the Albanian-language State University of Tetova, recruiting 1,000 ethnic Albanians into the Macedonian Police and offering an amnesty to all NLA members. On 19 August, Ahmeti announced the NLA would surrender its weapons to NATO. Most analysts agreed that the NLA had not fully respected the terms of the agreement and only surrendered a portion of its arms.

== Legacy ==
The Macedonian Ministry of Internal Affairs designated the ambush as a terrorist attack. In February 2014, the head of the Islamic Religious Community of Macedonia, Grand Mufti Sulejman Rexhepi, wrote a Facebook post in which he accused the mayor of Prilep, Marjan Risteski, of taking part in the burning of Prilep's Čarši Mosque in August 2001. Rexhepi also asserted that all those who had taken part in its destruction had experienced divine retribution, and that the same fate would befall Risteski. Rexhepi's remarks were defended by Rexhepi's spokesman, Abaz Islami. Risteski later stated that he had forgiven Rexhepi for what he had said. Igor Petreski, the head of the veterans' organization Karpalak, defended the mayor's wartime record and vouched that Risteski had been on the front lines in Tetovo the night the mosque was torched.

There were annual informal commemorations of the victims by their families. The first commemoration took place in 2003. Several commemorative plaques were also placed in Prilep and its surroundings, while additional two memorials were placed in 2013. In the years following the ambush, the Macedonian authorities dedicated multiple plaques to commemorate the victims, most of which were later damaged or destroyed by unknown perpetrators. On the fifteenth anniversary of the attack, Jordan Trajkoski, a representative of the Association of Retired Reservist Army Soldiers, complained that the authorities had not done enough to memorialize the reservists.

== See also ==
- Vejce ambush, a similar incident that took place in April 2001
- Treboš ambush, an attack that occurred after the insurgency
