= 2001 Skopje police raid =

Macedonian police operation

Skopje police raid
- Part of the 2001 insurgency in Macedonia
Date	7 August 2001
Location	Skopje, Macedonia
Result	Macedonian victory

Belligerents
Macedonian police	National Liberation Army

Commanders and leaders
Ljube Boškoski	Lefter Koxhaj †

Units involved
Special police unit "Tigers"	Skanderbeg special unit

Strength
200+ policemen	Unknown

Casualties and losses
None	5 killed
- 30 arrested 4 detained

During the 2001 insurgency in Macedonia, a raid was conducted by the Macedonian police against ethnic Albanian rebels in a suburb of Skopje on 7 August. The police killed the rebel group and captured their weapon supplies.

== Raid ==
The Macedonian special police unit "Tigers" performed a raid on 7 August 2001, in the Skopje suburb of Čair around 4:00 a.m. (UTC+2). Five rebels were killed by the police in the raid. National Liberation Army (NLA) commander Lefter Koxhaj, also known as Commander Teli, was among those killed. According to the Macedonian interior minister Ljube Boškovski, the Macedonian police acted on information that NLA rebels were planning an attack on the capital and that they would attack from the nearby village of Aračinovo, the site of the Aračinovo crisis a month prior, after which they were evacuated by NATO forces. During the fighting in Aračinovo, the rebels claimed they would attack the capital city of Skopje, including the airport and oil refinery and that they had infiltrated cells ready to attack.

Per Boškovski, the police tried to arrest the rebels, encountered "strong armed resistance" and returned fire. He reported that 30 people were arrested in the police operation. The Macedonian police found a large quantity of weapons, including 6 assault rifles, 5 grenade launchers, 400 rounds of ammunition, 5 pistols, 3 grenades and combat uniforms. During the operation, four suspects were taken to the Gazi Baba police station for interrogation on suspicion of being members of the NLA.

== Aftermath ==
On the following day, an investigator of the Human Rights Watch who was on the scene, Peter Bouckaert, said there was no evidence of "strong armed resistance" and that the men were lying down when they were shot. According to a report in The Washington Post: "The house looked more like the scene of a summary execution. A reporter saw no signs that the victims had fired a shot at the raiders. Windows were closed, and no bullet holes nicked the walls or ceiling. The front door had not been forced open." The Albanian-language news media reported the killing as a premeditated execution, describing the scene in detail. The broadcasting of Albanian-language news on Macedonian Radio Television was interrupted for 23 days. Two suspects who were detained were released. Another suspect was kept in custody but later released in December 2001 following a presidential amnesty for members of the NLA. One suspect went missing.

Ethnic Albanian politicians acknowledged the police raid and the deaths but refused to comment. Members of the NLA and ethnic Albanians claimed the men were civilians. On 8 August, the NLA attacked a Macedonian army convoy near Tetovo in what would become known as Karpalak ambush, supposedly as retaliation for the five Albanians killed by the police during the raid.
