= Johan Tarčulovski =

Macedonian war criminal

- Јохан Тарчуловски (in Macedonian)
- Born: November 17, 1974 (age 51); Ljubanci, SR Macedonia, SFR Yugoslavia
- Education: Goce Delčev University of Štip
- Political party: VMRO-DPMNE
- Spouse: Sonja Veličkova
- Children: 3
- Military career
- Allegiance: Macedonia
- Branch: Macedonian Police
- Service years: 2001
- Unit: Tigers (Tigri)
- Conflicts: Insurgency in the Republic of Macedonia
- Criminal information
- Status: Released
- Convictions: War crimes (Murder, wanton destruction and cruel treatment)
- Trial: International Criminal Tribunal for the Former Yugoslavia
- Penalty: 12 years

Johan Tarčulovski (born November 17, 1974) is a Macedonian convicted war criminal, former police commander, and politician. Tarčulovski was convicted for murder, wanton destruction and cruel treatment in Ljuboten during the 2001 conflict by the International Criminal Tribunal for the Former Yugoslavia (ICTY). He is the only Macedonian who was convicted for war crimes by the Hague Tribunal. Among his political roles, he was a security inspector for Macedonian president Boris Trajkovski and served as a member of parliament.

== Life ==
Tarčulovski was born in the village Ljubanci, SR Macedonia, SFR Yugoslavia (present-day Butel Municipality, North Macedonia), on November 17, 1974. He and his wife, Sonja (née Veličkova), a Macedonian folk singer, have three children. Tarčulovski has been a member of VMRO-DPMNE since its establishment. In 1993, he became the president of the Youth Force Union of the party for the Čair Municipality. After the victory of the party in the 1998 elections, he became a member of Macedonian prime minister Ljubčo Georgievski's security. Afterwards, he served as an inspector in the Security Service of Macedonian president Boris Trajkovski.

Tarčulovski led a police operation on August 12, 2001, in Ljuboten in retaliation of a mine attack of Macedonian soldiers near Ljuboten two days earlier. Tarčulovski was indicted, along with Ljube Boškoski, on March 15, 2005. He and Boškoski were the only Macedonian citizens to be prosecuted at the Hague Tribunal for events during the 2001 insurgency in Macedonia. After the indictment, there was little public reaction in Macedonia. Macedonian authorities arrested him and extradited him to The Hague on March 16, 2005.

He was brought before the international court in The Hague. Tarčulovski pled not guilty on April 18, 2005. On July 10, 2008, he was convicted and sentenced to 12 years in prison (including time spent in custody), as the trial chamber found him guilty of "ordering, planning and instigating the murder of three ethnic Albanian civilians in the village of Ljuboten, the wanton destruction of 12 houses or other property and the cruel treatment of 13 ethnic Albanian civilians". However, the chamber also found that Tarčulovski was also acting under a superior's orders during the operation. The presiding judge stated: "The evidence does not enable the person or persons responsible for the orders to Johan Tarculovski to be identified. The circumstances confirm it was a person or persons superior to him." The chamber also did not find him as responsible for four other deaths. With his conviction, he became the only Macedonian to be convicted for war crimes by the Hague Tribunal.

He appealed against his sentence. The International Criminal Tribunal for the former Yugoslavia upheld his conviction and 12-year prison sentence. The Appeals Chamber rejected his appeal on May 19, 2010. On July 7, 2011, he was transferred to a prison in Germany. In February 2013, he appealed for early release to the German authorities. In this 2013 application for early release, German authorities sent a psychological report, where it was mentioned that he lacked remorse for his offenses and saw others as being responsible for him. After completing two-thirds of his sentence, he became eligible for early release in March. On April 8, the Hague Tribunal granted him early release. The tribunal president cited psychological reports which mentioned that he did not have negative sentiments against local ethnic Albanians. Despite the lack of remorse, the president said he "appears to be a well behaved prisoner" and would not threaten society if released. Locals in his birth village celebrated the news about his early release. Tarčulovski was released from prison in the town Diez on April 10. He was welcomed by his wife, close friends and expatriates, as well as the Macedonian ambassadors to Germany and the Netherlands.

The Macedonian government had spent €9,480,000 on lawyers and lobbying, court expenses and welcome-home parties for him and Boškoski. His wife had received €5,000 each month for eight years from the VMRO DPMNE-led government while he was imprisoned. The ultras group Komiti had supported him, as he was its leader. He was welcomed as a hero in Skopje by the Macedonian government, his family, leaders of VMRO-DPMNE and thousands of supporters, who saw him as a patriot. President Gjorge Ivanov and prime minister Nikola Gruevski welcomed him in their offices, perceiving him as a defender, regardless of the crimes he was imprisoned for. Per Balkan Insight, local ethnic Albanians were not happy about the celebrations for his return. Regarding his welcome, academic Biljana Vankovska stated: "In the context of the reconciliation process, this shows how far we are from it, that we have not even started it. Because if the majority of Macedonians perceive him as a hero, someone who was found by a court process to be responsible for the murder of civilians, and citizens of the Republic of Macedonia, let's not forget. That means we have learned very little from those lessons."

He later graduated from the Faculty of Agriculture at Goce Delčev University of Štip in agricultural engineering. Tarčulovski also became the owner of a company called "Mel-Kom trans Dooel", managed by his wife. Thus, he ended up earning millions of euros from the company. Tarčulovski became VMRO-DPMNE's organizational secretary. VMRO-DPMNE nominated him as a candidate in the parliamentary elections on December 11, 2016. A local political analyst said that his candidacy was an attempt by VMRO-DPMNE to win votes by exploiting patriotic sentiments. Per Balkan Insight, local ethnic Albanians were unhappy about this candidacy. He became a member of the parliament in 2016. The Ministry of Interior identified him as one of the five VMRO-DPMNE members who opened the doors to allow attackers to storm the parliament on April 27, 2017. He was later amnestied for this event. Tarčulovski was also a mayoral candidate for the Kisela Voda Municipality in the 2017 elections. His membership in the parliament ended in 2020. He has served as an advisor of the director of the Customs Administration.
