= Vizbegovo =

Vizbegovo Визбегово Vizbeg
- Neighbourhood
- Location in Butel Municipality

- Location within Republic of North Macedonia
- Coordinates: 42°02′N 21°25′E
- Country: North Macedonia
- Region: Skopje
- Municipality: Butel

Population (2002)
  - Total: 2,817
- Time zone: UTC+1 (CET)
  - Summer (DST): UTC+2 (CEST)
- Car plates: SK
- Website: .

Vizbegovo (Macedonian: Визбегово, Albanian: Vizbeg) is a neighbourhood in the municipality of Butel, North Macedonia. It used to be part of Čair Municipality. The Skopje Aqueduct archaeological site is located within the vicinity of the neighbourhood.

== Demographics ==
According to the 2021 census, the neighbourhood had a total of 3.748 inhabitants. Ethnic groups in the neighbourhood include:

- Albanians 2.672
- Macedonians 599
- Serbs 40
- Romani 88
- Bosniaks 28
- Vlachs 4
- Turks 56
- Others 261

Year	Macedonian	Albanian	Turks	Romani	Vlachs	Serbs	Bosniaks	Others	Total
2002	650	2.069	3	16	5	46	14	14	2.817
2021	599	2.672	56	88	4	40	28	261	3.748
