= Mi zaplakalo seloto Vataša =

Song
- Language: Macedonian
- Released: 1975
- Length: 4:44
- Songwriter: Lazar Mančevski-Pindžur

"Mi zaplakalo seloto Vataša" is a Macedonian song originally written and composed in the 1960s. Lazar Mančevski-Pindžur served as the songwriter. He got inspired by the Vataša massacre, that took place during World War II. The song was performed by several Macedonian folk and pop singers and music artists; the original was performed by Nikola Badev in 1975. Petranka Kostadinova, Blagoj Nacoski, Ani Malinkova, Katerina Taneva and Blaže Bogev also released their covers of the song.

"Mi zaplakalo seloto Vataša" became popular again in the 2020s. Macedonian singer Andrijana Janevska performed it live during Golden Ladybug of Popularity in 2023 together with the poem "Cvetovi" written by Macedonian poet Slavko Janevski and recited by Igor Džambazov in the company of the choir Mirče Acev. Her version of the song was also promoted through a studio recording and a music video as part of the project "Makedonijo vo srce te nosime" (English: "Macedonia We Bring You In Our Hearts"). The video shows excerpts of a documentary movie which features an interview with the mother of one of the killed young people. It also features pictures of dead young people from the massacre and a performance by Janevska and Igor Džambazov.

After the performance at Zlatna bubamara, the song was also performed at the 80th anniversary of the event. The performance of Janevska and Džambazov received praise from the press and the public.

== Background ==
=== Vataša massacre ===
A massacre happened on 16 June 1943 near the village Vataša, Kavadarci, as part of the occupation of Vardar Banovina, part of the Kingdom of Yugoslavia by the Axis powers during World War II in Yugoslav Macedonia. The shooting happened near Moklište, where the neighborhood of "Čair" is, in the vicinity of the village of Vataša. The murders were part of an anti-partisan offensive launched by the Bulgarian occupation authorities against the communist resistance and its helpers.

=== Conception and writing ===
Lazar Mančevski-Pindžur, who lived in the village of Vataša and was witness of the event was imprisoned by the local governing forces. During his serving of the conviction and after being released from prison, he collected materials to write the song "Mi zaplakalo seloto Vataša". According to a radio interview of the author, the process lasted five to ten years. Despite him, among the villagers there were also other witnesses who reported everything they saw on the day of the atrocity.

== Music covers ==
The first musical version of the song was recorded by Macedonian singer Nikola Badev in 1975. In honor of the 75th anniversary of the event, on 18 June 2018, the song was performed in Kavadarci. Since the day it was recorded onwards, the song is considered to be the "anthem of the village". In honor of the 100th anniversary of Badevs birth, professor Radica Kostadinova performed a cover of "Mi zaplakalo seloto Vataša" at Dom na kultura "Ivan Mazov-Klime" in Kavadarci on 27 October 2018.

In addition to Badev, a cover of the song was performed by other Macedonian singers. Petranka Kostadinova recorded her own version of the song in 1998. Her version lasts 5 minutes, 9 seconds. Her version was included on the album Makedonski folk pesni as well as one the first disc of the compilation album Makedonski patriotski pesni (25 July 1998) released by Mister Company. During her guest appearance on the show "Zajdi, zajdi" on Alfa Television on 2 September 2014, artist Ani Malinkova sang her own cover of the song. In 2015, there was an instrumental cover of the song by Dime Ivčev which was shared on the local portal of the city of Kavadarci, called Kavadarečki glas (English Kavadarci voice). Folk singer Blaže Bogev also performed the song on Televizija Alfa in 2014. In addition to him, a cover was also recorded by folk singer Katerina Taneva with her band Kate and Neli ti Rekov and published through YouTube. Opera singer Blagoj Nacoski, also covered the song and shared his video on his Facebook profile on 16 June 2019. A journalist from Vesnik.com portal, described his performance of the song as "maestral". As of 2023, the song became one of the most listened to songs in North Macedonia, on many radio stations.

=== Andrijana Janevska version ===
"Mi zaplakalo seloto Vataša"

Single by Andrijana Janevska
- Language: Macedonian
- Released: 15 August 2023
- Length: 7:11
- Songwriter: Lazar Mančevski-Pindžur
- Producer: Nikola Micevski

Andrijana Janevska singles chronology
"Kao ti" (2022)	"Mi zaplakalo seloto Vataša" (2023)	"Broken hearted me" (2023)

Music video
- "Mi zaplakalo seloto Vataša" on YouTube

"Mi zaplakalo seloto Vataša" was covered by Macedonian singer Andrijana Janevska in 2023. Janevska's version, contains the original lyrics and its composition is similar to Taneva's version. In June 2023, Janevska reported that Tanevska's performance during her guest appearance at maestro Zoran Džorlev was the way in which she learnt to sing the song. The cover and arrangement of the studio version of the song were finished by Nikola Micevski. During the interview, Janevska revealed that the idea to unite with Džambazov and cover the song came from Ranko bubamara, Radio bubamara organizer. She was later offered to be a part of the project "Makedonijo vo srce te nosime" which she accepted due to the view that more songs in Macedonian language should be listened to in the country. She saw this as a way of young people to "love, respect and listen to Macedonian music, especially original folk song since it is a part of our identity".

==== Music video ====
The music video for the song was released on 15 August 2023 in the production of Skenderovski Production Studio and directed by Bojana Skenderovska. It is a part of the music project of the house titled "Makedonijo vo srce te nosime", whose purpose was to "revive" 12 Macedonian patriotic songs from 12 different performers. In her announcement of her work on the video, Skenderovska reported that the work behind the production of the video was emotional, "We were crying while we were listening and while we were editing the video, on one of the many destinies of these people".

==== Live performances ====
The first live performances of the song was at the Golden Ladybug of Popularity in the middle of March in 2023 in which Janevska sang it accompanied by AKUD Choir Mirče Acev, orchestra and Igor Džambazov who recited the poem "Cvetovi" originally written by Slavko Janevski. The performance received praise from the audience and spectators, with Fokus reporting "a storm of emotions" in North Macedonia and the video was one of the most shared at the manifestation. Janevska reported that it was her first time to perform the song. She was dressed in a red dress as a symbol of "spilled child blood in Vataša". In a review for the Macedonian Ženski magazin, a journalist gave a positive review of the performance, saying "Andrijana's singing gave me goosebumps, together with the showman who knows how to put the entire pain that the song transfers and get you to the core and the Choir that completed the arrangement reminded us of the sad history through which our ancestors went through".

At the 80th commemoration of the event, on 15 and 16 June 2023, the singer performed the song at the municipality of Kavadarci. Performances occurred at two places – Svečena akademija at Dom na kultura "Ivan Mazov-Klime" in Kavadarci on 15 June and in front of the sculpture of the young ones on 16 June. This time, she was accompanied by Katerina Taneva, the choir "Mirče Acev" under the guidance of Jasmina Gjorgjeska, Damir Imeri band and Igor Džambazov. According to the singer herself, the entire team had only one rehearsal before the performance. The event was attended by the families of the killed children and also politicians, among which Hristijan Mickoski, Dimitar Apasiev and culture PM, Bisera Kostadinovska-Stojčevska who went to put fresh flowers on the grave. The performance was met with ovations by the audience. A journalist of Skopje1.mk called the performance "emotive" and wrote that "even this time they did not leave the audience indifferent after the performance of the song".

After the popularity of the performances, there was another performance during the manifestation titled "Tikveški grozdober 2023", on 8 September at City Square in Kavadarci.

==== Credits ====
Credits and personnel for the video are taken from the description of the official music video of the song "Mi zaplakalo seloto Vataša" performed by Andrijana Janevska and Igor Džambazov.

Song

- Cover and arrangement: Nikola Micevski
- Caval: Goce Dimovski
- Keyboards: Nikola Micevski
- Recital by poem "Cvetovi" by Slavko Janevski

Music video

- Video production: Skenderovski production -2023
- Direction: Bojana Skenderovski
- Producer: Vasko Skenderovski
- Direction: Skenderovski Production
- Photography director: Bojan Stoilkovski and Gjoko Milovski
- Color correction: Skenderovski Production
- Camera operator: Gjoko Milovski
- Light operator: Miki Stojkov
- Make-up: Viktorija Veljanovska
- PR: Aleksandra Sani Timkovska
- Graphic designer: Jelena Jančevska Mladenovska
