= Andrijana Janevska =

Macedonian Singer and Violinist (born 1981)

- Born: 6 December 1981 (age 44); Skopje, SFR Yugoslavia
- Genres: Pop, classical, Macedonian folk
- Occupations: Singer; violinist
- Years active: 1998–present
- Website: andrijana.com.mk

Andrijana Janevska (Macedonian: Андријана Јаневска; born 6 December 1981) is a Macedonian singer, violinist, and musician.

== Early life ==
Janevska was born in Skopje, North Macedonia, where she currently works and lives. She works as a violinist for the Macedonian National Opera. Apart from her musical talents, she also enjoys playing chess as a hobby. She is also proficient at playing the piano, and her first composition was created at the age of eleven. Andrijana began her studies at the School Centre for Music Education in Skopje at the age of six and recently finished her PhD at the Institute of Folklore in Skopje.

== Career ==
=== Early musical career ===
Janevska first attracted public interest when she participated in the 1998 SkopjeFest. The following October, she was voted the best newcomer at the annual Makfest festival in Stip. At the festival, she sang a sensual ballad called "Ne mozam da zaljubam po tebe" (Macedonian: Не мозам да заљубам по тебе, lit. 'I Can't Fall in Love After You'). Her festival awards did not end there, as she competed in the Macedonian festival Eurofest and achieved second place with the song "Da sum juzen vetar" (Macedonian: Да сум јузен ветар, lit. 'To Be a Southern Wind'). In February 2000, Janevska competed in SkopjeFest once again, with the intent of qualifying for the Eurovision Song Contest in Stockholm, Sweden. At the festival, she sang the well-received song "Tvoeto pismo, moja biblija" (Macedonian: Твоето писмо, моја Библија, lit. 'Your Letter, My Bible').

Janevska signed with the music label Abra Kadabra, after which she went to Cyprus to film the music video for her new single "Ljuboven ritam" (Macedonian: Ритамот на љубовта, lit. 'Love Rhythm') and to compete in the Montenegrin festival in Budva in 2000. Her contract with the label was terminated by mutual agreement, and Janevska joined Macedonian Radio Television while continuing the direction of the music videos with another production label. That summer, she spent her time in Australia as part of the Macedonian expedition to other continents. In October, Janevska participated in Makfest as part of a duet with Marjan Stojanovski for the song "Ljubov ti e adresa" (Macedonian: Љубов ти е адреса, lit. 'Love Is Your Address'). The song became a hit among the public, and with their votes it achieved first place. Afterwards, she filmed her music video with Stojanovski and returned to her first ambition of playing the violin.

With the song "Nostalgija" (Macedonian: Носталгија, lit. 'Nostalgia'), released in March 2001, Janevska earned first place from the public and the jury and won the SkopjeFest Grand Prix. Later in July, she took part in the Muf + Boban 2001 festival in Zrenjanin and began promotion for the new album Moja Biblija, which contained 12 new and old songs. Janevska also sang "Odovde do vechnosta" (Macedonian: Одовде до вечноста, lit. 'From Here to Eternity') with opera singer Blagoj Nacoski.

Janevska competed in the 2002 SkopjeFest, this time with the intent of qualifying for the Eurovision Song Contest in Tallinn, Estonia. Her song "O Cherie, Mon Cherie" was a strong favourite to win the competition, but both the audience and jury placed her second. She took a long break from the music scene afterwards.

=== Return ===
After two years of absence, Janevska returned to the Macedonian music scene in October 2004, participating in Makfest 2004. She competed with the rock song "Ostani" (Macedonian: Остани, lit. 'Stay'). In an interview that year, Janevska revealed that she was trying new music styles and focusing on rock music. At the end of 2004, Janevska participated in SkopjeFest with "Za Kraj" (Macedonian: За Крај, lit. 'For the End'), which was later released as a single with a music video. Janevska also announced that she would release a new album in the near future and that she already had songs prepared for promotion. In the summer of 2005, Janevska participated in Ohrid Fest with the song "Dojdi Bakni Me" (Macedonian: Дојди Бакни Ме, lit. 'Come and Kiss Me'), where she placed third overall. After that, Janevska continued her participation in Makfest 2005 with the song "Zvezda Vodilka" (Macedonian: Звезда Водилка, lit. 'Guiding Star').

In June 2006, Janevska released a reggae single titled "Den" (Macedonian: Ден, lit. 'Day'). At the Ohrid Festival that same year, she performed "Sonce" (Macedonian: Сонце, lit. 'Sun') during the Pop music night of Ohrid Fest on 25 August. Janevska earned enough points to proceed to the international evening, where she was successful despite not placing in the top three. Apart from competing, Janevska also promoted her upcoming album, also called Den. She also recorded a song with Eva Nedinkoska called "Tivka Nok" (Macedonian: Тивка Нок, lit. 'Quiet Night'), which was released along with a video clip. Janevska returned to Skopje Fest, which took place on 24 February 2007 and served as the national final of Macedonia for the Eurovision Song Contest.

In 2009, Janevska released an album of traditional Macedonian songs titled Prikazna za edno mome (Macedonian: Приказна за едно моме, lit. 'Story for One Girl'), produced by Mite Dimovski. The following year, in collaboration with MED Macedonia, she released the Christian Christmas album titled Dzvezdichka mala (Macedonian: Ѕвездичка мала, lit. 'Little Star'). In 2011, in another collaboration with Tanja Veda, Janevska released another children's CD album, Koga si srekjen (Macedonian: Кога си срекјен, lit. 'If You're Happy'), which contains 15 songs from the Anglosphere translated and sung in Macedonian.

=== Later career ===
Janevska was a full-time violin teacher for two years at the music school in Kumanovo, as well as for one year at the University of Audiovisual Arts European Film and Theatre Academy. For seven years, she has been teaching solfeggio, music theory, vocals, and piano at Enterprajz Music School, and since 2003 Janevska has been an active member of the women's chamber choir "St. Zlata Meglenska". Janevska is a professor in the music department at the Faculty of Music Arts in Skopje, as well as a composer. Although she has written many of the songs she sings, she also sings works by other composers.

In 2014, Janevska performed at the World Choir Competition in Riga, winning two gold and one silver medal with the St. Zlata Meglenska Choir. Their choir, the only one from Macedonia, was among 570 competing international singing groups.

In 2023, Janevska provided vocals for the song "Feast of Jerrod" on the soundtrack of Mortal Kombat 1, composed by Wilbert Roget II. In late 2023, she was approached by Macedonian broadcaster MRT to represent North Macedonia in the Eurovision Song Contest 2024 upon its planned return to the contest, but declined the opportunity; the country's return would not end up materialising.

== Personal life ==
Janevska married the guitarist of the band Archangel, Dragan Ginovski Gino, whom she had been dating for four years. The couple has two sons, born in 2011 and 2014.

== Discography ==
=== Albums ===
- Moja Biblija – 2001
- Den – 2006
- Makedonski Rozi (Etno with MITAN) – 2008
- Prikazna za edno mome (Etno with MITAN) – 2009
- Dzvezdichka mala (Christian songs) – 2010
- Koga si srekjen (Children's songs) – 2011
- Patuvanje na polnokj (Etno with MITAN) – 2013
- Zaspivalki (Children's lullabies) – 2015
- Slusni, pej, igraj (Traditional children's songs) – 2017
- Bog i jas – 2017
- Atisarga (feat. Bostjan Leben) – 2019

=== Singles ===
- "Te sakam beskrajno" (duet with Pece Ognenov) – 1998
- "Dovolno silna" – 1998
- "Eden den" – 1999
- "Sé shto baram nokjva" – 1999
- "Ne mozam da zaljubam po tebe" – 1999
- "Da sum juzen vetar" – 1999
- "Tvoeto pismo, moja biblija" – 2000
- "Ljuboven ritam" – 2000
- "Ljubov ti e adresa" (duet with Marjan Stojanovski) – 2000
- "Za tebe" – 2000
- "Nostalgija" – 2001
- "Od ovde do vechnosta" (duet with Blagoj Nacoski) – 2001
- "Den po den" (duet with Vrchak) – 2001
- "Svoja na svoeto" – 2001
- "O Cherie, Mon Cherie" – 2002
- "Ostani" – 2004
- "Za Kraj" – 2005
- "Dojdi Bakni Me" – 2005
- "Dzvezda Vodilka" – 2005
- "Den" – 2006
- "Sonce" – 2006
- "Epizoda" – 2007
- "Tivka nokj" (duet with Tanja Stankovic Dimovska) – 2007
- "Tivka Nokj" (duet with Eva) – 2007
- "Zrno" – 2008
- "Zaminuvam" – 2008
- "Vo pogreshno vreme" – 2008
- "Drvo bez koren" – 2009
- "20 leta Makedonijo" – 2011
- "Mozhebi" – 2012
- "Zhivotot e ubav" – 2013
- "Ako me sakash" (ft. Infinitas) – 2013
- "Shto e toa" – 2013
- "Kazna" – 2014
- "Eden den" (duet with Myatta) – 2014
- "Mi zaplakalo seloto Vataša" – 2023
- "Broken Hearted Me" (Zada Records) – 2023
- "I bez tebe mozham" – Makfest 2023
- "Creep" (Zada Records) – 2024
- "Mortal Kombat 1 Soundtrack | Feast of Jerrod" – 2024
- "Ne bidi toj" – 2025

== See also ==
- Music of North Macedonia
