= Vataša massacre =

1943 massacre in Yugoslav Macedonia

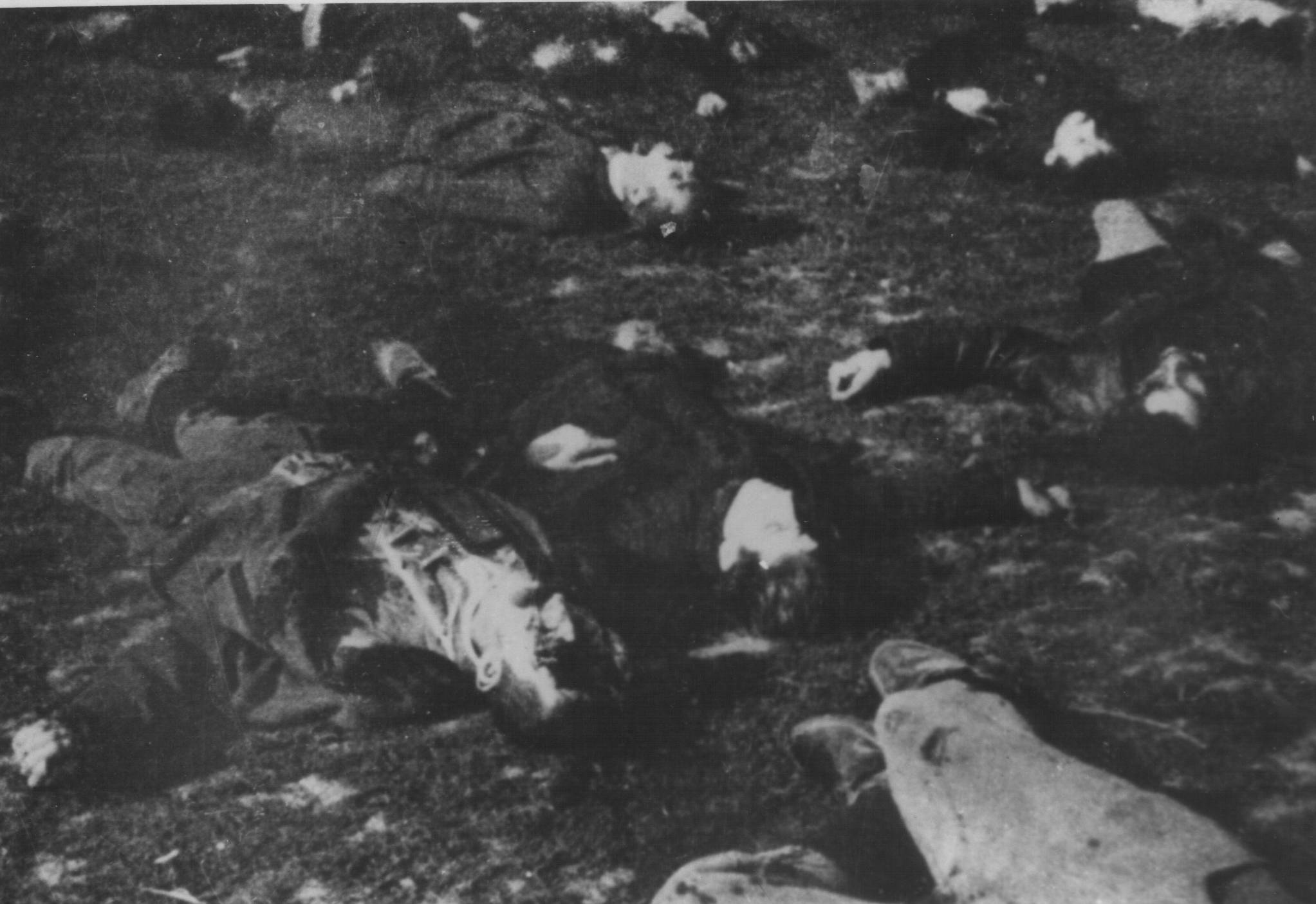
Bodies of the victims

A massacre of 12 young people happened on 16 June 1943 near the village Vataša, Kavadarci, as part of the occupation of Vardar Banovina, part of the Kingdom of Yugoslavia by the Axis powers during World War II in Yugoslav Macedonia. The shooting happened near Moklište, where the neighborhood of "Čair" is, in the vicinity of the village of Vataša. The murders were part of an anti-partisan offensive launched by the Bulgarian occupation authorities against the communist resistance and its helpers.

== History ==
=== Act ===
The massacre was performed by the Bulgarian army and police forces led by captain Boris Zheglov, lieutenant Boris Kostov and the police officer Petko Oprekov under the command of Lyuben Apostolov, commander of 56. Veles infantry regiment from the Fifth Bulgarian Army. Apostolov was a local from Kriva Palanka. The principal of the local high school in Kavadarci, Ivan Iliev (IMRO), a former voivode of the Internal Macedonian Revolutionary Organization, participated in the action too. There was a talk in Vataša there were young people who had come into contact with the Macedonian partisans and were preparing to join them. In this regard, some locals loyal to the authorities prepared a list with the names of the involved. The operation to arrest the partisans' helpers was carried out on the morning of 16 June. During their interrogations, the rustic teacher, who was from Bulgaria, tried to exonerate the youths, but was removed.

The young men were subsequently taken out of the village and shot. They were between the ages of 18 and 28, while one boy was 15 years old. Their names are Vančo Gurev (19 years), Ilčo Dimov (18 years), Panče Meškov (18 years), Danko Dafkov (18 years), Gerasim Metakov (18 years), Risto Gjondev (18 years), Pero Videv (15 years), Dime Čekorov (20 years), Vaso Hadžijordanov (28 years), Ferčo Pop Gjorgjiev (26 years), Pane Džunov (18 years) and Blaže Icev (20 years). Four girls who were also arrested, were set free later. According to the then Tarnovo Constitution, most of the dead were minors, since adulthood was attained upon reaching the age of 21. Persons under the age of 21 were not subject to the death penalty.

=== Aftermath ===
The event led to anger among the local population. As a result, at the end of June 1943, the mayor of Skopje Spiro Kitinchev and the journalist Danail Krapchev, both local cadres, were sent to the village. They understood the main role in initiating this incident was of the deputy district governor Krum Kamchev, also a local. Subsequently Kitinchev went to Sofia and exposed there what a "mistake" had happened. However, the only consequence remained that Kamchev was moved from Kavadarci in a local village. After the war, the leader of the action, Colonel Apostolov, was handed over by the new Bulgarian authorities in Skopje. Before the court in Kavadarci, he pleaded not guilty. According to him, he had information that the young men and women had been captured armed in the forest. Per the orders in force in the army at that time, the Geneva Convention on Prisoners of War did not apply to them and they were to be shot immediately. Apostolov was sentenced to death and shot. The other officers and non-commissioned officers who took part in the action, D. Raev, B. Zheglov, A. Bogdanov, B. Kostov and P. Oprekov, were also sentenced to death. Kitinchev, Krapchev and Iliev were also liquidated by the new communist authorities in Yugoslavia and Bulgaria.

== Legacy ==
In the first post-war decades, the massacre was described in Yugoslavia rather as a result of a political and ideological conflict. After the aggravation of Bulgarian-Macedonian relations in the last decades, these events have been described in North Macedonia as an ethnonational conflict between "Bulgarian fascists" and "ethnic Macedonians". This interpretation is disputed in Bulgaria, where it is claimed that the event was a personal mistake of Apostolov, and that there was no fascist regime in Bulgaria. Also, the Bulgarian authorities considered the Macedonian Slavs during WWII as Bulgarians, while local personnel was largely involved in this massacre, including half of the soldiers, as well as policemen and commanding officers. These facts have been hidden in North Macedonia. In comparison, when in June 1913, the residents of Vataša took part in the Tikveš Uprising, the Serbian troops killed around 1,000 people in that area, including 49 in Vataša, but this is not given much attention in North Macedonia. As an example of the lack of ethnic motivation in the massacre, the Bulgarian side points to the Yastrebino massacre, which took place on 20 December 1943 in Antonovo Municipality. The Bulgarian police and army killed 18 civilians, 6 of whom were small children, with the pretext for this being also hiding communist partisans.

A song dedicated to the youths, called Mi zaplakalo seloto Vataša, was written by Lazar Mančevski-Pindžur. On 11 October 1961, a monument (made by Jordan Grabulovski) in honor of the youths was revealed in Moklište, where the youths have been buried. A small monument is at the site of the massacre. In honor of the killed youths, there is a sculpture in the village. In addition, during the 80th anniversary of the event, in June 2023, there were 12 busts of the youth and there was the solemn opening of the Room of Memory, which contains personal objects and photos of the youth.

== See also ==
- List of massacres in North Macedonia
- Historiography in North Macedonia
- 1951 killing of five students from Strumica
