= Radišani =

- Радишани
- Location in Butel Municipality

- Location within Republic of North Macedonia
- Coordinates: 42°04′N 21°27′E
- Country: North Macedonia
- Region: Skopje
- Municipality: Butel

Population (2021)
  - Total: 6,066
- Time zone: UTC+1 (CET)
  - Summer (DST): UTC+2 (CEST)
- Car plates: SK
- Website: .

Radišani (Macedonian: Радишани) is a settlement in the municipality of Butel, North Macedonia. It is also known as a village / "Skopjansko selo" and it used to be part of Čair Municipality.

In statistics gathered by Vasil Kanchov in 1900 showed that 140 Christian Bulgarians and 50 Muslim Albanians inhabited Radišani.

According to the 2021 census, the settlement had a total of 6,066 inhabitants. Ethnic groups in the village include:

- Macedonians 4.904
- Serbs 204
- Albanians 216
- Romani 138
- Vlachs 12
- Bosniaks 103
- Turks 27
- Others 462

Year	Macedonian	Albanian	Turks	Romani	Vlachs	Serbs	Bosniaks	Others	Total
2002	8.084		35	160	52	363	49	180	9.123
2021	4.904	216	27	138	12	204	103	462	6.066
