= Ljuboten incident =

2001 attacks in Macedonia

- Part of 2001 insurgency in Macedonia
Date	Clashes: 10 August 2001; Massacre: 12 August 2001
Location	Ljuboten, Macedonia

Belligerents
National Liberation Army (initial attack denied by Ali Ahmeti)	Macedonia

Commanders and leaders
Muzafer Agushi †	Johan Tarčulovski

Units involved
113th Brigade "Ismet Jashari"	Macedonian Army; Macedonian Army Reservists; Macedonian Police

Strength
Unknown	Unknown 60-70 reserve policemen

Casualties and losses
1 militant killed	8 reservists killed 6 reservists injured
- 10 ethnic Albanian civilians killed Around 150 ethnic Albanians injured Hundreds of ethnic Albanians arrested 14 ethnic Albanian homes burned

The Ljuboten incident, also known as Ljubotenski Bacila massacre (Macedonian: Масакрот на Љуботенски Бачила, Masakrot na Ljubotenski Bačila) and Luboten massacre, happened in early August 2001, when eight soldiers were killed after a Macedonian Army truck convoy composed of reservists ran over a landmine near the village of Ljuboten and a police operation was led in the village by Johan Tarčulovski afterwards. Tarčulovski was convicted for war crimes by the International Criminal Tribunal for the former Yugoslavia (ICTY) in 2008.

== Background ==
On 10 August 2001, eight Macedonian soldiers were killed in a landmine explosion when a convoy of army trucks ran over three landmines, which occurred on the road between the villages of Ljubanci and Ljuboten. Six soldiers were injured in the explosion. Immediately after the attack, fighting between Albanian rebels and Macedonian forces erupted. The Macedonian government officially blamed the NLA for the attack. The leader of the NLA, Ali Ahmeti, did not confirm NLA involvement in planting the mines, suggested the devices might have been placed by government forces to prevent rebel crossings, and expressed his regret at the incident.

== Massacre ==
Luboten massacre
- Location: Ljuboten, Macedonia
- Date: 12 August 2001
- Target: Albanian civilians
- Attack type: Raid, massacre, arson
- Deaths: 10 killed
- Injuries: Around 150 injured
- Victim: Hundreds arrested
- Perpetrator: Macedonian Police led by Johan Tarčulovski
- No. of participants: 60-70 reserve policemen
- Motive: Revenge for the killing of 8 reservists which were killed by a NLA planted mine
- Verdict: Guilty
- Convictions: War crimes (murder, wanton destruction and cruel treatment)
- Convicted: 1

The Macedonian Army shelled Ljuboten with helicopters and heavy artillery, and during the shelling two Albanian civilians, one elderly man and a 6-year-old boy were killed. Following the shelling, on 12 August, Macedonian reservists entered the village. 60-70 reserve policemen, along with men from a private security agency named "Kometa", were involved under the command of Johan Tarčulovski. They killed six individuals, shooting them either in the head or the back, including a 6-year-old boy. Later one man was stabbed to death in the presence of his paralyzed father. 14 houses were burned and more than 100 people were arrested. Many of them were abused by the police. Around 150 ethnic Albanians were injured in an encounter with the police. On 12 August, a small faction of NLA fighters led by Muzafer Agushi deserted from the NLA to return to Ljuboten. Their primary objective was to rescue wounded civilians in the village amid the ongoing massacre. Agushi lost his life on that very day. Ten Albanian civilians were killed in total.

== Aftermath ==
The body of a missing 35-year-old man from Ljuboten was found by his relatives at the morgue in Skopje, six days after the incident. Investigations by local and international human rights groups concluded that no combatants were present in the village during the police operation, as well as confirming that ethnic Albanian villagers were beaten and killed.

The International Criminal Tribunal for the former Yugoslavia (ICTY) at The Hague indicted Ljube Boškoski, Minister of Interior of Macedonia, and Johan Tarčulovski, a police officer, for war crimes in Ljuboten. In 2008, Boškoski was acquitted as the ICTY found no evidence that he was aware about the crimes committed by the police under Tarčulovski and concluded that he was not obligated to investigate. Tarčulovski was found guilty of the murder of three Albanian civilians, wanton destruction of 12 houses or other property, and the cruel treatment of 13 ethnic Albanian civilians, and sentenced to 12 years in prison. It was the only ICTY case related to war crimes in Macedonia.

Regarding the police operation, historian Mark Biondich wrote: "The Ljuboten incident, despite its brutality, was not part of an official policy of ethnic cleansing." The family of a victim in Ljuboten filed a lawsuit against Tarčulovski in 2017, wanting €1,000,000 as compensation.
