= United for Macedonia =

Conservative political party in North Macedonia

United for Macedonia Обединети за Македонија
- President: Ljube Boškoski
- Founded: May 29, 2009
- Headquarters: Skopje
- Youth wing: United Youth for Macedonia
- Ideology: Conservatism; Anti-communism; Economic liberalism Pro-Europeanism
- Political position: Centre-right
- National affiliation: Coalition of Your Macedonia
- Colours: Yellow, black, blue

Website
- om.org.mk

United for Macedonia (Macedonian: Обединети за Македонија, romanized: Obedineti za Makedonija) is a political party in North Macedonia. It was founded by Ljube Boškoski, a former interior minister and former member of the conservative VMRO-DPMNE.

== History ==
After having been acquitted of all charges against him at the International Criminal Tribunal for the former Yugoslavia, Ljube Boškoski returned to Macedonia on 11 July 2008. After disagreements with the new leadership of his party, VMRO-DPMNE, he decided to participate in the 2009 presidential elections as an independent candidate and at the end of May 2009 formed his own party, United for Macedonia.

In the 2011 parliamentary elections, United for Macedonia won 17,081 votes, but did not win a single seat. Then the party entered into a coalition with VMRO-NP and Dignity under the name "VMRO for Macedonia" and won roughly 25,000 votes in the 2016 parliamentary elections, but again did not win a parliamentary seat.

In the 2020 parliamentary elections, United for Macedonia is in the broad coalition We can and is part of the government.

In the 2024 parliamentary elections, United for Macedonia is in the broad coalition with VMRO-DPMNE for Your Macedonia.

President of the Youth organization United Youth for Macedonia is Gjorgji Stankovski.

== Ideology ==
According to the party itself, its ideology is European, progressive, center-right, people's party, because it accepts European standards and sees the future of North Macedonia in Europe and the party in the family of center-right, conservative parties. The party cooperates with the European Conservatives and Reformists Party.
