= Butel =

Butel Бутел
- Neighbourhood
- Location in Butel Municipality

- Location within Republic of North Macedonia
- Coordinates: 42°02′N 21°27′E
- Country: North Macedonia
- Region: Skopje
- Municipality: Butel

Population (2021)
  - Total: 24,391
- Time zone: UTC+1:00 (CET)
  - Summer (DST): UTC+2:00 (CEST)
- Car plates: SK
- Website: .

Butel (Macedonian: Бутел, Albanian: Butel) is a neighbourhood in the city of Skopje, North Macedonia, and the seat of Butel Municipality.

== Demographics ==
According to the 2021 census, the town had a total of 24.391 inhabitants. Ethnic groups in the town include:

Year	Macedonian	Albanian	Turks	Romani	Vlachs	Serbs	Bosniaks	Others	Persons for whom data are taken from administrative sources	Total
2002	7,616	4,846	450	104	27	377	406	179		14,005
2021	10,451	8,646	1,229	258	56	353	1,002	402	1,994	24,391

In the aftermath of the 2001 insurgency some Macedonians from Čair moved to other Skopje urban areas such as nearby Butel. The neighborhood has a mixed population that includes minorities of Romani and Turks, yet Butel is associated with Albanians in North Macedonia.
