= Skopje Aqueduct =

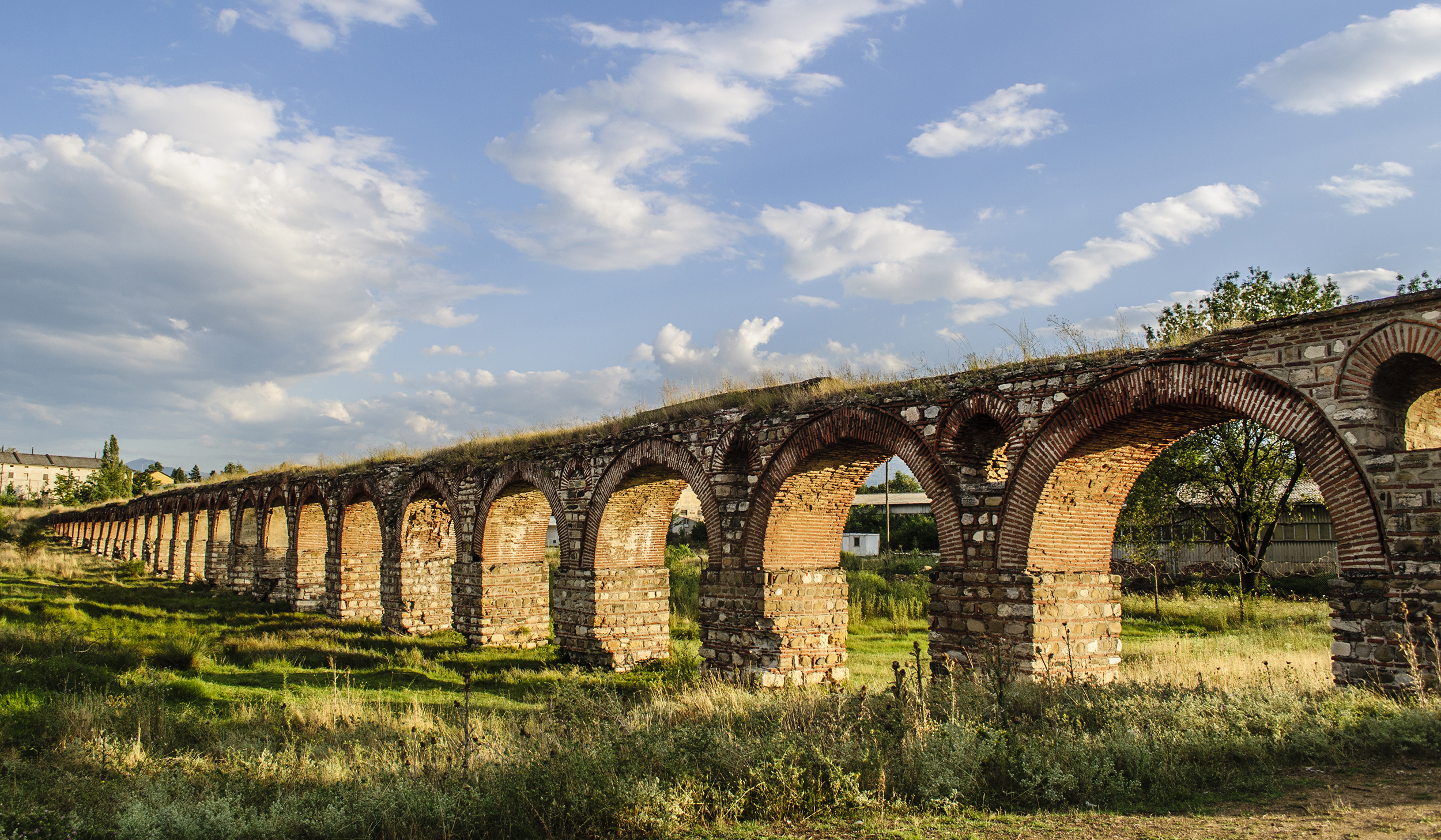
- Coordinates: 42°01.411′N 021°25.124′E
- Carries: Skopje Aqueduct
- Locale: Vizbegovo near Skopje, North Macedonia

Characteristics
- Material: Brick, stone
- Total length: 386 m (1,266 ft)
- Height: 16.5 m (54 ft)

History
- Construction end: reign of Justinian I (527 – 565) or during the reign of Ottomans (16th century)

Location
- Interactive map of Skopje Aqueduct

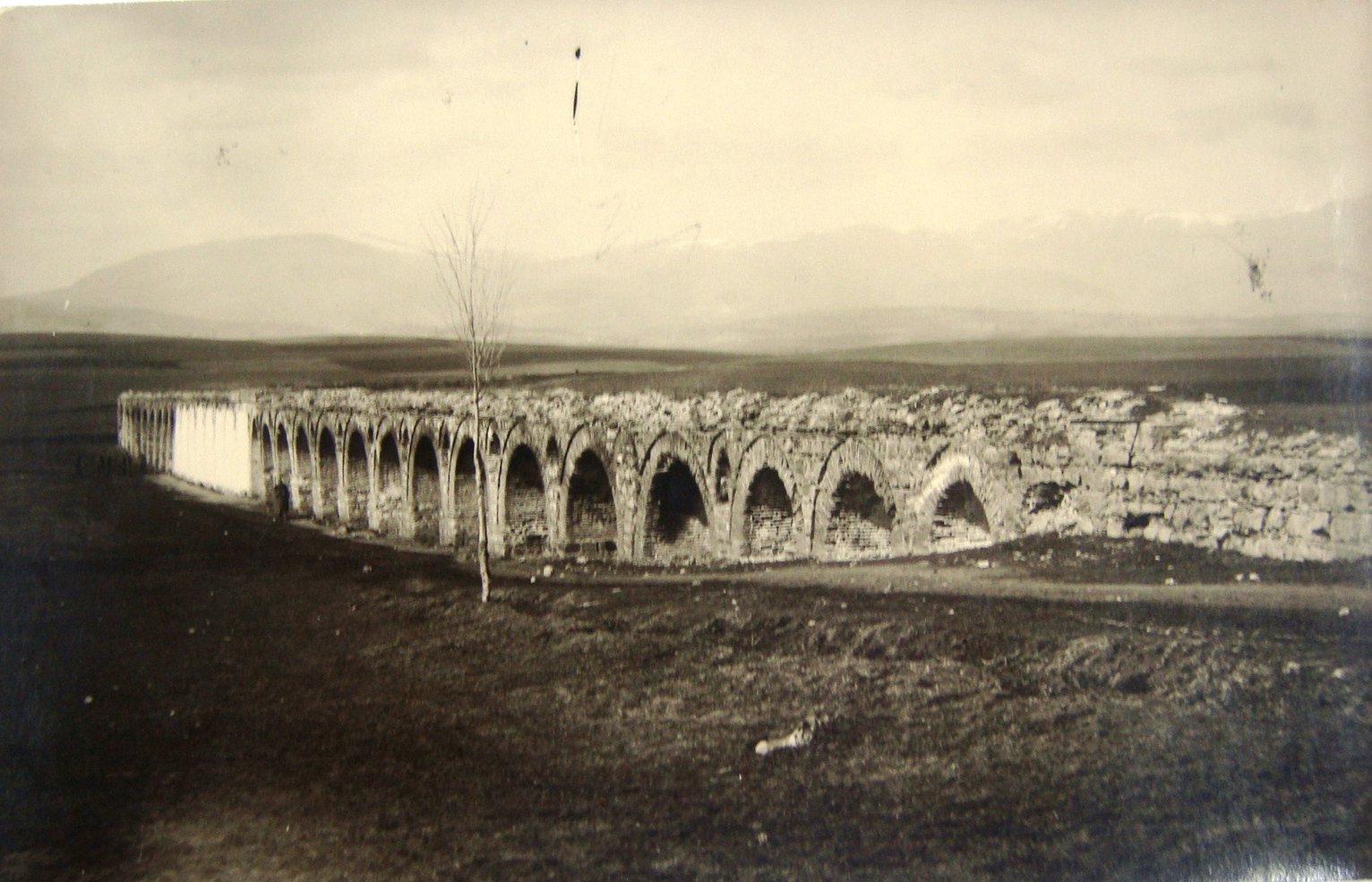
Historical images of Skopje: Аqueduct.

The Skopje Aqueduct (Macedonian: Скопски аквадукт, romanized: Skopski akvadukt) is an aqueduct and archaeological site located in the neighbourhood of Vizbegovo, 2 km (1.2 mi) northwest of central Skopje, North Macedonia. The Skopje Aqueduct is the only aqueduct in Macedonia, and one of three largest and well preserved in the former Yugoslavia along with Diocletianus Aqueduct near Split, Croatia and Bar Aqueduct in Montenegro.

== History ==
The question of when the Skopje Aqueduct was built is unclear. There are three theories:

- during the reign of Rome (1st century); according to this theory the aqueduct fed water to Legionary settlement Scupi.
- during the reign of Byzantine Empire (reign of Emperor Justinian I); according to this theory, the aqueduct shipped water to the new settlement Justiniana Prima.
- during the reign of Ottoman Empire; according to this theory the aqueduct was built in the 16th century for the many Turkish public hamams.

This aqueduct was in use until the eighteenth century. Only about 386 meters (1,266 ft) with 55 arches of this structure of stone and brick remain. It is assumed that the aqueduct took water from the spring Lavovec (village Gluvo on mountain Skopska Crna Gora), 9 kilometers (5.6 mi) northwest from Skopje and brought water to city center.

The first phase of restoration work on the Skopje Aqueduct began in September 2021 and completed in early 2023, with the second phase beginning afterward.

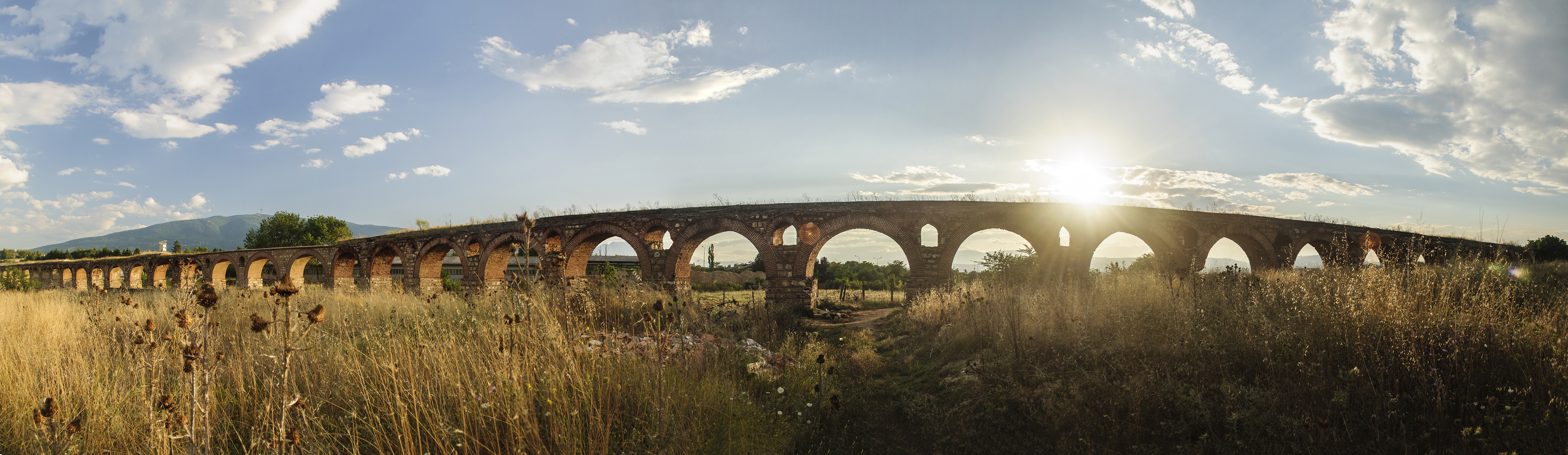
Panorama of the Skopje Aqueduct

== See also ==
- List of aqueducts in the Roman Empire
- List of Roman aqueducts by date
- Ancient Roman technology
- Roman engineering

== Bibliography ==
- (in Macedonian) Petrov K, «Akvedukt kraj Skopje i problemot na negovata datiranje», Godisen Zbornik na Filozofski Fakultet, 13 (1962).
