= 2009 Macedonian presidential election =

- 22 March 2009 (first round); 5 April 2009 (second round)
- Turnout: 56.88% (first round); 42.63% (second round)
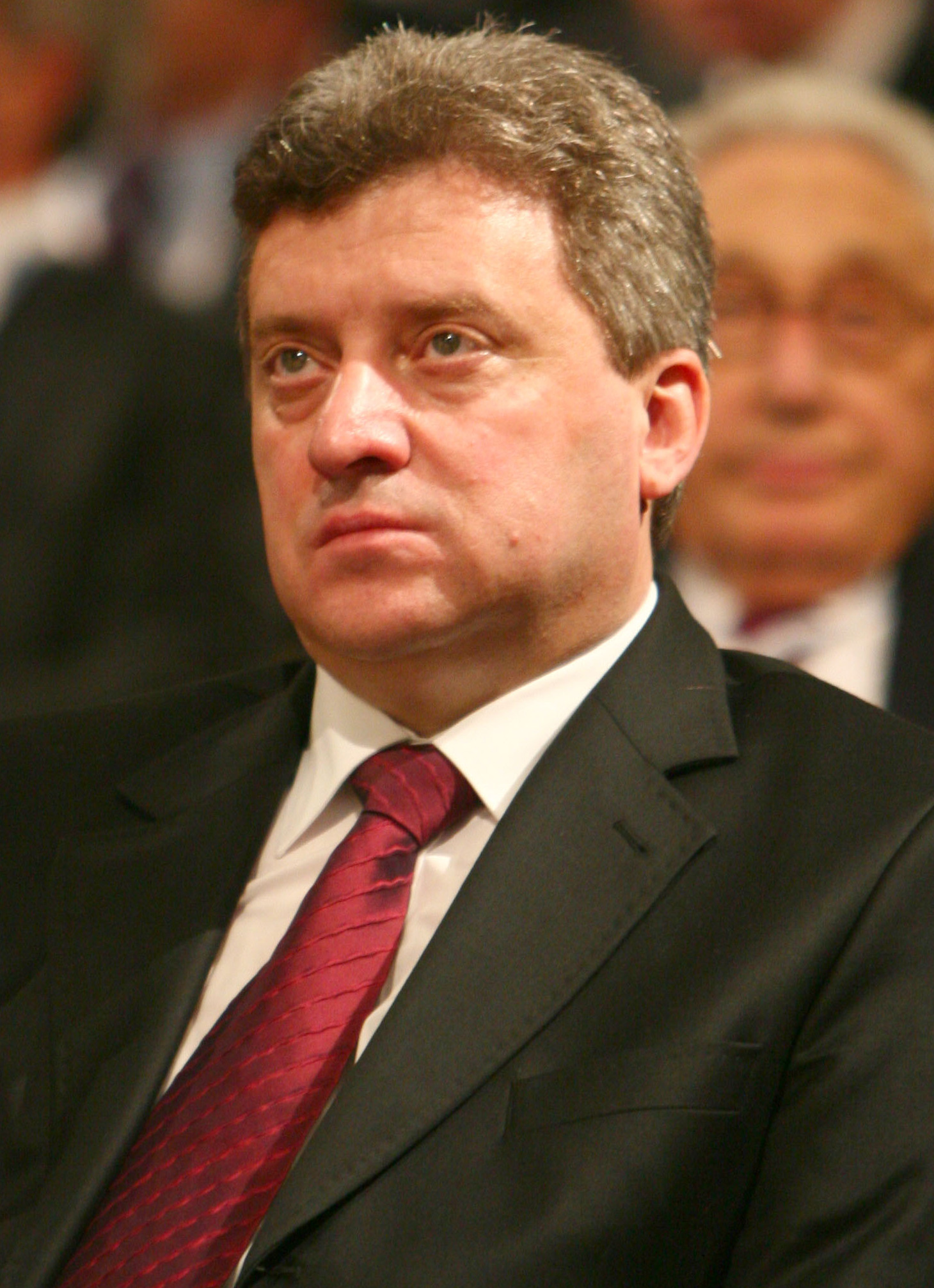

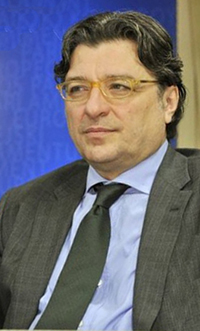
Nominee	Gjorge Ivanov	Ljubomir Frčkoski
Party	VMRO-DPMNE	SDSM
Popular vote	453,616	264,828
Percentage	63.14%	36.86%
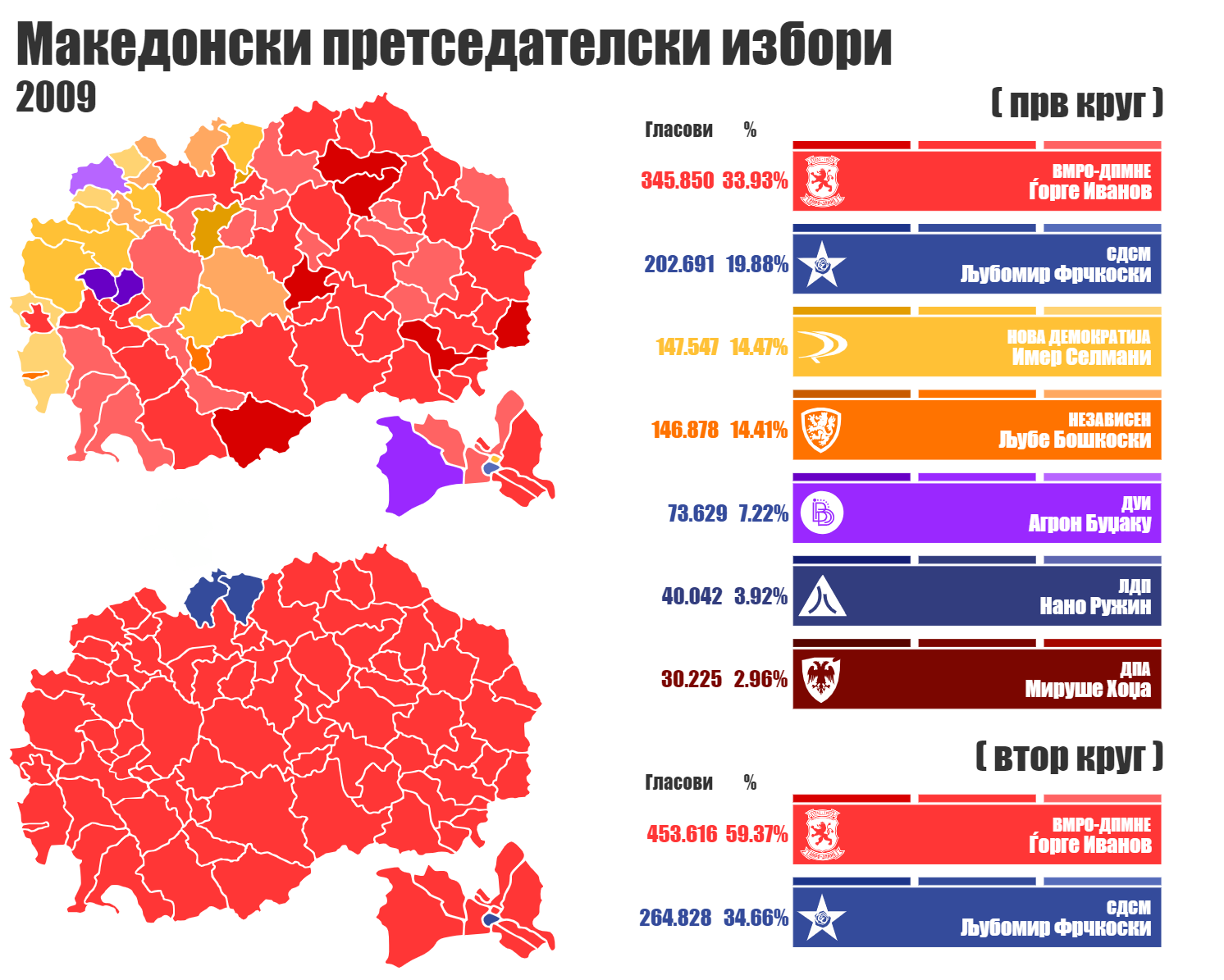
President before election
Branko Crvenkovski
SDSM
Elected President
Gjorge Ivanov
VMRO-DPMNE

Presidential elections were held in Macedonia in 2009. The first round was held on 22 March, alongside local elections. As no candidate received more than 50% of the vote, a run-off round was held on 5 April 2009, which was won by Gjorge Ivanov of the center-right VMRO-DPMNE party. Incumbent President Branko Crvenkovski did not stand for re-election.

== Electoral system ==
The elections were held using the two-round system; a candidate required a majority of the vote in the first round of voting, with a second round held if no candidate crossed the threshold. There was also a requirement for voter turnout in the second round to be at least 40% to validate the result.

== Candidates ==
On 25 January 2009, the largest party in the Macedonian parliament, VMRO-DPMNE, appointed Gjorge Ivanov as the party's presidential candidate. On 26 January 2009, the biggest opposition party in the country, the Social Democratic Union of Macedonia, proposed the former Minister of Internal Affairs and former Minister of Foreign Affairs Ljubomir Frčkoski for presidential candidate. The other candidates were the independent Ljube Boškoski, New Democracy leader Imer Selmani, Nano Ružin from the Liberal Democratic Party, Agron Buxhaku of the Democratic Union for Integration and Mirushe Hoxha of the Democratic Party of Albanians, the only female candidate.

== Opinion polls ==
There was a poll held in January 2009, before any names of candidates for president were made official, according to which 31.2% of the Macedonian citizens would vote for the candidate to be proposed by conservative party VMRO-DPMNE while 11.4% would give their vote to the candidate of the Social Democratic Union of Macedonia.

A poll from February 2009 saw Ivanov at 27%, Frčkoski at 13%, Boškoski at 10%, Selmani at 9% and other candidates together at 18%. In a run-off, Ivanov would win over Frčkoski with 36% to 21%, with a large number of undecideds, however. A poll from shortly before the election saw Ivanov leading with 23.1% before Selmani with 13.3% and Frčkoski at 9.7%; 23.9% were undecided.

A new poll, that was held one week prior to the run-off, saw Ivanov in lead with 25.4% and Frčkoski at 13.8% (that is, 69% to 31% of decided voters).

== Conduct ==
Nearly 7,000 Macedonian and 500 foreign observers monitored the vote at Macedonia's nearly 3,000 polling stations. A fair and democratic election has been seen as an important factor for Macedonia's induction to NATO and the European Union.

== Results ==
In the first round, Ivanov strongly led in front of the other candidates with 35%, with Frčkoski getting 20% and coming in second place and advancing to the run-off. New Democracy's Imer Selmani, who had been dubbed the "Macedonian Obama" for his ability to transcend the ethnic boundaries and appeal to ethnically Macedonian voters, as well, was by far the most successful candidate, gaining 15% of the vote and coming in third place, slightly ahead of the independent Boškoski. 103 voting stations could not open due to heavy snowfall; voting was to be rescheduled there.

Some days before the second round of the elections took place, VMRO-DPMNE and the Democratic Union for Integration agreed on supporting each other on both, the local and presidential elections.

In part due to the existence of many voters in the registers who have left Macedonia years ago and live abroad, and in part due to the lack of motivation for ethnic Albanians to participate in the second round, there were fears that the minimum turnout of 40% might not be met in the second round, invalidating the election.

There was a significant number of invalid ballots in both rounds, 3.15% in the first round and even 5.87% in the runoff. According to media reports, this was due to voter apathy and disenchantment with the candidates. It is reported that there was a Facebook group "Vote for Chuck Norris" with thousands of fans. It was also reported that on thousands of ballots names like "Chuck Norris", "GOD", "Jimi Hendrix" or "George Bush" were hand-written by the voters.

Candidate	Party	First round		Second round	
Candidate	Party	Votes	%	Votes	%
Gjorge Ivanov	VMRO-DPMNE	345,850	35.05	453,616	63.14
Ljubomir Frčkoski	Social Democratic Union of Macedonia	202,691	20.54	264,828	36.86
Imer Selmani	New Democracy	147,547	14.95		
Ljube Boškoski	Independent	146,878	14.88		
Agron Buxhaku	Democratic Union for Integration	73,629	7.46		
Nano Ružin	Liberal Democratic Party	40,042	4.06		
Mirushe Hoxha	Democratic Party of Albanians	30,225	3.06		
Total		986,862	100.00	718,444	100.00
Valid votes		986,862	96.82	718,444	94.03
Invalid/blank votes		32,406	3.18	45,595	5.97
Total votes		1,019,268	100.00	764,039	100.00
Registered voters/turnout		1,792,082	56.88	1,792,082	42.63
Source: SEC, SEC
