= Čelopek, Brvenica =

Čelopek Челопек Çellopek
- Village
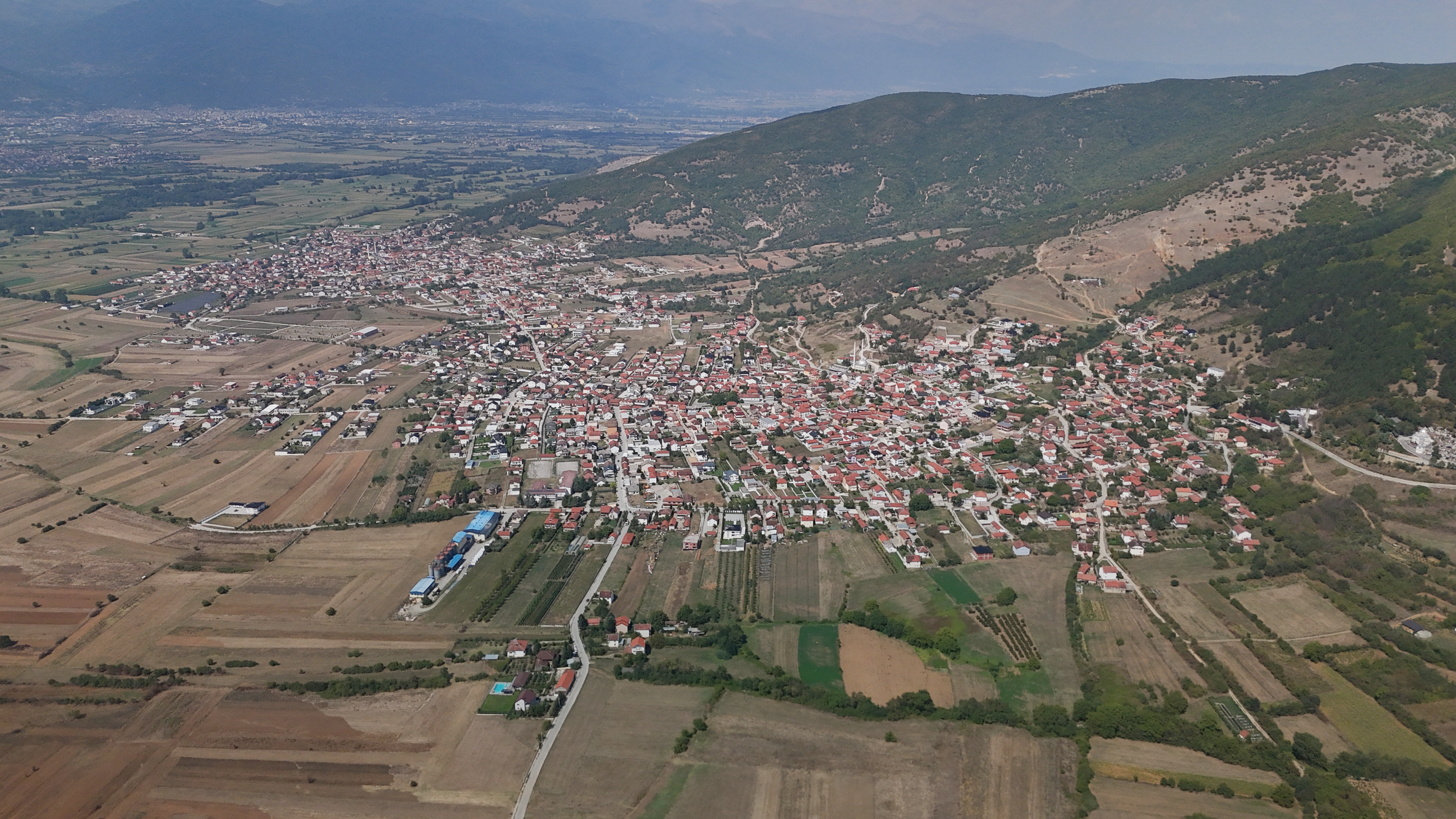
- Air view of the village

- Location within North Macedonia
- Coordinates: 41°55′54″N 21°00′47″E
- Country: North Macedonia
- Region: Polog
- Municipality: Brvenica

Population (2021)
  - Total: 4,459
- Time zone: UTC+1 (CET)
  - Summer (DST): UTC+2 (CEST)
- Car plates: TE
- Website: .

Čelopek (Macedonian: Челопек, Albanian: Çellopek) is a village in the municipality of Brvenica, North Macedonia.

== History ==
=== medieval history ===
Čelopek is attested in the 1467/68 Ottoman tax registry (defter) for the Nahiyah of Kalkandelen. The village had a total of 121 Christian Albanian and Slavic households, 17 bachelors and 9 widows.

=== 20th-century history ===
In statistics gathered by Vasil Kanchov in 1900, the village of Čelopek (Chelopeki) was inhabited by 1,000 Muslim Albanians and 520 Christian Macedonians.

According to the 1942 Albanian census, Čelopek was inhabited by 1,858 Muslim Albanians, 100 Serbs and 710 Macedonians.

== Demographics ==
The sufferings of the beautiful princess
Exceprt from a story told by an old woman from Čelopek in the native Lower Polog dialect

As of the 2021 census, Čelopek had 4,459 residents with the following ethnic composition:

- Albanians 3,898
- Macedonians 395
- Persons for whom data are taken from administrative sources 157
- Others 9

According to the 2002 census, the village had a total of 5,287 inhabitants. Ethnic groups in the village included:

- Albanians – 4,803
- Macedonians – 463
- Turks – 2
- Serbs – 1
- Others – 18

== Notable people ==
- Ljube Boškoski - former Minister of Internal Affairs of the Republic of Macedonia
