= Nano Ružin =

Nano Ružin Ambassador of the Republic of Macedonia to NATO
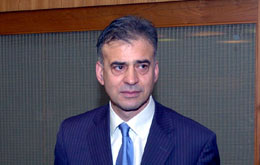
- In office 1 May 2001 – 9 April 2008

Nano Ružin (Macedonian Cyrillic: Нано Ружин, born 31 July 1952 in Skopje) is a Macedonian professor of political and social sciences, Ex-Macedonian Ambassador to NATO, and was the presidential candidate of the Liberal Democratic Party (LDP) for the Macedonian presidential election in 2009, the first round of which took place on 22 March 2009.

== Biography ==
Nano Ružin was born to parents Gligor Ružin (1917-1967) and Stana Ružin (1921-2013). He has two elder brothers Risto (1943-1986) and Gjorge (1946-2002). The family originated from the Mijaks group of people from the region of Debar - Galičnik. The name of the family comes from a famous and prominent lady of the Mijaks, Baba Ruža.

Nano lived his childhood in Valandovo from 1952 to 1959. He then went to Skopje where he witnessed the 1963 Skopje earthquake. He was in luck because several buildings near the place where he lived at the time were destroyed by the magnitude of the disaster. Being the youngest of three brothers he was always sympathized by his parents and life was hard for young Nano who decided to study abroad in Belgrade in 1971.

Ružin then graduated at the Faculty of Political Sciences at the Belgrade University in 1975. And finished his Post-Graduate studies at the Faculty of Political Sciences in Zagreb 1982. Before he graduated in Zagreb, Nano spent 1 year of preparations in Paris at the Sorbonne-Paris 1 University. In 1981, he was admitted at the Institute of Political Sciences in Paris, where he worked with French professor Alfred Grosser. In 1986, he received his Ph.D. In 1987 he began to work at the Faculty of Philosophy in Skopje.

In 1991, he forms several NGOs:

- Atlantic Treaty Association (ATA)
- JEF (Young European Federalists)
- European Movement

From early 1994 to late 2001, he was elected a Member of the Parliament of Macedonia twice (1994, 1998)

In 2001, he was nominated by president Boris Trajkovski to serve Macedonia as an Ambassador to NATO, in Brussels, where he remained until April 2008.

In March 2008, he received the Belgian Award, "Diplomat of the Year" from the Ministry of Foreign Affairs and The Diplomatic News magazine for year 2007. He was nominated by the Liberal Democratic Party to represent it at the 2009 presidential elections.

On 14 June 2012, he was awarded the French Knight of the Legion of Honor. The decoration was signed by Nicolas Sarkozy and was given to him by the French Ambassador to Macedonia, Jean-Claude Schlumberger.

As of July 2016, he is the elected Rector of FON University with a 4-year mandate.

== Books and articles ==
He wrote 15 books in the domain of the International Relationships and Social-Policy Studies and around 400 published articles for various newspapers. His latest book is " Nato in the Contemporary and International Relationships".

== Family and personal life ==
Nano is married with Danica Ružin who is a professional diplomat. He is the father of two sons, Alexander and Marko. He was a semi-professional handball player at Beton and Metalurg Clubs in Skopje and at the Racing Club de France in Paris. He is a fan of rock music.
