= Pella Square =

Main square in Skopje, North Macedonia

- Public square
- Плоштад Пела
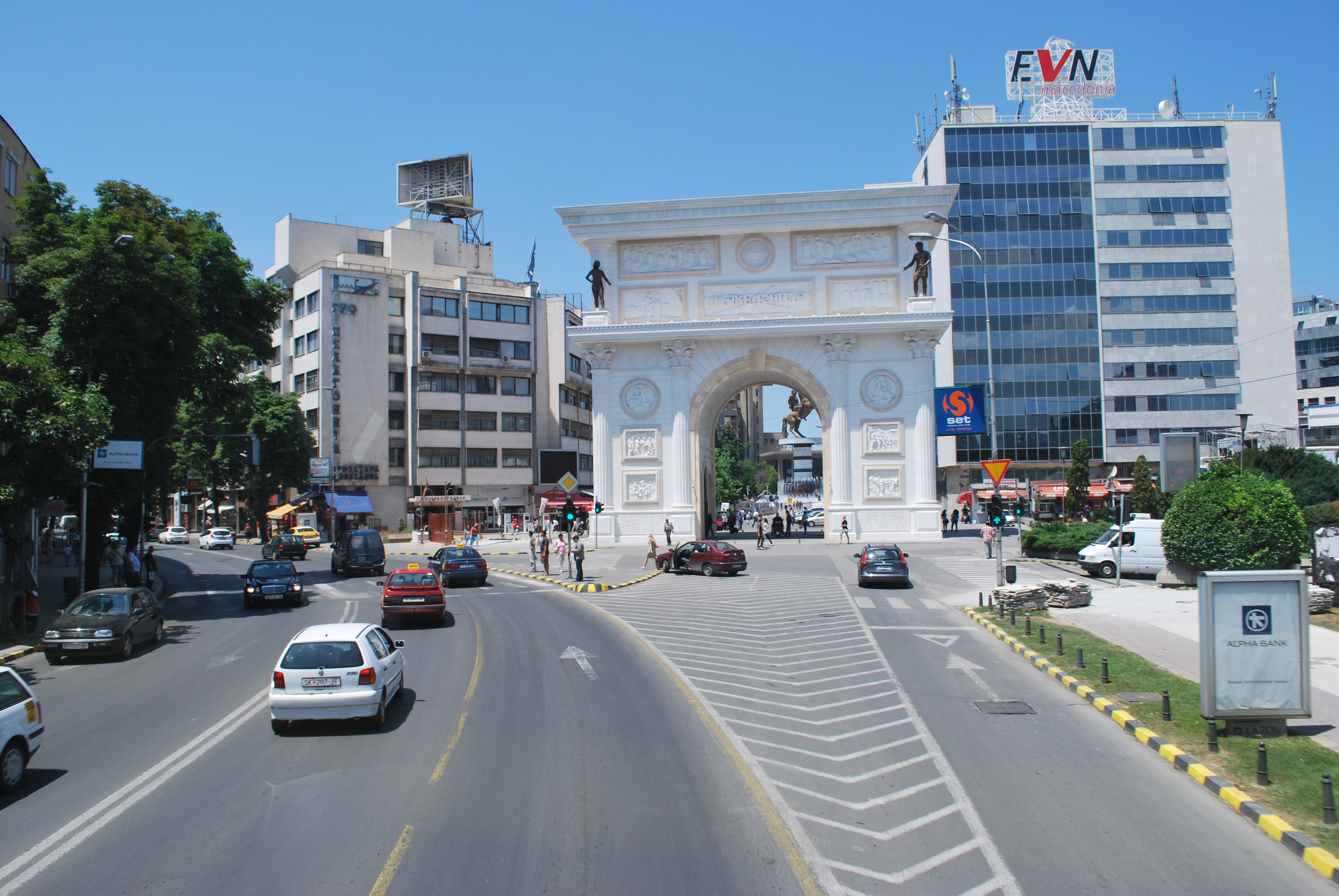
- Pella Square
- Owner: Skopje
- Interactive map of Pella Square
- Coordinates: 41.9961°N 21.4317°E

The Pella Square (Macedonian: Плоштад Пела) is one of the main squares of Skopje, the capital city of North Macedonia.

It is located in Centar Municipality, near the city's main square, Macedonia Square. The square is named after the Ancient city Pella, located in the current Pella regional unit of Central Macedonia in Greece. It was the capital of the ancient Macedonian kingdom. A statue of Krste Misirkov was unveiled at Pella Square in 2007. It commonly serves as the site of music concerts, political speeches, demonstrations or other gatherings.

== See also ==
- Antiquisation
