= Blagoj Nacoski =

Macedonian singer

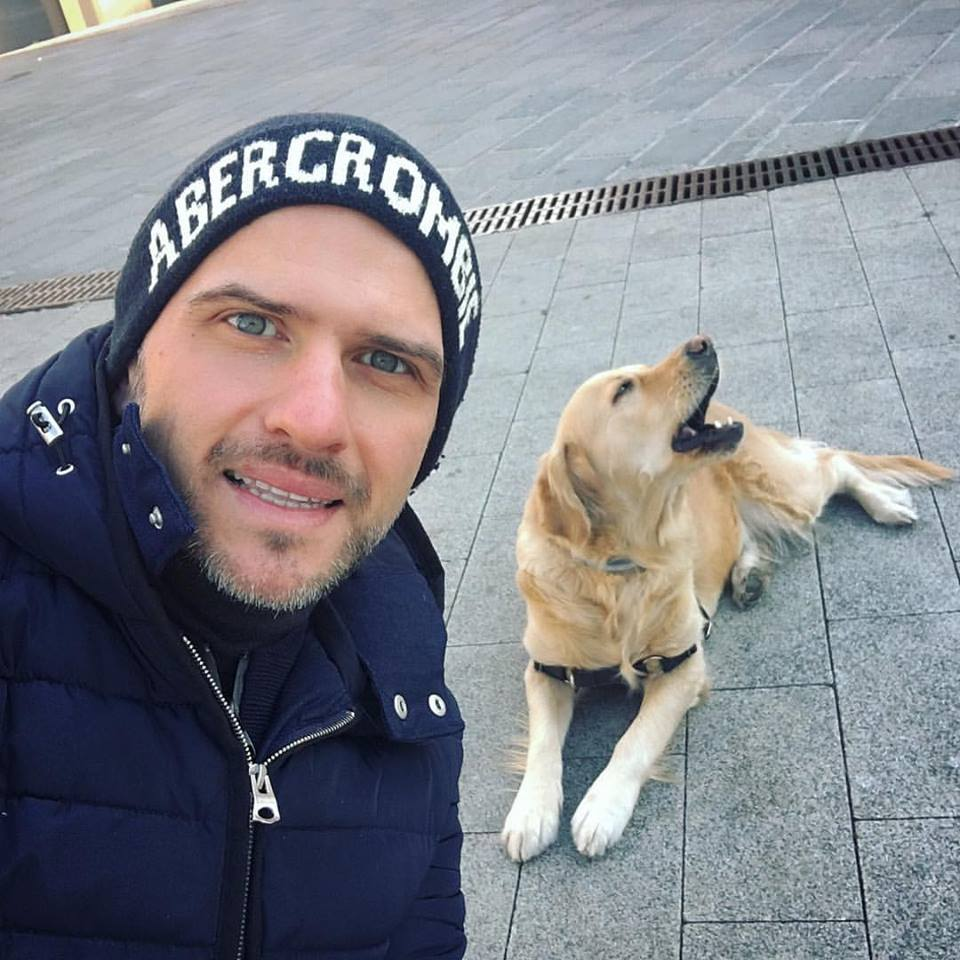
Blagoj Nacoski

Blagoj Nacoski (Macedonian: Благој Нацоски, born 18 May 1979 in Skopje), is a Macedonian tenor opera singer.

== Biography ==
He began his studies in his native city and continued in Rome, Italy with Mirella Parutto, Antonio Boyer and Anna Vandi and with Raul Gimenez in Barcelona, Spain. In February 2003 he made his operatic debut as Arturo in Donizetti's Lucia di Lammermoor at the stage of Rome Opera House (Teatro dell'Opera di Roma) with Maestro Daniel Oren. He has performed as Ferrando in Mozart's Così fan tutte in several opera theatres, including Stuttgart, Zurich and Genova, as Don Ottavio (Don Giovanni) in Miskolc, Cagliari and Genova, as Ernesto (Don Pasquale) in Miskolc, as Almaviva (Il barbiere di Siviglia) in Genova, as Belmonte (Die Entführung aus dem Serail) in Brussels, as Tamino (Die Zauberflöte) in Frankfurt, as Alfredo (La traviata) in Tokyo and as the title role in Mozart's Il sogno di Scipione in Klagenfurt and at the Salzburg Festival, a performance that was produced on DVD by the Deutsche Grammophon label in 2006. In May 2007 he made his debut in his native country on the stage of the Macedonian Opera and Ballet in Skopje, singing Lindoro in Rossini's Italiana in Algeri.

== Awards ==
- First place at The International Competition of The Foundation “Boris Christoff”, in Rome;
- Second place at The International Competition in Singing organized by Rotary International, in Pescara, Italy;
- Third place at The Competition of Opera Singers Not Above Age of 38, and the youngest finalist, Alcamo, Italy;
- The Award “Pierluigi Damiani” of The Union of Artists of Italy;
- The Special Award at The Competition “Spiros Argiris” in Sarzana, Italy;
- The Silver Medallion of “Accademia Filarmonica di Messina”;
- Winner at the "National Competitions in Opera, Lied and Oratorio Singing of Macedonia", 1995 and 1997;

== Reviews ==
- The flights and self-confidence of a young composer making his break-through are apparent throughout... That also applies to the name-part, mastered by Blagoj Nacoski with astonishing brilliance. (Frankfurter Rundschau, 21.08.2006)
- Le ténor Blagoj Nacoski, remplaçant à cette occasion Christoph Strehl, malade, séduit par l’homogénéité de sa voix et sa ligne de chant. Il est permis de croire qu’un léger surcroît d’ardeur en fera, d’ici peu, un des plus magnifiques Ferrando qui soit. (Resmusica, 31.01.2006)
- Blagoj Nacoski as Ferrando. I’ve never heard of him before, but when he first opened his mouth, I was mesmerized. His voice is so beautiful and creamy, it reminds me of whipped mascarpone. Although he sometimes was overshadowed by Drole's energetic and passionate acting, but his gorgeous voice put him right back into the spotlight again. (FHL, 02.02.2006)
- Le Belmonte du Macédonien Blagoj Nacoski, dont le timbre est idéal pour ce rôle, est très convaincant. (ConcertoNet, 09.09.2006)
- Don Ottavio era interpretato da Blagoj Nacoski, applauditissimo dal pubblico e convincente nel cantare “Quel che a lei piace vita mi rende, quel che le incresce morte mi dà. S’ella sospira sospiro anch’io; è mia quell’ira, quel pianto è mio. E non ho bene s’ella non ha”. (Teatro, 13.11.2005)
- Though Pogossov's a wonderful, A-list singer, the vocal prize would probably go (no wagering, please) to tenor Blagoj Nacoski as the Count. Almost annoyingly tall and handsome, Nacoski's purity and accuracy made it easy to accept his character's nobility and worth as a suitor for Rosina. (John Keillor, National Post, April 18, 2008)
