= Grupčin =

Grupčin Групчин Grupçin
- Village
- Location within North Macedonia
- Coordinates: 41°58′N 21°07′E
- Country: North Macedonia
- Region: Polog
- Municipality: Želino

Population (2021)
  - Total: 930
- Time zone: UTC+1 (CET)
  - Summer (DST): UTC+2 (CEST)
- Car plates: TE
- Website: .

Grupčin (Macedonian: Групчин, Albanian: Grupçin) is a village in the municipality of Želino, North Macedonia.

== Demographics ==
As of the 2021 census, Grupčin had 930 residents with the following ethnic composition:

- Albanians 871
- Persons for whom data are taken from administrative sources 59

According to the 2002 census, the village had a total of 968 inhabitants. Ethnic groups in the village include:

- Albanians 966
- Others 2
