= 1951 killing of five students from Strumica =

1951 killing in Yugoslavia

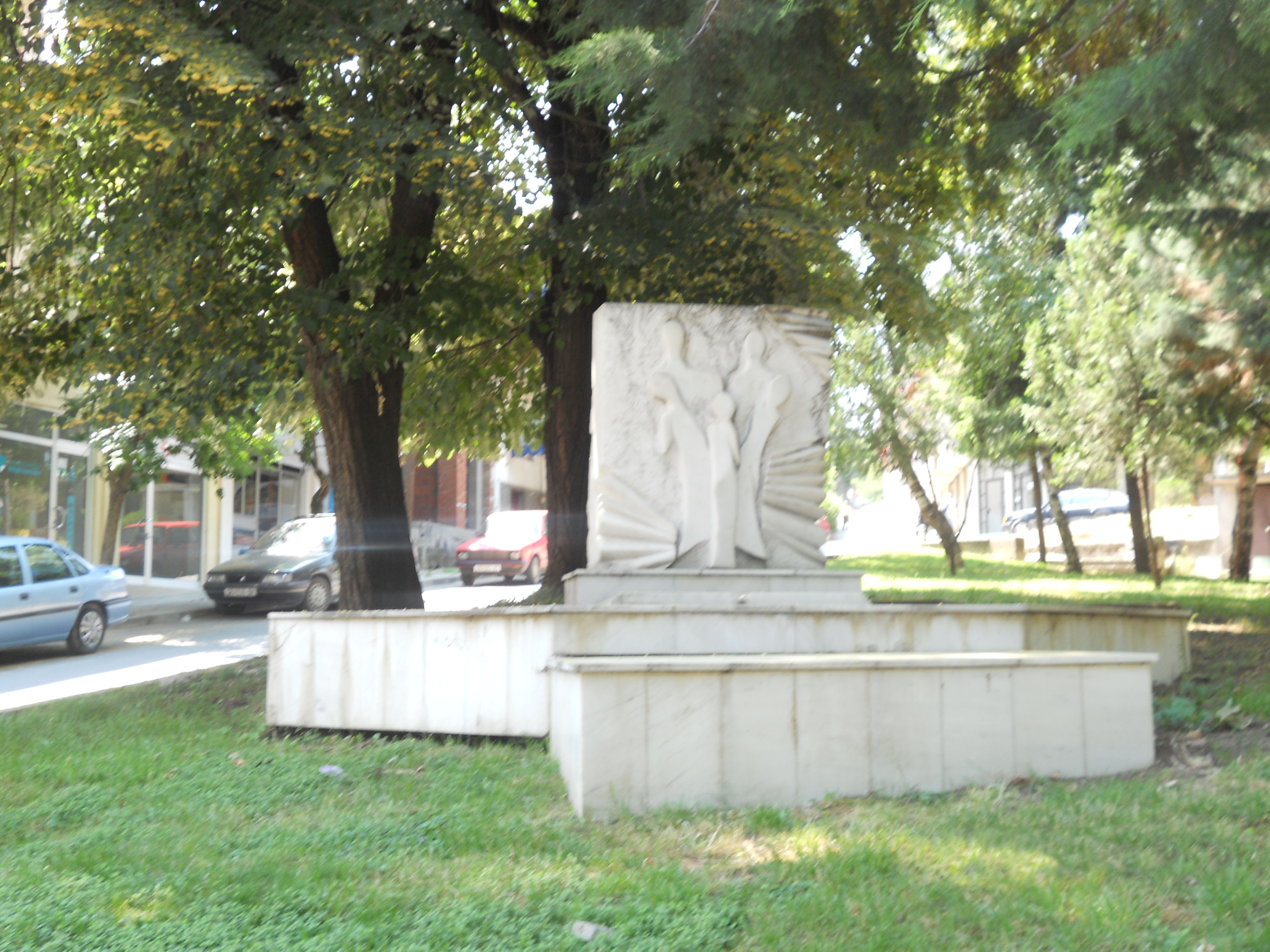
A monument built in their honor, located in the public park across the city council.

On 13 August 1951, a group of five students aged from 20 to 23, all born in Strumica, were killed by authorities in Communist Yugoslavia. The authorities branded them as enemies of the state.

== Event ==
In August 1951, five students were captured by the authorities in Strumica. They were brought near the Greek border, where they were beaten and mutilated for a day, and then shot point-blank on 13 August. Per CIA and Yugoslav authorities, the students attempted to flee to Greece.

The authorities that killed them returned their bodies to Strumica for burial in a graveyard. A large crowd flocked to the funeral of those killed, and their relatives built a large common gravestone, but after a few months the UDBA blew it up. The authorities did not reveal the reason for the killing and only labelled the five students as "enemies of the state". Per Bulgarian sources, they had Macedonian Bulgarian identity and were killed because of their ideas for an Independent Macedonia. Strumica's residents have interpreted the killing as being due to the students being dissidents and close to the ideals of the Internal Macedonian Revolutionary Organization.

The killing led to the CIA strengthening its attention on Strumica and its surroundings. In Newark, United States, and in São Paulo, Brazil, the pro-Bulgarian Macedonian Patriotic Organization set up its own chapters called Струмишката Петорка (Strumishkata Petorka/The Strumica Five). A film called Golden Five dedicated to the students was made in North Macedonia.
