= Mirella Parutto =

Italian opera singer (1936–2025)

Mirella Parutto (photo with 1960 dedication)

Mirella Parutto (4 May 1936 – 8 August 2025) was an Italian operatic soprano and later mezzo-soprano. She worked with notable conductors Tullio Serafin, Gabriele Santini, Antonino Votto, Herbert von Karajan, Lovro von Matačić, Gianandrea Gavazzeni, Vittorio Gui, Nino Sanzogno, and Oliviero De Fabritiis.

== Career ==
Parutto began her career at the Teatro alla Scala in Milan, as Elena in Boito's Mefistofele, in 1958, and the following year, appeared for the first time at the Teatro dell'Opera di Roma, as Amelia in Verdi's Un ballo in maschera. She then sang widely in Italy, appearing in Florence, Naples, Parma, Genoa, Palermo, Trieste, Venice, Cagliari, Catania, etc. Her roles included Matilde in William Tell, Abigail in Nabucco, Leonora in both Il trovatore and La forza del destino, the title role in Aida, and Maddalena in Andrea Chénier.

Parutto made guest appearances at the Vienna State Opera, the Teatro Nacional Sao Carlos in Lisbon, the Berlin State Opera, the Bolshoi in Moscow, etc. In 1965, she turned to mezzo-soprano roles, appearing in Rome, as Adalgisa in Norma, Ulrica in Un ballo in maschera, Marie in Wozzeck. The following year, she appeared in Florence, as Principessa di Bouillon in Adriana Lecouvreur and Ottavia in L'incoronazione di Poppea. Other roles included; Preziosilla, Santuzza, Federica, Amneris.

She made her American debut at the Dallas Opera, as Giovanna in Anna Bolena, in 1968, and appeared at the Teatro Colón in Buenos Aires, as Eboli in Don Carlo, in 1971.

Parutto can be heard on a few "live recordings" which attest to her wide-ranging voice and dramatic capabilities, notably as Leonora in Il trovatore (1961), opposite Franco Corelli and Ettore Bastianini, under De Fabritiis.

== Personal life and death ==
After retiring from the stage she turned to teaching with her husband, Antonio Boyer. Parutto died on 8 August 2025, at the age of 89.

== Selected recordings ==
- Verdi – Aida (Aida), Antonino Votto (Milan, 1956)
- Verdi – Nabucco (Abigail), Bruno Bartoletti (Florence, 1961)
- Verdi – Aida (Amneris), Oliviero de Fabritiis (Rome, 1966)
- Verdi – Don Carlo (Eboli), Carlo Franci (Venice, 1969)

== See also ==
- Italian opera
