= Ljube Boškoski =

Macedonian politician (born 1960)

- Љубе Бошкоски
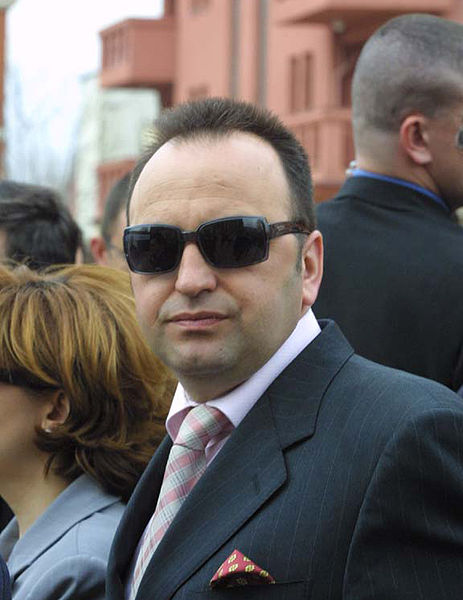

Interior Minister of Macedonia
- In office 13 May 2001 – 1 November 2002
- President: Boris Trajkovski
- Prime Minister: Ljubco Georgievski
- Preceded by: Dosta Dimovska
- Succeeded by: Hari Kostov

Personal details
- Born: 24 October 1960 (age 65) Čelopek, Brvenica, FPR Yugoslavia
- Party: United for Macedonia (2009–present)
- Other political affiliations: VMRO-DPMNE (1998–2009)
- Education: Skopje University

Ljube Boškoski (Macedonian: Љубе Бошкоски, Macedonian pronunciation: [ˈʎubɛ 'bɔʃkɔski]; born 24 October 1960) is a Macedonian politician and former Minister of Internal Affairs of Macedonia (now North Macedonia).

He created and led a controversial elite special operations tactical unit of the Macedonian police called Lions in his capacity as Minister of Internal Affairs. Boškoski would later be accused of command responsibility by the ICTY for war crimes in Ljuboten during the 2001 insurgency in Macedonia, but was acquitted of all charges. Upon his return to Macedonia, Boškoski and his backers split from VMRO–DPMNE to form United for Macedonia, but did not win any seats in the parliament in the 2011 parliamentary election.

In 2011, he was arrested by the police, and detained by the court for alleged illegal funding of the election campaign. He served a prison sentence for illegal campaign funding and abuse of office during the 2011 election campaign of his party but was later acquitted in a retrial. Boškoski is also on the United States black list, held by the Office of Foreign Assets Control, for "engaging in, or assisting, sponsoring, or supporting extremist violence in the Republic of Macedonia and elsewhere in the Western Balkans region."

== Early life and career ==
Boškoski was born on 24 October 1960, in the village of Čelopek on the outskirts of Tetovo (now in Brvenica municipality, North Macedonia). In 1985, he graduated from the Faculty of Law at the Ss. Cyril and Methodius University in Skopje, thereafter working as an apprentice in a court and later as a legal adviser for a health insurance fund in Rovinj, Croatia. During the Serbo-Croat war in the 1990s, he fought on the Croat side. Among his associates, he has been known as Brother Ljube. In the 2001 insurgency in Macedonia, he called for an all-out offensive against the Albanian insurgents and created the controversial special police unit called Lions.

== Raštanski Lozja killings ==
On 2 March 2002, at approximately 4:00 a.m. local time (UTC+1 GMT), six Pakistani citizens and an Indian citizen were shot dead in Raštanski Lozja near the village of Ljuboten, close to the Macedonian border with Kosovo. It was alleged that the men were armed. They were killed by the Lions. Macedonian officials were accused by the Macedonian police of killing the men as an act of further enhancing their status in the war on terror which the Macedonian government supports. It was alleged that the men were killed "to impress the US". The Macedonian police spokeswoman Mirjana Konteska said the killings were "an act of a sick mind" and that they had "lost their lives in a staged murder."

Boškoski made a statement suggesting that the men were associated with a terrorist group and had planned attacks on the British, American and German embassies in the Macedonian capital of Skopje. On 4 May 2004, he was charged with having instigated the killings which he denied. The parliamentary committee removed his parliamentary immunity and the prosecution demanded his arrest. He fled to Croatia on 4 May, where he also had citizenship. The Macedonian authorities transferred the case to Croatia as he could not be extradited due to his Croatian citizenship. Croatian police arrested him on 31 August. On 22 April 2005, the perpetrators of the killings were acquitted of murder. In 2008, Macedonia requested the return of the case. The case was indefinitely postponed by Croatia in 2009. Croatia dropped the charge against him in 2022.

== Ljuboten case and aftermath ==
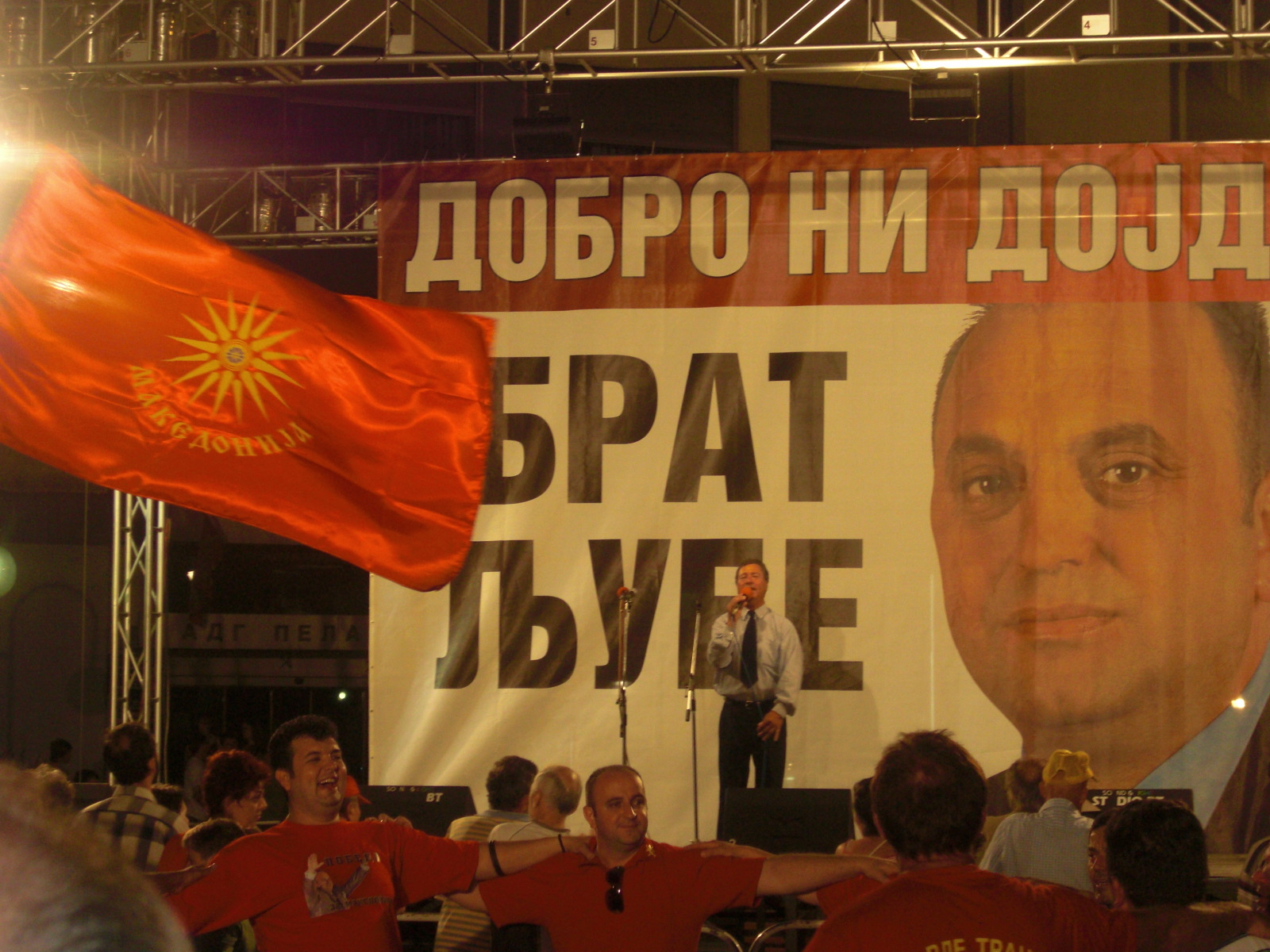
People celebrating Boškoski's arrival at the welcome-rally at Pella Square, Skopje

After eight soldiers were killed when they ran over a mine near Ljuboten on 10 August 2001, he had ordered a police operation against the village during which ten Albanian civilians were killed. Boškoski was indicted with Johan Tarčulovski on 15 March 2005. According to the tribunal, Boškoski, in his capacity as Minister of the Interior, "had de jure and de facto command and control over the members of the police forces which took part in the alleged crimes." Per the indictment, he "knew or had reason to know that the crimes alleged in this indictment had been committed by his subordinates." Along with Tarčulovski, he was charged with three counts of violations of the laws or customs of war: murder, wanton destruction of cities, towns or villages and cruel treatment. On 24 March, he was transferred to the ICTY in The Hague.

Boškoski pleaded not guilty to all of the charges. The ICTY trial against him and Tarčulovski started on 16 April 2007 and ended on 10 July 2008, when he was acquitted of all charges against him. However, Tarčulovski was found guilty and received twelve years of imprisonment.

When Boškoski arrived at the Skopje Alexander the Great Airport on 11 July 2008, he symbolically kissed the ground and was welcomed by women in traditional Macedonian clothes, and by the prime minister Nikola Gruevski. With tears in his eyes, he gave a short speech in which he called for brotherhood among the people living in Macedonia. Later that day, he appeared at Pella Square in Skopje and was welcomed by Macedonians who travelled from all over the country to the capital city. In June 2009, he was placed on the United States black list for "engaging in, or assisting, sponsoring, or supporting extremist violence in the Republic of Macedonia and elsewhere in the Western Balkans region." The prosecution filed an appeal against his acquittal. On 19 May 2010, the Appeals Chamber upheld his acquittal and dismissed the prosecution's single ground of appeal. According to a 2013 investigation by the Balkan Investigative Reporting Network, Macedonia had spent an estimated 9.5 million euros to defend, support and lobby for him and Tarčulovski.

== Political career ==
After the parliamentary elections in 1998 and the success of VMRO-DPMNE, Boškoski was named deputy director of the Directorate for Security and CounterIntelligence – the domestic intelligence agency of the Macedonian government. On 31 January 2001, he was named state secretary of the Ministry of Internal Affairs, and on May of the same year, appointed Minister of Internal Affairs by the ruling government. In 2002, while doing an exercise with a grenade launcher, he ended up injuring four people and the Union of Journalists called for his resignation. Following the parliamentary election of 15 September 2002 and his party's loss of power, he left his position as Minister of Internal Affairs and became a member of parliament of VMRO-DPMNE. In April 2004, Boškoski nominated to run in the presidential elections and had previously collected 10,000 signatures as is required of potential candidates. The State Electoral Commission invalidated his candidacy as he had not fulfilled the requirement that all presidential candidates live in the country for 15 consecutive years before nomination. Boškoski as an independent candidate took part in the 2009 Macedonian presidential election and ended up fourth out of seven candidates with 145,638 votes (14.87% out of total votes).

In May 2009, Boškoski split from VMRO-DPMNE and formed a conservative political party called "United for Macedonia". He criticized Gruevski's politics, accusing him of stalling the country's Euro-Atlantic integration. On 6 June 2011, one day after the 2011 election, on which United for Macedonia did not win any parliamentary seats, Boškoski was arrested by the police for allegedly illegally funding his party's campaign. During the arrest, the police alleged that he had 100.000 euros in cash, received illegally, intended for financing of the campaign. According to the police, Boškoski had been followed by them on a court order for two months before the arrest and had received an additional 30.000 euros of illegal funds during this period.

Boškoski was brought in front of a judge, who ordered his 30-day detention, before the trial on charges of abuse of office and illegal financing of a political party. He pled not guilty to all charges. On 29 November 2011, he was convicted of illegal campaign funding and abuse of office, and sentenced to seven years in prison. The main opposition party and his supporters accused the government of interfering in the judicial process, and the police of framing Boškoski and putting him in jail because of his fierce criticism of the government in his campaign speeches. Boškoski's family also stated that the verdict was politically motivated and that they would bring the case to the international courts. Boškoski appealed against his prison sentence in 2012, insisting that the case was politically orchestrated by the government of Nikola Gruevski. In the next year, he brought a lawsuit against Macedonia to the European Court of Human Rights (ECHR), stating that the case violated his human rights. He was released from prison in 2016. In 2020, ECHR determined that his rights to a fair trial were violated, ordering that he be paid 4,500 euros for non-material damage and 1,220 euros for expenses. At the request of his lawyers, the case was retried and he was acquitted in 2023.

Political offices
Preceded by Dosta Dimovska	Minister of Internal Affairs; 2001–2002	Succeeded by Hari Kostov
