= Ljubanci =

Ljubanci Љубанци
- Village
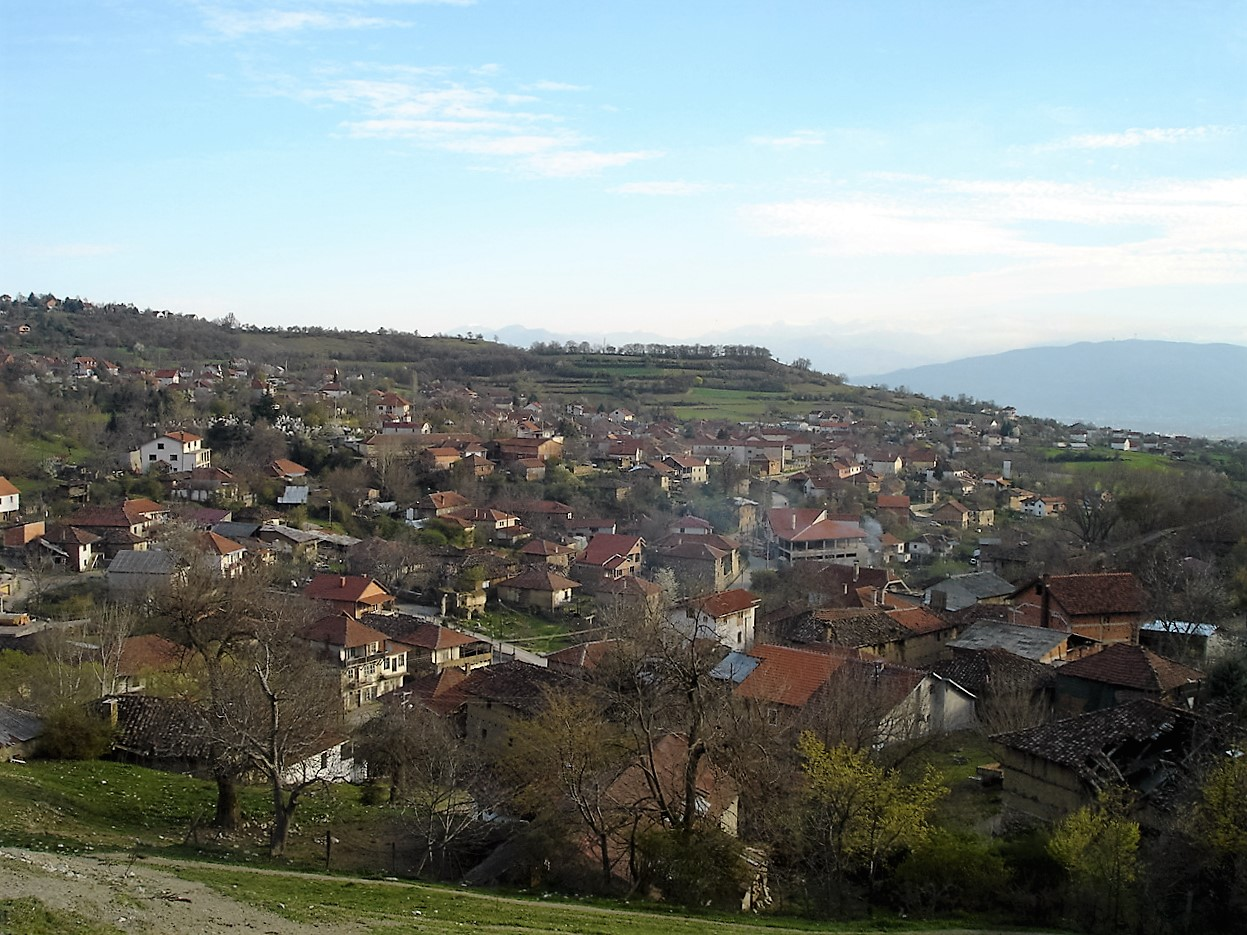

- Location in Butel Municipality

- Location within North Macedonia
- Coordinates: 42.106134°N 21.454378°E
- Country: North Macedonia
- Region: Skopje
- Municipality: Butel

Population (2021)
  - Total: 1,075
- Time zone: UTC+1 (CET)
  - Summer (DST): UTC+2 (CEST)
- Website: .

Ljubanci (Macedonian: Љубанци) is a village near the city of Skopje, North Macedonia, and part of the municipality of Butel, North Macedonia.

== Demographics ==
According to the 2021 census, the village had a total of 1.075 inhabitants. Ethnic groups in the village include:

- Macedonians 981
- Persons for whom data are taken from administrative sources 71
- Turks 2
- Serbs 8
- Romani 10
- Vlachs 1
- Others 2

Year	Macedonian	Albanian	Turks	Romani	Vlachs	Serbs	Bosniaks	Others	Persons for whom data are taken from admin. sources	Total
2002	912	...	...	9	...	6	...	1	n/a	928
2021	981	...	2	10	1	8	...	2	71	1.075

== Sports ==
Local football club FK Ljubanci 1974 have played in the Macedonian Second League.
