= Butel Municipality =

Municipality of North Macedonia

Coordinates: 42.00°N 21.47°E

Butel Municipality Општина Бутел Komuna e Butelit
- City municipality (Rural)
- Flag Coat of arms

- Country: North Macedonia
- Region: Skopje
- Municipal seat: Butel

Government
  - Mayor: Darko Kostovski (VMRO-DPMNE)

Population
  - Total: 37,968

Official Language(s)
  - primary: Macedonian, Albanian
- Time zone: UTC+1 (CET)
- Website: http://www.opstinabutel.gov.mk

Butel Municipality (Macedonian: Бутел; Albanian: Butel) is one of the ten municipalities that make up the City of Skopje, the capital of North Macedonia. The municipality administration consists of a council and mayor.

== Geography ==
Butel is located along the north-central and north-eastern areas of Skopje not far from the modern city center and most of the municipality extends eastward in a panhandle shape toward the Skopska Crna Gora mountain range. It borders the Gazi Baba Municipality to the southeast, the Čair Municipality to the south, the Karpoš Municipality to the southwest, the Šuto Orizari and Čučer-Sandevo Municipalities to the northwest, and the Lipkovo Municipality to the northeast.

== History ==
Prior to 2004 the Butel municipality was within the boundaries of a larger Čair municipality that had a majority Macedonian population (60.60%), followed by Albanians (20.89%), Turks (4.12%), Bosniaks (3.40%), Romani (1.46%) and Serbs (2.11%). The new territorial-administrative reform of 2004 divided the municipal unit into a smaller Čair municipality with an Albanian majority and a separate Butel municipality with a Macedonian majority. The new boundaries of Čair municipality resulted in the loss of its industrial zone to the Butel municipality which previously provided most of the revenue for the Čair municipal budget.

== Demographics ==
According to North Macedonia's latest 2021 census, the Butel municipality has 37,968 inhabitants. Ethnic groups in the municipality include:

	2002		2021	
	Number	%	Number	%
TOTAL	36,154	100	37,968	100
Macedonians	22,506	62.25	17,011	44.8
Albanians	9,107	25.19	14,095	37.12
Turks	1,304	3.61	1,314	3.46
Bosniaks	970	2.68	1,133	2.98
Serbs	1,033	2.86	606	1.6
Roma	561	1.55	501	1.32
Vlachs	120	0.33	73	0.19
Other / Undeclared / Unknown	553	1.53	582	1.54
Persons for whom data are taken from administrative sources			2,653	6.99

Per the 2021 North Macedonia census Butel had a total population of 37,968, of whom 19,230 were female and 18,738 male.[5]

- Religious affiliation according to the 2021 North Macedonia census:

	2021	
	Number	%
TOTAL	37,968	100
Orthodox	13,564	46.4
Christians	3,977	46.4
Catholics	89	46.4
Islam	17,438	45.9
Others	247	0.65
Persons for whom data are taken from administrative sources	2,653	6.99

- Demographic Trends Live births by ethnic affiliation of mother, 2010-2023

	Macedonians		Albanians		Turks		Serbs		Roma		Bosniaks		Others		TOTAL
Year	Births	%	Births	%	Births	%	Births	%	Births	%	Births	%	Births	%	Births
2010	225	49.13	194	42.36	11	2.40	2	0.44	9	1.97	9	1.97	8	1.75	458
2011	260	50.39	207	40.12	16	3.10	2	0.39	7	1.36	10	1.94	14	2.71	516
2012	222	47.64	188	40.34	20	4.29	6	1.29	10	2.15	14	3.00	6	1.29	466
2013	211	45.57	207	44.71	12	2.59	2	0.43	11	2.38	14	3.02	6	1.30	463
2014	223	50.68	174	39.55	18	4.09	2	0.45	9	2.05	8	1.82	6	1.36	440
2015	203	41.18	243	49.29	14	2.84	0	0.00	8	1.62	18	3.65	7	1.42	493
2016	227	44.69	224	44.09	19	3.74	3	0.59	12	2.36	15	2.95	8	1.57	508
2017	214	45.53	202	42.98	11	2.34	1	0.21	10	2.13	14	2.98	18	3.83	470
2018	183	40.58	220	48.78	18	3.99	3	0.67	8	1.77	12	2.66	7	1.55	451
2019	186	38.67	247	51.35	12	2.49	2	0.42	14	2.91	15	3.12	5	1.04	481
2020	164	38.32	217	50.70	8	1.87	2	0.47	11	2.57	19	4.44	7	1.64	428
2021	153	35.01	233	53.32	17	3.89	2	0.46	10	2.29	11	2.52	11	2.52	437
2022	154	35.98	230	53.74	11	2.57	5	1.17	12	2.80	9	2.10	6	1.40	428
2023	142	32.87	240	55.56	20	4.63	2	0.46	7	1.62	15	3.47	6	1.39	432

== Inhabited places ==
There are 5 inhabited places in this municipality.

Inhabited Places	Total	Macedonians	Albanians	Turks	Roma	Vlachs	Serbs	Bosnians	Others
Butel Municipality	37,968	17,011	14,095	1,314	501	-	606	1,133	1,969
Butel	24.391	10.451	8.646	1.229	258	56	353	1.002	2.396
Ljubanci	1.075	981	-	2	10	1	8	-	73
Ljuboten	2.688	76	2.561	-	7	-	1	-	43
Radišani	6.066	4.904	216	27	138	12	204	103	462
Vizbegovo	3.748	599	2.672	56	88	4	40	28	261
