= Ljuboten, Butel =

Ljuboten Љуботен Luboten
- Village
- Location in Butel Municipality

- Location within Republic of North Macedonia
- Coordinates: 42°05′40″N 21°28′10″E
- Country: North Macedonia
- Region: Skopje
- Municipality: Butel

Population (2021)
  - Total: 2,688
- Time zone: UTC+1 (CET)
  - Summer (DST): UTC+2 (CEST)
- Car plates: SK
- Website: .

Ljuboten (Macedonian: Љуботен, Albanian: Luboten) is a village in the municipality of Butel, North Macedonia. It used to be part of Čair Municipality.

== Demographics ==
According to the 1467-68 Ottoman defter, Ljuboten exhibits a mix of Orthodox Christian Slavic and Albanian anthroponyms. Some families had a mixed Slav-Albanian anthroponomy.

According to the 2021 census, the village had a total of 2.688 inhabitants.

- Albanians 2.561
- Macedonians 76
- Romani 7
- Serbs 1
- Others 43

Year	Macedonian	Albanian	Turks	Romani	Vlachs	Serbs	Bosniaks	Others	Total
2002	2	2.223	...	...	...	1	...	4	2.343
2021	76	2.561	...	7	...	1	...	43	2.688
