= Čair Municipality =

Municipality of North Macedonia

Municipality of Čair Општина Чаир Komuna e Çairit
- City municipality (Urban)
- Flag Coat of arms

- Coordinates: 42°0′7″N 21°26′17″E
- Country: North Macedonia
- Region: Skopje
- Municipal seat: Čair

Government
  - Mayor: Izet Mexhiti (VLEN)

Area
  - Total: 3.52 km^{2} (1.36 sq mi)

Population
  - Total: 62,586
  - Density: 17,780/km^{2} (46,000/sq mi)

Languages
  - primary: Macedonian, Albanian
- Time zone: UTC+1 (CET)
- Website: Official website

Čair (Macedonian: Чаир, Albanian: Komuna e Çairit) is one of the ten municipalities that make up Skopje, the capital of North Macedonia. The municipal administration consists of a council and mayor. Skopje's old town is located in Čair. The municipality has a predominantly Albanian population.

== Geography ==
Čair is located along the northern (left) bank of the Vardar River, opposite the modern city center. It borders Centar Municipality to the southwest, Karpoš Municipality to the west, Butel Municipality to the north, and Gazi Baba Municipality to the east.

== History ==
The name "Čair" is derived from the Turkish word for "meadow" or "pasture", çayır. The municipality is still called Çayır Belediyesi in modern Turkish and amongst the small ethnic Turkish minority that resides there.

Skopje's old town, or Stara Čaršija, had been the city's main center at least since the 12th century. Turkish influence is dominant in the Stara Čaršija. Due to five centuries of Ottoman rule the old town is still filled with Ottoman style buildings, narrow cobblestone walkways and many mosques. Next to the Old Bazaar is Bit Pazar, Skopje's largest market that has retained its multi-ethnic and multi-lingual environment where rural people come to sell farming produce and locals conduct business.

Čair is historically a multi-ethnic area. In the aftermath of the 2001 insurgency some Macedonians from Čair moved to other Skopje urban areas such as nearby Butel in the north or to southern Macedonian neighbourhoods where there is an availability of public infrastructure. Čair municipality prior to 2004 was larger and included Butel municipality within its boundaries that has a majority Macedonian population (48.60%), followed by Albanians (38.89%), Turks (4.12%), Bosniaks (3.40%), Romani (1.46%) and Serbs (2.11%). The new territorial-administrative reform of 2004 divided the municipal unit into a smaller Čair municipality with an Albanian majority (57.01%) and a separate Butel municipality with a Macedonian majority. The new boundaries of Čair municipality resulted in the loss of its industrial zone to Butel municipality which previously provided most of the revenue for the Čair municipal budget.

In the Macedonian elections of March 2005, Izet Mexhiti, a member of the Albanian political party Democratic Union for Integration (DUI) became the mayor of Čair municipality. A coalition between DUI and the Macedonian Social Democratic Union of Macedonia (SDSM) was formed in the municipal council while other smaller Albanian and Macedonian parties were also represented. In 2006 the municipal council adopted a new flag and coat of arms that displayed Skanderbeg, the Old Bazaar and the Ottoman clock tower (Saat kula) that did not have the support of Macedonian counselors.

Skanderbeg Square is located in Čair. In the late 2000s a statue of Skanderbeg commemorating the medieval Albanian warrior was installed in an open space at the front entrance to the Old Bazaar by Čair municipality. During the 2010s, Čair Municipality and ethnic Albanians living in the Macedonian capital refurbished the space into a second city square as part of a rival project to the government's “Skopje 2014” revamp scheme which excluded investments for the area. Political negotiation between Albanian and Macedonian elites resulted in the Macedonian Government funding most of the refurbishment of Skanderbeg Square.

On 26 November 2019, an earthquake struck Albania and Čair Municipality held 3 days of mourning in solidarity with the earthquake victims.

== Demographics ==
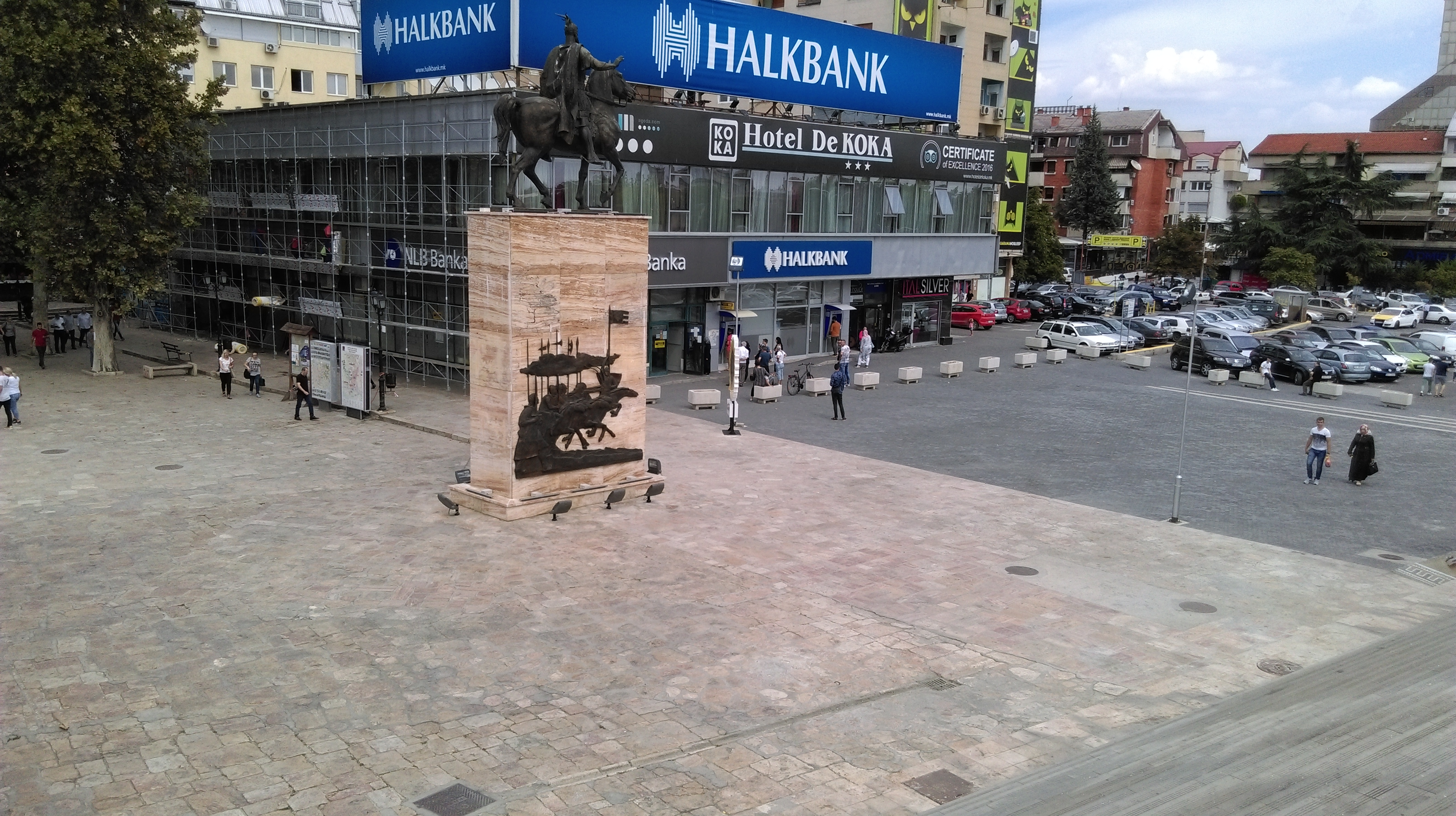
Skanderbeg Square (2018)

Čair has a mixed population that includes minorities of Romani and Turks, yet the neighborhood is associated with Albanians in North Macedonia. In the modern era relations between ethnic groups in Čair Municipality remain cordial.

According to the 2021 North Macedonia census, Čair municipality has 62,586 inhabitants. Ethnic groups in the municipality include:

	2002		2021	
	Number	%	Number	%
TOTAL	64,773	100	62,586	100
Albanians	36,921	57	42,180	67.4
Macedonians	15,628	24,13	5,357	8.56
Turks	4,500	6.95	4,182	6.68
Bosniaks	2,950	4.55	2,531	4.04
Roma	3,083	4.76	1,337	2.14
Serbs	621	0.96	202	0.32
Vlachs	78	0.12	37	0.06
Other / Undeclared / Unknown	992	1.53	534	0.85
Persons for whom data are taken from administrative sources			6,226	9.95

== Sports ==
Macedonian football's top-tier side KF Shkupi plays its home games at Čair Stadium.
