= Old Bazaar, Prilep =

Bazaar in North Macedonia

Coordinates: 41°20′45″N 21°33′17″E

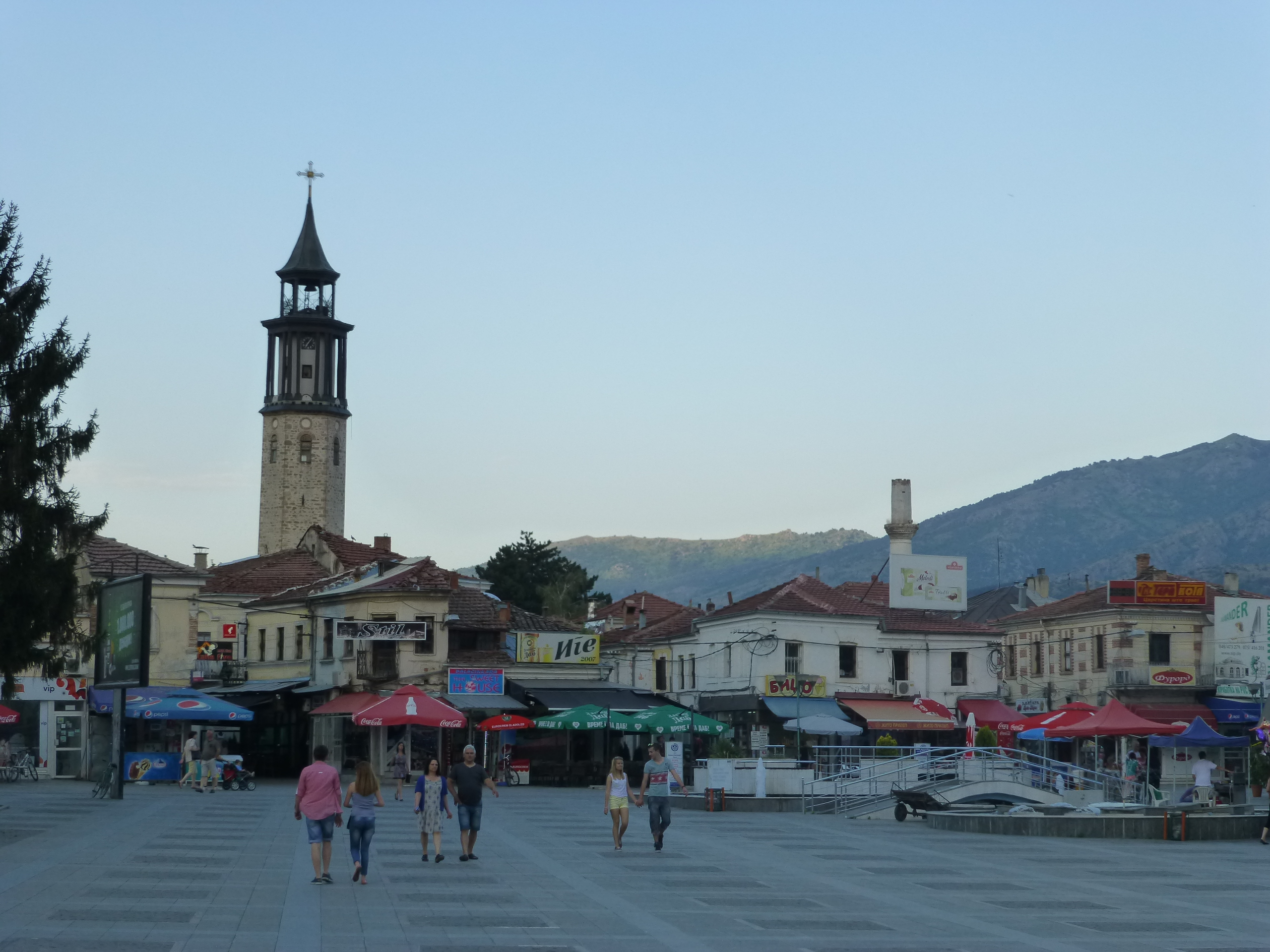
Prilep's Old Bazaar, as seen from Čento Square. The Prilep Clock Tower (Saat-Kula) overlooks the main square, and the ruined minaret of Čarši Mosque can be seen in the background.

The Old Bazaar (Macedonian: Стара чаршија, romanized: Stara čaršija) is a bazaar located in Prilep, North Macedonia. It is located east of the main city square and north of the Prilep River. The bazaar dates from the second half of the 18th century, when Prilep grew in commercial and economic significance. Most of its present appearance dates from the 19th century.

The bazaar is listed as an Object of Cultural Heritage by the Ministry of Culture, while several commercial buildings, the city clock tower, a mosque, and а hamam within it are also listed individually. Many of the historic crafts present in Prilep's bazaar are at risk of dying out or already have died out due to industrial production. The pottery trade, for instance, was once represented in 38 shops employing about 360 people; just one such shop remains today.

== Landmarks ==
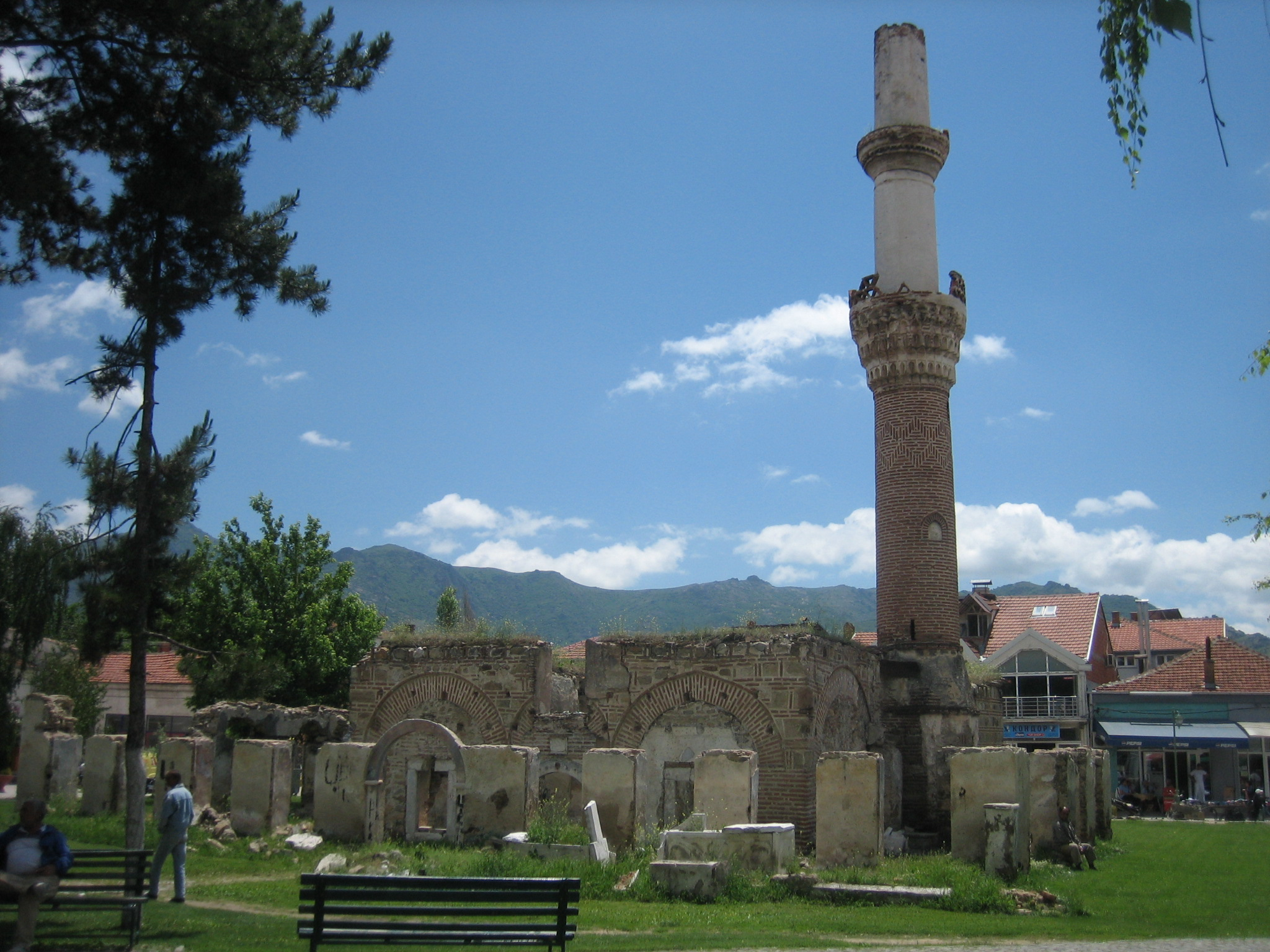
The ruined Čarši Mosque

=== Clock Tower ===
Prilep's hexagonal Clock Tower is located at the heart of the bazaar and dominates its skyline. It was built in 1858 in a neoclassical style, following a fire which destroyed the previous clock tower. Designed by Petrе Lautsо, its building was funded by the city residents. It is intact since its original construction and stands 38 m (125 ft) tall. The Clock Tower is considered a leaning tower.

=== Čarši Mosque ===
Directly south of the Clock Tower is the Čarši Mosque, built in 1476 or 1477. It is also known as the Haci Hüseyin ben Abdallah Mosque, after the individual who ordered its construction. The date of its construction is a signifier of the time around when the commercial centre of Prilep shifted from its previous hub at the Varoš area below Marko's Towers to the plain further below through which the Prilep River passes. Much of the mosque was destroyed in a fire in 1856/1857. Afterwards, it consisted of an original portion and a reconstructed portion. Its single minaret has two balconies.

The mosque sits in ruins after it was deliberately set on fire on 8 August 2001 by locals in response to the Karpalak ambush on the same day, in which 10 Macedonian security members from Prilep were killed by the National Liberation Army, part of the 2001 insurgency in Macedonia. The Macedonian government, with the assistance of UNESCO and Turkish foundations, had plans to reconstruct the mosque three years after it was razed, but the project did not take hold due to opposition from local residents.

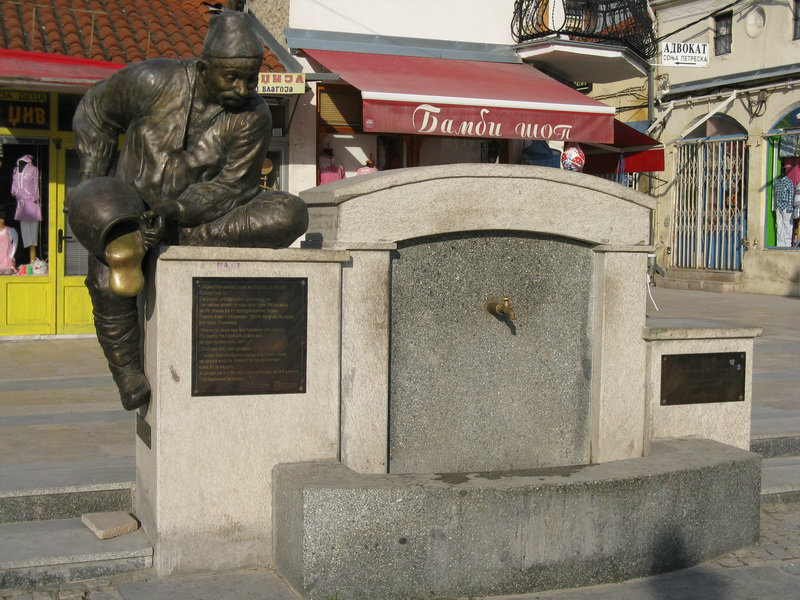
Itar Pejo fountain

=== Itar Pejo fountain ===
The bazaar has a fountain with a depiction of the Itar Pejo character of Macedonian folklore. Sculpted by Zharko Basheski, the monument was completed in 2008.

=== Hamam (Turkish Bathhouse) ===
The hamam sits at the northern edge of the bazaar on Goce Delčev Boulevard. It is in poor, nearly ruined condition.
