= Public holidays in North Macedonia =

Public holidays are observed in the Republic of North Macedonia for a number of reasons, including religious and national significance. They are generally accompanied by celebrations. The holidays are regulated by the 1998 Law on Holidays. If a national holiday happens to be observed on a Sunday, the next (working) day (Monday) will be non-working.

== National holidays ==
Date	English name	Local name	2025 date	2026 date	Remarks
1 January	New Year's Day	Нова Година, Nova Godina	2 January	1 January	
7 January	Orthodox Christmas	Прв ден Божик, Prv den Božik	7 January	8 January	
April/May	Orthodox Easter Monday	Втор ден Велигден, Vtor den Veligden	17 April	6 May	It is always on a Sunday.
1 May	Labour Day	Ден на трудот, Den na trudot	1 May	1 May	
24 May	Saints Cyril and Methodius Day	Св. Кирил и Методиј, Ден на сèсловенските просветители; Sv. Kiril i Metodij, Den na sèslovenskite prosvetiteli	24 May	24 May	
2 August	Republic Day	Ден на Републиката, Den na Republikata	2 August	2 August	It marks the day of the proclamation of the Ilinden Uprising in 1903, as well as the proclamation of the Socialist Republic of Macedonia in 1944.
8 September	Independence Day	Ден на независноста, Den na nezavisnosta	8 September	8 September	It marks the day of independence from Yugoslavia, achieved with the 1991 referendum.
11 October	Day of the Macedonian Uprising	Ден на востанието, Den na vostanieto	11 October	11 October	It marks the start of the Macedonian anti-fascist resistance during WWII with an attack in Prilep in 1941.
23 October	Day of the Macedonian Revolutionary Struggle	Ден на македонската револуционерна борба, Den na makedonskata revolucionarna borba	23 October	23 October	It marks the day when the Internal Macedonian Revolutionary Organization (IMRO) was established in 1893.
8 December	Saint Clement of Ohrid	Св. Климент Охридски, Sv. Kliment Ohridski	8 December	9 December	
1 Shawwal	Eid al-Fitr	Рамазан Бајрам, Fitër Bajrami	21 April	10 April	Islamic calendar

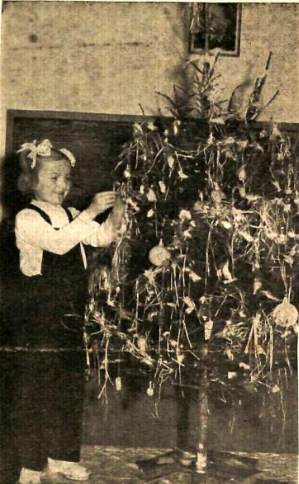
Girl from Kumanovo is decorating a Christmas tree.

Besides these, there are several major religious and ethnic communities' holidays:

Date	English name	Local name	2023 date	2024 date	Celebrated by
6 January	Christmas Eve	Бадник, Badnik	6 January	6 January	Orthodox Christians
19 January	Baptism of Jesus	Водици, Vodici	19 January	19 January	Orthodox Christians
8 April	International Romani Day	Меѓународен ден на Ромите, Maśkarthemutno rromenqo dives	8 April	8 April	Ethnic Romani people
5 May	Macedonian Language Day	Ден на македонскиот јазик, Den na makedonskiot jazik	5 May	5 May	Ethnic Macedonians
23 May	Aromanian National Day	Национален ден на Власите, Aromanian national dzuã	23 May	23 May	Ethnic Aromanians
18 August	Army Day	Ден на армијата Република Северна Македонија, Den na armijata Republika Severna Makedonija	18 August	18 August	Army of the Republic of North Macedonia
28 August	Assumption of Mary	Успение на Пресвета Богородица, Uspenie na Presveta Bogorodica	28 August	28 August	Orthodox Christians
28 September	International Bosniaks Day	Меѓународен ден на Бошњаците, Međunarodni dan Bošnjaka	28 September	28 September	Ethnic Bosniaks
1 November	All Saints' Day	Сите Светци, Site Svetci	1 November	1 November	Catholics and Protestants
22 November	Albanian Alphabet Day	Ден на Албанската азбука, Dita e Alfabetit Shqip	22 November	22 November	Ethnic Albanians
21 December	Turkish Language Education Day	Ден на настава на турски јазик, Türkçe Öğretim Günü	21 December	21 December	Ethnic Turks
25 December	Christmas	Божиќ, Božiḱ	25 December	25 December	Catholics and Protestants
variable	Good Friday	Велики Петок, Veliki Petok	14 April	3 May	Orthodox Christians
variable	Good Friday	Велики Петок, Veliki Petok	10 April	1 April	Catholics and Protestants
variable	Pentecost	Духовден, Duhovden	2 June	21 June	Orthodox Christians, 7 weeks after Good Friday
10 Tishrei	Yom Kippur	Јом Кипур, Jom Kipur	25 September	12 October	Jews
10 Dhu al-Hijjah	Eid al-Adha	Курбан Бајрам, Kurban Bajrami	28 June	16 June	Muslims

== See also ==
- Public holidays in Yugoslavia
