= Macedonian Language Day =

Macedonian Language Day (Macedonian: Ден на македонскиот јазик) is a working holiday in North Macedonia, observed annually on 5 May. On that day in 1945, the government of Yugoslav Macedonia adopted the Macedonian alphabet as the official script of the republic. Two months later, on 7 June, the Ministry of Education approved the first orthography and thus codified the Macedonian language.

The date was declared Macedonian Language Day at a government session held on 16 April 2019.
