= Day of the Macedonian Revolutionary Struggle =

National holiday on October 23

The Day of the Macedonian Revolutionary Struggle (Macedonian: Ден на македонската револуционерна борба), also known as Day of VMRO, is a national holiday which is celebrated on October 23 in North Macedonia. In 2007, the holiday was voted into law as a new national holiday. It is a non-working day.

== History ==
The holiday is celebrated on the occasion of the formation of the Internal Macedonian Revolutionary Organization (IMRO). It was established on October 23, 1893, in Ottoman Thessaloniki. The holiday was introduced in 2007 by the government of VMRO-DPMNE. "23 October" was also declared as a state award for "the highest acknowledgement of longstanding achievements in the field of science, culture, education, protection of state interests and promotion of state priorities, values and cultural-historic heritage of Macedonia".

=== Reception ===
In 2006, some Macedonian circles espoused the view that this celebration is related to the nationalist ideas of Greater Bulgaria supported by some leaders of the organization. When the holiday was introduced, the celebration of the holiday between Macedonian citizens was disputed, with some supporting it and others opposing it or not knowing. The Macedonian opposition at the time, led by Social Democratic Union of Macedonia, was against the celebration of the holiday because it considered it as a partisan holiday of VMRO-DPMNE. Macedonian historians welcomed the declaration of the day as a holiday, with historian Violeta Ačkoska stating that the holiday should be a symbol of Macedonian national reconciliation and Macedonian national unity. According to Macedonian writer and former governmental minister Dimitar Dimitrov, this public holiday determined according to the date of the foundation of an organization with the original name Bulgarian Macedonian-Adrianopolitan Revolutionary Committees, is unnecessary, arguing that it causes a surplus of holidays because IMRO is already represented in the holiday Republic Day. The Macedonian journalist Vasko Eftov, discussing the problems surrounding this holiday, claimed that IMRO was formed by people who identified as Bulgarians.

== See also ==
- Public holidays in North Macedonia
