= Day of the Macedonian Uprising =

Public holiday in North Macedonia

Day of the Macedonian Uprising Ден на македoнското востание
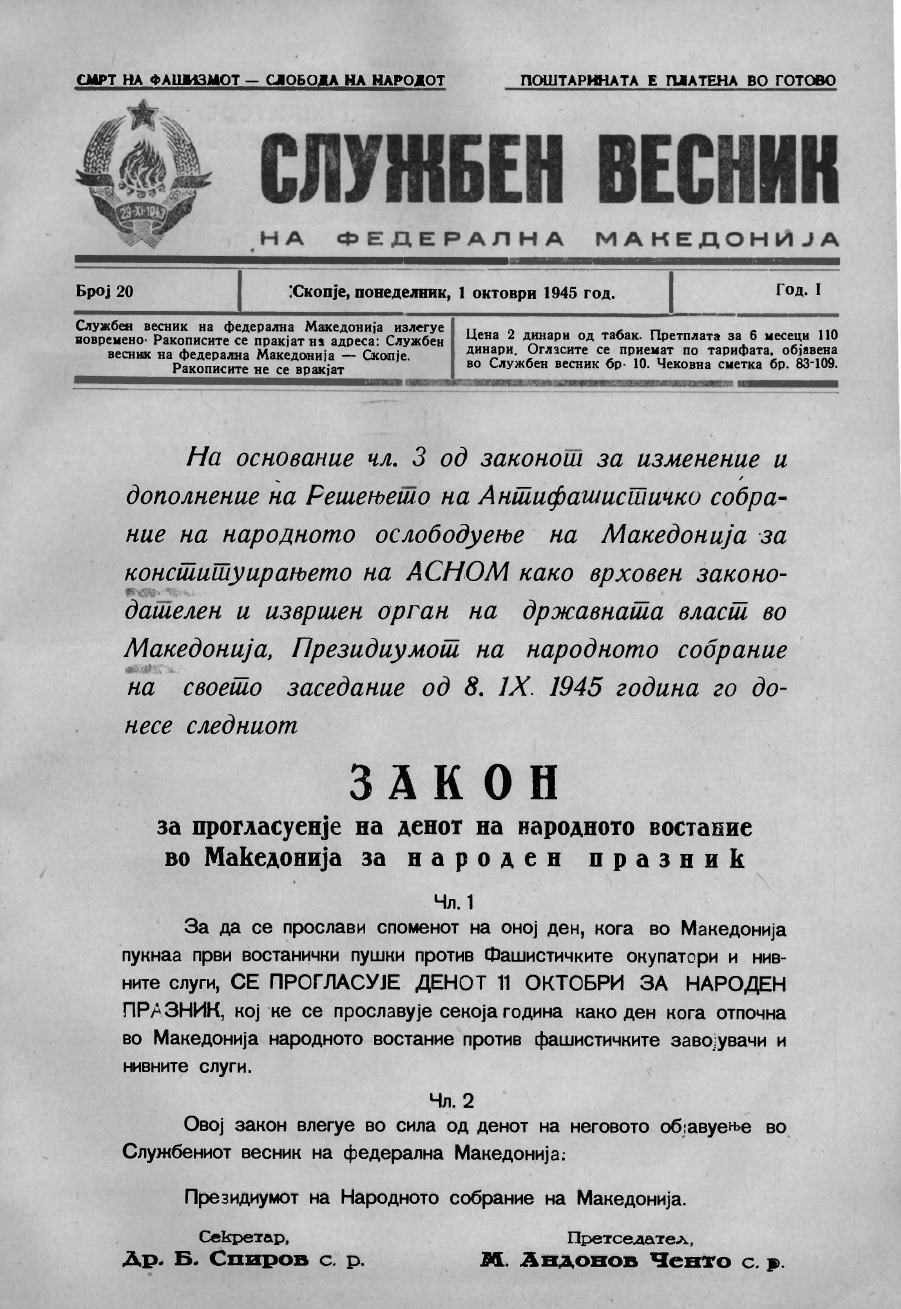
- Proclamation of 11 October as a national holiday in Democratic Federal Macedonia
- Also called: 11 October
- Observed by: North Macedonia
- Type: National
- Significance: The beginning of the uprising of the Macedonian people against fascism during World War II
- Celebrations: Gatherings, concerts, sports events, awards
- Date: October 11
- Next time: October 11, 2027
- Frequency: Annual

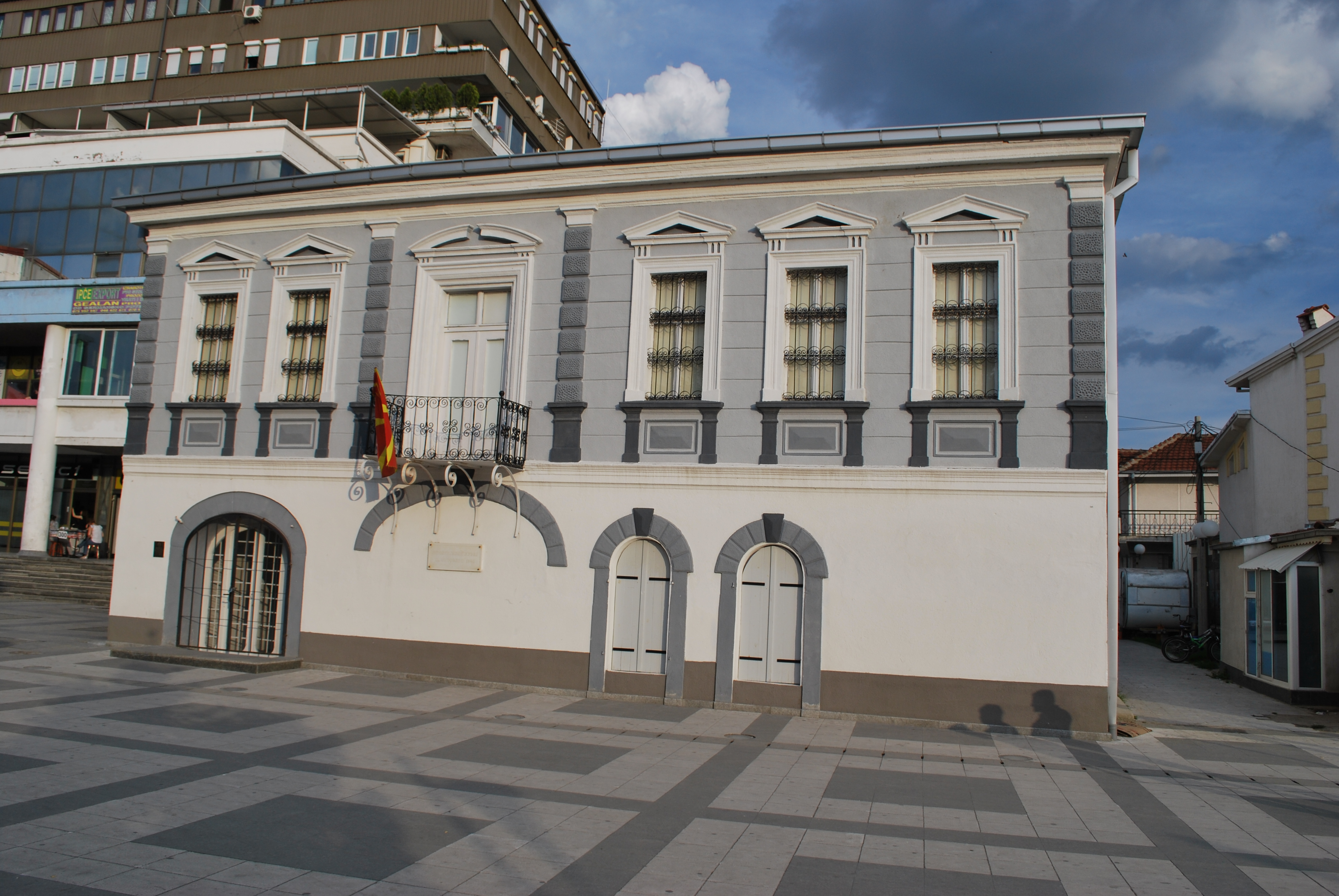
The building of the former Bulgarian police department in Prilep, today the Memorial Museum "October 11, 1941."

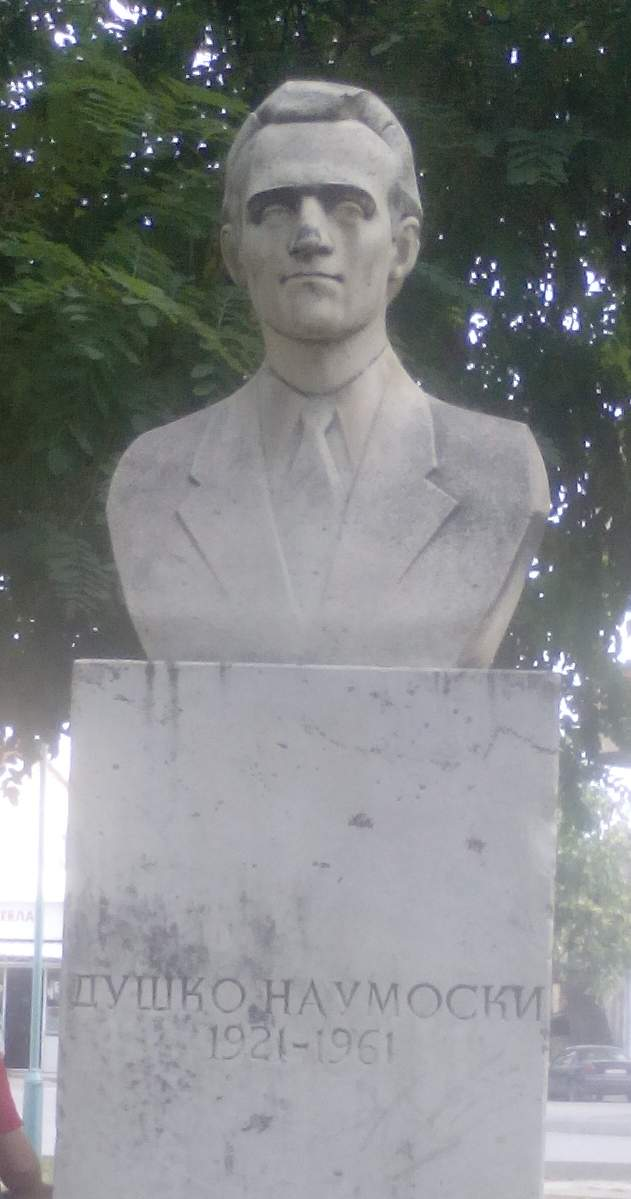
Bust-monument of Duško Naumovski in Prilep. He killed the Bulgarian guard during the night attack on October 11. The victim was his neighbor and friend of his father named Petar Kolev.

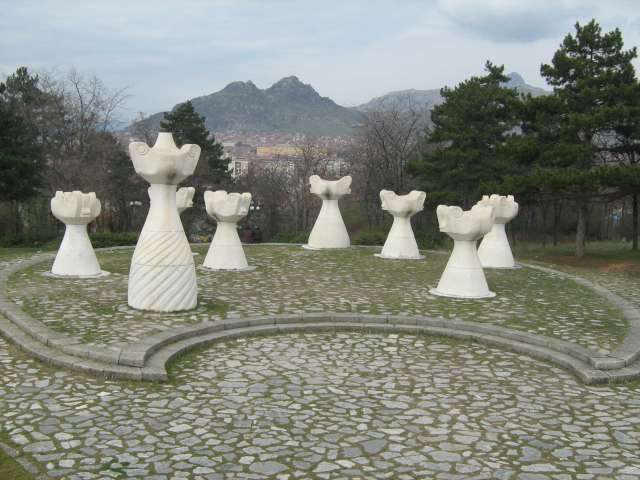
Burial Mound of the Unbeaten is a World War II memorial in the Park of the Revolution in Prilep built in 1961 in honor to the fallen Yugoslav partisans.

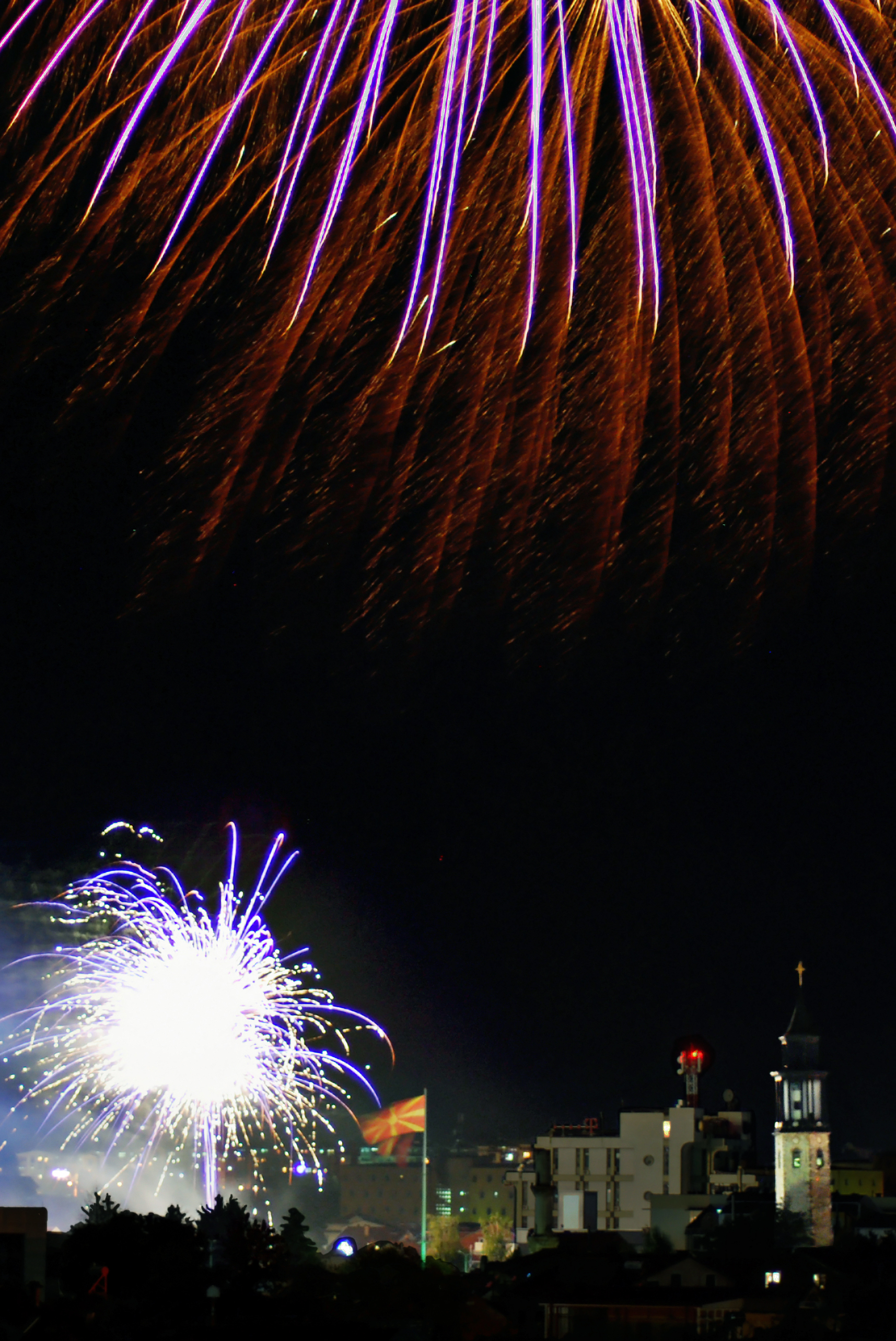
Celebration of the fest in Prilep.

Day of the Macedonian Uprising is a public holiday in North Macedonia, commemorating the beginning of the National Liberation Struggle against fascism during World War II in Yugoslav Macedonia, on October 11, 1941.

According to the Yugoslav Marxist historiography and the Macedonian historiography, the Macedonian uprising against fascism began on this day in 1941, lasting until late 1944. It has been celebrated as a national holiday since 1945 in then-Democratic Federal Macedonia as part of the Democratic Federal Yugoslavia.

Although this event was proclaimed a historical turning-point in Macedonian history, its results were unfavorable. The celebration of the holiday has been criticized by the Macedonian Patriotic Organization and in Bulgaria as anti-Bulgarian.

== Historical background ==
In April 1941, during the Second World War, the Axis powers invaded the Kingdom of Yugoslavia, of which today North Macedonia was part of. It encompassed most of the so-called Vardar Banovina, because the very name Macedonia was prohibited in the Kingdom of Yugoslavia. When Bulgarian Army entered Vardar Banovina in April 1941, the Bulgarian soldiers were greeted by the locals as liberators, while pro-Bulgarian and anti-Serbian feelings among them prevailed as a result of the previous suffering Serbianization. Despite this welcome, the Macedonians did not wish to become "fully fledged Bulgarians and annexed by Bulgaria, as Sofia assumed at the time". After the Bulgarian takeover the local communists fell in the sphere of influence of the Bulgarian Communist Party. Although they defined the Bulgarian forces as bourgeois-fascist, they tended not to see them as foreign occupiers. Initially, there was no organized resistance in the area, however resentment towards the Bulgarian regime began within months of the occupation as result of the oppressive Bulgarianization and centralization policy. The Macedonian Slavs were regarded by the authorities then as Bulgarians, and it is questionable to which extent they had any nationality.

On October 11, 1941, a group of Macedonian Partisans attacked several Bulgarian administration's objects in Prilep. These were 16 men, who in the evening, divided into three groups, attacked as follows: the first group - the police station, the second - the prison, and the third group eavesdropped on the telephone conversations, through a device connected to the telephone line, near the police precinct. Making a quick and surprise attack around 10 p.m, they opened fire on the post guard and the precinct. As a result of the attack, the watchman, who was a local staff member, was killed, and another policeman was wounded. The attackers then ran away. Immediately after the end of the attack, the town was blocked for a search for them.

The attack was ineffective and its participants were quickly arrested. Its leaders were imprisoned in Bulgaria until the end of the war. The activity of the local Communists did not pose any significant challenge for the regime then. Fascism in Bulgaria did not become a mass movement during WWII. In addition, up to one half of the Bulgarian army and police stationed in the area from 1941 to 1944 consisted of local conscripts. The resistances' power started to grow in 1943 with the capitulation of Italy and the Soviet victories over Nazi Germany, which turned the tide in the war. After the war, the area of present-day North Macedonia became part of Democratic Federal Yugoslavia, as Democratic Federal Macedonia (DFM). In 1945, the National Assembly of DFM passed a law declaring the day 11 October a public holiday of the state. It was celebrated for the first time on October 11, 1945. After the breakup of Yugoslavia, it was adopted as a public holiday again, after then Republic of Macedonia proclaimed its independence in 1991.

== Celebration and symbolism ==
After World War II, the Yugoslav historiography adopted the day as the beginning of the Macedonian uprising against fascism. After the fall of communism, the Macedonian historiography continued to regard the day as the beginning of the Macedonian anti-fascist resistance. Every year on October 11 there are official ceremonies, public speeches, and celebrations. There is an official award called 11 October, given out to Macedonian people who have contributed significantly to the national progress. The company FAS Sanos used to bear the name FAS "11. Oktomvri" AD Skopje. Some primary schools in North Macedonia are named "11 October".

== Criticism ==
=== Cold War development ===
During the Cold War, the celebration of this holiday was criticized by the United States-based Macedonian Patriotic Organization. In 1958, the MPO adopted a resolution proclaiming October 11 as a "Day of Mourning". This was only the first resolution of October 11 as a mourning day during the following decades. Since 1960, this day has been marked officially by the organization as "Mourning Day of Macedonia". In the same year, it was also celebrated by the MPO society in Brussels, Belgium. According to the MPO, the leaders of the Macedonian state, which it regarded as an enslaved banovina of Josip Broz Tito, renounced their native Bulgarian name on October 11. Ivan Mihailov, the last leader of Internal Macedonian Revolutionary Organization, also took an attitude against the holiday. In an article published in the newspaper Macedonian Tribune in 1973, he compared it to the Battle of Kleidion. Mihailov claimed that the Marxists, supported by their pro-Serbian anti-Bulgarian drive, have decided to blind spiritually one million Bulgarians in Macedonia by tampering with their past. The most massive celebration of the "Mourning Day of Macedonia" was in 1977, when the MPO sent a circular to all its divisions. It says: "We are obliged to make any sacrifices to eliminate the injustice done to our people after the Second World War". Whether the events that occurred on this date were the beginning of an uprising or whether the uprising was late were discussed even by some circles in Communist Yugoslavia.

=== 21st century ===
In Bulgaria, the celebration of this holiday became disputed. Bulgarian journalists and politicians claimed that the holiday is a celebration of hatred against Bulgaria itself, inherited from the times of Yugoslav communism. On October 11, 2020, Bulgarian MEP Andrey Kovatchev criticized Macedonian Prime Minister Zoran Zaev for celebrating 11 October, seeing it as an "anti-Bulgarian provocation".

== See also ==
- Public holidays in North Macedonia
- List of World War II monuments and memorials in North Macedonia
