= Markovi Kuli =

Castle in Prilep, North Macedonia

Markovi kuli Маркови кули
- near Prilep; North Macedonia
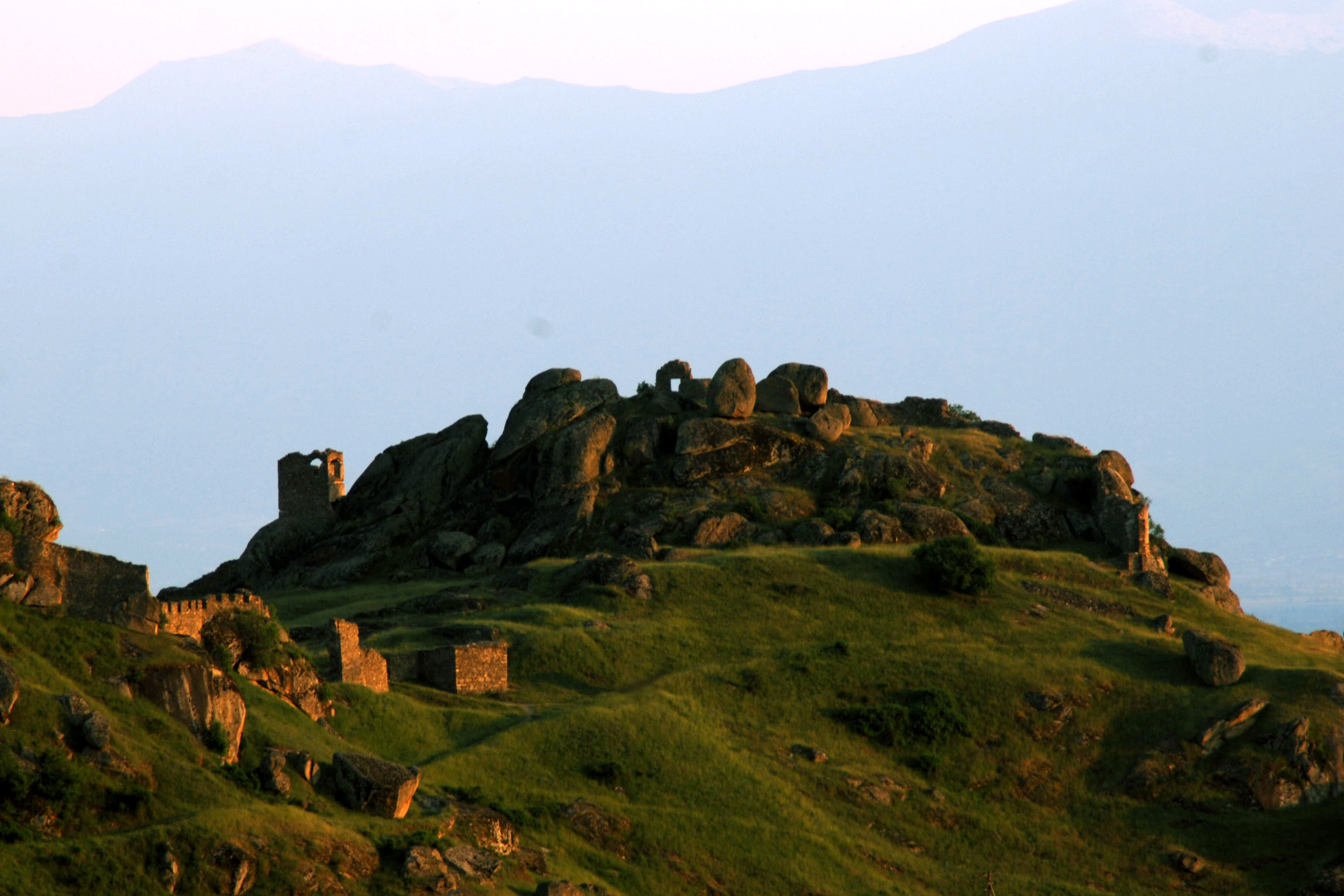
- View of the main citadel

Site information
- Type: Fortification
- Open to the public: Yes

Location
- Coordinates: 41°21′41.76″N 21°32′18.51″E

Site history
- Built by: Marko Mrnjavčević
- Materials: Stone

Markovi Kuli or Marko's Towers (Macedonian: Маркови Кули, Serbian: Маркове куле / Markove kule) are situated in the northwest of Prilep, North Macedonia, just above the neighbourhood of Varoš. The towers, named after Serbian medieval Prince Marko Mrnjavčević, are located on a 120–180 m high hill, surrounded by steep slopes covered with minute granite stones. The upper part of the former settlement can be reached from its north and south side.

The oldest remains on the site from the Hellenistic period, followed by Byzantine remains from the 5th and 6th centuries. Slavic settlement dates from the late 10th century. During the four-decade archaeological research, remnants indicating the existence of an early antique settlement — Keramija, were found. In the Roman period, this small village expanded into the southwest, a fact suggested by the several marble ornaments of an early Christian basilica.

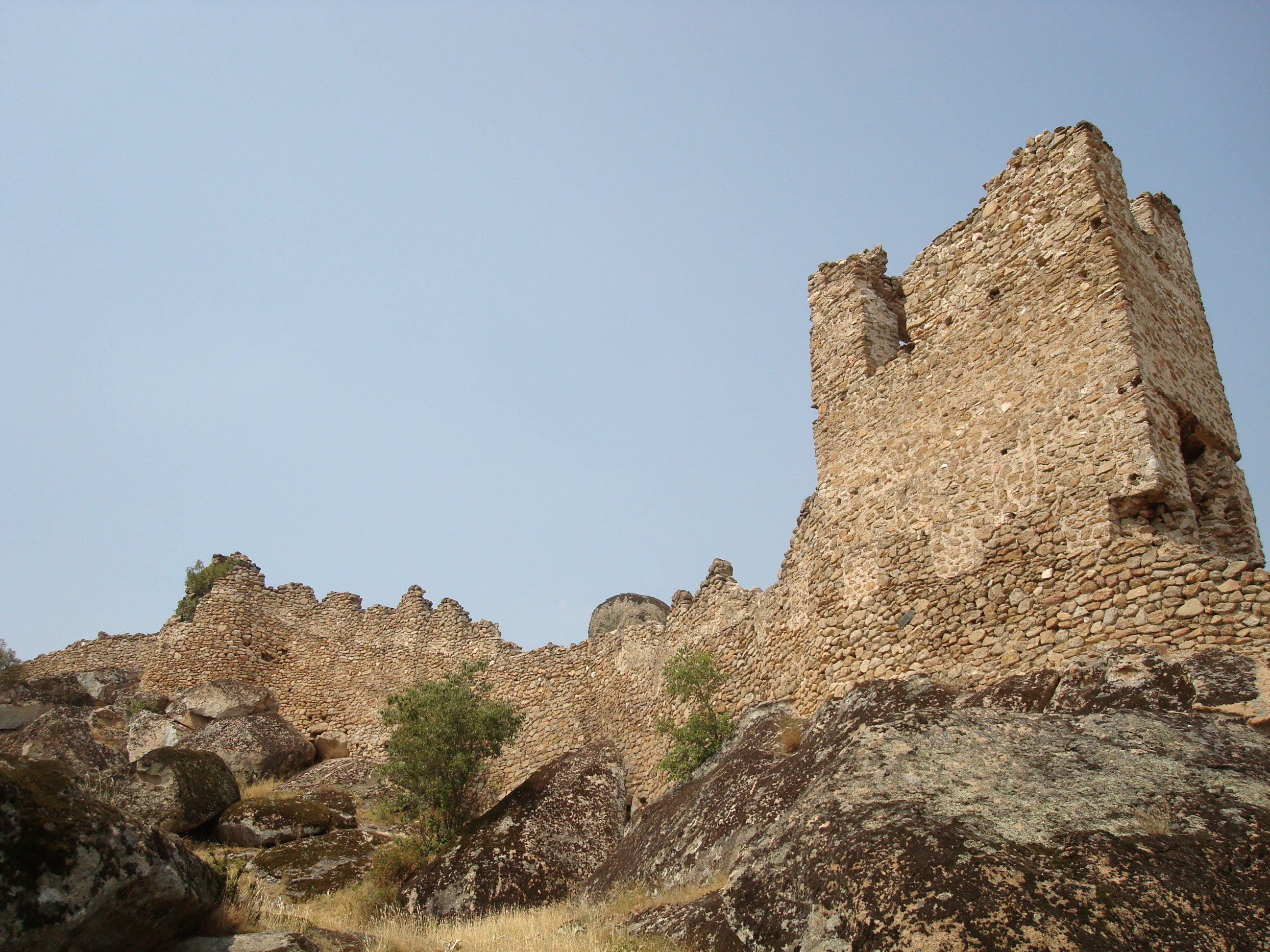
Ruins at Markovi Kuli

The rampart on this terrain dates from the 13th and 14th centuries and is in good condition. The walls are about one meter thick and were built of limestone mortar and rest upon the large limestone rocks.

Internal walls separated the acropolis into smaller areas. The palace of Serbian King Vukašin and his son Marko was also situated here. Its north gate has a compound foundation - an evidence for of numerous reconstructions of the space. According to some historical findings, until the second part of the 14th century and even later, this fortress was defended by only 40 soldiers.

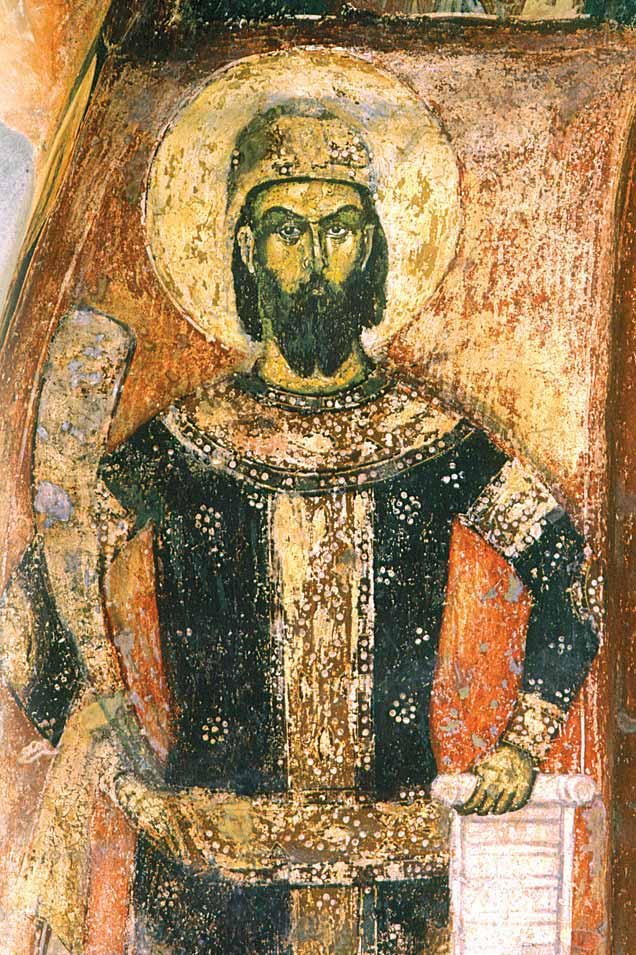
Prince Marko

The settlement was situated south of the acropolis on a surface of some 3,6 hectares. On its north side, there is a double gate, as well as a large guardhouse between the entrances. On the south wall there are three well-preserved towers.

The lowest zone of the rampart consists of a row of short walls drawn in a broken line. In the west side, there are graves inserted into the rock. In the 14th century, this part served as a temporary refuge of the local population from Turkish raids.

After the death of King Marko in 1395, this settlement was taken by Ottoman forces. At this time the inhabitants of the former settlement migrated to a new settlement at the foot of Marko's towers. It was separated into several quarters and each had its own church. This new settlement from the 14th century was given the name Varoš which is still in use today.
