= 11 October 1941 Memorial Museum =

Museum in Prilep, North Macedonia

Coordinates: 41.3450°N 21.5524°E

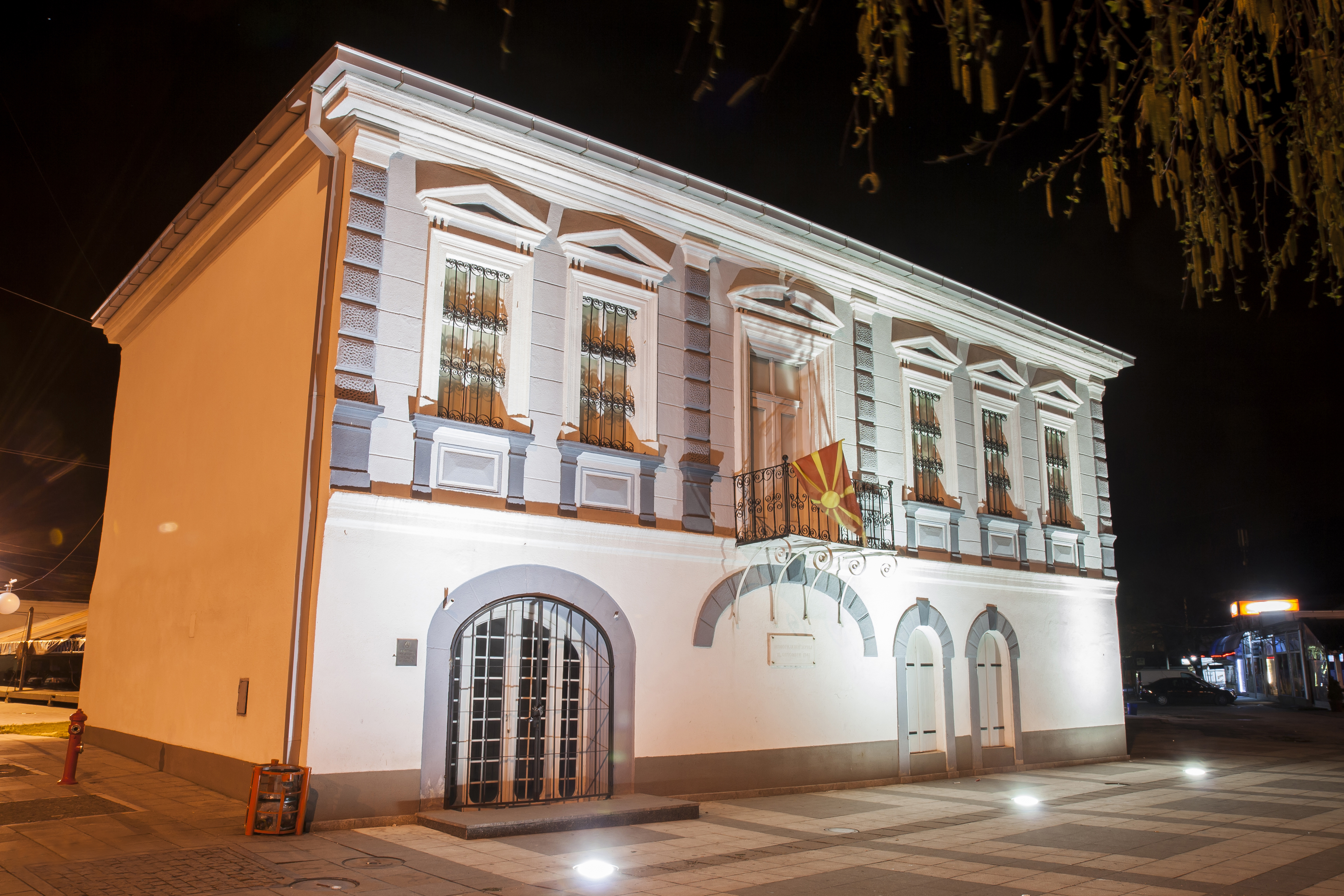
The 11 October 1941 Memorial Museum

The 11 October 1941 Memorial Museum (Macedonian: Меморијален музеј „11 Октомври“) is a museum in Prilep, North Macedonia, which commemorates the Day of the Macedonian Uprising. It is housed in the building upon which the Macedonian Partisans, of the Prilep detachment, made their first attack as part of World War II in Yugoslav Macedonia, also known as the National Liberation War of Macedonia. The building was in use at this time as a Bulgarian police station.

Built in the early 20th century, the building is located in the Prilep city center and is listed as an Object of Cultural Heritage by the Ministry of Culture. While its original purpose is unknown, it served as a high school and a wine cellar prior to World War II. Its use as a museum dedicated to the fight against fascism started on 1 May 1952 during the Yugoslav era, with its first major expansion occurring in 1961. The museum contains various documents, sketches, maps, weapons and other artefacts on the subject.

The building was renovated from April to October 2011 with funds from the Ministry of Culture of the Republic of Macedonia and Prilep Municipality, with a re-opening event occurring on and around 11 October to commemorate 70 years since the uprising. The then-Minister of Culture Elizabeta Kančeska-Milevska and then-Mayor of Prilep Municipality Marjan Risteski lead the festivities, including the unveiling of a monument of Kuzman Josifovski Pitu.
