= Varoš, Prilep =

Coordinates: 41.3567°N 21.5322°E

Varoš Варош
- Village
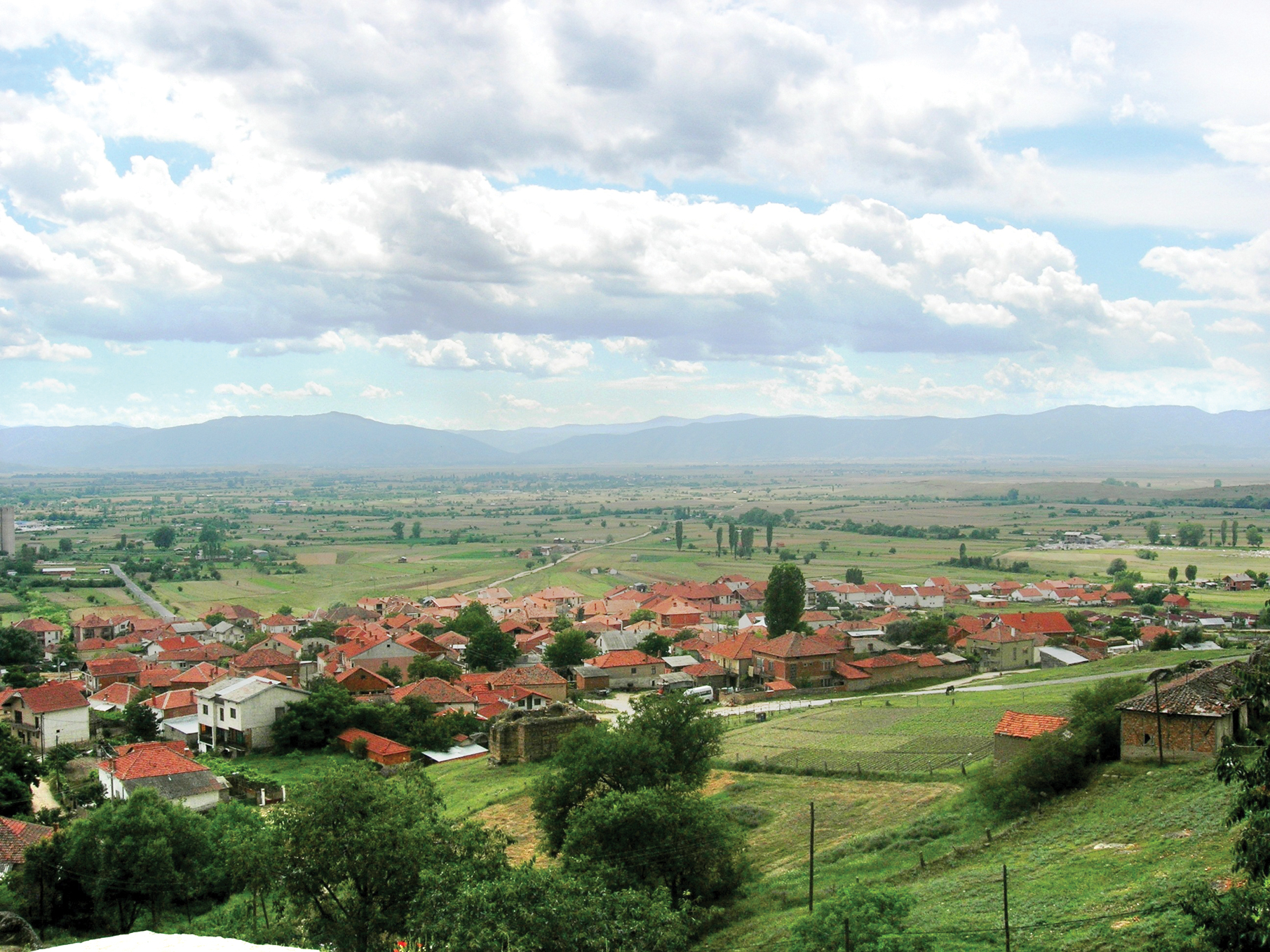
- Aerial view of the village
- Interactive map of Varoš
- Country: North Macedonia
- Municipality: Prilep
- Elevation: 650 m (2,130 ft)
- Time zone: UTC+1 (CET)
- Area code: +389/48/4XXXXX

Varoš (Macedonian: Варош) is a part of Prilep, 20 years ago, this used to be a village, until it joined Prilep, making it the only former village in Prilep to be inhabited.

It is said that Varoš had 77 churches at the end of the 18th century, with just seven surviving to the end of the 19th century.
