= List of Macedonian presidential candidates =

The following is a list of Macedonian presidential candidates. It contains information concerning the names, parties, and respective years of the candidates for the position of President of North Macedonia.

== Candidates for President of Republic of Macedonia ==
Name	Party	Year
Ljubisha Georgievski	VMRO–DPMNE	1994
Kiro Gligorov	Social Democratic Union	1994
Tito Petkovski	Social Democratic Union	1999
Vasil Tupurkovski	Democratic Alternative	1999
Stojan Andov	Liberal Party of Macedonia	1999
Muhamed Halili	Party for Democratic Prosperity	1999
Muharem Nëxhipi	Democratic Party of Albanians	1999
Zidi Xhelili	Democratic Party of Albanians	2004
Gëzim Ostreni	Democratic Union for Integration	2004
Saško Kedev	VMRO–DPMNE	2004
Branko Crvenkovski	Social Democratic Union	2004
Ljubomir Frčkoski	Social Democratic Union	2009
Gjorge Ivanov	VMRO–DPMNE	2009
Stevo Pendarovski	Social Democratic Union	2014
Gordana Siljanovska-Davkova	VMRO–DPMNE	2019
