= List of political parties in North Macedonia =

North Macedonia has a multi-party system, with numerous parties which must work with each other to form coalition governments.

== Parties in the Parliament ==
Party/Coalition		Ideology	Leader	Assembly
Your; Macedonia	VMRO–DPMNE; ВМРО–ДПМНЕ	Macedonian nationalism; National conservatism	Hristijan Mickoski	55 / 120
Your; Macedonia	Socialist Party of Macedonia; Социјалистичка партија на Македонија	Democratic socialism; Social democracy	Ljupco Dimovski	2 / 120
Your; Macedonia	Democratic Party of Serbs in Macedonia; Демократска странка Срба у Македонији	Serb interests	Ivan Stoilković	1 / 120
For a European; Future	Social Democratic Union of Macedonia; Социјалдемократски сојуз на Македонија	Social democracy; Social liberalism	Venko Filipče	15 / 120
For a European; Future	New Social Democratic Party; Нова социјалдемократска партија	Social democracy; Pro-Europeanism	Goran Misovski	2 / 120
For a European; Future	Liberal Democratic Party; Либерално-демократска партија	Social liberalism	Monika Zajkova	1 / 120
European; Front	Democratic Union for Integration; Bashkimi Demokratik për Integrim	Albanian interests; Pro-Europeanism	Ali Ahmeti	10 / 120
European; Front	Alliance for Albanians–Sela; Aleanca për Shqiptarët–Sela	Conservatism; Albanian interests	Ziadin Sela	4 / 120
European; Front	Democratic Party of Turks; Makedonya Türk Demokratik Partisi	Turkish interests	Beycan İlyas	1 / 120
European; Front	People's Movement; Lëvizja Populli	Albanian interests	Skender Rexhepi Zejd	1 / 120
European; Front	Macedonian Turkish Movement Party; Makedonya Türk Hareket Partisi	Turkish interests	Enes Ibrahim	1 / 120
VLEN; Koalicioni Vlen		Conservatism; Albanian interests	Bilal Kasami; Izet Mexhiti	11 / 120
The Left; Левица		Socialism; Left-wing nationalism	Dimitar Apasiev	6 / 120
For Our Macedonia; За наша Македонија		Macedonian nationalism; Left-wing nationalism	Maksim Dimitrievski	6 / 120
Alliance for Albanians–Taravari; Aleanca për Shqiptarët–Taravari		Conservatism; Albanian interests	Arben Taravari	3 / 120
Democratic Party of Albanians; Partia Demokratike e Shqiptarëve		Albanian interests; Populism; Conservatism	Menduh Thaçi	1 / 120

== Extra-parliamentary parties ==
Macedonian:

- VMRO – People's Party (ВМРО - Народна Партија), with the SDSM
- Democratic Renewal of Macedonia (Демократска обнова на Македонија), with SDSM
- Democratic Union (Демократски сојуз), with VMRO-DPMNE
- Party of United Democrats of Macedonia (Партија на обединети демократи на Македонија), with VMRO-DPMNE
- Macedonian Concept (Македонски Концепт), with VMRO-DPMNE
- United for Macedonia (Обединети за Македонија), with VMRO-DPMNE
- Voice for Macedonia (Глас за Македонија), with VMRO-DPMNE
- Macedonian Action/MAAK-Conservative Party (МААК-Конзервативна Партија), with VMRO-DPMNE
- Macedonian Progressive Party (Македонска Напредна Партија), with VMRO-DPMNE
- Union of Tito's Left Forces (Сојуз на Титови Леви Сили), with VMRO-DPMNE
- Communist Party of Macedonia (Kомунистичката партија на Македонија), with The Left
- Citizen Option for Macedonia (Граѓанска опција за Македонија), with Brave for Macedonia
- Integra-Macedonian Conservative Party (Интегра-македонска конзервативна партија), with Brave for Macedonia GROM
- United Macedonia (political party) (Единствена Македонија)
- Homeland Macedonia (Homeland Macedonia)
- Social Democratic Party of Macedonia (Социјалдемократска партија на Македонија)
- YOUR Political Party (ТВОЈА партија), independent.
- Party for European Future (Партија за Европска Иднина), with the SDSM
- Party of United Pensioners and Citizens (Партија на пензионери), with the SDSM
- Permanent Macedonian Radical Unification (Трајно македонско радикално обединување, TMRO)
- Fatherland's Macedonian Organisation for Radical Renewal–Vardar–Aegean–Pirin (Татковинска македонска организација за радикална обнова - Вардар - Егеј - Пирин, TMORO-VEP), with VMRO-DPMNE
- Green Humane City (Зелен хуман град)

Albanian:

- National Democratic Revival (Rilindja Demokratike Kombëtare/Национална Демократска Преродба)
- Party for Democratic Prosperity (Partija za demokratski prosperitet/Партија за демократски просперитет)

Minority:

- Democratic Union of the Vlachs of Macedonia (Unia Democratã a Armãnjlor dit Machidunii/Демократски сојуз на Власите од Македонија)
- Party of the Vlachs of Macedonia (Partia Armãnjilor ditu Machidunie/Партија на Власите од Македонија), with VMRO-DPMNE
- Party for the Movement of Turks in Macedonia (Türk Hareket Partisi/Партија за движење на Турците, PDT)
- Movement for Turkish National Union (Türk Milli Birlik Hareketi/Движење за Турско Национално Единство)
- Bosniak People's Party (Bošnjačka narodna stranka/Бошњачка народна партија)
- Democratic League of Bosniaks (Demokratski Savez Bošnjaka/Демократска Лига на Бошњаците)
- Union of Roma in Macedonia (Сојуз на Ромите од Македонија)
- United Party of Roma in Macedonia (Обединета партија на Ромите во Македонија)
- Party for the Full Emancipation of the Roma of Macedonia (Партија за целосна еманципација на Ромите), with Brave for Macedonia GROM
- Democratic Forces of the Roma (Демократски сили на Ромите)
- Serbian Progressive Party in Macedonia (Srpska Napredna Stranka u Makedoniji/Српска напредна странка во Македонија), with VMRO-DPMNE
- Serbian Party in Macedonia (Srpska Stranka u Makedoniji/Српска странка во Македонија)

== Defunct parties ==
- Alliance for the Albanians-Fetaj (Aleanca për Shqiptarët-Fetaj)
- Alternative (Alternativa)
- Besa Movement (Lëvizja Besa)
- Democratic Alternative (Demokratska Alternativa/Демократска Алтернатива)
- Democratic Centre (Demokratski centar/Демократски Центар)
- Democratic Movement (Lëvizja Demokratike)
- Communist Party of Macedonia (Sojuz na Komunistite na Makedonija/Сојуз на комунистите на Македонија)
- Liberal Party of Macedonia (Либерална Партија на Македонија)
- National Democratic Party (Nacionala Demokratska Partija/Национална Демократска Партија)
- New Democracy (Demokracia e Re/Nova Demokratija/Нова Демократија)
- Self-determination Movement in North Macedonia (Vetëvendosje)
- Workers' Party (Rabotnicka Partija/Работничка Партија)
- Party of Free Democrats (Partija na Sloboni Demokrati/Партија на слободни демократи)

== See also ==
- Politics of North Macedonia
- List of political parties by country
- Liberalism in North Macedonia
