= 2002 Macedonian parliamentary election =

← 1998	15 September 2002	2006 →
- All 120 seats in the Assembly; 61 seats needed for a majority
Party	Leader	Vote %	Seats
Together for Macedonia	Branko Crvenkovski	41.40	60
VMRO-DPMNE–Liberal	Ljubčo Georgievski	25.02	33
BDI	Ali Ahmeti	12.13	16
PDSh	Arbën Xhaferi	5.33	7
PDP	Imeri Imeri	2.38	2
National Democratic	Kastriot Haxhirexha	2.20	1
Union of Roma	Amdi Bajram	0.59	1
This lists parties that won seats. See the complete results below.
Prime Minister before	Prime Minister after election
Ljubčo Georgievski; VMRO-DPMNE	Branko Crvenkovski; SDSM

Parliamentary elections were held in Macedonia on 15 September 2002. The result was a victory for the Together for Macedonia, an alliance of the Social Democratic Union of Macedonia, the Liberal Democratic Party, the Democratic Party of Turks, the Democratic League of Bosniaks, the United Party of Romas in Macedonia, the Democratic Party of Serbs, the Democratic Union of the Vlachs of Macedonia, the Workers-Peasant Party, the Socialist Christian Party of Macedonia and the Green Party of Macedonia, which won 60 of the 120 seats in the Assembly.

== Electoral system ==
A new electoral law was passed prior to the election, replacing the system in which 35 members of the Assembly were elected by proportional representation at the national level and 85 elected in single member constituencies. In the new system, the country was divided into six constituencies that elected 20 members each by proportional representation. Seats were allocated using the d'Hondt method with an electoral threshold of 5%.

== Results ==
Party	Votes	%	Seats
Together for Macedonia	494,744	41.42	60
VMRO-DPMNE–Liberal Party	298,404	24.98	33
Democratic Union for Integration	144,913	12.13	16
Democratic Party of Albanians	63,695	5.33	7
Party for Democratic Prosperity	28,397	2.38	2
National Democratic Party	26,237	2.20	1
Socialist Party of Macedonia	25,976	2.17	0
Democratic Alternative	17,473	1.46	0
Democratic Union	15,099	1.26	0
VMRO-Macedonia	10,436	0.87	0
VMRO-VMRO–DPPESM–MHP	8,484	0.71	0
Union of Roma in Macedonia	7,036	0.59	1
New Democracy	6,172	0.52	0
LD–DSSM–PVM–DMP–PDDE–SDAM	6,062	0.51	0
Democratic Centre–Party of the Greens	6,019	0.50	0
Social Democratic Party	3,493	0.29	0
Macedonian Alliance–Macedonian People's Party	2,454	0.21	0
Democratic Party of Macedonia	2,326	0.19	0
Rebirth and Alliance for a Macedonian National Ideal	2,303	0.19	0
People's Movement of Macedonia	2,247	0.19	0
MAAK–The Only Macedonian Option	2,208	0.18	0
Republican Party of Macedonia	2,167	0.18	0
Party for the Full Emancipation of the Roma of Macedonia	2,149	0.18	0
DOM–Party of Pensioners	2,077	0.17	0
Communist Party of Macedonia	1,969	0.16	0
People's Will	1,262	0.11	0
Party for Justice	1,139	0.10	0
Progressive Party	924	0.08	0
All-Macedonian Workers' Party	309	0.03	0
Democratic Party "Go Macedonia–Forza"	273	0.02	0
United Party of Romas in Macedonia	239	0.02	0
VMRO-United	120	0.01	0
Bosniak Democratic Party	45	0.00	0
Independents	7,571	0.63	0
Total	1,194,422	100.00	120
Valid votes	1,194,422	97.69	
Invalid/blank votes	28,289	2.31	
Total votes	1,222,711	100.00	
Registered voters/turnout	1,664,296	73.47	
Source: Nohlen & Stöver
