= 1994 Macedonian general election =

- Presidential election
- 16 October 1994
- Turnout: 76.65%
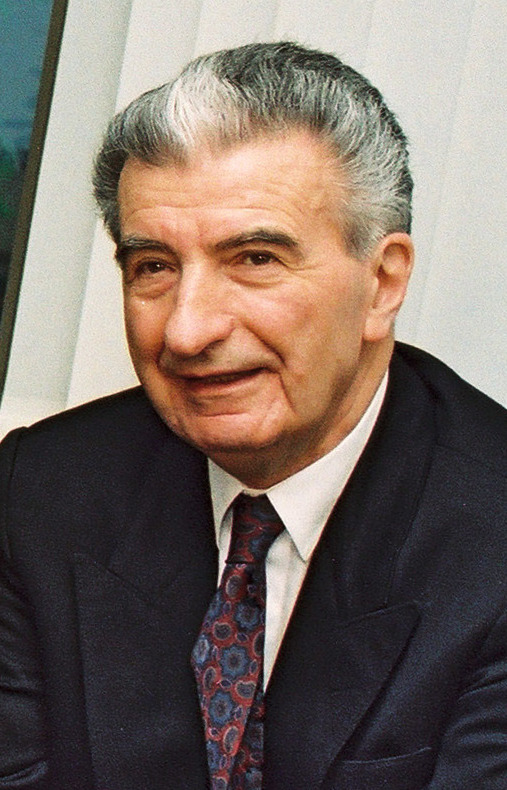

Candidate	Kiro Gligorov	Ljubiša Georgievski
Party	Alliance for Macedonia	VMRO-DPMNE
Popular vote	715,087	197,109
Percentage	78.39%	21.61%
President before election
Kiro Gligorov
Independent
Elected President
Kiro Gligorov
Independent
- Assembly election
- 16 October 1994 (first round); 30 October 1994 (second round)
Party	Leader	Seats	+/–
Alliance for Macedonia (Note: Consisting of the Social Democratic Union of Macedonia (58 seats), the Liberal Party of Macedonia (29) and the Socialist Party of Macedonia (8))	Branko Crvenkovski	95	+64
PDP	Abduladi Vejseli	10	−7
NDP	Iljaz Halimi	4	+3
DPM		1	+1
SDPM		1	+1
PCERM	Faik Abdi	1	0
DPTM–SDA-IP	Erdogan Saraç	1	+1
Independents	–	7	+4
This lists parties that won seats. See the complete results below.
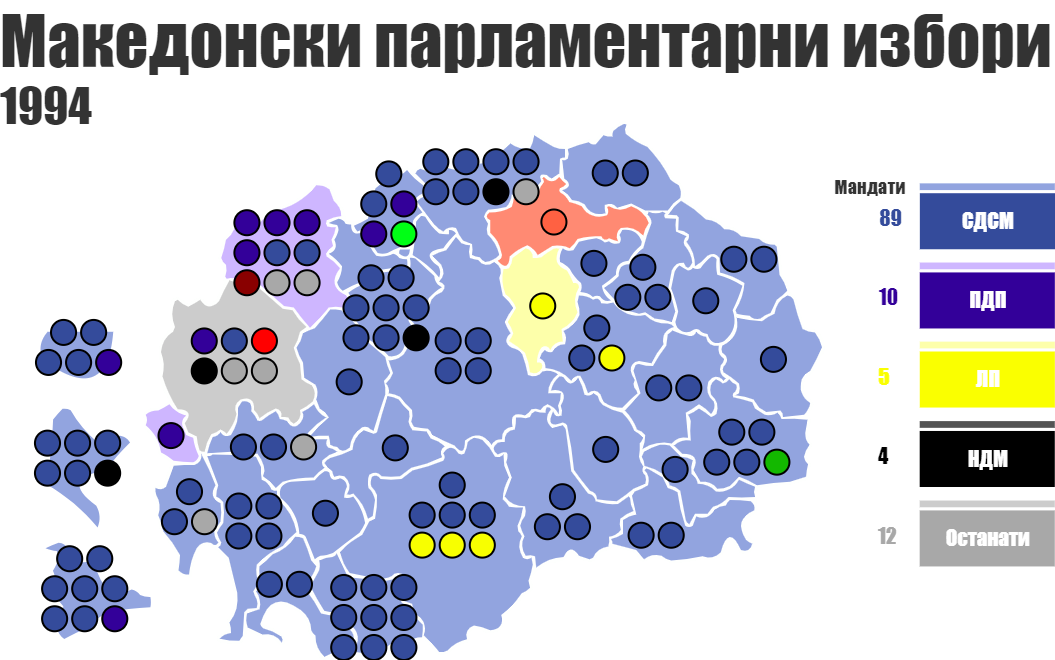
Results by constituency
Prime Minister before	Prime Minister after
Branko Crvenkovski; SDSM	Branko Crvenkovski; SDSM

General elections were held in Macedonia on 16 October 1994 to elect a President and Assembly, with a second round of Assembly elections on 30 October. The presidential election was won by Kiro Gligorov of the Alliance for Macedonia (a coalition of the Social Democratic Union, Liberal Party and the Socialist Party), whilst the parties forming Alliance for Macedonia also won the Assembly elections with 95 of the 120 seats. However, the second round of the Assembly elections were boycotted by VMRO-DPMNE and the Democratic Party, as they claimed there had been irregularities in the first round.

== Electoral system ==
The 120 members of the Assembly were elected in 120 single-member constituencies. If no candidate received over 50% in the first round, a second round was held and contested by every candidate who received over 7% of the vote in the first round. In the second round a majority was not required, and the candidate who received the most votes won the seat.

== Results ==
=== President ===
Candidate	Party	Votes	%
Kiro Gligorov	Alliance for Macedonia	715,087	78.39
Ljubiša Georgievski	VMRO-DPMNE	197,109	21.61
Total		912,196	100.00
Valid votes		912,196	87.46
Invalid/blank votes		130,810	12.54
Total votes		1,043,006	100.00
Registered voters/turnout		1,360,729	76.65
Source: State Electoral Commission

=== Assembly ===
Of the 88 seats won by joint lists of the Social Democratic Union, Liberal Party and Socialist Party, the Social Democratic Union won 57, the Liberal Party 24 and the Socialist Party seven.

Party	First round		Second round		Seats
Party	Votes	%	Votes	%	Seats
Alliance for Macedonia (SDSM–LPM–SPM)	291,695	29.49	329,700	48.50	87
VMRO-DPMNE	141,494	14.30	32,838	4.83	0
Democratic Party	108,872	11.01	30,928	4.55	0
Party for Democratic Prosperity	87,103	8.81	93,407	13.74	10
People's Democratic Party	29,361	2.97	25,007	3.68	4
Democratic Party of Macedonia	20,243	2.05	3,991	0.59	1
Liberal Party	15,068	1.52	21,362	3.14	5
Workers Party	15,416	1.56			0
Democratic Party of Turks	14,423	1.46	6,434	0.95	0
Social Democratic Party	12,055	1.22	2,254	0.33	1
Movement for All-Macedonian Action	11,479	1.16	2,013	0.30	0
VMRO-DP	9,742	0.98	458	0.07	0
League of Communists of Macedonia	7,610	0.77			0
VMRO-MNDS	7,167	0.72	1,191	0.18	0
Party of Democratic Action–Islamic Path	6,912	0.70	2,155	0.32	0
Socialist Party	6,612	0.67	5,632	0.83	1
Party for the Full Emancipation of the Roma	6,530	0.66	4,447	0.65	1
Workers Party of Macedonia	5,435	0.55			0
Democratic Party of Serbs	5,290	0.53	4,003	0.59	0
Communist Party of Macedonia	5,161	0.52			0
VMRO-Fatherland	5,133	0.52			0
Democratic Union–Party of Peasants	5,089	0.51	681	0.10	0
Social Democratic Union	4,182	0.42	4,635	0.68	1
Christian Democratic Party	4,019	0.41			0
SDSM–LPM	3,945	0.40	5,674	0.83	1
DPTM–SDA-IP	3,467	0.35	4,681	0.69	1
Agricultural Workers Party	3,362	0.34			0
SDSM–SP	2,538	0.26	2,872	0.42	0
Party of the Unemployed	2,191	0.22			0
Civic Liberal Party	2,019	0.20			0
Party of Yugoslavs	1,570	0.16			0
Republican Party	1,272	0.13			0
VMRO - Obedineta	943	0.10			0
Democratic Union of Educators and Citizens	822	0.08			0
Party of Social Truth	724	0.07			0
Macedonian National Party	715	0.07			0
Democratic Progressive Party	676	0.07			0
New Communist Movement	633	0.06			0
VMRO-Gotse Delchev	480	0.05			0
Democratic Party of Yugoslavs	422	0.04			0
DP–New Social Democratic Party	386	0.04			0
Republican Party–VMRO-Gotse Delchev	205	0.02			0
Multinational People's Party	151	0.02			0
Independents	136,511	13.80	95,418	14.04	7
Total	989,123	100.00	679,781	100.00	120
Valid votes	989,123	94.79	679,781	96.24	
Invalid/blank votes	54,330	5.21	26,580	3.76	
Total votes	1,043,453	100.00	706,361	100.00	
Registered voters/turnout	1,487,367	70.15	1,293,330	54.62	
Source: Nohlen & Stöver, Slavic Studies Centre
