= 1998 Macedonian parliamentary election =

- 18 October 1998 (first round); 1 November 1998 (second round)
- All 120 seats in the Assembly; 61 seats needed for a majority
Party	Leader	Seats	+/–
VMRO-DPMNE	Ljubčo Georgievski	49	+49
SDSM	Branko Crvenkovski	27	−31
PPD	Abdurrahman Aliti	14	+4
DA	Vasil Tupurkovski	13	New
PDSh	Arbën Xhaferi	11	New
LDP – DPM	Petar Gošev	4	−26
SPM	Ljubisav Ivanov-Dzingo	1	−7
Union of Roma	Amdi Bajram	1	+1
This lists parties that won seats. See the complete results below.
Prime Minister before	Prime Minister after election
Branko Crvenkovski; SDSM	Ljubčo Georgievski; VMRO-DPMNE

Parliamentary elections were held in Macedonia on 18 October 1998, with a second round on 1 November. VMRO-DPMNE emerged as the largest party, winning 49 of the 120 seats, and later formed a coalition government with Democratic Alternative and the Democratic Party of Albanians.

== Electoral system ==
A new electoral law was passed prior to the election, replacing the system in which 120 members of the Assembly were elected in single-member constituencies, with one in which 35 were elected by proportional representation at the national level, and 85 elected in single member constituencies. In the single-member constituencies, candidates had to receive 50% of votes cast and 33% of the total number of registered voters to win in the first round. If no candidate achieved this requirement, a second round was held between the two candidates with the most votes.

This was the only election to use this system. Prior to the 2002 elections it was replaced by a system in which the country was divided into six constituencies that elected 20 members each by proportional representation.

== Results ==
Party	Proportional			Constituency (first round)			Constituency (second round)			Total seats
Party	Votes	%	Seats	Votes	%	Seats	Votes	%	Seats	Total seats
VMRO-DPMNE	312,669	28.10	11	6,927	0.63	0	8,195	1.06	0	11
Social Democratic Union of Macedonia	279,799	25.14	10	278,766	25.19	4	273,193	35.31	13	27
PPD–DPA	214,360	19.26	8							8
Democratic Alternative	119,352	10.73	4	6,907	0.62	0				4
LDP–DPM	77,788	6.99	2	116,190	10.50	0	34,766	4.49	2	4
SPM–PCERM–DPT–DPPRM–SDAM	52,284	4.70	0	10,962	0.99	0	3,679	0.48	0	0
Democratic Party of Serbs in Macedonia	14,930	1.34	0							0
VMRO-DOM	11,577	1.04	0	3,167	0.29	0				0
Party of Pensioners	5,970	0.54	0	277	0.03	0				0
MAAK-KP–MA–DP	5,596	0.50	0	8,376	0.76	0				0
VMRO-DP	3,746	0.34	0	9,050	0.82	0				0
Civil-Liberal Party of Macedonia	3,393	0.30	0	430	0.04	0				0
League of Communists of Macedonia	2,756	0.25	0	2,997	0.27	0				0
Socialist Christian Party of Macedonia	2,186	0.20	0	1,120	0.10	0				0
Communist Party of Macedonia	2,058	0.18	0	1,828	0.17	0				0
Workers Party	1,528	0.14	0	818	0.07	0				0
VMRO-DPMNE–Democratic Alternative				369,615	33.40	6	373,001	48.21	41	47
Party for Democratic Prosperity				132,430	11.97	9	18,153	2.35	1	10
Socialist Party of Macedonia				60,542	5.47	1	12,534	1.62	0	1
Democratic Party of Albanians				53,469	4.83	3	28,361	3.67	4	7
Union of Roma in Macedonia				3,577	0.32	0	7,294	0.94	1	1
SDSM–SDPM				9,411	0.85	0				0
Party for Democratic Action – True Path				5,744	0.52	0	4,744	0.61	0	0
Democratic Party of Turks				3,933	0.36	0				0
VMRO-DPMNE–DA–League for Democracy				3,615	0.33	0	4,695	0.61	0	0
PDP–NDP				1,653	0.15	0				0
Republican Party of People's Unity				1,338	0.12	0				0
SPM–PCERM–DPT–DPPRM				813	0.07	0				0
Democratic Progressive Party of the Roma from Macedonia				426	0.04	0				0
Democratic Party				347	0.03	0				0
MAAK – Conservative Party				196	0.02	0				0
Social Democratic Party of Macedonia				142	0.01	0				0
SPM–DPT–SDAM				84	0.01	0				0
Independents	2,762	0.25	0	11,398	1.03	0	5,128	0.66	0	0
Total	1,112,754	100.00	35	1,106,548	100.00	23	773,743	100.00	62	120
Valid votes	1,112,754	97.06		1,106,548	97.54		773,743	98.16		
Invalid/blank votes	33,755	2.94		27,946	2.46		14,481	1.84		
Total votes	1,146,509	100.00		1,134,494	100.00		788,224	100.00		
Registered voters/turnout	1,572,976	72.89		1,572,976	72.12		1,142,926	68.97		
Source: Slavic Research Centre, Sobranie
