= 1999 Macedonian presidential election =

- 31 October 1999 (first round); 14 November 1999 (second round)
- Turnout: 65.12% (first round); 69.10% (second round)
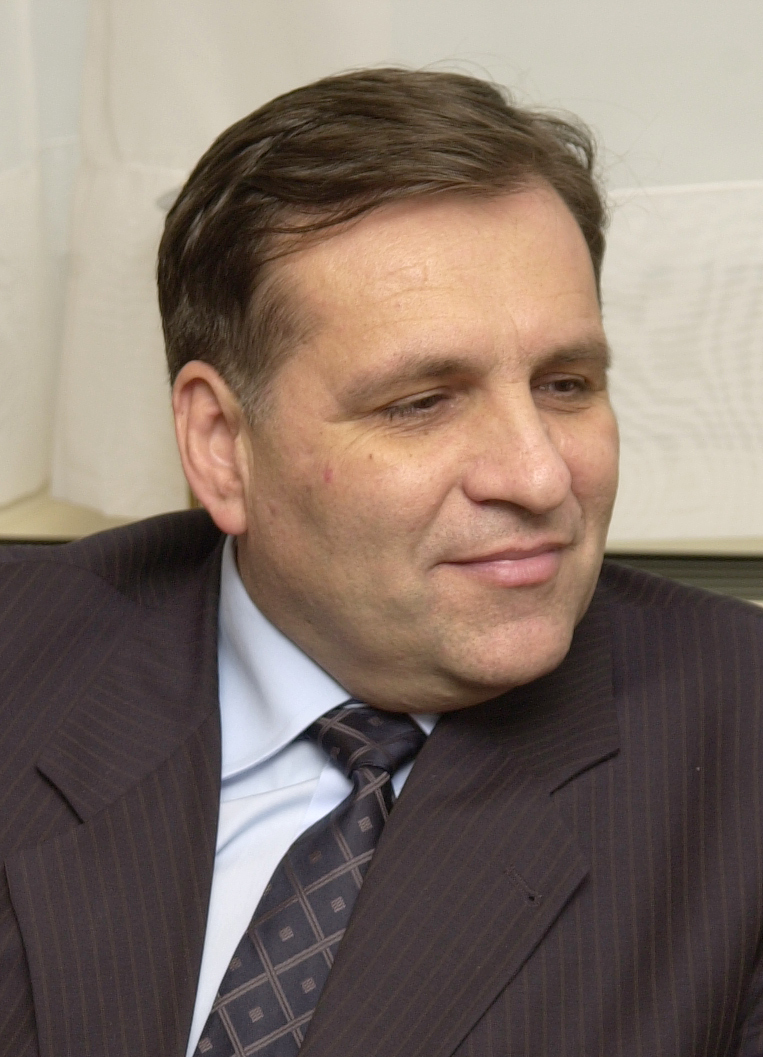

Nominee	Boris Trajkovski	Tito Petkovski
Party	VMRO-DPMNE	SDSM
Popular vote	582,808	513,614
Percentage	53.16%	46.84%
President before election
Kiro Gligorov
SDSM
Elected President
Boris Trajkovski
VMRO-DPMNE

Presidential elections were held in Macedonia on 31 October 1999, with a second round on 14 November. Tito Petkovski of the Social Democratic Union won the first round. However, as he received less than 50% of the vote, the election went to a second round, which was won by Boris Trajkovski of VMRO-DPMNE, who won 53.2% of the vote.

== Results ==
Candidate	Party	First round		Second round	
Candidate	Party	Votes	%	Votes	%
Tito Petkovski	Social Democratic Union	343,606	33.05	513,614	46.84
Boris Trajkovski	VMRO-DPMNE	219,098	21.08	582,808	53.16
Vasil Tupurkovski	Democratic Alternative	163,206	15.70		
Muharem Nëxhipi	Democratic Party of Albanians	155,978	15.00		
Stojan Andov	Liberal Party	111,983	10.77		
Muhamed Halili	Party for Democratic Prosperity	45,731	4.40		
Total		1,039,602	100.00	1,096,422	100.00
Valid votes		1,039,602	98.95	1,096,422	98.54
Invalid/blank votes		11,013	1.05	16,281	1.46
Total votes		1,050,615	100.00	1,112,703	100.00
Registered voters/turnout		1,613,284	65.12	1,610,340	69.10
Source: Nohlen & Stöver
