= Vasil Tupurkovski =

Macedonian academic and politician

- Васил Тупурковски
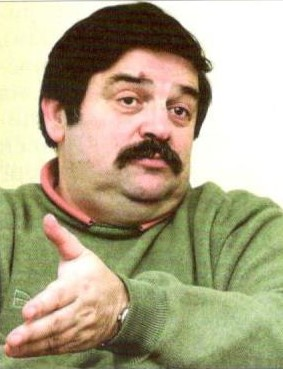

3rd Member of the Presidency of Yugoslavia for SR Macedonia
- In office 15 May 1989 – 8 September 1991
- Preceded by: Lazar Mojsov
- Succeeded by: Office abolished

Personal details
- Born: 8 April 1951 (age 74) Skopje, PR Macedonia, FPR Yugoslavia
- Party: Democratic Alternative (1998–present)
- Other political affiliations: SKJ (until 1990)

Vasil Tupurkovski (Macedonian: Васил Тупурковски; born 8 April 1951) is a Macedonian academic, politician and the former president of the Olympic Committee of North Macedonia.

== Life ==
Tupurkovski was born on 8 April 1951 in Skopje, PR Macedonia, FPR Yugoslavia. His father was a commander of the communist Democratic Army of Greece during the Greek Civil War from 1946 to 1949, who fled to Skopje after 1950. After his graduation in 1972 from the Faculty of Law at the University of Skopje, he worked as an assistant professor of International law at the university from 1974 to 1976, becoming an associate professor in 1976 and a full professor in 1983. He served as the president of the League of Socialist Youth of Yugoslavia from 1979 to 1980. He was also a member of the Presidium of the League of Communists of Yugoslavia from 1986 to 1989, and a member of the collective presidency of SFR Yugoslavia from 1989 to 1992. Until 1990, he supported the preservation of the Yugoslav federation. Tupurkovski was featured in the BBC documentary The Death of Yugoslavia. In 1992, he became the president of the Macedonian Olympic Committee. In 1995, Tupurkovski was a special envoy of Macedonian president Kiro Gligorov to the United States, where he spoke against his policy of equal distance with all of the country's neighbors.

He was the founder of the centrist political party Democratic Alternative (DA) in March 1998. During the 1998 election campaign, he pledged to bring one billion dollars in foreign investment, if elected. Tupurkovski negotiated a deal with Taiwan, but was accused by his political opponents of personally profiting from it, which he denied. After the victory in the 1998 elections and the entry of his party DA in a coalition with VMRO-DPMNE, Tupurkovski served as the director of the Agency for Reconstruction and Development from November 1998 to December 1999. He influenced VMRO-DPMNE to abandon its anti-Albanian sentiment and to focus on economic issues. Between 1999 and 2000, he served as Deputy Prime Minister in the government under Ljubčo Georgievski. Tupurkovski participated as a candidate in the 1999 presidential elections, but he did not have the support of VMRO-DPMNE and ended up losing to their candidate Boris Trajkovski. In July 2000, Tupurkovski became minister without portfolio in the government of national unity during the 2001 insurgency in Macedonia. In December 2000, he resigned from his position and withdrew the DA from the government, accusing Georgievski of failing to introduce reforms and violating the principles of democracy.

In April 2009, he was sentenced to three years in prison on the charge of embezzlement. Tupurkovski protested against the verdict. This decision was later reversed on 9 December 2009 by the Appellate Court. He was acquitted twice in retrials. Tupurkovski has been a member of the International Law Association.

== Views and works ==
In 1989, in a speech to the Yugoslav Federal Assembly, he criticized the expressions of extreme Macedonian nationalism, but argued that Yugoslav policy should be more coherent on the issue of Macedonian minority rights in Greece and Bulgaria. In the same year, he advocated for political pluralism.

Tupurkovski disputed the Greek interpretation of antiquity, claiming that the ancient Macedonians had a non-Greek identity and language. He authored the books History of Macedonia from earliest times until the death of Alexander the Great (1993) and History of Macedonia from the death of Alexander the Great to the Macedonian-Roman wars (1994).
