= Party for the Full Emancipation of the Roma of Macedonia =

Ethnic Roma political party in North Macedonia

Party for the Full Emancipation of the Roma of Macedonia Партија за целосна еманципација на Ромите од Македонија
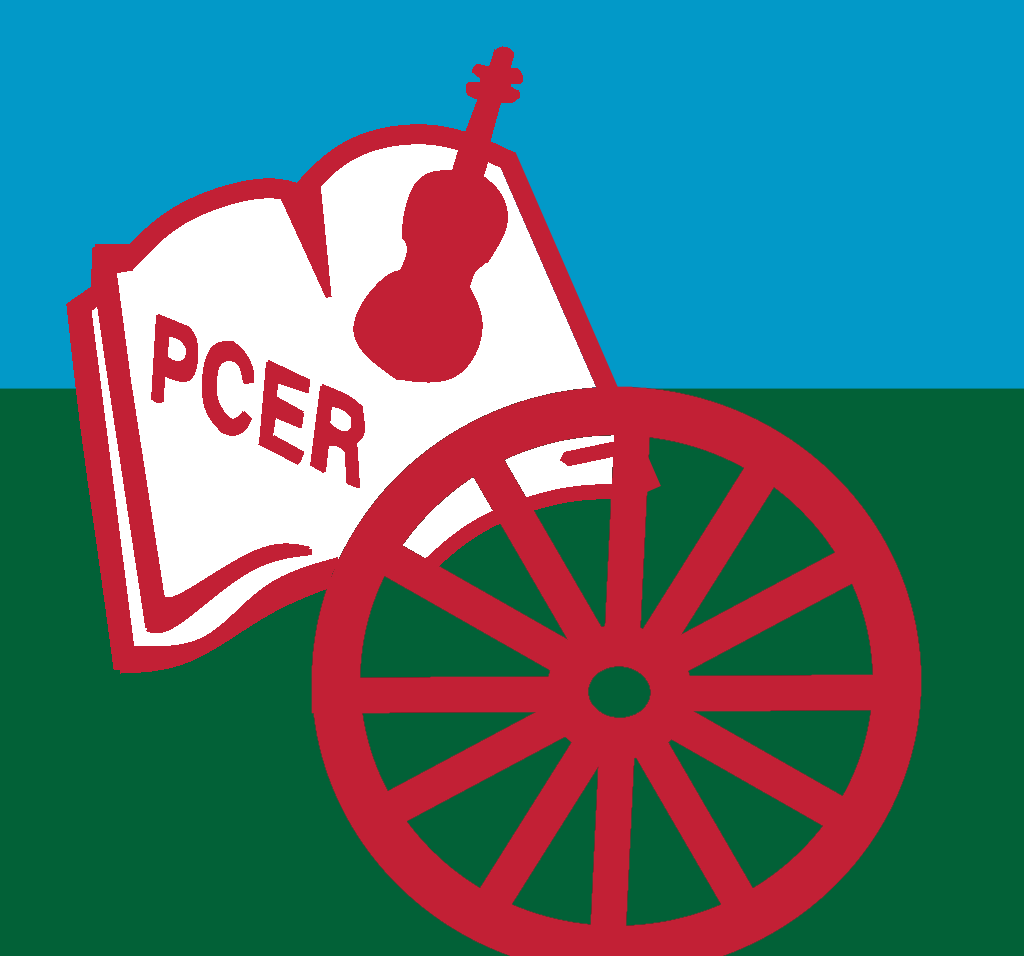
- Abbreviation: PCERM
- Leader: Samka Ibraimovski
- Founder: Faik Abdi
- Founded: 1990
- Ideology: Romani interests
- National affiliation: Experience for Success

The Party for the Full Emancipation of the Roma of Macedonia (Macedonian: Партија за целосна еманципација на Ромите од Македонија, Partija za Celosna Emancipacija na Romite od Makedonija, PCERM) is a political party in North Macedonia representing the Roma minority.

== History ==
Established in 1990 by Faik Abdi, the PCERM contested the 1990 parliamentary elections at a time when Macedonia was still part of Yugoslavia. It ran alone in some areas and in alliance with the Socialist Party in others, the latter alliance winning a single seat, taken by Abdi. It ran alone in the 1994 elections, receiving 0.7% of the vote and winning one seat. During the 1994–98 parliamentary term it was represented in the Assembly by Abdi and Amdi Bajram. Reportedly, in the 1990s, leaders of the PCERM called for the establishment of an independent Romani state, "Romanistan".

The 1998 elections saw the party run in an alliance with the Socialist Party, the Democratic Party of Turks, the Democratic Progressive Party of Roma in Macedonia and the Party of Democratic Action of Macedonia. Despite finishing sixth with 4.7% of the national vote, the alliance failed to win a single seat. The PCERM contested the 2002 elections alone, but received just 0.2% of the vote and remained seatless.

The party did not contest the 2006 elections. However, it returned to run in the 2008 elections as part of the For a Better Macedonia coalition led by VMRO-DPMNE. The alliance won the election, taking 63 of the 120 seats in the Assembly.

However, prior to the 2011 elections, the PCERM joined the Social Democratic Union (SDSM)-led alliance, State Election Commission</ref> which lost the election to the VMRO-DPMNE coalition. It remained part of the SDSM alliance for the 2014 elections, again losing to VMRO-DPMNE.

== See also ==
- List of political parties in North Macedonia
- Romani people in North Macedonia
