= List of ambassadors of North Macedonia to China =

Coordinates: 39.934170°N 116.458610°E

Ambassador of North Macedonia to the People's Republic of China
- Incumbent; Sashko Nasev since February 16, 2024
- Inaugural holder: Fatmir Dzeladini
- Formation: February 28, 2004

The North Macedonia ambassador in Beijing is the official representative of the government in Skopje to the government of the People's Republic of China.

== List of representatives ==
Diplomatic agrément/Diplomatic accreditation	Ambassador	Observations	Prime Minister of North Macedonia	Premier of the People's Republic of China	Term end
October 12, 1993		The governments in Beijing and Skopje practiced mutual recognition.	Branko Crvenkovski	Li Peng	
January 1, 1999		Ljubčo Georgievski won the election and immediately recognised the government in Taipei (Taiwan). The government in Beijing closed its embassy in Skopje and vetoed the UNPREDEP extension in the Security Council on 25 February 1999.	Ljubčo Georgievski	Zhu Rongji	
June 12, 2001		The governments in Beijing and Skopje restored their diplomatic relations.	Ljubčo Georgievski	Zhu Rongji	
February 28, 2004	Fatmir Dzeladini		Branko Crvenkovski	Wen Jiabao	December 28, 2005
March 3, 2010	Oliver Shambevski		Nikola Gruevski	Wen Jiabao	
July 8, 2014	Ilija Isajlovski		Nikola Gruevski	Li Keqiang	
2017	Zorica Tashkovska				2020
June 2020	Elizabeta Gjorgjieva				2024
February 16, 2024	Sashko Nasev	On December 12, 2024, President Xi Jinping received the credentials of 28 ambassadors to China at the Great Hall of the People in Beijing			Incumbent
