= List of mayors of Radoviš =

Coat of arms of Sofia

This is a chronological list of mayors of Radoviš in North Macedonia.

From	Until	Mayor (Macedonian: Градоначалник, Gradonačalnik)	notes
1996	2000	Kirčo Susinov	SDSM
2000	2005	Prof. Dr. Riste Kukutanov	VMRO-DPMNE
2005	2009	Dr. Robert Velkov, MD	VMRO-DPMNE
2009	2013	Dr. Robert Velkov, MD	VMRO-DPMNE
