= Party of Democratic Action–Islamic Path =

Defunct Macedonian political party

The Party of Democratic Action–Islamic Path was a political party in Macedonia.

== History ==
The party was created in 1991 as a pan-Islamist split from the Party of Democratic Action. It ran in the 1994 general elections both alone and in alliance with the Democratic Party of Turks. Although it failed to win a seat with its own list, the alliance won a single seat, taken by Kjenen Hasipi.

Following the 1994 elections, the party did not contest any further elections.
