= Gordan Georgiev =

Macedonian politician

Gordan Georgiev (Macedonian: Гордан Георгиев; born 8 November 1978) is a former Macedonian politician in the Assembly of North Macedonia for the Social Democratic Union of Macedonia. He was born in Skopje and educated at Sciences Po, Paris (Political Science) and King's College London (MA European Studies, 2004).
