= 2004 Macedonian presidential election =

- 14 April 2004 (first round); 28 April 2004 (second round)
- Turnout: 55.18% (first round); 53.64% (second round)
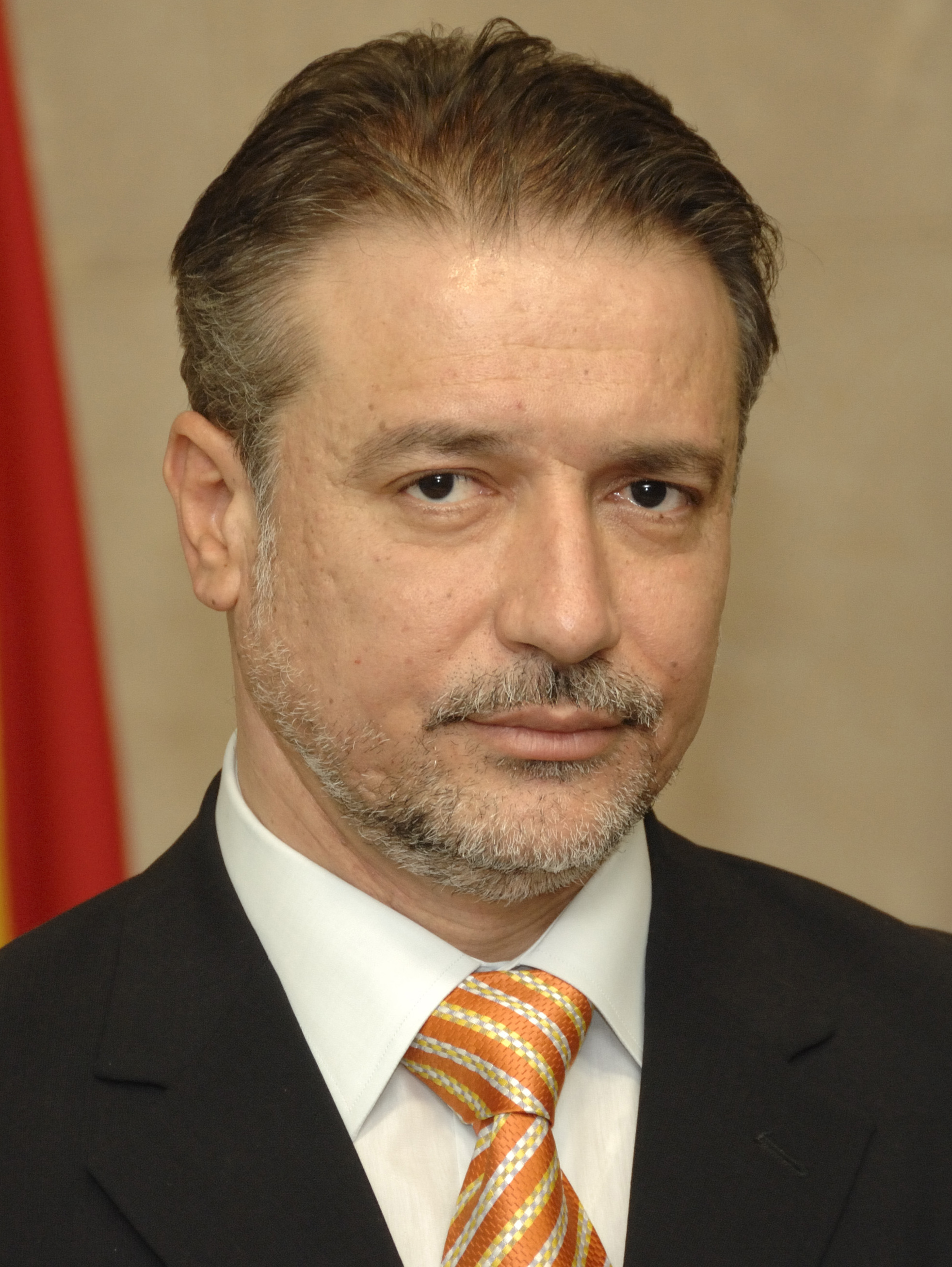

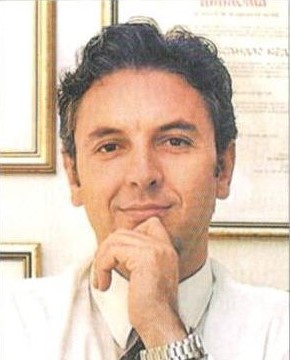
Nominee	Branko Crvenkovski	Saško Kedev
Party	SDSM	VMRO-DPMNE
Popular vote	550,317	329,179
Percentage	62.57%	37.43%
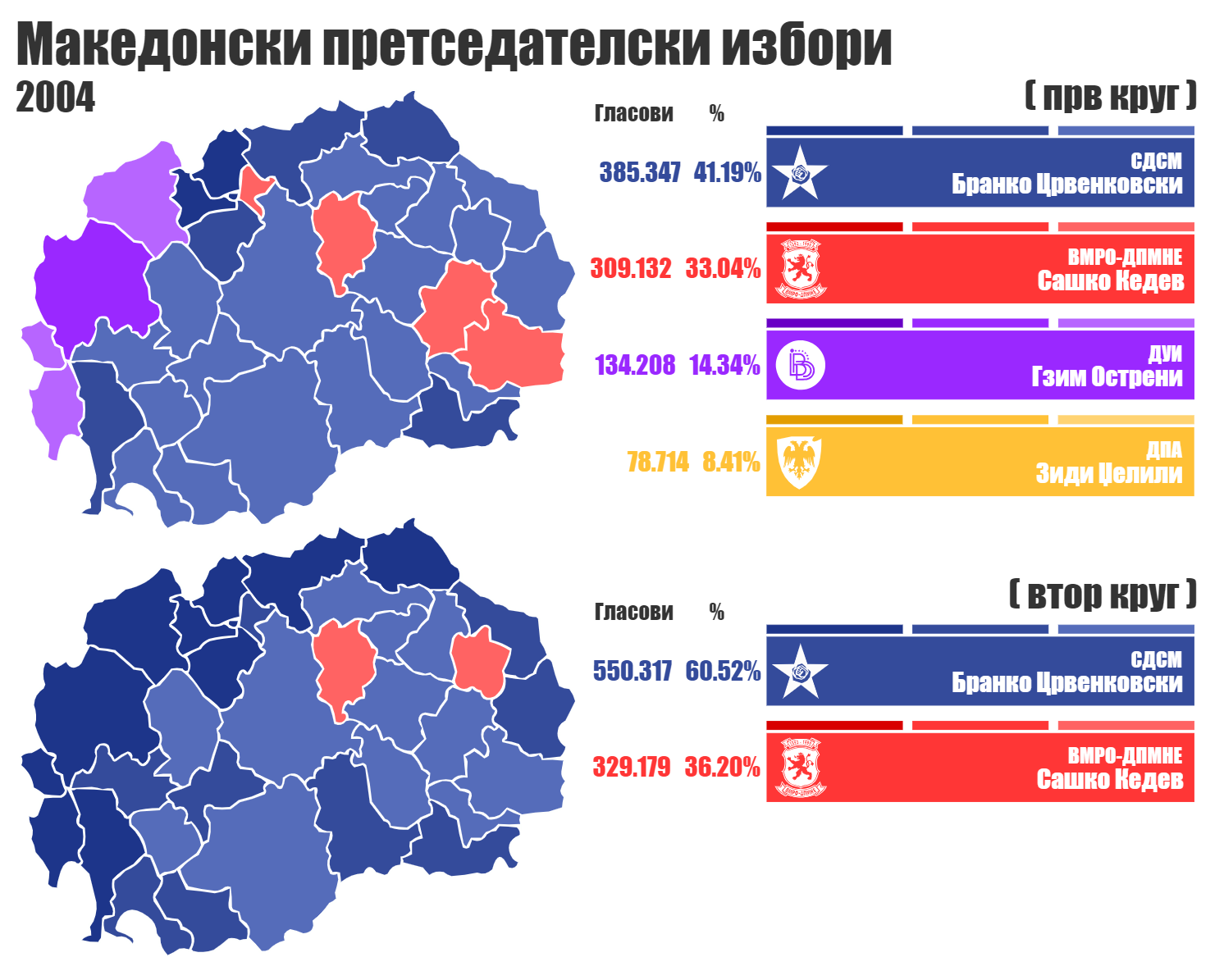
President before election
Ljupčo Jordanovski (acting)
SDSM
Elected President
Branko Crvenkovski
SDSM

Presidential elections were held in Macedonia on 14 April 2004, with a second round on 28 April. They followed the death in an air crash in February of incumbent President Boris Trajkovski.

Prime Minister Branko Crvenkovski of the Social Democratic Union won the first round. As he failed to cross the 50% threshold, a second round was held in which he defeated Saško Kedev of Internal Macedonian Revolutionary Organization – Democratic Party for Macedonian National Unity. In the immediate aftermath, Kedev alleged massive electoral fraud.

== Results ==
Candidate	Party	First round		Second round	
Candidate	Party	Votes	%	Votes	%
Branko Crvenkovski	Social Democratic Union	385,347	42.47	550,317	62.57
Saško Kedev	VMRO-DPMNE	309,132	34.07	329,179	37.43
Gëzim Ostreni	Democratic Union for Integration	134,208	14.79		
Zidi Xhelili	Democratic Party of Albanians	78,714	8.67		
Total		907,401	100.00	879,496	100.00
Valid votes		907,401	97.01	879,496	96.72
Invalid/blank votes		27,971	2.99	29,793	3.28
Total votes		935,372	100.00	909,289	100.00
Registered voters/turnout		1,695,103	55.18	1,695,103	53.64
Source: Nohlen & Stöver
