= 2004 presidential election =

2004 presidential election may refer to:

- 2004 Afghan presidential election
- 2004 Algerian presidential election
- 2004 Austrian presidential election
- 2004 Dominican Republic presidential election
- 2004 Georgia presidential election
- 2004 Icelandic presidential election
- 2004 Indonesian presidential election
- 2004 Irish presidential election
- 2004 Macedonian presidential election
- 2004 Panamanian election
- 2004 Philippine general election
- 2004 Taiwan (Republic of China) presidential election
- 2004 Russian presidential election
- 2004 Salvadoran presidential election
- 2004 Serbian presidential elections
- 2004 Ukrainian presidential election
- 2004 United States presidential election
