= Dragan Bogdanovski =

Macedonian activist (1929–1998)

Dragan Bogdanovski (Macedonian: Драган Богдановски. 18 September 1929 – 31 May 1998) was a Macedonian émigré, activist and founder of VMRO-DPMNE.

== Life ==
Dragan Bogdanovski was born on 18 September 1929 in Klečevce, Kumamovo region, Kingdom of Yugoslavia. He graduated from a secondary agricultural school and studied at the Faculty of Agriculture in Zemun, where he was sentenced to four-month imprisonment in Belgrade in 1949 for nationalist activities. He spent years in emigration, in Latin America and Europe. Bogdanovski went to Paris and studied political science. He formed the Macedonian student group People’s Front (Macedonian: Народен Фронт) and published the newspaper Macedonian Spark (Macedonian: Македонска Искра). Bogdanovski also published Macedonian Nation (Macedonian: Македонска Нација), an emigrant newspaper in the Macedonian language. He founded the Movement for the Liberation and Unification of Macedonia, receiving support from nationalist émigrés and gastarbeiters in Europe. According to Bulgarian researcher Dimitar Bechev, while in Paris, he was kidnapped by Yugoslav security services in 1977. In 1979, he was sentenced to 13 years in prison by the Skopje district court for leading an organization which called for the establishment of an independent Macedonian state (including also Macedonian parts of Greece and Bulgaria). Amnesty International adopted him as a prisoner of conscience. After his release in 1988, he went on to co-find the political party Internal Macedonian Revolutionary Organization - Democratic Party for Macedonian National Unity (VMRO-DPMNE). At the party's first congress in 1991, Bogdanovski was elected as its honorary chairman. However, due to co-founder Ljubčo Georgievski's pro-Bulgarian stance, he split from the party in 1993 and established the Macedonian National Front. He died on 31 May 1998. Bogdanovski was buried in Kumanovo.

== Legacy ==
A figure of him was placed in the Museum of the Macedonian Struggle in Skopje during the rule of Macedonian prime minister Nikola Gruevski. Two volumes of books about him from his legacy were published in 2015. A bust of him was placed next to the headquarters of VMRO-DPMNE in June 2023.

Georgievski accused him of being a Yugoslav secret agent. A representative of Bogdanovski's family criticized the claims Georgievski made about Bogdanovski in his book My Macedonian story - where are you going Macedonia. Macedonian politician Stojan Andov claimed that Bogdanovski was against the acronym "VMRO" for the name of VMRO-DPMNE. Georgievski sharply criticized him for the claim. A Macedonian political dissident in Canada, in response to the article by Andov, claimed that Bogdanovski was a collaborator of UDBA. Bulgarian academic Spas Tashev claimed that he was an agent of UDBA, for which he was criticized by Macedonian academics.
