= List of international presidential trips made by Branko Crvenkovski =

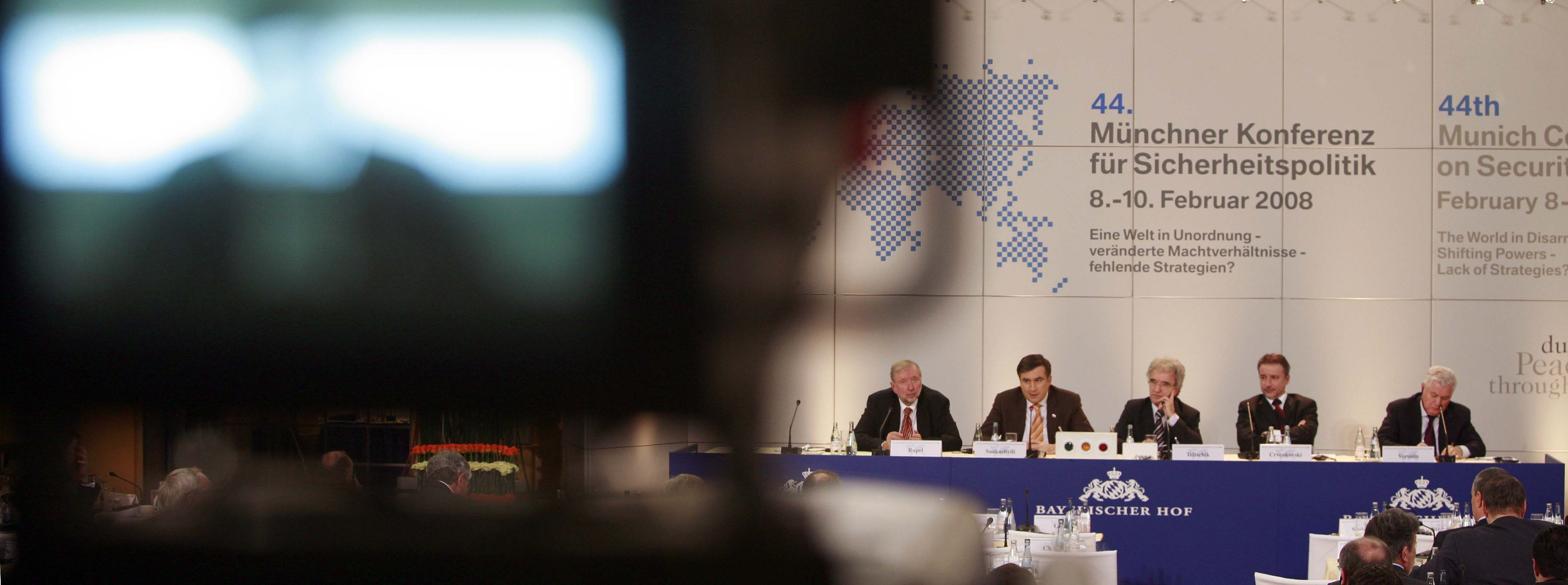
Branko Crvenkovski (second from right) during the Munich Security Conference 2008

The following is a list of state visits made by Branko Crvenkovski during his tenure as president of Macedonia from 2004 to 2009.

Date	Country	Cities visited	Note
July 7–8, 2005	Moldova	Chișinău	Official State Visit
October 15–16, 2006	Serbia	Belgrade	Official State Visit
June 18–20, 2007	Germany	Berlin	Official State Visit
March 11–12, 2008	Slovakia	Bratislava	Official State Visit
May 10–11, 2007	Poland	Warsaw	Official State Visit
March 18, 2008	Slovenia	Ljubljana	Official State Visit
July 17, 2008	Albania	Tirana	Official State Visit
November 6–07, 2008	Croatia	Zagreb	Official State Visit
December 11–12, 2008	Hungary	Budapest	Official State Visit
February 10–11, 2009	Bulgaria	Sofia, Plovdiv	Official State Visit
March 3–4, 2009	Bosnia and Herzegovina	Sarajevo	Official State Visit
