= New Social Democratic Party =

Social-democratic political party in North Macedonia

New Social Democratic Party Нова социјалдемократска партија
- Abbreviation: NSDP
- Leader: Goran Misovski
- Founder: Tito Petkovski
- Founded: 30 November 2005
- Split from: SDSM
- Headquarters: Skopje
- Ideology: Social democracy Pro-Europeanism
- Political position: Centre-left
- National affiliation: For a European Future
- Colours: Blue, Yellow
- Parliament: 2 / 120
- Mayors: 0 / 81

Website
- www.nsdp.org.mk

The New Social Democratic Party (NSDP; Macedonian: Нова социјалдемократска партија, romanized: Nova socijaldemokratska partija) is a centre-left, social democratic political party in North Macedonia. Its leader is Goran Misovski. In the 2006 parliamentary elections, it received 6% of the vote. In the 2016 parliamentary elections, it participated in an electoral coalition with SDSM and 15 other parties. The coalition won 436,981 votes and 49/120 MPs in Macedonian assembly. The party also participated in the 2024 parliamentary elections within the electoral coalition of SDSM.
