= Democratic Party of Macedonia =

The Democratic Party (Macedonian: Демократска партија на Македонија, Demokratska Partija na Makedonija, DPM) was a political party in Macedonia.

== History ==
The party first contested national elections in 1994, when it ran in the parliamentary elections that year. It received 1.5% of the vote in the first round and 1% in the second. It won a single seat, taken by Tomislav Stojanovski. The 1998 elections saw it run in an alliance with the Liberal Democratic Party (LDP). The alliance won four seats, all of which were taken by the LDP.

The DPM contested the 2002 elections alone, but received just 0.2% of the vote and remained seatless. It did not contest any further national elections.
