= Democratic Party (Macedonia) =

Political party in Macedonia

The Democratic Party (Macedonian: Демократска партија, Demokratska Partija, DP) was a political party in Macedonia.

== History ==
The establishment of the party was announced by Petar Gošev in April 1993 after he left the Social Democratic Union, which he had previously headed. Gošev was joined by several former members of the League of Democracy, which was dissolved in May, as well as three other minor parties; Ilinden–Free Democrats, the Green Party and the Reform Party of Ohrid. A founding assembly was held on 27 June, and the party had three MPs going into the 1994 elections; Gošev, Mihail Panovski and Risto Jovanov.

The elections saw the party run on a platform of lower taxes and a privatisation voucher scheme. It finished in third place with 11% of the vote in the first round of voting, but boycotted the second round due to electoral irregularities, and as a result, failed to win a seat. Despite its protestations, the DP was accused of violating a ban on campaigning in the 48 hours prior to election day by putting up posters in Kumanovo, and was subsequently fined 25,000 denars.

In April 1997 the party merged with the Liberal Party to form the Liberal Democratic Party, with Gošev becoming its first leader.

Despite the merger, a faction of the DP ran in the 1998 elections as part of an alliance with the MAAK – Conservative Party and the Macedonian Alliance. However, the alliance received less than 1% of the vote in both rounds and failed to win a seat. The DP did not contest any further elections.
