= Boris Trajkovski =

President of Macedonia from 1999 to 2004

Boris Trajkovski GCMG
- Борис Трајковски
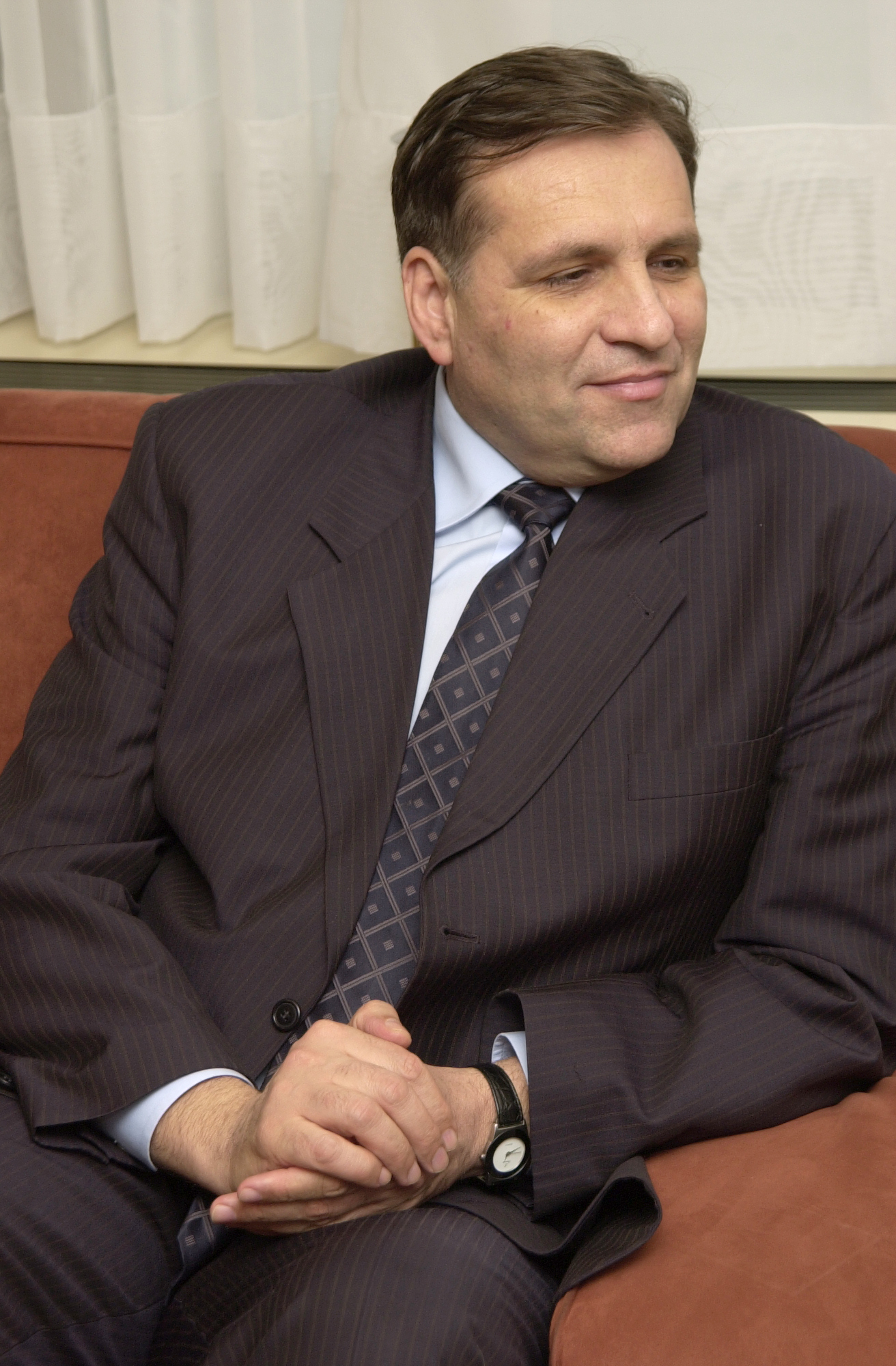
- Trajkovski in 2002

President of Macedonia
- In office 15 December 1999 – 26 February 2004
- Prime Minister: Ljubčo Georgievski; Branko Crvenkovski
- Preceded by: Kiro Gligorov
- Succeeded by: Branko Crvenkovski

Personal details
- Born: 25 June 1956 Murtino, PR Macedonia, FPR Yugoslavia
- Died: 26 February 2004 (aged 47) Berkovići, Bosnia and Herzegovina
- Citizenship: Macedonian
- Party: VMRO-DPMNE
- Spouse: Vilma Trajkovska (m. 1985; 2004; his death)
- Education: Ss. Cyril and Methodius University in Skopje

Boris Trajkovski (GCMG; Macedonian: Борис Трајковски, pronounced ['bɔris 'trajkɔfski]; 25 June 1956 – 26 February 2004) was a Macedonian politician who served as the president of Macedonia from 1999 until his death in 2004 in a plane crash.

== Early life ==
Trajkovski was born on 25 June 1956 in the village of Murtino in the region of Strumica in PR Macedonia, FPR Yugoslavia (modern North Macedonia), into a Methodist family. He studied at a gymnasium in Strumica. As a Methodist Christian, he led the Yugoslav Methodist youth organization for 12 years. Trajkovski graduated in 1980 with a degree in law from the Ss. Cyril and Methodius University in Skopje. He also studied at a Protestant theological college in the United States. Trajkovski subsequently specialised in commercial and employment law, later serving as the leader of the legal department of the Sloboda construction company in Skopje until 1997. The communist government had also confined him to the countryside during the Cold War, where he served as a lay pastor of a Romani congregation.

== Career in politics ==
After the Republic of Macedonia's independence, he became a member of the political party VMRO-DPMNE in 1992. He led its foreign relations commission for six years, as well as serving as the Chief of Staff of the Mayor of Kisela Voda from 1997 to 1998. Trajkovski became the deputy foreign minister following VMRO-DPMNE's victory in the 1998 elections. He supported NATO's deployment in the country before and during the Kosovo War, for which he was subject to criticism by the left-wing opposition. As a moderate member of the party, Trajkovski was selected as VMRO-DPMNE's candidate for president in the 1999 election held to replace the outgoing president, Kiro Gligorov. The leaders of the Democratic Party of Albanians, which was in a coalition with VMRO-DPMNE, encouraged their supporters to vote for Trajkovski. In the presidential election, there were irregularities, so there was a partial re-run in December and Trajkovski managed to win 96 per cent of the vote. OSCE's observers expressed "serious concerns" about the result, while domestic opposition politicians accused Trajkovski of unfairly mobilising groups of ethnic Albanians to vote multiple times and intimidate opposition supporters. The Albanian vote was crucial for his victory, although inflated and suffering from irregularities, due to Albanians being alienated by Tito Petkovski's anti-Albanian platform. On 15 December 1999, Trajkovski was inaugurated as president of the Republic of Macedonia.

Trajkovski's tenure was marked by tensions between ethnic Macedonians and the republic's large ethnic Albanian minority. The aftermath of the Kosovo War led to months of conflict in 2001 between Macedonian security forces and ethnic Albanian rebels. During the conflict, protests occurred due to the Macedonian assault on Aračinovo being halted, the evacuation of around 500 Nаtional Liberation Army insurgents, and the involvement of the international community. Protesters broke into the parliament building and demanded to talk to him, shouting "treason" and "resignation." Although his powers were limited and his role largely ceremonial, he presided over the NATO-brokered Ohrid Framework Agreement (OFA) in 2001 that ended the violence and prevented a full-blown civil war in the Republic of Macedonia. He was also a signatory of OFA. Trajkovski was credited with improving the country's intra-ethnic relations. He supported OFA and Macedonia's integration into NATO and the European Union (EU). During his tenure, the country also rose to a score of nine out of ten in the Polity IV democracy index since 2002, while also achieving the status of an electoral democracy in the same year, per a V-Dem democracy index.

In 2002, he was made an honorary Knight Grand Cross of the Order of St Michael and St George by Queen Elizabeth II. In the same year, Trajkovski was awarded the World Methodist Peace Award by the World Methodist Council for his role in promoting peace and political stability. In his last act as president, he signed Macedonia's application for EU membership.

== Death ==
Trajkovski plane crash
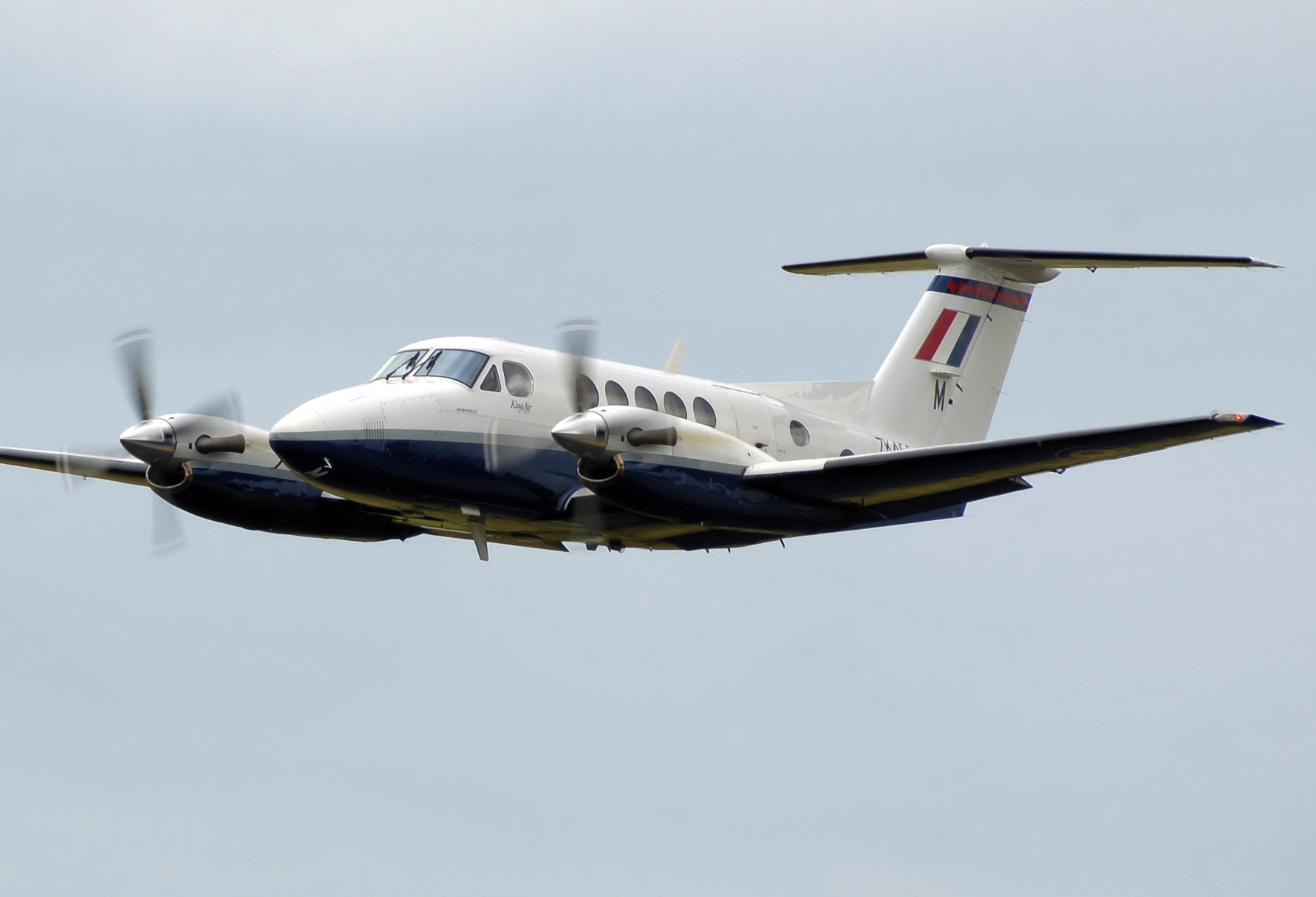
- Beechcraft Super King Air 200 similar to accident aircraft

Accident
- Date: 26 February 2004
- Summary: Controlled flight into terrain likely caused by inclement weather
- Site: Poplat, Berkovići, Bosnia and Herzegovina

Aircraft
- Aircraft type: Beechcraft Super King Air 200
- Operator: Republic of Macedonia
- Registration: Z3-BAB
- Passengers: 7
- Crew: 2
- Fatalities: 9
- Survivors: 0

Trajkovski died on 26 February 2004 in a plane crash en route to an economic conference in Mostar, Bosnia and Herzegovina. On the same day, he had also sent a delegation to Ireland to submit Macedonia's application for EU membership. The aircraft crashed in thick fog and heavy rain on a mountainside in southeastern Herzegovina, near the villages of Poplat and Vrsnik eight miles (13 km) south-south-east of Mostar. He is the only Macedonian president to die in office. Eight other people were also aboard but none survived the impact.

His fate was unknown for two days because Bosnian rescue teams and NATO peacekeepers struggled to breach through uncleared minefields to reach the area where his aircraft crashed. The path to the wreckage was cleared by explosive experts. All of the corpses of the deceased, including Trajkovski, were found and sent to a morgue. His body was transferred from Sarajevo to Skopje on 3 March.

After his death, there was a state funeral in the Alley of the Great at the Butel cemetery in Skopje on 5 March in his honour. International leaders and officials, including presidents and prime ministers from around 50 countries, as well as 200,000 Macedonians, attended the funeral, while tributes were paid by UN Secretary-General Kofi Annan and Pope John Paul II. On his gravestone in Strumica is the verse Matthew 5:9 from the Bible which states: "Blessed are the peacemakers for they shall be called the sons of God." Flags were lowered at half-staff and Macedonia held three days of mourning. Branko Crvenkovski from SDSM succeeded him as president. Trajkovski was married, having a son and a daughter. A foundation bearing his name was created after his death, which was founded by his wife, Vilma Trajkovska.

Despite the confirmation by a joint Bosnian-Macedonian team that the cause of his death was an accident, mostly due to mistakes by the flight crew, speculations arose about the cause of his death. Macedonian authorities initiated a new investigation in 2013. A regional investigation conducted in December 2014 by people from Bosnia and Herzegovina, Croatia, Macedonia and Serbia re-confirmed that the cause of death was an accident, attributed to pilot errors, technical problems and procedural mistakes. The chief investigator said the aircraft had non-functioning low-altitude alarm, black box and location beacon. The autopilot function also had been turned off, which might have saved the aircraft. The flight crew did not have proper training, failing to check the weather forecast before takeoff, while the co-pilot ignored warnings from air traffic control to head for another airport due to the bad weather over Mostar and decreased altitude instead.

== Awards and recognitions ==
- Order of Merit of the Republic of Hungary-Grand Cross with chain
- Grand Cross of the Order of Merit of the Republic of Poland
- (United Kingdom) Honorary Knight Grand Cross of the Order of St. Michael and St. George
- World Methodist Council - Peace Award for 2002

Preceded by Kiro Gligorov	President of North Macedonia; 1999–2004	Succeeded by Branko Crvenkovski
