= Vice President of Macedonia =

Defunct office in Macedonia

The vice president of Macedonia was a political position in the Republic of Macedonia in 1991 before a new constitution was adopted in November 1991. The Vice President was elected alongside the President of Macedonia by the Assembly of the Republic of Macedonia in January 1991.

No.	Image	Name	Took office	Left office	Notes
1		Ljubčo Georgievski	27 January 1991	October 1991	Resigned
