= Democratic League of Bosniaks =

Political party in North Macedonia

The Democratic League of Bosniaks (Bosnian: Demokratski Savez Bošnjaka, Macedonian: Демократска лига на Бошњаците, Demokratska Liga na Bošnjacite) is a political party in North Macedonia, representative of the ethnic Bosniaks living in North Macedonia.

At the legislative elections on 15 September 2002, the party won 1 out of 120 seats as part of the Together for Macedonia alliance, led by the Social Democratic Union of Macedonia and the Liberal Democratic Party. Uncontended with the positions at the PR lists of Together for Macedonia alliance for the 2006 parliamentary election, the DLB has left this coalition and entered the coalition between ethnic Albanian parties Democratic Union for Integration and Party for Democratic Prosperity.
