= Ljubčo Georgievski =

Macedonian politician (born 1966)

- Љубчо Георгиевски
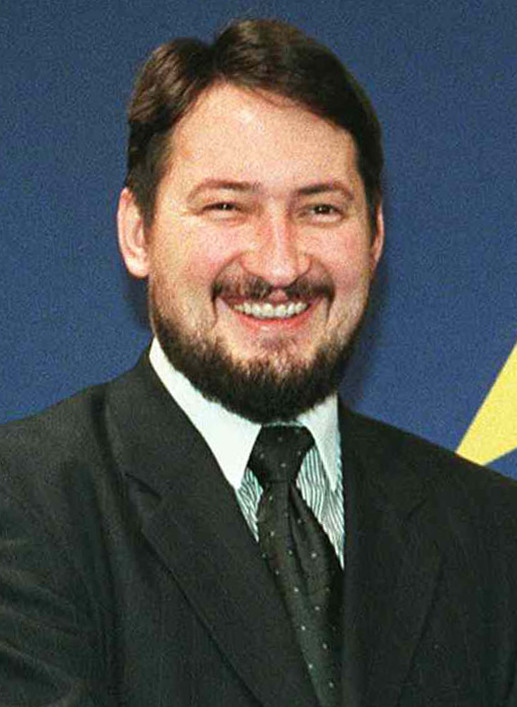
- Georgievski in 1999

Prime Minister of Macedonia
- In office 30 November 1998 – 1 November 2002
- President: Kiro Gligorov; Boris Trajkovski
- Preceded by: Branko Crvenkovski
- Succeeded by: Branko Crvenkovski

Vice President of Macedonia
- In office 27 January 1991 – October 1991
- President: Kiro Gligorov
- Preceded by: Office established
- Succeeded by: Office abolished

President of VMRO-DPMNE
- In office 17 June 1990 – 25 May 2003
- Preceded by: Office established
- Succeeded by: Nikola Gruevski

Personal details
- Born: 17 January 1966 (age 60) Štip, SR Macedonia, SFR Yugoslavia
- Citizenship: North Macedonia; Bulgaria
- Party: MAAK (1990); VMRO-DPMNE (1990–2004); VMRO-NP (2004–present)
- Children: 1
- Education: Ss. Cyril and Methodius University in Skopje
- Profession: Writer

Ljubčo (Note: Georgievski wrote in his 2001 book Realization of the Immortal Dream (Остварување на вековниот сон; ISBN 9989-610-06-1) that the reason why his name is spelled Ljubčo and not Ljupčo (Љупчо), in breach of regular Macedonian spelling rules, is because it should follow Bulgarian spelling. From 1996 he stopped writing his first name with p, but with b, according to the Bulgarian etymological spelling.) Georgievski (Macedonian: Љубчо Георгиевски, pronounced [ˈʎupt͡ʃɔ ɟɛɔrɟiˈɛfski]; Bulgarian: Любчо Георгиевски, romanized: Lyubcho Georgievski; born 17 January 1966) is a Macedonian politician and writer who served as the only Vice President of Macedonia from January to October 1991 and as the Prime Minister of Macedonia from 1998 to 2002. He advocated for the country's independence.

Georgievski was one of the founders of the Internal Macedonian Revolutionary Organization - Democratic Party for Macedonian National Unity (VMRO-DPMNE) and was the first party president from 1990 to 2003. However, he split from the party and established VMRO-NP in 2004. He acquired Bulgarian citizenship in 2006.

== Life ==
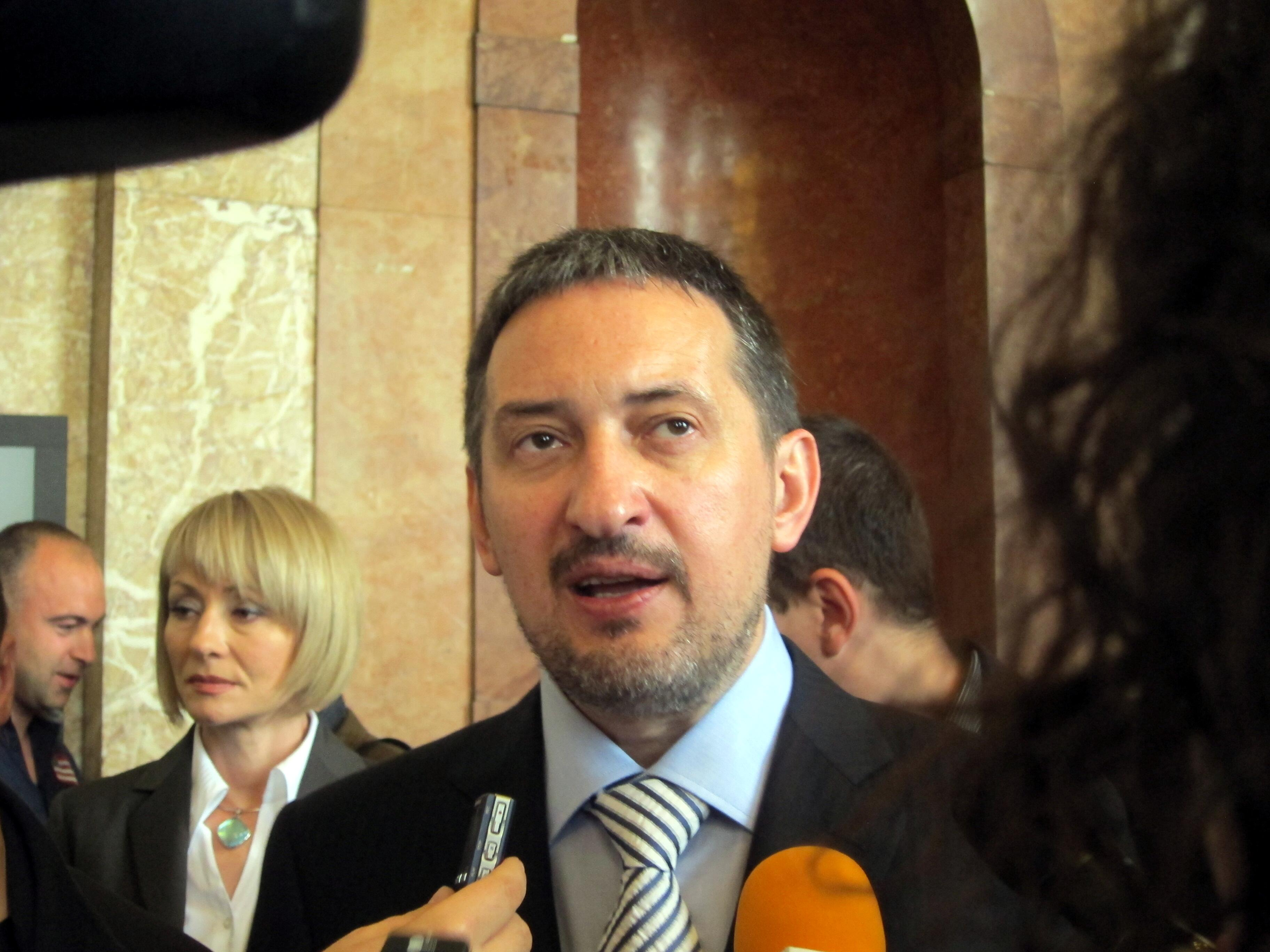
Georgievski in 2012

Ljubčo Georgievski was born on 17 January 1966 in Štip, SR Macedonia, SFR Yugoslavia, where he had primary and secondary education. In 1988, Georgievski graduated from the Faculty of Philology of the Ss. Cyril and Methodius University of Skopje, specializing in comparative literature. In his twenties, he promoted anti-communism and advocated for Macedonian independence. He was a member of Movement for All-Macedonian Action (MAAK) and he said in the 2012 TV documentary "Twenty years of independence" (Macedonian: 20 години независност) that he participated in the founding meeting of the party where he stated that MAAK has to be a movement for a confederation. In the circles of the party he met with Boris Zmejkovski and Dragan Bogdanovski. After he left the party he intended to create a new political movement.

Georgievski, Bogdanovski, Zmejkovski, and a few other activists agreed to make a party for independent Macedonia. The Internal Macedonian Revolutionary Organization – Democratic Party for Macedonian National Unity was founded on 17 June 1990 in SR Macedonia. Georgievski was elected as the party's first president in the constituent assembly. In the first multi-party elections in 1990 Georgievski with his party had won the biggest number of seats in the Macedonian Assembly. Refusing to make a coalition with the ethnic Albanian parties Georgievski had failed to make a government and a non-partisan government came to power. After a new constitution was adopted in November 1990 he was elected as Vice President by the Assembly of the Republic of Macedonia on 27 January 1991. Georgievski resigned from the position in October 1991. He was a member of parliament from 1992 to 1994.

In 1998 Georgievski won the parliamentary elections and became Prime Minister of Macedonia with a coalition government with the Democratic Alternative party and the Democratic Party of Albanians. He contributed to the improvement of Macedonia–Bulgaria relations. On 22 February 1999, he signed an agreement with Bulgarian prime minister Ivan Kostov to normalize relations. During this period, he was accused by the opposition of implementing pro-Bulgarian policies. In the 1990s, Macedonian historians, such as Ivan Katardžiev and Krste Bitovski, also accused him and his party of pro-Bulgarian sentiments due to the party's opposition to the pro-Yugoslav interpretation of Macedonian history. He led the republic during the Macedonian insurgency in 2001, as well as a government of national unity (which was formed under international mediation). Georgievski supported a military solution for the conflict. He was among the people who signed the Ohrid Agreement on 13 August, which ended the conflict. In the same year, in Luxembourg, Georgievski signed the EU-backed Stabilization and Association Agreement. The International Crisis Group published two reports called Finance Peace in Macedonia, Not Corruption and Macedonia's Public Secret: How Corruption Drags the Country Down in September 2002 regarding corruption during his rule, before the elections. Georgievski resigned from the party's leadership on 24 May 2003 after he lost the 2002 elections and was succeeded the next day by the former finance minister in his government, Nikola Gruevski. In 2004, he left the party and was followed by his supporters, establishing the Internal Macedonian Revolutionary Organization – People's Party (VMRO-NP) on 4 July. He initially was the honorary chairman of VMRO-NP before becoming its president on 26 February 2012. In 2006 Georgievski acquired Bulgarian citizenship, declaring Bulgarian descent.

== Literary works ==
He is the author of a poetry collection Apocalypse (Macedonian: Апокалипса), verse novel City (Macedonian: Град) and a collection of short stories Direct Interventions with Short Stories into the Anatomic Structure of History (Macedonian: Директни интервенции со кратки раскази во анатомската структура на историјата). In 2007, Georgievski published his book Facing the Truth (Bulgarian: С лице към истината) in Bulgaria. In the book, he urges Macedonians to accept their Bulgarian heritage.

In 2012, Georgievski published his autobiographical book It is me (Macedonian: Тоа сум јас). There he revealed a range of new things about the unknown history of the country, including the fact that he together with his Serbian counterpart Zoran Đinđić, discussed the exchange of territories between Macedonia, Albania and Kosovo. The book confirms that in 1999 he was summoned to the White House, where former U.S. Secretary of State Madeleine Albright, sought permission from Macedonia ground forces of NATO to attack Serbia from the territory of the country. Among other things, he wrote that he had spent fifteen minutes talking to former Serbian and Yugoslav President Slobodan Milošević while he was visiting former Macedonian Interior Minister Ljube Boškoski in the Scheveningen prison. Regarding the state-political situation of the country, Georgievski concluded that "the Macedonians are the biggest counterfeiters of the Balkan history".

== Personal life and views ==
Georgievski is married and has a son.

According to him in 2012, the present development of the VMRO-DPMNE was his personal failure and he claimed that it was a fake party without any ideology. In North Macedonia, Georgievski has a reputation as a Bulgarophile but has also self-identified as one. It is a stigma in the country. On 27 February 2021, he made a five-point proposal on Facebook to improve North Macedonia–Bulgaria relations, which was criticized by VMRO-DPMNE and Pavle Trajanov from the party Democratic Alliance. He opined that Bulgarian and Macedonian people have a common history, but the process of separation of the Macedonians cannot be limited to 1944. It lasted at least 130-140 years, starting with linguistic separatism, followed by a political one and finally ended with national separation. In a TV show in 2021, he stated that he could not identify as anything other than as a Macedonian. He claimed that except Macedonian and Bulgarian, he also has a third citizenship but did not reveal it. Per him, the Macedonian state is the subject of heavy Serbianization.

| Preceded by Branko Crvenkovski | Prime Minister of the Republic of Macedonia; 1998–2002 | Succeeded by Branko Crvenkovski |
