= Democratic Centre (North Macedonia) =

Democratic Centre Демократски Центар
- Founded: 2002
- Ideology: Centrism

Democratic Centre (mk: Демократски Центар) is a centre-left political party in North Macedonia founded in 2002 by ex-members of the Democratic Alternative and several political debitants: Radomir Karangelovski, Savo Klimovski, Stole Popov, Tanja Karakamiseva, Arben Golja and Lazar Lazarov.

The party functions on a basis of rotating presidency. Its major political debut were the 2002 parliamentary elections in the Republic of Macedonia, when it failed to gain a seat.
