= Social Democratic Party of Macedonia =

Social Democratic Party of Macedonia Социјалдемократска партија на Македонија
- Abbreviation: SDPM
- Founder: Slavko Milosavlevski
- Founded: 1990

The Social Democratic Party of Macedonia (Macedonian: Социјалдемократска партија на Македонија, Socijal-demokratska partija na Makedonija, SDPM) is a political party in North Macedonia.

== History ==
Established in 1990, the SDPM was the first political party to register in Macedonia, with Slavko Milosavlevski becoming its founding president. It contested the 1990 parliamentary elections, at a time when Macedonia was still part of Yugoslavia. It received 1.6% of the vote in the first round and 0.2 in the second, failing to win a seat. It also ran in alliance with the Union of Reform Forces in some areas, but the alliance failed to win a seat.

Despite seeing its vote share fall to 1.2% in the first round of the 1994 elections, the party managed to win a single seat in the Assembly.

The SDPM did not contest the 1998 elections, but returned to run in the 2002 elections. However, the party received just 0.3% of the vote and failed to win a seat. The 2006 elections saw the party increase its vote share to 0.9%, but it remained seatless. In the 2008 elections its vote share fell to 0.65%, as the party again failed to win a seat. In the 2011 elections the party's vote share fell to just 0.2%. The 2014 elections saw it receive 0.4% of the vote, remaining seatless.
