= National Democratic Party (North Macedonia) =

The National Democratic Party (Macedonian: Национална демократска партија; Nacionalna Demokratska Partija) is a political party of ethnic Albanians in North Macedonia.

In the parliamentary elections on 15 September 2002, the party won 1 out of 120 seats. The party's only MP was the party's vice president Xhezair Shaqiri, AKA "Commander Hoxha" of the former "National Liberation Army" (NLA). Basri Haliti is the current party president, after most of the party leadership, including the then president Kastriot Haxhirexha, joined the Democratic Union for Integration (DUI) in 2003.
