= Party of Pensioners (North Macedonia) =

Pensioners' interests political party in North Macedonia

Party of Pensioners Партија на пензионери
- Leader: Ilija Nikolovski
- Vice Presidents: Mile Andonovski; Dobre Efremovski
- Founded: March 12, 2013
- Ideology: Pensioners' interests Pro-Europeanism; Atlanticism; Agrarianism
- Political position: Centre
- National affiliation: For a European Future
- Colours: Red and purple
- Slogan: Wisdom, Youth and Unity
- Assembly: 0 / 120
- Mayors: 0 / 81
- Local councils: 0 / 1,333
- Skopje City Council: 0 / 45

Website
- https://ppenzioneri.mk/

The Party of Pensioners (Macedonian: Партија на пензионери, Partiјa na penzioneri) is a political party in North Macedonia. In the 2020 elections, the party won one seat as part of the SDSM-led coalition.

== History ==
The party was founded on 12 March 2013 as Party of United Pensioners and Citizens of Macedonia (Macedonian: Партија на обединети пензионери и граѓани на Македонија – ПОПГМ, Partiјa na obedineti penzioneri i gragjani na Makedoniјa – POPGM), with Boris Stojanoski as the chair and 250 others present. It was founded after comments made by then-Finance Minister Zoran Stavreski surrounding pensions, which the party claimed meant that "pensions in the Republic of Macedonia would be the lowest in the region compared to the average paid salary in the country". For the 2016 election, the party formed an electoral alliance with the SDSM and 3 other parties. However, it failed to win any seats. In 2018, the party changed its name to Party of Pensioners (Macedonian: Партија на пензионери, Partiјa na penzioneri). In the We Can coalition in 2020, led again by the SDSM, the party's leader, Ilija Nikolovski, was elected.

== Ideology ==
The main concern for the party is the rights of pensioners. The party's election programme calls for "amendments to the Law on Pension Disability Insurance" and calls pensions a "legal, inalienable and permanent personal right". It states that "NATO and EU membership is the best long-term framework for guaranteeing the preservation of national interests". The programme also proposes a self-sufficient nation with regards to food, and an increased role of agriculture in the Macedonian economy.

In its 2016 election manifesto, POPGM called for a number of electoral reforms, such as the reduction of MPs in the Assembly of North Macedonia from 123 to 90 and limiting the Prime Minister to 2 terms. In addition, it called for the complete secularisation of the government, judicial reform, and reducing emigration from North Macedonia.
