= Liberal Party of Macedonia =

Conservative-liberal political party in North Macedonia

Liberal Party of Macedonia Либерална партија на Македонија
- Founded: 5 October 1990; 1999 (reformed)
- Dissolved: 2019
- Headquarters: Skopje
- Ideology: Conservative liberalism
- Political position: Centre to centre-right
- Regional affiliation: Liberal South East European Network
- European affiliation: Alliance of Liberals and Democrats for Europe
- Colours: Blue

Website
- www.lp.org.mk

The Liberal Party of Macedonia (Macedonian: Либерална партија на Македонија, romanized: Liberalna partija na Makedonija) was a conservative-liberal political party in North Macedonia. The party was a member of the Alliance of Liberals and Democrats for Europe Party. Its last chairman was Ivon Velichkovski.

== History ==
The Liberal Party was established on 5 October 1990 as the Union of Reform Forces in Macedonia (Сојуз на реформски сили, Sojuz na reformski sili, SRS) under the chairmanship of Stojan Andov. Although it shared its name with the Union of Reform Forces operating in other parts of Yugoslavia and headed by Prime Minister Ante Marković, it was not directly linked to the party. However, due to Marković's popularity, the party performed well in the 1990 parliamentary elections, receiving 13.3% of the vote in the first round and 16.1% in the second, winning a total of 11 seats. The party also ran in an alliance with the Young Democratic-Progressive Party (MDPS) in some areas, and with the Social Democratic Party in others. The joint SRS–MDPS candidates won six seats, whilst the alliance with the Social Democratic Party failed to win a seat.

In 1991, the party merged with the Young Democratic-Progressive Party, and was renamed Reform Forces in Macedonia–Liberal Party, before becoming the Liberal Party in June 1993. It was part of the Alliance for Macedonia in the 1994 general elections. The Alliance won 87 seats in the Assembly, whilst the Liberal Party won a further five seats running alone and one seat where it ran in alliance with the Social Democratic Union.

In April 1997, the Liberal Party merged with the Democratic Party to form the Liberal Democratic Party (LDP). However, several former members of the Liberal Party broke away from the LDP in December 1999 to re-established the party. In 1999-2001 its leader was Risto Gushterov and in 2001-2008 - again Stojan Andov.

The party ran in an alliance with the VMRO-DPMNE for the 2002 elections, but the alliance was defeated by the Together for Macedonia coalition. The two remained in an alliance with the addition of several other parties for the 2006 elections, which it emerged from as the largest bloc in the Assembly with 45 of the 120 seats, of which two were held by the Liberal Party.

In 2008-2011, its chairman was Borche Stoyanovski; in 2011-2019 its chairman was Ivon Velichkovski.

Prior to the 2008 elections the party joined Sun – Coalition for Europe alongside the Social Democratic Union (SDSM) and several other parties. The coalition lost the elections to the VMRO-DPMNE-led For a Better Macedonia alliance. The Liberal Party remained in alliance with the SDSM for the 2011 elections, again losing to the VMRO-DPMNE-led alliance. Her leader Ivon Velichkoski in 2011-2014 was a member of parliament from the opposition.

Prior to the 2014 elections, the party became part of the Citizen Option for Macedonia coalition. Party ran independently in 2016 elections, but received less than four thousand votes (0.33 %), no MPs and gradually diminished.

In the beginning of 2019, Ivon Velichkovski resigned from the party and in the mid-2019 it was officially erased from the list of the political parties of North Macedonia. In October 2021, Ivon Velichkovski founded a new political formation - Movement for a New Republic.

== Members of the Assembly ==
Term	Members	Notes
1991–1994	Stojan Andov, Time Andonov, Todor Dimov, Petar Georgiev, Gjulistana Jumerovska, Zoran Krstevski, Jovan Manchevski, Panche Minov, Simon Naumovski, Slave Naumovski, Dimitar Popovski	Elected as Union of Reform Forces members
1991–1994	Sande Davchev, Dimitar Dimitrovski, Jakim Ivanovski, Panche Nasev, Todosija Paunov, Naum Simjanovski	Elected on the joint SRS–MPDS list
1991–1994	Ivan Ivanov	Elected as joint MPDS-SPM candidate
