= Tito Petkovski =

Macedonian politician

Tito Petkovski (Macedonian: Тито Петковски) (born 23 January 1945) is a Macedonian politician, and leader of the New Social Democratic Party.

== Early life ==
Petkovski was born in Kriva Palanka, DFR Yugoslavia and was named after President of Yugoslavia Josip Broz Tito. He earned his law degree from Skopje University and went on to work in the municipal courts for the State Bureau of Physical Planning. His spouse is Trajanka Petkovska.

== Career ==
Petkovski served as Secretary of the Presidency of the League of Communists of Macedonia (SKM) from 28 November 1989 until 20 April 1991.

A SKM's city branch member, Petkovski has served as a Member of Parliament since 1991. He was Vice-President of the Assembly of the Republic of Macedonia in its first parliamentary mandate (1990-1994) and the President of the Assembly from 1996 to 1998.

Petkovski was the Social Democrats candidate in the 1999 presidential election. In the first round he took first place by a wide margin, receiving 33% of the vote. He was defeated in the second round by Boris Trajkovski, receiving 45% of the vote. A prominent member of the Social Democratic Union of Macedonia, he left the party in November 2005 to create the New Social Democratic Party.
