= Workers Party (Republic of Macedonia) =

Workers Party Работничка партија
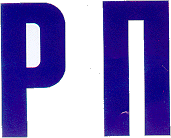
- Leader: Krste Jankovski
- Founded: June 1990
- Dissolved: 2000
- Political position: Left-wing

Workers Party (Macedonian: Работничка партија, Rabotnička partija) was a leftist political party in the Republic of Macedonia. It was established in June 1990. First president of the party was Krste Jankovski.

The RP took part in all of the elections in the 1990s. In the 1998 parliamentary elections, the RP had presented a list with 35 candidates, headed by Đuro Keškec. The party received 1,528 votes (0.14%).
