= Saško Kedev =

Macedonian politician

- Сашко Кедев
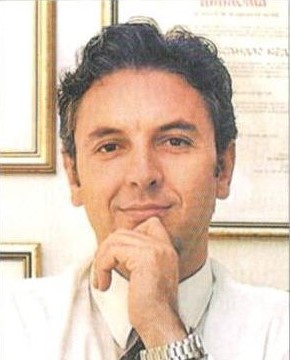
- Born: 6 July 1962 (age 64); Štip
- Education: Ss. Cyril and Methodius University in Skopje
- Occupations: Politician and physician

Saško Kedev (Macedonian: Сашко Кедев), also Sashko Kedev (born 6 July 1962) is a Macedonian politician, doctor of medical sciences, and mountaineer. He is a member of the political party VMRO-DPMNE.

== Personal life ==
Born in Štip, Kedev graduated high school in his hometown. He is a physician specialist cardiologist. From 1991 to 1993 he was a specialist at the National Heart, Lung and Blood Institute; National Institutes of Health, USA, full professor at the Faculty of Medicine at the Ss. Cyril and Methodius University in Skopje, European intervention certified cardiologist, certified intervention cardiologist in the U.S. He was director of the University Clinic of Cardiology in Skopje from 1999 to 2003. He lives in Skopje.

He was elected as a corresponding member of the Macedonian Academy of Arts and Sciences in 2015 in the Department of Medical Sciences.

== Mountaineering ==
As a mountaineer, He climbed several notable peaks in the Alps, including Mont Blanc (together with the alpinists Jovan Poposki and Nadir Murseli), Matterhorn, Weisshorn and Dufourspitze and many others. On 19 May 2009, Saško Kedev reached the summit of Mount Everest, the highest mountain in the world. With this achievement, he became the third Macedonian to summit the world's highest peak. He is also the first Macedonian to have climbed the highest peaks on all seven continents, according to the Messner list. He climbed several notable peaks in the Alps, including Mont Blanc, Matterhorn, Weisshorn and Dufourspitze.

Kedev has completed the Seven Summits, climbing the highest mountain on each continent (Messner list).

Kedev has climbed all 14 eight-thousanders, the 14 mountains in the world with an elevation of at least 8,000 metres (26,247 ft):

Mountain	Elevation (m)	Summit Date
Kilimanjaro	5,895	10-February-07
Elbrus	5,642	18-July-07
Aconcagua	6,960	30-December-07
Denali	6,190	20-June-08
Everest	8,848.86	19-May-09 (Note: Third Macedonian to climb Everest)
Mont Blanc	4,805	25-August-10
Puncak Jaya	4,884	15-September-11
Vinson Massif	4,892	25-December-12
Manaslu	8,163	27-September-21
Dhaulagiri	8,167	9-April-22
K2	8,611	22-July-22
Broad Peak	8,051	29-July-22
Annapurna I	8,091	15-April-23
Nanga Parbat	8,125	2-Jul-23
Cho Oyu	8,188	2-October-23
Makalu I	8,485	5-May-24
Lhotse	8,516	13-May-24
Gasherbrum II	8,034	22-July-24
Shishapangma	8,027	4-October-24
Kangchenjunga	8,586	23-May-25
Gasherbrum I	8,080	20-July-25 (Note: At 10:44 AM Pakistan standard time, Kedev summited his final 8-thousander)

With all of these ascents Kedev is the first Macedonian who climbed all of the 14 summits above 8000 meters.

== Guinness World Records ==
Saško Kedev is recognised by Guinness World Records with two world-record achievements: as the oldest person to climb all seven highest summits on the seven continents (the Seven Summits), and as the oldest person to climb all 14 mountains above 8,000 metres (26,247 ft). He achieved the latter record on 20 July 2025, when he reached the summit of Gasherbrum I at the age of 63 years and 14 days.

== Politics ==
From 2002 to 2006 he was a member of the Assembly of the Republic of Macedonia. In April 2004 he was a presidential candidate but lost in the second round against socialist Branko Crvenkovski.
