= Social Democratic Union of Macedonia =

Political party in North Macedonia

Social Democratic Union of Macedonia Социјалдемократски сојуз на Македонија Lidhja Socialdemokrate e Maqedonisë
- Abbreviation: SDSM (Macedonian); LSDM (Albanian)
- Leader: Venko Filipče
- Secretary-General: Aleksandar Sasa Dimitrijevikj
- Deputy Leader: Fani Karanfilovska Panovska
- Founded: 20 April 1991
- Preceded by: League of Communists of Macedonia
- Headquarters: Bihaḱka 8, Skopje
- Youth wing: Social Democratic Youth of Macedonia
- Ideology: Social democracy Pro-Europeanism
- Political position: Centre-left
- National affiliation: For a European Future
- European affiliation: Party of European Socialists (associate)
- International affiliation: Progressive Alliance; Socialist International
- Colours: Red; White
- Assembly: 15 / 120
- Mayors: 6 / 81
- Local councils: 231 / 1,345
- Skopje City Council: 5 / 45

Party flag

Website
- sdsm.org.mk

The Social Democratic Union of Macedonia (Macedonian: Социјалдемократски сојуз на Македонија – СДСМ, Socijaldemokratski sojuz na Makedonija – SDSM, Albanian: Lidhja socialdemokrate e Maqedonisë – LSDM) is a social democratic political party, and the main centre-left party in North Macedonia. The party is pro-European.

The Social Democratic Union of Macedonia was founded on 20 April 1991 at the 11th Congress of the League of Communists of Macedonia, when it was transformed into the SDSM. The Social Democratic Union of Macedonia is a member of the Progressive Alliance and an associate affiliate of the Party of European Socialists (PES). The party supported a practical solution to the Macedonia naming dispute with Greece, which succeeded under the Prespa Agreement.

== History ==
The Social Democratic Union of Macedonia was established on 20 April 1991. Its roots can be traced to 1943 upon the formation of the Communist Party of Macedonia (CPM) during World War II in the Democratic Federal Yugoslavia. The CPM became the League of Communists of Macedonia (LCM) in 1952 and was the ruling party of the Socialist Republic of Macedonia. Branko Crvenkovski was elected as the president and Nikola Popovski was elected as the vice president of the party. It retained the resources and the organisation of its predecessor. Unlike its rival VMRO-DPMNE, the party has traditionally had support from the urban middle-classes, the former Yugoslav managerial elite and the former nomenklatura.

It formed the first political government in 1992. SDSM experienced its first major split when Petar Gošev established the Democratic Party in 1993. In 1994, SDSM created the Alliance of Macedonia, together with the Socialist Party and the Liberal Party. The party formed a coalition government with the ethnic Albanian Party for Democratic Prosperity. The party's president Crvenkovski served as the prime minister of Macedonia from 1992 to 1998. Per political scientists Steven Levitsky and Lucan Way, its rule in the 1990s was competitive authoritarian as the government harassed opposition activists and "tightly control[led] public and certain private media." State television and radio monopolised national broadcasting. It initiated privatisation in the 1990s, which favoured managers of public companies, who were close to the party. Managers, supported by SDSM, bankrupted companies and took the revenues, resulting in the loss of jobs. During 1997 and the first half of 1998, Crvenkovski and his governing centre-left coalition were criticised by the public due to the high unemployment rates (42 per cent in 1997 and 41 per cent in 1998), rampant corruption, insider privatisation, dysfunctionally high levels of taxation, failure to attract foreign investment, and the slow pace of reforms aimed at giving ethnic Albanians, Turks, and Roma people equal status with ethnic Macedonians. The party lost the 1998 elections.

In 2001, SDSM was part of the short-lived government of national unity during the 2001 insurgency in Macedonia, which also consisted of VMRO-DPMNE, Party for Democratic Prosperity and Democratic Party of Albanians. After the 2002 Macedonian parliamentary election, the party became the biggest party, winning 60 out of 120 seats in the Assembly of Macedonia as the largest party of the Together for Macedonia alliance, which it co-led with the Liberal Democratic Party. Together for Macedonia ruled in coalition with the Democratic Union for Integration.

SDSM defines itself as a social democratic party. It is currently a member of the Socialist International and the Progressive Alliance, and an associate affiliate of the Party of European Socialists (PES). Crvenkovski won the 2004 presidential elections, becoming the President of Macedonia, a post that he held until May 2009. Vlado Bučkovski became the party's president, serving as party leader and Prime Minister until 2006. On 30 November 2005, a prominent member of SDSM, Tito Petkovski, who ran for president in 1999 and came in second place, left the party to form the New Social Democratic Party. This resulted in the second major split of the party. The party was defeated in the 2006 parliamentary elections, with the main reasons being the high rate of unemployment, corruption scandals, and concessions in favour of the Albanians taken to implement the Ohrid Framework Agreement.

After 2006, SDSM was led by Radmila Šekerinska. In the 2008 parliamentary elections, the coalition Sun – Coalition for Europe (of which SDSM was the leading party) was defeated, receiving 27 of the 120 seats. In the 2009 local elections, the Social Democrats won in 8 out of 84 municipalities in the country. After the electoral defeat, Šekerinska resigned and was succeeded by a mayor of Strumica, Zoran Zaev. In May 2009, after finishing the 5-year-term as President of Macedonia, Crvenkovski returned to the SDSM and was re-elected as leader of the party. He reorganised the party profoundly, but resigned after the party's defeat in the 2013 local elections. In June 2013, Zaev was elected as the leader.

The party was defeated in the 2014 general elections by the VMRO-DPMNE, but the results were not recognised and the opposition parties boycotted the Parliament. From February to May 2015, Zaev released wiretapped material that incriminated Prime Minister Nikola Gruevski for illegally spying on more than 20,000 citizens. In May, large protests including SDSM members began in Skopje. Large crowds gathered to protest on 17 May, demanding resignation from Gruevski, who refused to step down and organized a pro-government rally the following day. The number of protesters was estimated to be more than 40,000. Zaev claimed the number of protesters reached 100,000, and said that some of them will remain there until Gruevski resigns. European Union diplomats offered to mediate a solution to the crisis. The political crisis was resolved with the Pržino Agreement in July 2015, which obliged a resignation from Gruevski, participation of SDSM in the ministries, and early parliament elections. In the elections on 11 December 2016, the party won almost 440,000 votes and 49 MPs which was the second-best result in SDSM's history, after the result from 2002. In April 2017, SDSM formed a coalition with the Albanian parties (Democratic Union for Integration, Besa, and Alliance for Albanians) and in the next month, it formed a government. The party won 57 municipalities in the local elections in October. During the government's rule, North Macedonia joined NATO and agreements with Bulgaria and Greece were also signed, with the latter resolving the Macedonia naming dispute.

Before the 2020 parliamentary elections, the party rebranded, changing its logo to be similar to other European social democratic parties, and changing its primary colour to red. In the elections, it campaigned for continuing to pursue membership in the EU. It created a government in August after winning 46 seats. After its defeat in the 2021 local elections in North Macedonia when it lost 57 municipalities, Zaev stepped down as the party's president. On 12 December 2021, the party's internal leadership elections were held and the former deputy Finance Minister, Dimitar Kovačevski, was elected as the party's president and he became the prime minister in January 2022. In the 2024 parliamentary election, the party had its worst result, winning only 18 seats in the Assembly. It resulted in the resignation of the party's leadership. On 30 June, the former health minister of North Macedonia, Venko Filipče, became the party's president.

== Party leaders ==
The old logo of SDSM

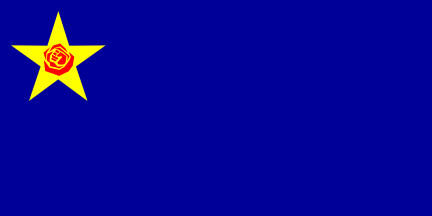
Old party flag

- Branko Crvenkovski (1991–2004)
- Vlado Bučkovski (2004–2006)
- Radmila Šekerinska (2006–2008)
- Zoran Zaev (2008–2009)
- Branko Crvenkovski (2009–2013)
- Zoran Zaev (2013–2021)
- Dimitar Kovačevski (2021–2024)
- Venko Filipče (2024–present)

== Election results ==
=== Presidential elections ===
Election	Party candidate	Votes	%	Votes	%	Result
Election	Party candidate	First Round		Second Round		Result
1994	Kiro Gligorov	715,087	78.4%	-	-	Elected ✓
1999	Tito Petkovski	343,606	33.1%	513,614	46.8%	Lost ✗
2004	Branko Crvenkovski	385,347	42.5%	550,317	62.6%	Elected ✓
2009	Ljubomir Frčkoski	202,691	20.54%	264,828	36.86%	Lost ✗
2014	Stevo Pendarovski	326,164	38.56%	398,077	42.67%	Lost ✗
2019	Stevo Pendarovski	322,581	44.75%	436,212	53.59%	Elected ✓
2024	Stevo Pendarovski	180,499	20.49%	251,899	30.99%	Lost ✗

=== Assembly elections ===
Election	Party leader	In coalition with	Votes	%	Seats	+/–	Position	Government
Election	Party leader	In coalition with	(Coalition totals)		(Coalition totals)		Position	Government
1990	Petar Goshev	None	220,748	27.70%	31 / 120	▲31	▲2nd	Government
1994	Branko Crvenkovski	LPM-SPM	329,700	53.50%	95 / 120	▲64	▲1st	Government
1998	Branko Crvenkovski	None	279,799	25.14%	30 / 120	▼60	▼2nd	Opposition
2002	Branko Crvenkovski	LDP-DPT-DLB-USR-DPD	494,744	41.58%	60 / 120	▲33	▲1st	Government
2006	Vlado Bučkovski	LDP-DPT-DLB-USR-DPD	218,164	23.31%	32 / 120	▼30	▼2nd	Opposition
2008	Radmila Šekerinska	NSDP-LDP- LPM	233,284	23.64%	27 / 120	▼5	2nd	Opposition
2011	Branko Crvenkovski	NSDP-NSDP-SEB-LPM-SPS-PPER-UTLS-SSD	368,496	32.78%	42 / 120	▲15	2nd	Opposition
2014	Zoran Zaev	NSDP-LDP-UM-SPER	283,955	26.22%	34 / 120	▼8	2nd	Opposition
2016	Zoran Zaev	NSDP-LDP-DOM-SPER	436,981	37.87%	49 / 120	▲15	2nd	Government
2020	Zoran Zaev	"We Can"; BESA-NSDP-LDP-VMRO–NP-DOM-DS-TDP-THP-POPGM	327,408	35.89%	46 / 120	▼3	▲1st	Government
2024	Dimitar Kovačevski	"For a European Future"; NSDP-LDP-VMRO–NP-DOM-POPGM	153,250	15.36%	18 / 120	▼28	▼2nd	Opposition
