= Communist Party of Macedonia (1992) =

Communist Party of Macedonia Комунистичката партија на Македонија
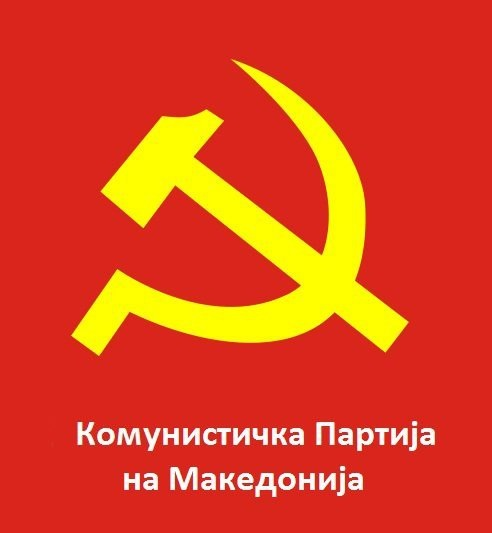
- Leader: Pero Odzhaklieski
- Founded: 1992
- Headquarters: Skopje
- Ideology: Communism; Marxism–Leninism; Hard Euroscepticism
- Political position: Far-left
- National affiliation: Levica
- European affiliation: INITIATIVE (Before 2023)
- International affiliation: IMCWP
- Colours: Red

The Communist Party of Macedonia (Macedonian: Комунистичката партија на Македонија, romanized: Komunističkata partija na Makedonija; Albanian: Partia Komuniste e Maqedonisë) also as League of Communists of Macedonia – Freedom Movement, is a Marxist-Leninist party in North Macedonia. The party was de-registered due to low membership in 2007; however, it remains active and participates in the International Meeting of Communist and Workers' Parties. In 2015, it was one of three principal creators, along with the Movement for Social Justice "Lenka" and members of the Left Movement "Solidarity", of the new political party Levica. Levica won 2 seats in the 2020 North Macedonian parliamentary election.
