= Branko Crvenkovski =

President of Macedonia from 2004 to 2009

- Бранко Црвенковски
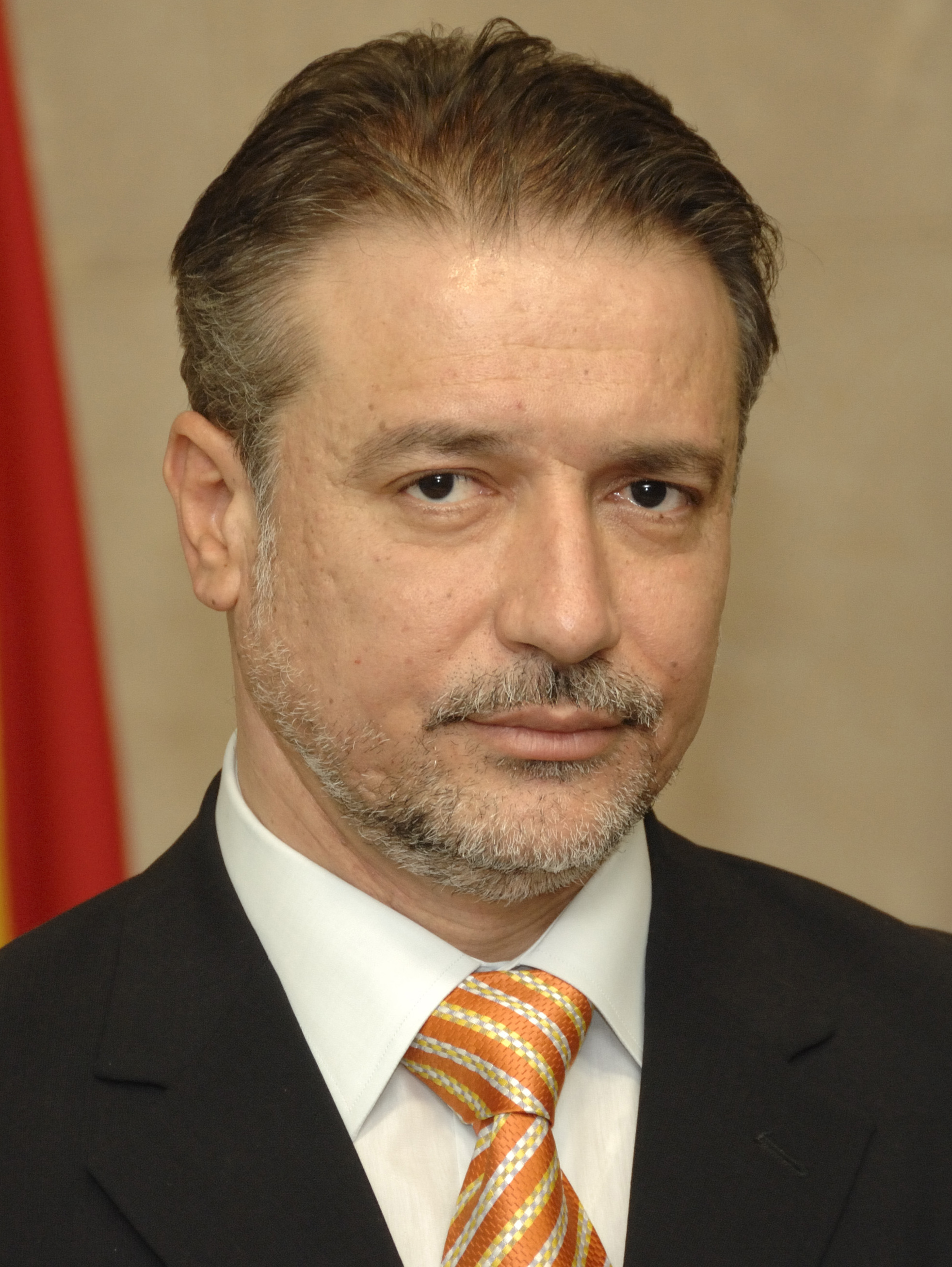
- Crvenkovski in 2008

President of Macedonia
- In office 12 May 2004 – 12 May 2009
- Prime Minister: Radmila Šekerinska (Acting); Hari Kostov; Radmila Šekerinska (Acting); Vlado Bučkovski; Nikola Gruevski
- Preceded by: Boris Trajkovski
- Succeeded by: Gjorge Ivanov

Prime Minister of Macedonia
- In office 1 November 2002 – 12 May 2004
- President: Boris Trajkovski; Ljupčo Jordanovski
- Preceded by: Ljubčo Georgievski
- Succeeded by: Radmila Šekerinska (Acting)
- In office 4 September 1992 – 30 November 1998
- President: Kiro Gligorov; Stojan Andov; Kiro Gligorov
- Preceded by: Nikola Kljusev
- Succeeded by: Ljubčo Georgievski

Personal details
- Born: 12 October 1962 (age 63) Sarajevo, PR Bosnia and Herzegovina, FPR Yugoslavia
- Party: League of Communists of Macedonia (1986–1991); Social Democratic Union of Macedonia (from 1991)
- Spouse: Jasna Crvenkovska
- Education: Ss. Cyril and Methodius University in Skopje

Branko Crvenkovski (Note: Macedonian: Бранко Црвенковски, pronounced ['brankɔ t͡sr̩'vɛnkɔfski]) (born 12 October 1962) is a Macedonian politician who served as the President of Macedonia (now North Macedonia) from 2004 to 2009. He previously served as Prime Minister of Macedonia from 1992 to 1998 and from 2002 to 2004.

A former member of the League of Communists of Macedonia (SKM), Crvenkovski became the president of the Social Democratic Union of Macedonia (SDSM) in 1991, the legal successor of the SKM. He was SDSM's leader on two occasions.

== Early life and career ==
Crvenkovski was born on 12 October 1962 in Sarajevo, People's Republic of Bosnia and Herzegovina, Federal People's Republic of Yugoslavia. His father was an officer in the Yugoslav People's Army. His family returned to live in Skopje in 1963.

In 1986, he obtained a bachelor's degree in Computer Science and Automation from the Faculty of Electrical Engineering at the Ss. Cyril and Methodius University in Skopje. In the same year, he was elected as member of the Central Committee of the League of Communists of Macedonia (SKM). In 1990, he was elected as member of the Presidency of SKM and the Assembly of the Socialist Republic of Macedonia at the first multi-party elections in Yugoslavia and as the head of the Commission of Foreign Affairs after serving for several years as head of the computer engineering department at the Semos company in Skopje. SKM was transformed into the political party Social Democratic Union of Macedonia in April 1991 and he was elected as its president.

== Prime Minister of Macedonia and leader of opposition ==
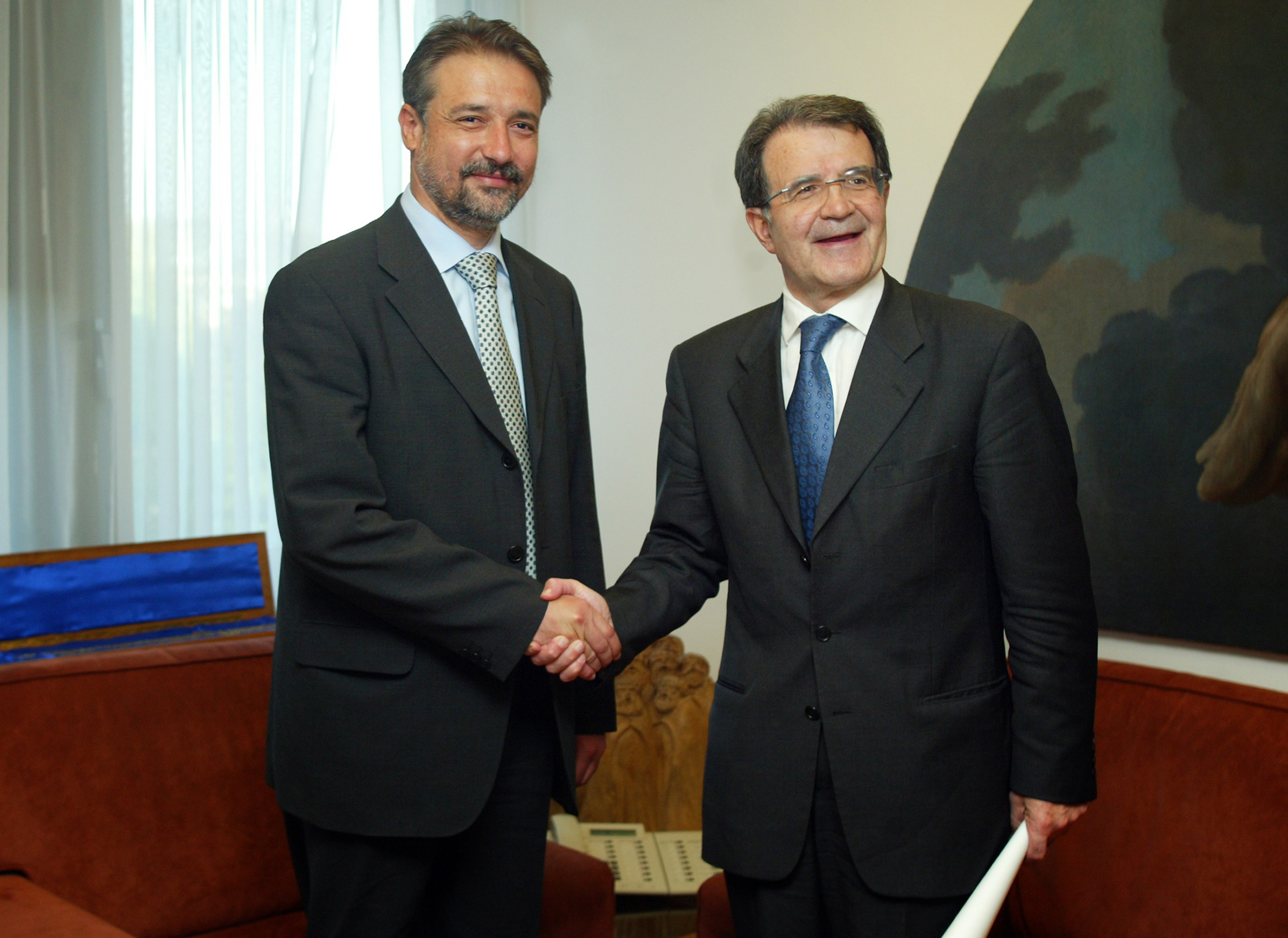
Crvenkovski with President of the European Commission Romano Prodi, 7 May 2003

On 4 September 1992, Crvenkovski became Macedonia's second prime minister after its secession from Yugoslavia and continued in the post for another four years following the December 1994 elections. With president Kiro Gligorov's support, he gave four cabinet posts to Albanians, helping to maintain inter-ethnic peace. His government had initiated the ineffective 1993 privatization program. Managers backed by SDSM, due to their incompetency or dishonesty, ended up bankrupting many companies and took the profits for themselves, while also privatizing many companies indiscriminately, which led to a loss of many jobs. The first generation of oligarchs emerged after Crvenkovski completed the first wave of privatization with the support of the Administration for Security and Counterintelligence. Crvenkovski reorganized the government in 1996 due to his plummeting popularity as a result of the country's bad economic conditions. During 1997 and 1998, Crvenkovski and his center-left coalition were subject to criticism and pressure over high unemployment rates (42 percent in 1997, 41 percent in 1998), rampant corruption, insider privatization, dysfunctionally high levels of taxation, failure to attract foreign investments, and the slow pace of reforms to grant ethnic Albanians, Turks and Romani people equal status with ethnic Macedonians. He held his post until 30 November 1998, after losing the election to VMRO-DPMNE. He participated in the government of national unity during the 2001 insurgency in Macedonia. Crvenkovski was a signatory of the Ohrid Framework Agreement, which ended the conflict.

Crvenkovski participated in the elections on 15 September 2002 with his party SDSM under the Together for Macedonia coalition. He became the prime minister again on 1 November 2002, forming a government with the ethnic Albanian party Democratic Union for Integration. He held the post until 12 May 2004. Hari Kostov succeeded him as prime minister.

== Presidency (2004–2009) ==
Crvenkovski won the April 2004 presidential election against Saško Kedev and took office on 12 May 2004. Despite winning, he did so with a lower Albanian turnout because Albanians perceived him as responsible for police repression against them in Tetovo in 1995 and Gostivar in 1997. In 2005, Crvenkovski suggested the construction of a monument in honor of Yugoslav leader Josip Broz Tito in the center of Skopje, arguing that he deserved recognition for contributing to the Macedonian nation. World War II veterans expressed enthusiasm about the proposal and placed a bust in honor of Tito in Bitola.

Crvenkovski did not run for a second term in the March 2009 presidential election. Instead, he returned to his party and was elected to be the head of the party on 24 May 2009. In 2013, he was succeeded by Zoran Zaev.

== Personal life ==
He is married to Jasna Crvenkovska, having a son and a daughter. In 2022, he became a grandfather. Crvenkovski is an Honorary Member of Raoul Wallenberg Foundation.

== See also ==
- List of state visits made by Branko Crvenkovski

== Notes ==
Political offices
Preceded by Nikola Kljusev	Prime Minister of Macedonia; 1992–1998	Succeeded by Ljubčo Georgievski
Preceded by Ljubčo Georgievski	Prime Minister of Macedonia; 2002–2004	Succeeded by Radmila Šekerinska; Acting
Preceded by Boris Trajkovski	President of Macedonia; 2004–2009	Succeeded by Gjorge Ivanov
