= VMRO-DPMNE =

Macedonian political party

Internal Macedonian Revolutionary Organization – Democratic Party for Macedonian National Unity Внатрешна македонска револуционерна организација – Демократска партија за македонско национално единство
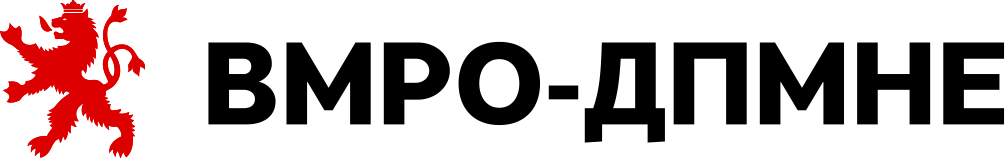
- Abbreviation: VMRO-DPMNE
- Leader: Hristijan Mickoski
- Secretary-General: Gjorgjija Sajkoski
- Vice-President: Aleksandar Nikoloski; Vlado Misajlovski; Timčo Mucunski; Gordana Dimitrievska Kocovska
- Founders: Ljubčo Georgievski; Dragan Bogdanovski; Boris Zmejkovski; Gojko Jakovlevski
- Founded: 17 June 1990
- Headquarters: Skopje
- Youth wing: Youth Force Union
- Ideology: Conservatism; Christian democracy; Macedonian nationalism
- Political position: Centre-right to right-wing
- National affiliation: Your Macedonia
- European affiliation: European People's Party (associate)
- International affiliation: International Democracy Union
- Colours: Red; Black; Gold
- Assembly: 55 / 120
- Mayors: 54 / 80
- Local councils: 549 / 1,345
- Skopje City Council: 18 / 45

Website
- vmro-dpmne.org.mk

The Internal Macedonian Revolutionary Organization – Democratic Party for Macedonian National Unity (Macedonian: Внатрешна македонска револуционерна организација – Демократска партија за македонско национално единство, romanized: Vnatrešna makedonska revolucionerna organizacija – Demokratska partija za makedonsko nacionalno edinstvo), abbreviated as VMRO-DPMNE (Macedonian: ВМРО–ДПМНЕ), is a conservative and the main centre-right to right-wing political party in North Macedonia.

It was established as a nationalist and anti-communist party. It has later rebranded itself as Christian-democratic. The party claims that their goals and objectives are to express the tradition of the Macedonian people on whose political struggle and concepts it is based. Nevertheless, it has formed multiple coalition governments with ethnic minority parties. Under the leadership of Ljubčo Georgievski in the 1990s, the party supported Macedonian independence from Socialist Yugoslavia, and led a policy of closer relationships with Bulgaria. Georgievski left VMRO-DPMNE and formed the VMRO – People's Party in 2004.

Under the leadership of Nikola Gruevski, the party promoted ultranationalist identity politics in the form of antiquisation. Its nationalist stances were often also anti-Albanian. During Gruevski's leadership, the party contributed to the country's democratic backsliding and led an authoritarian regime. Under Gruevski's successor, Hristijan Mickoski, the party has rejected the foreign policy of the previous ruling coalition, led by SDSM, especially the handling of relations with Greece and Bulgaria. The party has promoted under Gruevski and Mickoski identity-based politics, combined with radical populism and soft Euroscepticism rooted in concerns over concessions to Macedonian national identity during the EU accession process.

== Background ==
The party's full name consists of the acronyms "VMRO" (standing for Vnatrešna Makedonska Revolucionerna Organizacija and referencing the Internal Macedonian Revolutionary Organization (IMRO), a rebel movement formed in 1893) and "DPMNE" (Democratic Party for Macedonian National Unity, Demokratska partija za makedonsko nacionalno edinstvo). After undergoing various transformations, the original organisation was suppressed after the military coup d'état of 1934, in its headquarters in Bulgaria. At that time the territory of the current North Macedonia was a province called Vardar Banovina, part of the Kingdom of Yugoslavia. As the Bulgarian army entered Yugoslav Macedonia as German satellite during WWII, former IMRO members were active in organising Bulgarian Action Committees, charged with taking over the local authorities. After Bulgaria switched to side with the Allied powers in September 1944, they tried to create a pro-Bulgarian independent Macedonian state under the protectorate of the Third Reich. VMRO–DPMNE claims ideological descent from the old IMRO, although there is no known continuity between the two organisations. The historical IMRO was as a whole pro-Bulgarian grouping, and its membership was allowed initially only for Bulgarians.

== History ==
=== Foundation and rise to power ===
Following the death of Yugoslav President Josip Broz Tito in 1980, SFR Yugoslavia began to disintegrate and democratic politics were revived in Macedonia. Many exiles returned to then SR Macedonia from abroad, and a new generation of young Macedonian intellectuals rediscovered the history of Macedonian nationalism. Dragan Bogdanovski, who was a proclaimed Macedonian rights movement activist, had created the political program for the Democratic Party for Macedonian National Unity on 23 January 1990 in Stockholm, Sweden. A meeting at the end of May happened between Ljubčo Georgievski and Bogdanovski, Boris Zmejkovski, and a few other activists, where they agreed to make the party. Under the name VMRO–DPMNE, it was founded on 17 June 1990 in Skopje, as a Macedonian nationalist and anti-communist party. Georgievski was elected as the party's first president in the constituent assembly. The party advocated for the independence of Macedonia, the withdrawal of the Yugoslav National Army, creation of a Macedonian defence force, establishment of an independent currency and international recognition as a sovereign state.

After the first multi-party elections in 1990, VMRO–DPMNE became the strongest party in the parliament. It did not form a government because it did not achieve a majority of seats; this forced it to form a coalition with an ethnic Albanian party, but it refused to do so. The party boycotted the second round of the 1994 elections claiming fraud in the first round. During the early 1990s, the party presented itself as an extreme right-wing nationalist party with anti-Albanian sentiments. It also promoted the irredentist concept of United Macedonia. By the mid-1990s, it created offices in most major cities. The party opposed the 1995 Interim Accord with Greece. During that period, the party moderated its rhetoric. After winning the 1998 election, VMRO–DPMNE formed a coalition government with the Democratic Alternative and Democratic Party of Albanians (DPA), with Georgievski as prime minister. VMRO-DPMNE finished the process of privatisation initiated by SDSM as public companies were privatised by businessmen close to the party or by the party itself. According to the International Monetary Fund, 60% of the privatisations went to insiders. In 1999, VMRO–DPMNE's candidate Boris Trajkovski was elected president. Under Georgievski, there was an improvement in Bulgaria–Macedonia relations. He signed a bilateral agreement with Bulgarian prime minister Ivan Kostov regarding good neighbourly relations.

In 2001, the party participated in a government of national unity. VMRO–DPMNE's government was defeated at the 2002 parliamentary elections. In an alliance with the Liberal Party of Macedonia, VMRO–DPMNE won 28 out of 120 seats. In 2004, Trajkovski died in a plane crash and Branko Crvenkovski was elected president, defeating VMRO–DPMNE's candidate Saško Kedev. After losing the 2002 elections, Georgievski left the party and established the VMRO-NP in 2004.

Nikola Gruevski was elected as the new leader of the party in May 2003. The widespread public support for EU membership in the 2000s encouraged the party to evolve into a moderate and pro-European party. It also rebranded itself as centre-right and Christian democratic. VMRO-DPMNE opposed the legalisation of the Tetovo University in early 2004. The party became the largest party in parliament again after a net gain of over a dozen seats in the 2006 parliamentary elections. With 44 of 120 seats, the party formed a government in coalition with the DPA again, with Gruevski becoming the prime minister. In its 2006 party programme, it emphasised the pursuit of EU and NATO membership as its major foreign policy goals. On 15 May 2007, the party became an observer-member of the European People's Party. With its rise to power in 2006, unemployment decreased, having declined from 37% in 2005 to 28% in 2014.

The party won 2008 early parliamentary elections. In the 120-seat Assembly, VMRO–DPMNE won 63 seats and formed a coalition government with the Democratic Union for Integration (DUI). Along with DUI, it used the Ohrid Framework Agreement not to apply meritocracy for employment in the public administration, as minority parties employed people based on ethnic criteria. In 2009, the VMRO–DPMNE-led coalition "For a better Macedonia" won 56 out of 84 municipalities, the party's presidential candidate Gjorge Ivanov also won the presidential election. The party won again in the 2011 early parliamentary elections. VMRO–DPMNE won 56 seats of the 120-seat Assembly of the Republic of Macedonia, the party formed a government in coalition with the Democratic Union for Integration in the Macedonian Parliament (mandate period 2011–2015). In 2014, early parliamentary elections were held together with the presidential election, VMRO–DPMNE won again 61 seats of the 120-seat Assembly and formed a government in coalition with the Democratic Union for Integration (mandate period 2014–2018).

=== Antiquisation and Skopje 2014 ===
The party pursued the "antiquisation" policy between 2006 and 2017, in which it sought to claim ancient Macedonian figures like Alexander the Great and Philip II of Macedon for the country. The policy was pursued since its coming to power in 2006, and especially since Macedonia's non-invitation to NATO in 2008, as a way of putting pressure on Greece as well as in an attempt to construct a new identity on the basis of a presumed link to the world of antiquity. The policy received academic criticism as it demonstrated feebleness of archaeology and other historical disciplines in public discourse, as well as a danger of marginalization. The policy also attracted criticism domestically, by ethnic Macedonians within the country, who saw it as dangerously dividing the country between those who identify with classical antiquity and those who identify with the country's Slavic culture. Ethnic Albanians saw it as an attempt to marginalise them and exclude them from the national narrative. Bulgaria also accused the country of falsification of history. According to researcher Anastas Vangeli, it harmed interethnic relations and the country's international position. Foreign diplomats warned that the policy reduced international sympathy for Macedonia's position in the naming dispute with Greece. SDSM was opposed to the Skopje 2014 project and alleged that the monuments could have cost six to ten times less than what the government paid, which may already have exceeded 600 million euros. In 2012, a statue of the member of the IMRO Simeon Radev, who was also a Bulgarian diplomat, was installed on the building of the Ministry of Foreign Affairs but it was later taken down, and according to Makfax, with the explanation that it had been a mistake. The party built new headquarters for itself in Skopje in 2015.

=== Macedonian political crisis ===
In the 2010s and the 2020s, Georgievski criticised the party many times, seeing it as a personal failure and a fake party without any ideology, claiming it is pro-Serbian and leads a policy of strong Serbianisation, etc.

In 2015, it was revealed that Macedonian citizens were wiretapped, which resulted in a political crisis. The political parties signed the internationally mediated Pržino Agreement to resolve the crisis, which also resulted in the resignation of Gruevski in January 2016. In 2016, paintings depicting the party's leadership in the Soviet socialist realist style were mocked on social media locally. In December 2016, after the early parliamentary election, the party's leadership issued a list of threats, such as "put an end to foreign meddling, stop negotiations under EU or US mediation, and fight against NGOs financed from abroad", whose tone was characterised as anti-Western and anti-democratic by political scientist Jasmin Mujanovic. Between 2006 and 2017, the Republic of Macedonia ruled by a government led by VMRO-DPMNE, had experienced democratic backsliding due to monopolisation of power and abuse of state institutions and public resources. Clientelist employments were used to gain political support. Due to VMRO-DPMNE's competitive authoritarian regime, there was unequal access to both state-owned and private-owned media. During its rule under Gruevski, media freedom decreased, with the majority of media outlets being favourable towards the government and unfavourable towards the political opposition. VMRO-DPMNE had established control over the majority of the media outlets. Under VMRO-DPMNE, pressure was applied on the media through threats and violence against journalists, control of the public broadcaster Macedonian Radio Television, and placement of government advertisements on favourable media outlets. According to media freedom ranking published by international non-governmental organisation Reporters Without Borders, Macedonian media freedom decreased from 36th place in 2007 to 118th place in 2016. After 2015, under international and domestic pressure, caused by the wiretapping affair, the VMRO-DPMNE government refrained from using public money to place pro-government advertisements in private media. Per political scientist Dimitri A. Sotiropoulos, the media was subject to the worst level of government interference in Southeastern Europe. Gruevski and VMRO-DPMNE had full control over the judiciary, actively intervening in court decisions, making political deals over appointments of judges, maintaining records of favourable and unfavourable judges, and giving promotions based on political loyalty. They also had control over the Judicial Council and thus controlled appointment, evaluation, promotion, discipline, and dismissal of judges.

The Macedonian Special Prosecution in 2017 ordered investigation against the party's former leader and ex-Prime Minister Nikola Gruevski, as well as ministers and other high-ranked officials, for involvement in illegal activities. In 2018, amid ongoing investigations, a Skopje court froze the party's property assets. Gruevski himself was sentenced to two years in prison for the illegal purchase of a Mercedes car in 2018 but fled to Hungary when he was ordered to serve his prison sentence. Nevertheless, he remained an honorary chairman of the party until July 2020. Former VMRO-DPMNE governmental ministers, such as Gordana Jankulovska and Mile Janakieski, were sentenced to prison on corruption charges. Per doctor of international relations and history of diplomacy Gurakuç Kuçi, the party had followed a significant pro-Serbian and pro-Russian policy under Gruevski's leadership. According to political scientist Irena Rajchinovska Pandeva, the VMRO-DPMNE-led government had managed to create a very strong anti-EU sentiment in the country during his leadership.

=== Mickoski's leadership ===
Hristijan Mickoski became the leader of the party on 23 December 2017, replacing Gruevski. VMRO-DPMNE has seen the Friendship Treaty with Bulgaria from 2017 and the Prespa Agreement with Greece from 2018 as betrayal of national interests. On 16 October 2018, US Assistant Secretary of State Wess Mitchell sent a letter to Mickoski, in which he expressed the disappointment of the United States with the positions of the party's leadership, including him personally, regarding its position against the Prespa agreement and asked him to "set aside partisan interests" and work to get the name change approved. Despite the party's opposition, eight deputies of the party voted in favour of the initiation of the constitutional amendments to allow the country's name change. As a result, the party expelled prominent members and requested resignations from members who supported the agreement.

In April 2022, a Bulgarian club named after the last leader of the historical IMRO, Ivan Mihailov, was officially opened in Bitola. After its opening, the club was set on fire, and Mickoski demanded that the arsonist, who was arrested, be released. The deputy chairman of the party Alexander Nikoloski expressed later his support to the decision of the Commission for Protection against Discrimination, which announced that the club "Ivan Mihailov" is discriminative towards the citizens of the country on national and ethnic grounds. VMRO-DPMNE deputy Rashela Mizrahi declared also the last leader of the organisation whose name it bears to be a fascist. Later, the party submitted a bill demanding that such names be banned for use in the country to increase distancing from fascism and Nazism. The bill was adopted, in collaboration with the Social Democratic Union of Macedonia.

The party became the main oppositional force which participated in the 2022 North Macedonia protests, surrounding its accession into the EU. In September 2022, the party proposed a referendum under which the friendship treaty between Bulgaria and North Macedonia would be denounced. The party is against the recognition of the Bulgarians in North Macedonia as an official ethnic minority, which is conditio sine qua non the country to become a member of the EU. VMRO-DPMNE argued that the proposal leads to "Bulgarianisation" of the country. (Note: In 2025, Mickoski stated that constitutional changes could not proceed unless the EU provided credible assurances that this would be the final identity-related demand and that Bulgaria would not be able to impose further vetoes based on historical or linguistic disputes after the amendment was adopted. Furthermore, as the European Court of Human Rights has repeatedly found Bulgaria in violation of international conventions regarding the Macedonian minority, and its recommendations have remained unimplemented, Mickoski's government regards their implementation by Sofia as a second condition for introducing constitutional changes.) In this way, the party effectively halted the European integration of North Macedonia. Per political scientist Yorgos Christidis, VMRO-DPMNE has been sceptical to the pro-Western orientation of North Macedonia.

The party won the 2024 parliamentary elections. The party had won the elections based on denouncing the foreign policy of the previous government, opposing the 2017 treaty with Bulgaria, the Prespa Agreement, and the French proposal as "bad agreements for Macedonia's national interests". It formed a government with VLEN and ZNAM in June.

== Youth Force Union ==
The Youth Force Union (Macedonian: Унија на млади сили на ВМРО-ДПМНЕ), also known as UMS (Macedonian: УМС), is the youth wing organisation of the VMRO-DPMNE, formed in 1991.

A number of projects arising from the Youth Force Union were conducted in the past 20 years. It organised demonstrations against the introduction of the Albanian language in the pedagogical faculty of the University of Skopje in 1997.

== Election results ==
=== Presidential elections ===
Election	Party candidate	Votes	%	Votes	%	Result
Election	Party candidate	First round		Second round		Result
1994	Ljubiša Georgievski	197,109	21.6%	–	–	Lost ✗
1999	Boris Trajkovski	219,098	21.1%	582,808	53.2%	Elected ✓
2004	Saško Kedev	309,132	34.1%	329,179	37.4%	Lost ✗
2009	Gjorge Ivanov	345,850	35.04%	453,616	63.14%	Elected ✓
2014	Gjorge Ivanov	449,442	51.69%	534,910	55.28%	Elected ✓
2019	Gordana Siljanovska-Davkova	318,341	44.16%	377,713	46.41%	Lost ✗
2024	Gordana Siljanovska-Davkova	363,085	41.21%	561,000	69.01%	Elected ✓

=== Assembly elections ===
Election	Party leader	Vote		%	Seats	+/–	Position	Government
1990	Ljubčo Georgievski	First round	154,101	14.3%	38 / 120	▲38	▲1st	Opposition
1990	Ljubčo Georgievski	Second round	238,367	29.9%	38 / 120	▲38	▲1st	Opposition
1994	Ljubčo Georgievski	First round	141,946	14.3%	0 / 120	▼38		Extra-parliamentary
1994	Ljubčo Georgievski	Second round	Boycotted		0 / 120	▼38		Extra-parliamentary
1998	Ljubčo Georgievski	First round	312,669	28.1%	49 / 120	▲49	▲1st	Government
1998	Ljubčo Georgievski	Second round	381,196	49%	49 / 120	▲49	▲1st	Government
2002	Ljubčo Georgievski	298,404		25%	33 / 120	▼16	▼2nd	Opposition
2006	Nikola Gruevski	303,543		32.5%	45 / 120	▲12	▲1st	Government
2008	Nikola Gruevski	481,501		48.48%	63 / 120	▲18	1st	Government
2011	Nikola Gruevski	438,138		39.98%	56 / 123	▼7	1st	Government
2014	Nikola Gruevski	481,615		42.98%	61 / 123	▲5	1st	Government
2016	Nikola Gruevski	454,519		38.14%	51 / 120	▼10	1st	Opposition
2020	Hristijan Mickoski	315,344		34.57%	44 / 120	▼7	▼2nd	Opposition
2024	Hristijan Mickoski	436,407		44.58%	58 / 120	▲14	▲1st	Government

== See also ==
- List of political parties in North Macedonia
