= Democratic Party of Turks of Macedonia =

Turkish minority political party in North Macedonia

Democratic Party of Turks of Macedonia Makedonya Türk Demokratik Partisi Демократска партија на Турците на Македонија
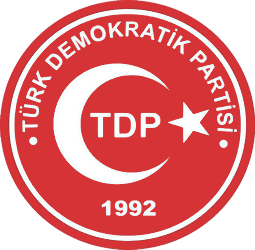
- Leader: Zülfikar Zeynula
- Founded: 1 July 1990 (as political organisation); 27 June 1992 (as political party)
- Headquarters: Skopje
- Youth wing: Sait Aleivi
- Ideology: Turkish minority interests Turkish nationalism
- Political position: Centre
- National affiliation: None, European Front (until 2025)
- Colours: Red, White
- Parliament: 1 / 123
- Mayors: 1 / 81

Party flag

Website
- http://www.tdp.org.mk/

The Democratic Party of Turks of Macedonia (Macedonian: Демократска партија на Турците на Македонија, Demokratska partija na Turcite na Makedonija; Turkish: Makedonya Türk Demokratik Partisi) is a political party of the Turkish minority in North Macedonia. In the 2002 parliamentary elections, the party joined the SDSM-led coalition and won 2 seats. In the 2006 parliamentary elections, it joined the SDSM-led coalition and won 2 parliamentary seats. The Party was a part of the VMRO-DPMNE coalition for 8 years from 2008 to 2016. The Party has one member, Yusuf Hasani, in the Macedonian parliament. The party did participate in a coalition with SDSM-Besa in the 2020 parliamentary elections. The party did participate in a coalition with European Front-Democratic Union for Integration in the 2024 parliamentary elections.

In July 2026, The Democratic Party of the Turks of Macedonia signed an agreement with VMRO-DPMNE to join the governing Your Macedonia coalition, increasing the parliamentary majority to 59 MPs.

== See also ==
- Turks of North Macedonia
- North Macedonia–Turkey relations
