= Party for Democratic Prosperity =

Party for Democratic Prosperity - Partia për Prosperitet Demokratik
- Abbreviation: PDP
- Leader: Abduladi Vejseli
- Founded: April 1990
- Ideology: Albanian minority politics

The Party for Democratic Prosperity or PDP (Albanian: Partia për Prosperitet Demokratik, PPD; Macedonian: Партија за демократски просперитет, ПДП, romanized: Partija za demokratski prosperitet, PDP) is an ethnic Albanian political party in North Macedonia. The party was formed in April 1990 and is currently led by Abduladi Vejseli.

From 1992 to 1998, the PDP was part of the coalition governments led by the SDSM. After the split of the radical wing from the party in February 1994, PDP was generally considered to be moderate party that could cooperate with Macedonian parties, although sometimes frictions between the PDP and the other government parties arose as a consequence of the ethnic questions. For example, the party leadership criticized the 1991 Census for allegedly underreporting the percentage of the population that was Albanian from 40% to only 21%. Also, the PDP deputies voted against adopting the constitution due to its lack of protection for minorities.

From the 1998 elections onwards, PDP is in opposition and since then the support for the PDP has eroded considerably. At the 2002 legislative elections, the party won 2.3% of the popular vote and 2 out of 120 seats. At the 2011 legislative elections, the party won 0.03% of the popular vote and consequently gained no seats in parliament.
