= Democratic Alternative (North Macedonia) =

Democratic Alternative Демократска алтернатива
- Leader: Vasil Tupurkovski
- Founded: March 1998
- Ideology: Conservatism
- Political position: Centre
- Colours: Rainbow

The Democratic Alternative (Macedonian: Демократска алтернатива, ДА, Demokratska Alternativa) or DA is a centrist political party in North Macedonia. The Democratic Alternative was formed in March 1998 by Vasil Tupurkovski, charismatic member of the last Presidency of the former Yugoslavia.

Prior to the 1998 elections, DA entered into a coalition with VMRO-DPMNE with which it won the elections and formed a ruling government. The period in the government of this party, from the end of 1998 to the end of 2000, will be remembered mostly for the controversial decision to recognize the Republic of China instead of the People's Republic of China. DA argued that such diplomatic move would help North Macedonia attract significant foreign investment from Taiwan - with even a sum of US$1 billion being mentioned by Tupurkovski. All of this proved to be only a dream, as Taiwanese money never came even after recognition from North Macedonia. By 2002 North Macedonia formally reversed its decision on Taiwan and after much wrangling re-established diplomatic relations with the People's Republic of China.

In addition to causing major problems for North Macedonia's economy and international relations, the embarrassing fiasco cost DA its political future.

In the 2002 election, the party won only 1.43% of the popular vote and no seats.
