= Politics of North Macedonia =

Politics in North Macedonia occur within the framework of a parliamentary representative democratic republic, whereby the Prime Minister is the head of government, and of a multi-party system. Executive power is exercised by the government. Legislative power is vested in both the government and parliament. The Judiciary is independent of the executive and the legislature. The Economist Intelligence Unit rated North Macedonia a "flawed democracy" in 2022.

== Political system ==
North Macedonia's six electoral constituencies

The political system of North Macedonia consists of three branches: Legislative, Executive and Judicial. The Constitution is the highest law of the country. The political institutions are constituted by the will of its citizens by secret ballot at direct and general elections. Its political system of parliamentary democracy was established with the Constitution of 1991, which stipulates the basic principles of democracy and guarantees democratic civil freedom. The Elections for Representatives in the Assembly of North Macedonia is held in October. The Assembly is composed of 123 Representatives, who are elected for a period of four years. Out of this number, 120 are elected proportionally in 6 constituencies of 20 each, and 3 according to the majority principle, specifically for the diaspora (depending on turnout) (the territory of the Republic of North Macedonia representing one constituency). There are approximately 1.5 million voters registered in the General Electoral Roll for the election of Representatives in the Assembly of North Macedonia in 2.973 polling stations. The voting for the representatives is conducted according to the list system.

=== Presidents ===
- Kiro Gligorov (1991–1999)
- Boris Trajkovski (1999–2004)
- Branko Crvenkovski (2004–2009)
- Gjorge Ivanov (2009–2019)
- Stevo Pendarovski (2019–2024)
- Gordana Siljanovska-Davkova (2024–present)

== Executive branch ==
Main office-holders
Office	Name	Party	Since
President	Gordana Siljanovska-Davkova	VMRO-DPMNE	12 May 2024
Prime Minister	Hristijan Mickoski	VMRO-DPMNE	23 June 2024

=== President ===
Coat of arms of the president of North Macedonia

- cannot hold any other public office or position in a political party
- is elected for a 5-year term and can serve a maximum of two terms
- is Commander-in-Chief of the Armed Forces and President of the Security Council
- nominates a candidate from the majority party or parties in the Assembly who then proposes the Government who are elected by the Assembly
- makes diplomatic appointments and some judicial and Security Council appointments
- grants decorations, honours and pardons

=== Government ===
The power of the president is fairly limited with all other executive power being vested in what the Constitution describes as the government, i.e., the prime minister and ministers.

Ministers:

- cannot be Representatives in the Assembly
- cannot hold any other public office or follow a profession while in office
- are elected by a majority vote in the Assembly
- are granted legal immunity
- cannot be called for service in the Armed Forces
- propose laws, budget and regulations to be adopted by the Assembly
- control diplomatic policy
- make other state appointments

=== Current cabinet ===
The current cabinet is a coalition of VMRO-DPMNE, the VLEN, and ZNAM. The members of the Cabinet of North Macedonia are chosen by the Prime Minister and approved by the Assembly, however certain cabinet level positions are chosen by both President and Prime Minister, and approved by the Assembly.

Current government as of 24 December 2025

Member	Portfolio	Logo
Hristijan Mickoski	Prime Minister	
Ljupco Dimovski	Deputy Prime Minister in charge of Framework Agreement Implementation, Political system, Minister without Portfolio	
Ivan Stoilković	Deputy Prime Minister in charge of Community Relations, Minister without Portfolio	
Orhan Murtezani	Deputy Prime Minister in charge of European Integration, Minister without Portfolio	
Arben Fetaj	Deputy Prime Minister in charge of Good Governance Policies, Minister without Portfolio	
Aleksandar Nikolovski	Deputy Prime Minister in charge of Transport and Communication	
Timčo Mucunski	Minister of Foreign Affairs	
Vlado Misajlovski	Minister of Defense	
Panče Toshkovski	Minister of Internal Affairs	
Gordana Dimitrievska Kočovska	Minister of Finance	
Igor Filkov	Minister of Justice	
Cvetan Tripunovski	Minister of Agriculture, Forestry and Water Supply	
Fatmir Levani	Minister of Economy	
Azir Aliu	Minister of Health	
Muhammad Hoxha	Minister of Environment and Physical Planning	
Vesna Janevska	Minister of Education and Science	
Borko Ristovski	Minister of Sport	
Stefan Andonovski	Minister of Digital Transformation	
Goran Minčev	Minister of Information Society and Administration	
Zlatko Perinski	Minister of Local Self-Government	
Zoran Lyutkov	Minister of Culture	
Gjoko Velkovski	Minister of Labor and Social Policy	
Elvin Hasan	Minister without Portfolio for Attracting foreign investment	
Xhemail Çupi	Minister without Portfolio	
Zoran Sapurić	Minister without Portfolio to improve investment climate for domestic enterprises	
Anita Angelovska-Bežoska	Governor of the National Bank of the Republic of North Macedonia	
Ljupco Švrgovski	Attorney General	
Saško Lafčiski	Chief of the General Staff of the Army of the Republic of North Macedonia	

== Legislative branch ==
The Assembly (Sobranie / Kuvendi) has 120 members, elected for a four-year term, by proportional representation. There are between 120 and 140 seats, currently there are 120; members are directly elected in multi-seat constituencies by closed list proportional representation vote. There is a possibility of three people being directly elected in diaspora constituencies by a simple majority vote provided there is sufficient voter turnout.

=== 2020 election result ===
Early parliamentary elections were held in North Macedonia on 15 July 2020. It was originally scheduled for November 2020, but Prime Minister Zoran Zaev called early elections after the European Council failed to come to an agreement on starting talks with North Macedonia on joining the European Union in October 2019. The election date was set for 12 April, but was postponed until July due to the COVID-19 pandemic in North Macedonia.

=== 2024 election result ===
The election resulted in a landslide victory for the national conservative VMRO-DPMNE and its Your Macedonia coalition, winning 58 seats in the Assembly, just three shy of an outright majority. Their main rivals, the incumbent pro-European SDSM and its For a European Future coalition, ended up in distant third place, winning 18 seats, their worst ever result. All other parties and coalitions that won seats include: the European Front coalition with 18 seats and the VLEN Coalition with 14 seats (both representing national minorities), the left-wing nationalist The Left with six seats, as well as the left-wing populist For Our Macedonia Movement (ZNAM) with six seats. Turnout was 55%. While initially allocated 19 and 13 seats respectively, following repollings in Ohrid, Struga and other areas on 22 May 2024 led to the European Front losing one seat in favor of the VLEN coalition allowing SDSM and its For a European Future coalition to become the second biggest group in the Assembly.

Graph of the party split among 120 seats.
Party	Votes	%	Seats	+/–
Your Macedonia (Note: Consists of VMRO-DPMNE, Socialist Party of Macedonia (SPM), Democratic Party of Serbs in Macedonia (DPSM), Democratic Union (DS), MAAK – Conservative Party (MAAK), Movement for the National Unity of the Turkish (DNET), Serbian Progressive Party in Macedonia (SNSM), Bosniak People's Party (BNP), Democratic Forces of the Roma (DSR), Party of United Democrats of Macedonia (PODEM), Roma Alliance of Macedonia (ROM), Party of the Vlachs of Macedonia (PVM), VOICE for Macedonia (GLAS), New Liberal Party (NLP), Social Democratic Union (SDU), Democratic Party of the Roma (DPR), Workers’ Agricultural Party of Macedonia (RZPRM), United Party for Roma Equality (OPER), Dignity, Permanent Macedonian Radical Unification (TMRO), United for Macedonia and Macedonian Concept (MK).) (Note: 55 seats won by VMRO-DPMNE, 2 by SPM and 1 by DPSM.)	436,407	44.58	58	+14
For a European Future (Note: Consists of Social Democratic Union of Macedonia (SDSM), Liberal Democratic Party (LDP), New Social Democratic Party (NSDP), VMRO – People's Party (VMRO–NP), Party for the Movement of Turks (PDT), Democratic Renewal of Macedonia (DOM), Party of United Pensioners and Citizens of Macedonia (POPGM), Serbian Party in Macedonia (SSM), Democratic Union of the Vlachs of Macedonia (DSVM), Union of Roma in Macedonia (SRM), Party of Democratic Action of Macedonia (SDAM), Right (Desnica), Party for the Democratic Prosperity of the Roma (PDPR) and Party for Social and Economic Progress (POEN).) (Note: 15 seats won by SDSM, 2 by NDSP and 1 by LDP.)	154,447	15.78	18	–28
European Front (Note: Consists of Democratic Union for Integration (BDI), Alliance for Albanians (ASH) (Sela's - led), Democratic Party of Albanians (PDSH), Democratic European Party (EDP), People's Movement (LP), Democratic Party of Turks (TDP), Movement of Turks for Justice and Democracy (THDH), Roma Union (UR) and Bosniak Democratic Union (BDS).) (Note: 10 seats won by BDI, 4 by ASH, 1 by PDSH, 1 by LP, 1 by TDP and 1 by THDH.)	137,690	14.06	18	+3
VLEN Coalition (Note: Consists of Democratic Movement (LD), Alternativa (AAA), Alliance for Albanians (ASH) (Taravari's - led) and Besa Movement (BESA).) (Note: 6 seats won by ASH, 3 by BESA, 3 by LD and 2 by AAA.)	106,937	10.92	14	+2
The Left	68,637	7.01	6	+4
For Our Macedonia	56,232	5.74	6	New
Brave for Macedonia (Note: Consists of Citizen Option for Macedonia (GROM), Party for the Full Emancipation of the Roma of Macedonia (PCERM) and Integra - Macedonian Conservative Party (Integra))	4,522	0.46	0	–1
New Alternative	3,515	0.36	0	0
Avaja	2,908	0.30	0	New
Your Party	1,794	0.18	0	0
United Macedonia	1,688	0.17	0	New
Homeland Macedonia	1,099	0.11	0	New
Macedonian Era Third – Sovereignists	966	0.10	0	New
Democrats Skopje	912	0.09	0	0
The Right	535	0.05	0	New
Labour Party	450	0.05	0	0
European Civic Movement	241	0.02	0	New
Total	978,980	100.00	120	0
Valid votes	978,980	97.27		
Invalid/blank votes	27,451	2.73		
Total votes	1,006,431	100.00		
Registered voters/turnout	1,815,350	55.44		
Source: SEC

== Judicial branch ==
Judiciary power is exercised by courts, with the court system being headed by the Judicial Supreme Court, Constitutional Court and the Republican Judicial Council. The assembly appoints the judges, of which there are 22 in the Supreme Court, and 9 in the Constitutional Court. Supreme Court judges nominated by the Judicial Council, a 7-member body of legal professionals, and appointed by the Assembly; Constitutional Court judges appointed by the Assembly for nonrenewable, 9-year terms.

== Administrative divisions ==
With the passage of a new law and elections held in 2005, local government functions are divided between 78 municipalities (општини, opštini; singular: општина, opština. The capital, Skopje, is governed as a group of ten municipalities collectively referred to as "the City of Skopje". Municipalities in North Macedonia are units of local self-government. Neighbouring municipalities may establish cooperative arrangements.

== Ethnic diversity ==
The country's main political divergence is between the largely ethnically based political parties representing the country's Macedonian majority and Albanian minority. The issue of the power balance between the two communities led to a brief war in 2001, following which a power-sharing agreement was reached. In August 2004, the Republic's parliament passed legislation redrawing local boundaries and giving greater local autonomy to ethnic Albanians in areas where they predominate.

== Foreign relations ==
North Macedonia is member of the ACCT, BIS, CE, CEI, EAPC, EBRD, ECE, FAO, IAEA, IBRD, ICAO, ICCt, ICRM, IDA, IFAD, IFC, IFRCS, ILO, IMF, IMO, Interpol, IOC, IOM, ISO, ITU, NATO, OPCW, OSCE, PCA, PFP, UN, UNCTAD, UNESCO, UNIDO, UPU, WCL, WCO, WHO, WIPO, WMO, WToO, WTrO

== See also ==
- Electoral units of North Macedonia
