= 2024 North Macedonian parliamentary election =

- 8 May 2024
- All 120 seats in the Assembly; 61 seats needed for a majority
- Turnout: 55.44% (▲3.42pp)
Party	Leader	Vote %	Seats	+/–
Your Macedonia	Hristijan Mickoski	44.58	58	+14
For a European Future	Dimitar Kovačevski	15.78	18	−28
European Front	Ali Ahmeti	14.06	18	+3
VLEN	Bilal Kasami	10.92	14	+2
Levica	Dimitar Apasiev	7.01	6	+4
ZNAM	Maksim Dimitrievski	5.74	6	New
This lists parties that won seats. See the complete results below.
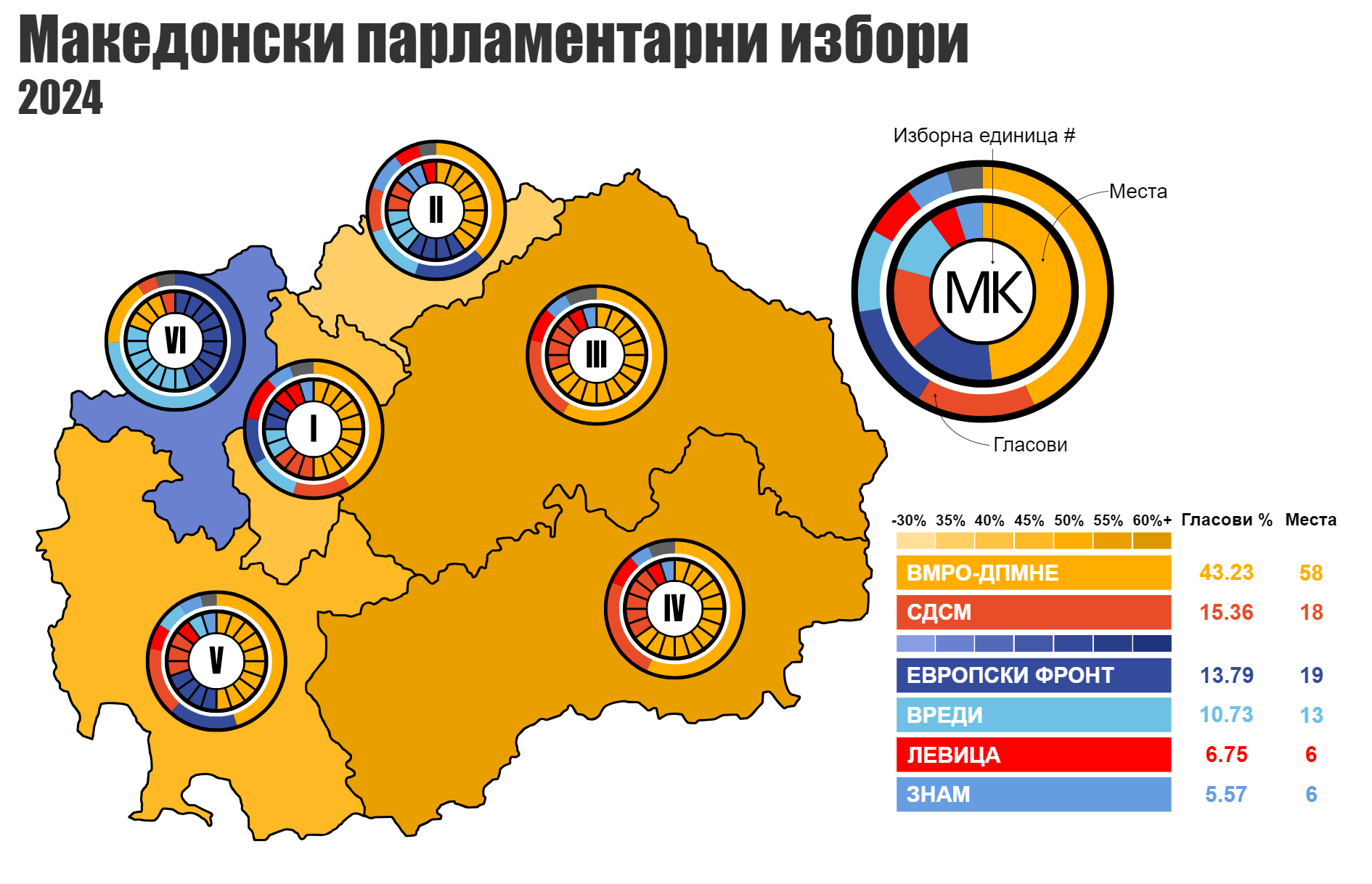
Results by constituency
Prime Minister before	Prime Minister after
Talat Xhaferi; BDI	Hristijan Mickoski; VMRO-DPMNE

Parliamentary elections were held in North Macedonia on 8 May 2024. The slow pace of EU integration and corruption were the main issues during the campaign.

The right-wing opposition coalition Your Macedonia, led by the nationalist VMRO-DPMNE party, decisively won the election. The coalition received 45% of the vote and 58 seats, 3 short of an outright majority. The incumbent center-left coalition led by the Social Democratic Union of Macedonia collapsed to 16% of the popular vote and lost 28 seats. The second round of the 2024 presidential election was held on the same day, and was won by the VMRO-DPMNE candidate, Gordana Siljanovska-Davkova.

== Electoral system ==
North Macedonia's six constituencies

Of the 123 seats in the Assembly of the Republic, 120 are elected from six 20-seat constituencies in North Macedonia using closed list proportional representation, with seats allocated using the d'Hondt method. The remaining three seats are elected by Macedonians living abroad, but are only filled if the number of votes exceeds that of the elected candidate with the fewest votes in North Macedonia in the previous election. If a list crosses this threshold, it wins one seat; to win two seats, a list needs to win twice the number of votes, and to win three seats the threshold is three times the number of votes. These seats were not filled in the 2016 elections due to insufficient turnout.

For this election, more than 1,700 candidates were running for the Assembly.

== Campaign ==
Among significant issues during the election was corruption. The opposition VMRO-DPMNE accused the ruling coalition of presiding over a "pandemic" of corruption in the country, while the Social Democratic Union of Macedonia, a member of the coalition, supported the confiscation of illegally acquired property from corrupt officials. The ruling government supported revising the Constitution to include recognition of a Bulgarian minority in North Macedonia, a condition set by Bulgaria to allow the country's accession to the European Union. The VMRO-DPMNE called the acceptance of such conditions a "capitulation" to Bulgaria. It has also expressed interest in forming a coalition government with the VLEN coalition comprising ethnic Albanian parties but has ruled out entering into one with the Democratic Union for Integration, which is part of the ruling coalition and which it had called "corrupt". The VMRO-DPMNE also pledged to create tens of thousands of jobs amid the country's sluggish economic situation, mass emigration and rising inflation.

== Opinion polls ==
Local regression of the main political parties before the 2024 election.

Polling firm	Fieldwork date	Sample size	For a European Future		VLEN			European Front			Your Macedonia	Levica	ZNAM	Others	Lead
Polling firm	Fieldwork date	Sample size	SDSM	LDP/DOM	Besa	LD	A	ASh (Note: In early 2024 two factions emerged within ASh. A faction led by incumbent leader Arben Taravari intended to join VLEN and he later became the coalition's presidential candidate, while a faction led by former leader Ziadin Sela eventually joined the European Front coalition. Both wings of the party held conferences and elected their respective leader as party chairman. The Macedonian electoral commission lists ASh as a member of VLEN, while a court decision ruled that Sela is the official party leader. The decision is being appealed.)	BDI	PDSh	VMRO-DPMNE	Levica	ZNAM	Others	Lead
2024 election	8 May 2024	978,980	15.78		10.92			14.06			44.58	7.01	5.74	1.91	28.8
2024 presidential election	24 Apr 2024	881,039	20.5		9.5			13.7			41.2	4.7	9.5	0.9 (Note: Bravely for Macedonia)	20.7
CRPC	20 Apr 2024	1250	25.6	—N/a	14.5			9.5			38	7.2	5.0	0.2	11.2
МКД.мк	8–13 Apr 2024	1200	22.8		9.9			12.7			41.2	6.5	6.1	0.8	18.4
CRPC	8–13 Apr 2024	1210	26.8	—N/a	12.7			11.3			37.5	6.4	5.3	—N/a	10.7
МКД.мк	15–24 Mar 2024	1200	16.0		11.5			1.6	13.0	—N/a	40.8	7.9	8.2	0.7	24.8
CRPC	4–7 Mar 2024	1085	24.6	—N/a	13.6			11.6			39.4	5.5	5.3	—N/a	14.8
IPIS	20 Feb 2024	1212	21.8	—N/a	8.6			4.1	11.5	—N/a	38.6	6.0	5.0	2.4	18.8
IPDV	5–9 Nov 2023	1050	23.0	—N/a	4.4	3.3	1.6	8.2	9.7	—N/a	35.6	5.9	—N/a	8.2	12.6
IPIS	29 Oct 2023	1055	21.8	—N/a	4.4	1.9	3.5	3.9	10.8	—N/a	36.2	6.8	5.6	2.1	17.4
IPIS	23–26 May 2023	1,112	21.6	—N/a	4.4	—N/a	—N/a	5	12.4	—N/a	38.2	12.3	5.7	0.8	16.6
IRI	8 Apr – 4 May 2023	1,204	17	—N/a	7	—N/a	2	8	14	—N/a	32	11	—N/a	7 (Note: DPTM 2%)	15
NDI	13–14 Apr 2023	1,003	23.6	—N/a	6.6	—N/a	—N/a	6.3	11.4	—N/a	39.6	10.3	3.1	2	16
IPIS	Mar 2023	1,114	27.1	—N/a	8.5			4.9	27.1 (Note: BDI and SDSM together)	—N/a	39.2	10.1	9.2	—N/a	11.1
IDSCS	22 Feb – 9 Mar 2023	1,002	24	—N/a	2	—N/a	—N/a	7	18	—N/a	38	9	—N/a	—N/a	14
МКД.мк	6–16 Feb 2023	1,200	22.3	0.2	4.1	—N/a	—N/a	6.7	14.7	—N/a	39.2	8.1	—N/a	3.4	16.9
IRI	19 Dec 2022	1,200	16.3	—N/a	7.0	—N/a	—N/a	7.8	13.3	—N/a	33.3	12.3	—N/a	8.8	17
МКД.мк	7–13 Nov 2022	1,200	20.3	0.9	7.3	—N/a	3.5	3.9	13.6	0.7	40.9	8.9	—N/a	1.1	20.6
IPIS	4–6 May 2022	1,111	30.1	—N/a	2.8	—N/a	1.9	7.1	13.4	—N/a	39.4	5.4	—N/a	—N/a	9.3
IPIS	19–22 Oct 2021	1,102	28.9	2.8	2.6	—N/a	8.0		11.0	—N/a	37.7	6.6	—N/a	—N/a	8.8
2021 Skopje election	17 Oct 2021	–	24.04	4.20	1.00	—N/a	5.17		11.91	—N/a	35.89	9.19	—N/a	4.17 (Note: Green Humane City)	11.9
Kantar TNS Brima	27 Aug – 9 Sep 2021	1,201	30.8		7.4	—N/a	—N/a	9.5	11.4	1.7	27.6	7.4	—N/a	—N/a	3.2
Kantar TNS Brima	28 May – 16 Jun 2021	1,194	33.0		6.8	—N/a	—N/a	10.3	11.0	2.8	28.5	7.5	—N/a	—N/a	4.5
Kantar TNS Brima	4–6 Apr 2021	1,222	27.9		6.6	—N/a	—N/a	8.2	11.5	1.6	27.9	9.8	—N/a	—N/a	Tie
IPIS	1–4 Mar 2021	1,109	31.9		1.7	—N/a	8.9		10.4	—N/a	34.7	6.6	—N/a	—N/a	2.8
M-Prospect	16–24 Dec 2020	1,000	31.7		4.1	—N/a	0.9	7.8	11.4	2.4	30.8	10.6	—N/a	0.3 (Note: Integra – Macedonian Conservative Party)	0.9
2020 parliamentary election	15 Jul 2020	–	35.89			—N/a	8.95		11.48	1.53	34.57	4.10	—N/a	3.49	1.3

=== Hypothetical polls ===
==== Nikola Gruevski forms a new party ====
Polling firm	Fieldwork date	Sample size	SDSM	LDP/DOM	Besa	PDSh	A	ASh	VMRO-DPMNE	BDI	Levica	ZNAM	Gruevski	Others	Lead
Stratum R&D	1–6 Oct 2023	1,112	27.5	—N/a	7.3			4.7	17.6	10.8	9.1	3.1	16.0	3.8	9.9

== Results ==
The election resulted in a landslide victory for the national conservative VMRO-DPMNE and its Your Macedonia coalition, winning 58 seats in the Assembly, just three shy of an outright majority. Their main rivals, the incumbent pro-European SDSM and its For a European Future coalition, ended up in distant third place, winning 18 seats, their worst ever result. All other parties and coalitions that won seats include: the European Front coalition with 18 seats and the VLEN Coalition with 14 seats (both representing national minorities), the left-wing nationalist The Left with six seats, as well as the left-wing populist For Our Macedonia Movement (ZNAM) with six seats. Turnout was 55%. While initially allocated 19 and 13 seats respectively, following repollings in Ohrid, Struga and other areas on 22 May 2024 led to the European Front losing one seat in favor of the VLEN coalition allowing SDSM and its For a European Future coalition to become the second biggest group in the Assembly.

Graph of the party split among 120 seats.
Party	Votes	%	Seats	+/–
Your Macedonia (Note: Consists of VMRO-DPMNE, Socialist Party of Macedonia (SPM), Democratic Party of Serbs in Macedonia (DPSM), Democratic Union (DS), MAAK – Conservative Party (MAAK), Movement for the National Unity of the Turkish (DNET), Serbian Progressive Party in Macedonia (SNSM), Bosniak People's Party (BNP), Democratic Forces of the Roma (DSR), Party of United Democrats of Macedonia (PODEM), Roma Alliance of Macedonia (ROM), Party of the Vlachs of Macedonia (PVM), VOICE for Macedonia (GLAS), New Liberal Party (NLP), Social Democratic Union (SDU), Democratic Party of the Roma (DPR), Workers’ Agricultural Party of Macedonia (RZPRM), United Party for Roma Equality (OPER), Dignity, Permanent Macedonian Radical Unification (TMRO), United for Macedonia and Macedonian Concept (MK).) (Note: 55 seats won by VMRO-DPMNE, 2 by SPM and 1 by DPSM.)	436,407	44.58	58	+14
For a European Future (Note: Consists of Social Democratic Union of Macedonia (SDSM), Liberal Democratic Party (LDP), New Social Democratic Party (NSDP), VMRO – People's Party (VMRO–NP), Party for the Movement of Turks (PDT), Democratic Renewal of Macedonia (DOM), Party of United Pensioners and Citizens of Macedonia (POPGM), Serbian Party in Macedonia (SSM), Democratic Union of the Vlachs of Macedonia (DSVM), Union of Roma in Macedonia (SRM), Party of Democratic Action of Macedonia (SDAM), Right (Desnica), Party for the Democratic Prosperity of the Roma (PDPR) and Party for Social and Economic Progress (POEN).) (Note: 15 seats won by SDSM, 2 by NDSP and 1 by LDP.)	154,447	15.78	18	–28
European Front (Note: Consists of Democratic Union for Integration (BDI), Alliance for Albanians (ASH) (Sela's - led), Democratic Party of Albanians (PDSH), Democratic European Party (EDP), People's Movement (LP), Democratic Party of Turks (TDP), Movement of Turks for Justice and Democracy (THDH), Roma Union (UR) and Bosniak Democratic Union (BDS).) (Note: 10 seats won by BDI, 4 by ASH, 1 by PDSH, 1 by LP, 1 by TDP and 1 by THDH.)	137,690	14.06	18	+3
VLEN Coalition (Note: Consists of Democratic Movement (LD), Alternativa (AAA), Alliance for Albanians (ASH) (Taravari's - led) and Besa Movement (BESA).) (Note: 6 seats won by ASH, 3 by BESA, 3 by LD and 2 by AAA.)	106,937	10.92	14	+2
The Left	68,637	7.01	6	+4
For Our Macedonia	56,232	5.74	6	New
Brave for Macedonia (Note: Consists of Citizen Option for Macedonia (GROM), Party for the Full Emancipation of the Roma of Macedonia (PCERM) and Integra - Macedonian Conservative Party (Integra))	4,522	0.46	0	–1
New Alternative	3,515	0.36	0	0
Avaja	2,908	0.30	0	New
Your Party	1,794	0.18	0	0
United Macedonia	1,688	0.17	0	New
Homeland Macedonia	1,099	0.11	0	New
Macedonian Era Third – Sovereignists	966	0.10	0	New
Democrats Skopje	912	0.09	0	0
The Right	535	0.05	0	New
Labour Party	450	0.05	0	0
European Civic Movement	241	0.02	0	New
Total	978,980	100.00	120	0
Valid votes	978,980	97.27		
Invalid/blank votes	27,451	2.73		
Total votes	1,006,431	100.00		
Registered voters/turnout	1,815,350	55.44		
Source: SEC

== Aftermath ==
Social Democrat leader Dimitar Kovačevski conceded defeat and announced that he would resign as party leader once a successor had been elected. VMRO-DPMNE leader Hristijan Mickoski said that “the people have taught the government its most important lesson and saved their country" and pledged to hold into account “every last person who committed a crime and committed corruption".

According to international observers, the elections were "competitive and an extensive and pluralistic campaign helped voters to make an informed choice, but marred by negative rhetoric with nationalistic slogans, as well as shortcomings in the legislation and insufficient oversight of campaign finances".

On 6 June, Mickoski was formally asked by President Gordana Siljanovska-Davkova to form the next government, after he had unveiled a coalition agreement with the VLEN Coalition and For Our Macedonia (ZNAM). The investiture vote for Mickoski took place on 24 June, with 77 votes in favor, 22 against and 21 absent. The cabinet is expected to have 24 members, of which sixteen from the VMRO-DPMNE-led coalition Your Macedonia, six from the VLEN coalition block of Albanian opposition parties, and two from ZNAM.

== Reactions ==
- Hungary — Prime Minister Viktor Orbán congratulated the VMRO-DPMNE on its "well-deserved and historic victory" in the presidential and parliamentary elections. Orban added that he looked forward to working together on giving North Macedonia a "new momentum to the EU accession process".
- United States — Ambassador Angela Aggeler expressed her congratulations "to all those citizens who exercised their right to vote in the presidential and parliamentary elections."
