= 2014 Macedonian general election =

- Presidential election
- 13 April 2014 (first round); 27 April 2014 (second round)
- Turnout: 48.87% (first round); 54.38% (second round)
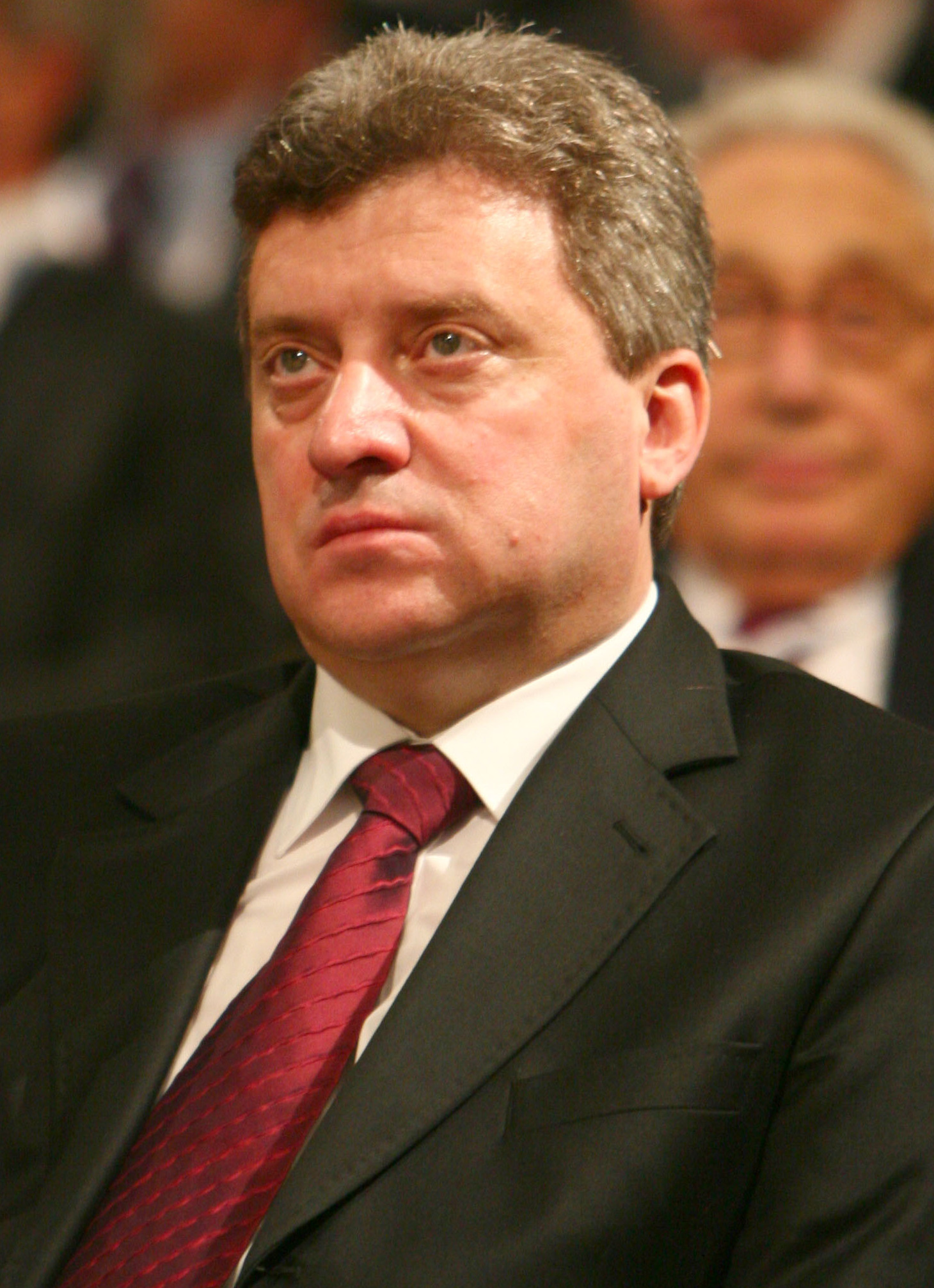

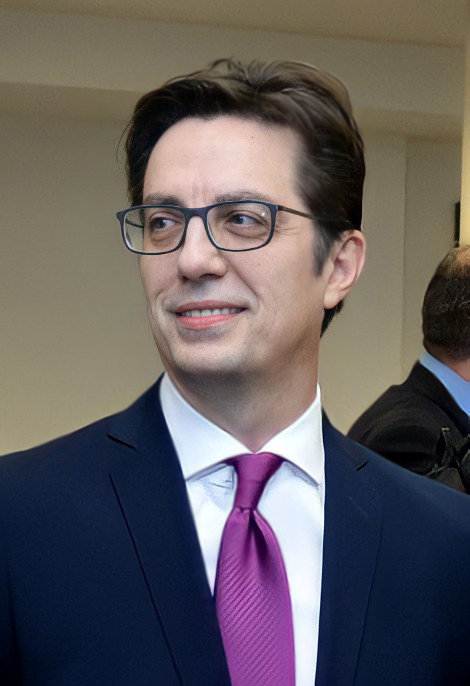
| Nominee | Gjorge Ivanov | Stevo Pendarovski |
| Party | VMRO-DPMNE | SDSM |
| Popular vote | 534,910 | 398,077 |
| Percentage | 57.33% | 42.67% |
President before election
Gjorge Ivanov
VMRO-DPMNE
Elected President
Gjorge Ivanov
VMRO-DPMNE
- Parliamentary election
- 27 April 2014
| Party | Leader | Vote % | Seats | +/– |
|---|---|---|---|---|
| VMRO-DPMNE coalition | Nikola Gruevski | 44.47 | 61 | +5 |
| SDSM coalition | Zoran Zaev | 26.22 | 34 | −8 |
| BDI | Ali Ahmeti | 14.19 | 19 | +4 |
| PDSh | Menduh Thaçi | 6.13 | 7 | −1 |
| GROM | Stevčo Jakimovski | 2.92 | 1 | New |
| RDK | Rufi Osmani | 1.64 | 1 | −1 |
This lists parties that won seats. See the complete results below.
| Prime Minister before | Prime Minister after |
|---|---|
| Nikola Gruevski; VMRO-DPMNE | Nikola Gruevski; VMRO-DPMNE |

General elections^{[a]} were held in the Republic of Macedonia in April 2014 to elect the President and members of parliament. The first round of the presidential elections were held on 13 April, with incumbent president Gjorge Ivanov finishing first with 53% of the vote. However, as he did not receive the support of 50% of all registered voters, a second round was held on 27 April, alongside parliamentary elections, with Ivanov and the ruling coalition led by VMRO-DPMNE claiming victory as Ivanov was elected president and the VMRO-DPMNE won 61 of the 123 seats in the Assembly.

== Background ==
The parliamentary elections were brought forward to coincide with the presidential election following the failure of coalition partners VMRO-DPMNE and DUI to agree on a combined presidential candidate.

== President ==
=== Candidates ===
The incumbent president Gjorge Ivanov, supported by the governing party, the Internal Macedonian Revolutionary Organization – Democratic Party for Macedonian National Unity (VMRO-DPMNE), successfully nominated himself for reelection after collecting 63,253 signatures from citizens. The Social Democratic Union of Macedonia (SDSM) candidate Stevo Pendarovski was nominated by the signatures of the opposition parties' members of parliament. Other candidates nominated by over 10,000 signatures included Zoran T. Popovski from the Citizen Option for Macedonia (GROM), and Ilijaz Halimi from the Democratic Party of Albanians (DPA).

=== Campaign ===
The first round of the presidential election was held on 13 April. The candidates were Gjorge Ivanov (VMRO-DPMNE), Stevo Pendarovski (SDSM), Ilijaz Halimi (DPA), and Zoran Popovski (GROM). The ethnic Albanian party Democratic Union for Integration (DUI), a junior coalition member, campaigned for boycott of the presidential election, opposing VMRO-DPMNE's decision to run Ivanov for reelection.

SDSM's Pendarovski visited Pristina where he criticised the government policies in terms of foreign policy and that Albania has the highest GDP in the region despite reports by institutions and other politicians saying it was Macedonia.

== Parliament ==
=== Parties and coalitions ===
Fourteen political parties and coalitions contested the election, having submitted candidate lists for MPs in at least one of the six constituencies within the country and the three in the diaspora. Three among them, namely, VMRO-DPMNE, SDSM and DUI, submitted their candidate lists in all nine constituencies.

==== VMRO-DPMNE ====
The VMRO-DPMNE-led coalition consisted of 22 parties: VMRO-DPMNE, the Socialist Party of Macedonia (SPM), the Democratic Union (DS), Democratic Renewal of Macedonia (DOM), the Democratic Party of Turks (DPTM), the Democratic Party of Serbs in Macedonia (DPSM), the Union of Roma in Macedonia (SRM), the United Party for Emancipation (OPE), the Party of Justice (PP), the Party of the Democratic Action of Macedonia (SDAM), the Party of the Vlachs of Macedonia (PVM), the Party for Integration of the Roma (PIR), the Bosniak Democratic Party (BDP), Democratic Forces of the Roma (DSR), Permanent Macedonian Radical Unification (TMRO), the New Liberal Party (NLP), the People's Movement for Macedonia (NDM), VMRO–Democratic Party, VMRO-United, Fatherland's Macedonian Organisation for Radical Renewal–Vardar–Aegean–Pirin (TMORO–VEP), Macedonian Alliance (MA), and VMRO–Macedonian.

==== SDSM ====
The SDSM-led coalition included nine parties; the Social Democratic Union of Macedonia, the New Social Democratic Party (NDSP), the Liberal Democratic Party (LDP), United for Macedonia (OM), the Party for the Movement of Turks in Macedonia (PDT), the Party for the Full Emancipation of the Roma of Macedonia (PCER), the Serbian Party in Macedonia (SSM), the Democratic Union of the Vlachs of Macedonia (DSVM), and the Sandžak List (SL).

==== GROM ====
The Citizen Option for Macedonia (GROM)-led alliance consisted of the Citizen Option for Macedonia, the Liberal Party, the Serbian Progressive Party in Macedonia, the Union of Tito's Left Forces, and the Party of Free Democrats.

=== Campaign ===
SDSM's Zoran Zaev said that the election was about "choosing whether [the country] will support the fight for freedom and the right to a better life, or continue with state robbery." Prime Minister Nikola Gruevski said: "We need a majority so nobody can blackmail us and we can keep up with the programme...that would lead Macedonia into the EU and NATO."

== Opinion polls ==
=== President ===
| Poll source | Date | Sample size | Ivanov VMRO-DPMNE | Pendarovski SDSM | Halimi DPA | Popovski GROM | None | Undecided |
|---|---|---|---|---|---|---|---|---|
| Center for Information and Research (CIG) | March 2014 | 2,400 | 29.3% | 19.4% | 6.1% | - | 8.7% | 35% |
| Center for Research and Analysis | March 2014 | 1,839 | 42.2% | 19.7% | 5.2% | 5.4% | 9.1% | 18.4% |
| Election Results | 13 April 2014 | 869,137 | 51.7% | 37.5% | 2.2% | 1.8% | | |

=== Parliament ===
| Poll source | Date | Sample size | VMRO-DPMNE | SDSM | DUI | DPA | NDR | GROM |
|---|---|---|---|---|---|---|---|---|
| Dimitrija Čupovski | January 2014 | 1,530 | 59 | 36 | 15 | 7 | 1 | 2 |
| Dimitrija Čupovski | April 2014 | 1,500 | 63 | 31 | 15 | 10 | 1 | – |

== Conduct ==
The second round of the election had accreditations given to 9,952 domestic and 550 foreign observers, as well as 283 translators, according to the State Election Commission.

The United States and European Union publicly urged political leaders to ensure the election was "credible and transparent," amidst complains by the SDSM.

== Results ==
=== President ===
In second round voting, centres were open from 5:00 GMT to 17:00 GMT. Turnout was reported as 9.58% in the first three hours. Gjorge Ivanov was re-elected with 57% of the valid vote. Following the election, Stevo Pendarovski called for an investigation of the election by external observers.

| Candidate | Party | First round | | Second round | |
| Candidate | Party | Votes | % | Votes | % |
|---|---|---|---|---|---|
| Gjorge Ivanov | VMRO-DPMNE | 449,442 | 53.13 | 534,910 | 57.33 |
| Stevo Pendarovski | Social Democratic Union | 326,164 | 38.56 | 398,077 | 42.67 |
| Ilijaz Halimi | Democratic Party of Albanians | 38,966 | 4.61 | | |
| Zoran T. Popovski | Citizen Option for Macedonia | 31,368 | 3.71 | | |
| Total | | 845,940 | 100.00 | 932,987 | 100.00 |
| Valid votes | | 845,940 | 97.28 | 932,987 | 96.41 |
| Invalid/blank votes | | 23,677 | 2.72 | 34,707 | 3.59 |
| Total votes | | 869,617 | 100.00 | 967,694 | 100.00 |
| Registered voters/turnout | | 1,779,572 | 48.87 | 1,779,572 | 54.38 |
Source: SEC, SEC

=== Parliament ===
The incumbent government, led by VMRO-DPMNE, received 44% of the vote to claim victory ahead of SDSM with 26% and DUI with 14%. The 123 seats in the Assembly were won by six political parties and coalitions with the VMRO-DPMNE coalition winning 61 seats, the SDSM coalition winning 34 seats, DUI winning 19 seats, DPA winning 7 seats and GROM and NDP winning 1 seat each.

| Party | Votes | % | Seats | +/– |
|---|---|---|---|---|
| VMRO-DPMNE coalition | 481,615 | 44.47 | 61 | +5 |
| Social Democratic Union coalition | 283,955 | 26.22 | 34 | −8 |
| Democratic Union for Integration | 153,646 | 14.19 | 19 | +4 |
| Democratic Party of Albanians | 66,393 | 6.13 | 7 | −1 |
| Citizen Option for Macedonia coalition | 31,610 | 2.92 | 1 | New |
| National Democratic Revival | 17,783 | 1.64 | 1 | −1 |
| VMRO – People's Party | 16,772 | 1.55 | 0 | 0 |
| Coalition for a Positive Macedonia (Note: Alliance for a Positive Macedonia and Party of Pensioners) | 10,566 | 0.98 | 0 | New |
| Dignity for Macedonia Coalition (Note: Dignity–MORO–Labour Party) | 9,265 | 0.86 | 0 | New |
| Social Democratic Party | 4,700 | 0.43 | 0 | 0 |
| Party for a European Future | 3,194 | 0.29 | 0 | New |
| Popular Movement for Macedonia | 1,925 | 0.18 | 0 | New |
| Party for Economic Change 21 | 1,281 | 0.12 | 0 | New |
| Party for Democratic Prosperity | 385 | 0.04 | 0 | 0 |
| Total | 1,083,090 | 100.00 | 123 | 0 |
| Valid votes | 1,083,090 | 96.64 | | |
| Invalid/blank votes | 37,654 | 3.36 | | |
| Total votes | 1,120,744 | 100.00 | | |
| Registered voters/turnout | 1,780,128 | 62.96 | | |
Source: SEC

== Reactions ==
After voting ended the SDSM's Zoran Zaev said that "SDSM and our opposition coalition will not recognise the election process, neither the presidential nor the parliamentary." He accused the government of "abusing the entire state system." It followed reports that Gruevski had warned that the SDSM was preparing, as an alibi, to react in such a manner to the election because they were due to lose the election.

== Notes ==
- ^{a} The term "general elections" is used to refer to the presidential and parliamentary elections that were, incidentally, held on the same date since the Republic of Macedonia has a parliamentary system in which both elections are held separately.
