= 2020 North Macedonian parliamentary election =

- 15 July 2020
- All 120 seats in the Assembly; 61 seats needed for a majority
- Turnout: 52.02% (▼14.77pp)
Party	Leader	Vote %	Seats	+/–
We Can!	Zoran Zaev	35.89	46	−8
Renewal for Macedonia	Hristijan Mickoski	34.57	44	−7
BDI	Ali Ahmeti	11.48	15	+5
ASh–Alternativa	Ziadin Sela	8.95	12	+9
Levica	Dimitar Apasiev	4.10	2	+2
PDSh	Menduh Thaçi	1.53	1	−1
This lists parties that won seats. See the complete results below.
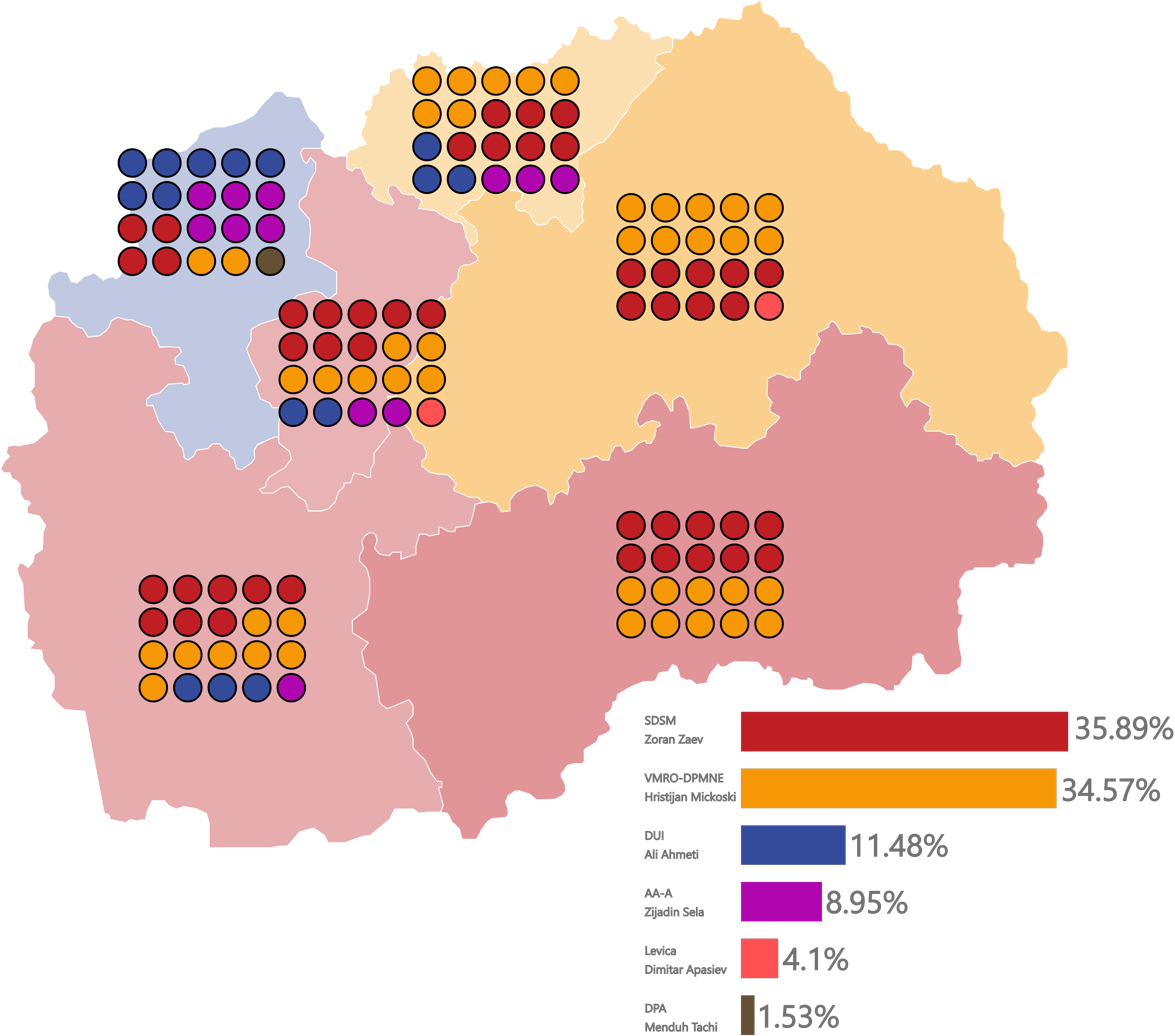
Results by constituency
Prime Minister before	Prime Minister after
Oliver Spasovski; SDSM	Zoran Zaev; SDSM

Early parliamentary elections were held in North Macedonia on 15 July 2020. It was originally scheduled for November 2020, but Prime Minister Zoran Zaev called early elections after the European Council failed to come to an agreement on starting talks with North Macedonia on joining the European Union in October 2019. The election date was set for 12 April, but was postponed until July due to the COVID-19 pandemic in North Macedonia.

== Background ==
On 17 October 2019 the European Council did not give North Macedonia and Albania a date to start European Union membership negotiations, after it was opposed by French President Emmanuel Macron. The rejection was seen as a blow to Prime Minister Zoran Zaev's government in North Macedonia. Previously, in February 2019 the country formally changed its name from Macedonia to North Macedonia to resolve a longstanding dispute with Greece that blocked it from joining the European Union and NATO, after high level talks between Prime Minister Zaev and his Greek counterpart Alexis Tsipras throughout 2018 led to the Prespa Agreement signed on 17 June 2018. In May 2019 the candidate from Zaev's SDSM party, Stevo Pendarovski, won in the presidential election in a run off vote.

In response to the European Council's decision, it was announced by Zaev that early parliamentary elections would be held on 12 April 2020. The date was chosen because it was expected North Macedonia would be a full member of NATO by then. On 27 March 2020, North Macedonia officially joined NATO.

== Electoral system ==
North Macedonia's six constituencies

Of the 123 seats in the Assembly of the Republic, 120 are elected from six 20-seat constituencies in North Macedonia using closed list proportional representation, with seats allocated using the d'Hondt method. The remaining three seats are elected by Macedonians living abroad, but are only filled if the number of votes exceeds that of the elected candidate with the fewest votes in North Macedonia in the previous election. If a list crosses this threshold, it wins one seat; to win two seats, a list needs to win twice the number of votes, and to win three seats the threshold is three times the number of votes. These seats were not filled in the 2016 elections due to insufficient turnout.

== Campaign ==
Both Zaev's Social Democratic Union of Macedonia (SDSM) and the right-wing opposition VMRO-DPMNE, which opposes parts of the Prespa Agreement—notably the name change to North Macedonia—began campaigning by early October 2019 as it seemed there would be a snap election. The SDSM campaign emphasised the party's role in the country's Euro-Atlantic integration, including resolving the dispute with Greece and securing NATO membership. The VMRO-DPMNE campaign opposes the name change and accused the government of corruption.

=== We Can ===
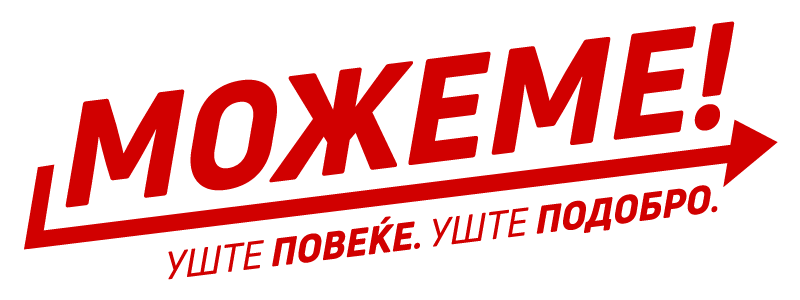
"We Can" Macedonia electoral alliance

The SDSM-led "We Can" coalition also included the Besa Movement, the VMRO – People's Party, the Democratic Party of Turks, the New Social Democratic Party (NSDP), the Liberal Democratic Party (LDP), the Party for a European Future (PEI), the United Party for Roma Equality (OPER), the Party for the Movement of Turks in Macedonia (PDT), the Democratic Union of the Vlachs of Macedonia (DSVM), New Alternative (NA), the Party for Economic Changes 21 (PEP 21), the Party for Social and Economic Progress (POEN), the Democratic Union (DS), the Political Party “Dignity” (PPD), the Serbian Party in Macedonia (SSM), the Democratic League of Bosniaks, the Party of Pensioners (PP), the Party for Democratic Prosperity of the Roma (PDPR), Democratic Renewal of Macedonia (DOM), United for Macedonia (OM), the Party for the Full Emancipation of the Roma of Macedonia (CERRNM), and the Union of Roma in Macedonia. SDSM-led coalition received endorsements from Jean Asselborn, the Foreign Minister of Luxembourg, as well as Michael Roth, who serves as German Deputy Minister for Europe, Pedro Sánchez (the Prime Minister of Spain), and Alexis Tsipras (the former Prime Minister of Greece). The ALDE Party endorsed the Liberal Democratic Party, and the European Green Party endorsed Democratic Renewal of Macedonia, both of which are participating in the coalition.

=== Renewal ===
The VMRO-DPMNE-led "Renewal for Macedonia" coalition also included Citizen Option for Macedonia (GROM), the Movement for Turkish National Union, the Democratic Party of Serbs in Macedonia, the Democratic Party of the Roma, the Democratic Forces of the Roma, Macedonian Action (MAAK), the New Liberal Party, the Party of the Vlachs of Macedonia (PVM), the Party of United Democrats of Macedonia, the United Party of the Roma in Macedonia, the Workers’ Agricultural Party of Macedonia, the Socialist Party of Macedonia, the Serbian Progressive Party, the Party of Democratic Action of Macedonia, the Union of Tito’s Left Forces, Roma Integration Party, and Democratic Bosniak Party, as well as the independent candidates Adnan Arsovski and Adnan Kahil. Hungarian Prime Minister Viktor Orbán has endorsed VMRO-DPMNE-led coalition.

=== Albanian parties ===
The Democratic Union for Integration (DUI), which is the largest Albanian party in North Macedonia and has been part of most government coalitions since the 2002 elections, announced its candidacy early on. It campaigned under the stated goal of electing an ethnic Albanian Prime Minister of North Macedonia for the first time. Its candidate for Prime Minister was Naser Ziberi, former Minister of Labour within SDSM-led government of North Macedonia.

On 19 February, the Alliance for Albanians (ASh) and Alternativa announced their own electoral coalition (ASA). ASA stands in opposition to DUI and is headed by Ziadin Sela, former mayor of Struga.

On 27 February, SDSM and the BESA Movement, a social-democratic Albanian party announced that they would run together, this was the first time a Macedonian and an Albanian party agreed to form a pre-election coalition.

The Democratic Party of Albanians (DPA/PDSh) is the smallest Albanian ethnic party in terms of electoral power that participated in the elections. Its president and electoral list carrier is Menduh Thaçi.

== Conduct ==
Special provisions were made for 700 people who contracted COVID-19 or were in quarantine. Measures were taken to ensure that the elderly and prison inmates vote early to avoid potential exposure to the virus. The head of the election commission, Oliver Derkoski, commented that the voting day passed calmly and only sporadic instances of irregularities were reported. Local electoral observation missions also expressed satisfaction at the conduct of the polls. Ljupco Nikolovski, the secretary-general of SDSM, commended the polls, saying "Today we had a calm, dignifying, and from health perspective, a safe day." A local observation mission criticized the lack of adequate mechanism for the disabled to vote.

However, the opposition Alliance for Albanians and Alternativa movements, both upholding the interests of the ethnic Albanian minority, accused the BDI (another Albanian minority party) and SDSM of committing fraud to win. North Macedonia's public prosecution also received multiple complaints on election day.

VMRO-DPMNE vice president Vladimir Misajlovski said that the results of the elections did not reflect the reality on ground. He blamed bribery of voters and abuse of institutions by the SDSM party to secure re-election.

When vote counting began, the electoral commission's website was down for one hour. Derkoski said that it was probably due to external hacker attacks, but did not hamper actual vote counting. The unofficial results page also went down several times on and following election night.

International observers described the elections as "well-managed". OSCE said that the elections were generally well-run and candidates could campaign freely, but legal stability was undermined by significant changes to electoral framework. They said that the authorities need to address the issues before next elections. According to OSCE, election day went smoothly, but challenges with voter registration remained. Media coverage also lacked critical assessment of party platforms.

== Opinion polls ==
View source data.

Opinion polling for the 2020 North Macedonian parliamentary election
Pollster	Date	VMRO-DPMNE	LDP	SDSM	Besa	DUI	AA	Alternativa	DPA	Levica	Integra	Other	Lead	Abstention
2020 result	15 July 2020	34.6	35.9			11.5	9.0		1.5	4.1	1.4	2.1	1.3	—
M-Prospect	16–21 June	36.6	39.3			10.7	8.4	—	1.3	0.8	1.7	1.2	2.7	—
NDI, TEAM, STARR	12–21 June	32.6	38.2			11.1	8.8	—	—	—	—	9.3	5.6	—
Market Vision	13–18 June	32.5	4.1	30.2	0.8	13.7	7.7	1.7	0.4	4.9	1.7	2.8	2.3	—
Kantar TNS Brima	5–14 June	27.8	—	34.4	4.8	15.1	9.0	—	1.1	2.2	2.4	3.2	6.6	—
IPIS	2–5 June	40.3	36.4			10.8	7.7	—	1.7	2.4	—	0.7	3.9	—
STRATUM R&D	1–7 June	35.9	39.1			10.9	7.8	—	1.6	3.1	—	1.6	3.2	—
IFES	30 May–4 June	32.1	—	40.1		11.8	12.4	—	0.6	1.2	—	—	8.0	—
2020
MCMS, Societas Civilis	15 Nov–1 Dec	20.4	—	22.1	1.5	6.6	2.6	0.8	0.9	1.7	—	2	1.7	41.4
Market Vision	17–24 Sep	39.8	—	31.2	1.2	9.6	6.8	—	0.6	0.9	—	9.9	8.6	22.5
IPIS	14–17 Sep	42.6	—	36.6	1.4	9.1	5.7	1.6	—	—	—	3.0	6.0	—
Tim Institut	10–20 Jul	21.1	—	24.4	0.9	5.6	1.8	2	0.2	0.2	—	1.1	3.3	42.7
2019
MCMS	7–11 Dec	21.6	—	26.9	2.5	7.4	3.1	—	—	—	—	2.8	5.3	35.7
Telma, MCMS	7–15 Nov	21.5	—	26.8	2.4	6.7	3	—	0.3	—	—	2.6	5.3	36.7
Telma, MCMS	15–23 May	20.6	—	25.5	2	7.4	2.9	—	—	1.7	—	1.9	4.9	38
2018
Telma, MCMS	4–11 Sep	20.9	—	24.3	3.1	8.9	2.7	—	0.6	—	—	1.6	3.4	37.9
2017
2017 Skopje election	15 Oct	34.55	0.30	43.74	4.95	6.10	2.49	—	0.51	2.11	—N/a	0.50 (Note: TMRO)	9.2	—
2016 election	11 December 2016	39.4	37.9		5.0	7.5	3.0	—	2.7	1.1	—	3.4	1.5	(33.2)

== Results ==
The election resulted in an extremely divided parliament, with the pro-EU SDSM-led coalition winning a plurality of votes and seats. The nationalist conservative VMRO-DPMNE-led coalition came as a close second, lagging behind by only two seats and less than 1.5% of the vote. The BDI and the Alliance for Albanians–Alternativa coalition, both representing the ethnic Albanian minority, saw large gains. The Left, a socialist party, entered parliament for the first time with two seats, and the Democratic Party of Albanians lost one seat. Turnout was down roughly 15 percentage points mainly due to the COVID-19 pandemic.

Party	Votes	%	Seats	+/–
We Can! More and Better (Note: Composed of Social Democratic Union of Macedonia (SDSM), Besa Movement (BESA), VMRO – People's Party (VMRO–NP), the Democratic Party of Turks (TDP), New Social Democratic Party (NSDP), Liberal Democratic Party (LDP), Party for a European Future (PEI), United Party for Roma Equality (OPER), Party for the Movement of Turks in Macedonia (PDT), Democratic Union of the Vlachs of Macedonia (DSVM), New Alternative (NA), Party for Economic Changes 21 (PEP 21), Party for Social and Economic Progress (POEN), Democratic Union (DS), Political Party “Dignity” (PPD), Serbian Party in Macedonia (SSM), Democratic League of Bosniaks, Party of Pensioners (PP), Party for Democratic Prosperity of the Roma (PDPR), Democratic Renewal of Macedonia (DOM), United for Macedonia (OM), Party for the Full Emancipation of the Roma of Macedonia (CERRNM), and Union of Roma in Macedonia (SRM).)	327,408	35.89	46	–8
Renewal for Macedonia (Note: Composed of VMRO-DPMNE, Citizen Option for Macedonia (GROM), Movement for the National Unity of the Turkish (DNET), Democratic Party of Serbs in Macedonia (DPSM), Democratic Party of the Roma (DPR), Democratic Forces of the Roma (DSR), Macedonian Action (MAAK), New Liberal Party (NLP), Party of the Vlachs of Macedonia (PVM), Party of United Democrats of Macedonia (PODEM), United Party of the Roma in Macedonia, Workers’ Agricultural Party of Macedonia (RZPRM), Socialist Party of Macedonia (SPM), Serbian Progressive Party in Macedonia (SNSM), Party of Democratic Action of Macedonia (SDAM), Union of Tito’s Left Forces (STLS), Roma Integration Party (PIR) and Democratic Bosniak Party (DBP), as well as the independent candidates Adnan Arsovski and Adnan Kahil)	315,344	34.57	44	–7
Democratic Union for Integration	104,699	11.48	15	+5
Alliance for Albanians–Alternativa	81,620	8.95	12	+9
The Left	37,426	4.10	2	+2
Democratic Party of Albanians	13,930	1.53	1	–1
Integra – Macedonian Conservative Party	12,291	1.35	0	New
Civic Democratic Union	3,555	0.39	0	New
MORO–Labour Party	3,245	0.36	0	0
Voice for Macedonia	2,802	0.31	0	New
Never North, Only Macedonia (Note: Composed of United Macedonia (EM) and Front for a Democratic Macedonia (FroDeM).)	2,604	0.29	0	0
Social Democratic Union	2,585	0.28	0	0
Your Party	1,894	0.21	0	New
Democrats	1,558	0.17	0	New
Roma People's Party	1,225	0.13	0	New
Total	912,186	100.00	120	0
Valid votes	912,186	96.66		
Invalid/blank votes	31,564	3.34		
Total votes	943,750	100.00		
Registered voters/turnout	1,814,263	52.02		
Source: State Election Commission

== Aftermath ==
A coalition government was required as neither of the two largest parties hold enough seats to form a majority on their own, and mathematically, any coalition will have to include at least one of the two largest Albanian minority parties. The BDI made its participation in any coalition contingent on the nominee for Prime Minister being an ethnic Albanian, which both the SDSM and VMRO-DPMNE have refused. The BDI also had increased tensions with both the SDSM and the Alliance for Albanians coalition prior to and during the election, accusing the former of splitting the Albanian vote by allying with the Besa Movement, and being accused by the latter of committing fraud.

On 18 August the SDSM and BDI announced that they had reached a deal on a coalition government as well as a compromise on the issue of an ethnic Albanian Prime Minister. Under the deal, SDSM leader Zoran Zaev will be installed as Prime Minister, and will serve in that position until no later than 100 days from the next parliamentary elections (Rotation government). At that time, the BDI will propose an ethnic Albanian candidate for Prime Minister, and if both parties agree on the candidate, that candidate will serve out the remaining term until the elections. On 30 August, a coalition of the SDSM-aligned parties, BDI, and the Democratic Party of Albanians was approved by the parliament in a 62–51 vote.

== See also ==
- List of members of the Assembly of North Macedonia, 2020–2024
