= 2011 Macedonian parliamentary election =

- 5 June 2011
- All 123 seats in the Assembly; 62 seats needed for a majority
| Party | Leader | Vote % | Seats | +/– |
|---|---|---|---|---|
| VMRO-DPMNE coalition | Nikola Gruevski | 38.98 | 56 | −7 |
| SDSM coalition | Branko Crvenkovski | 32.78 | 42 | +15 |
| BDI | Ali Ahmeti | 10.24 | 15 | −3 |
| PDSh | Menduh Thaçi | 5.90 | 8 | −3 |
| RDK | Rufi Osmani | 2.67 | 2 | New |
This lists parties that won seats. See the complete results below.
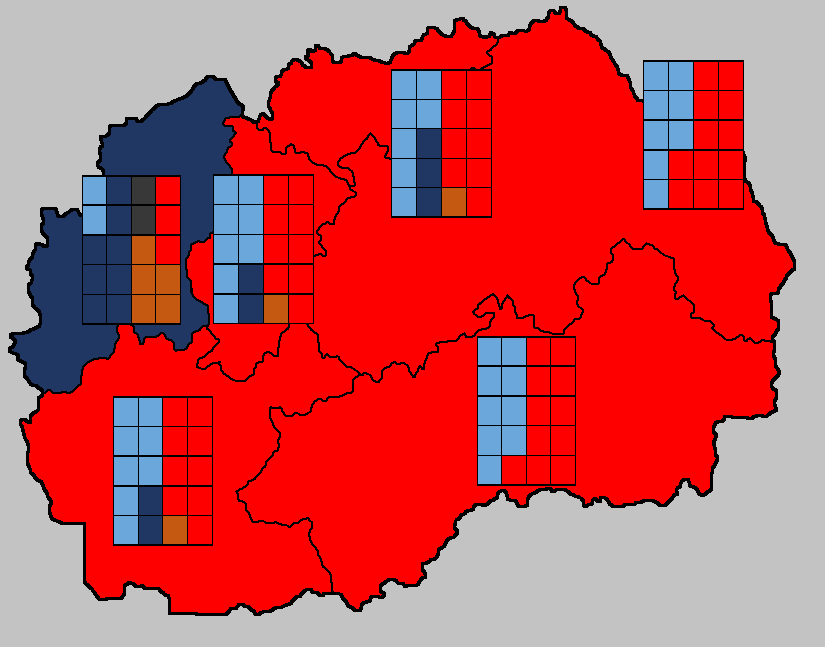
Results by constituency
| Prime Minister before | Prime Minister after |
|---|---|
| Nikola Gruevski; VMRO-DPMNE | Nikola Gruevski; VMRO-DPMNE |

Early parliamentary elections were held in the Republic of Macedonia on 5 June 2011, a year earlier than necessary. All 123 parliamentary seats of the Sobranie were due for election, including the 3 seats provided for the first time for representatives of the Macedonian citizens living abroad: 1 from Europe, 1 from North America, and 1 from Asia and Australia. The decision of the ruling parties, the Christian Democratic VMRO-DPMNE and the ethnic Albanian Democratic Union for Integration (DUI), to dissolve the Parliament and call for an early election was preceded by protests of the Social Democratic Union (SDSM), the major opposition party, and subsequent boycott of the Parliament by them, and by other smaller opposition parties.

== Background ==
Parliamentary elections were due in mid-2012, after the ruling coalition of VMRO-DPMNE and DUI won over two-thirds of the seats in the 2008 elections. However, a bitter dispute between the ruling coalition and the opposition was triggered when a police-assisted raid of public revenue officers took place on 25 November 2010, on a group of related companies including a private TV station, three daily newspapers, and other companies, for alleged tax evasion offenses. The opposition claimed that the media were raided due to their anti-government inclination. The opposing SDSM organised a huge rally on 5 December 2010, in which, according to estimates of the organisers, some 50,000 marched on the main streets of the capital Skopje and in front of the Parliament building, demanding that charges against the companies and the managers be dropped, and early election. However, the investigation continued, and on 24 December 2010 16 people were charged and detained for suspected tax evasion, abuse of office and money laundering, including the owner of the TV station and several executives.

On 28 January 2011 the opposition SDSM decided to walk out of the Parliament in protest, citing lack of democratic capacity of the government, and demanding early election. The move was followed by the smaller opposition parties in the Parliament – New Social Democratic Party (NSDP), New Democracy (ND) and the Liberal Party (LP). The Democratic Party of Albanians (DPA) supported the decision, but they were already boycotting the Parliament since 2009.

The ruling coalition initially rejected this request for early election by the opposition, citing strong public support according to the polls, and solid parliamentary majority as main reasons against the opposition's demands. But after a one-month standoff, during which the opposition SDSM lobbied the EU & US officials, foreign diplomats, and failed to participate in consensus-building on any major political issues, the Prime Minister accepted the request and announced on 23 February 2011 that early elections will eventually take place.

After the failed attempts of the major parties to reach consensus on the changes of the electoral law and other demands of the opposition during March, the Parliament was dissolved on 14 April 2011, and the election was called the next day, with the election date set for 5 June 2011.

== Electoral system ==
- 120 Members of Parliament are elected in six electoral districts, yielding 20 MPs each by party-list proportional representation, using the D'Hondt method, with no election threshold.
- 3 Members of Parliament are elected in three electoral districts, one in each of: Europe-Africa, North & South America and Asia-Australia by party-list proportional representation. Macedonian citizens living in emigration in the respective geographic areas can vote in the Macedonian diplomatic offices. These three seats for representatives of the emigration were added to the electoral law in 2011, just before the dissolution of the Parliament.

Important dates:

- The registered voters list must be checked and closed by the State Election Commission until 4 May.
- Independent candidates are allowed to participate, and have to collect 1,000 supporters' signatures between 25 April and 4 May.
- Participating parties, coalitions and independents must submit their candidate lists to the State Election Commission until 5 May.
- Election campaigns commence on 16 May and end on 3 June.
- Voting will take place on 5 June, while expatriates, disabled, military and prisoners vote one day earlier.
- The parliament must be constituted between 10 and 25 June.

After the official results are published, the President delegates the task of forming a government to the leader of the party or coalition which won most seats in the Parliament. That member has up to 35 days to negotiate with the different parties, and then present his or her government to the Parliament for a vote of confidence. The leader becomes Prime Minister once the government is approved (by a vote of simple majority).

== Campaign ==
The parties, coalitions and independent candidates were required to submit candidate lists by 5 May 2011. Separate lists were submitted for each or any electoral districts.

18 parties and coalitions submitted their candidate lists with 1,679 candidates in total. The two major parties both formed large coalitions.

=== VMRO-DPMNE ===
The VMRO-DPMNE-led coalition included 22 parties; VMRO-DPMNE, the Socialist Party of Macedonia, the Democratic Union, Democratic Renewal of Macedonia, the Democratic Party of Turks, the Democratic Party of Serbs in Macedonia, the Union of Roma in Macedonia, the United Party for Emancipation, the Party of Justice, the Party of the Democratic Action of Macedonia, the Party of the Vlachs of Macedonia, the Party for Integration of the Roma, the Bosniak Democratic Party, Democratic Forces of the Roma, Permanent Macedonian Radical Unification, the New Liberal Party, the People's Movement for Macedonia, VMRO–Democratic Party, VMRO-United, Fatherland's Macedonian Organisation for Radical Renewal–Vardar–Aegean–Pirin TMORO–VEP, Macedonian Alliance and VMRO– Macedonian

=== SDSM ===
The SDSM-led coalition consisted of 15 parties; the Social Democratic Union of Macedonia, the New Social Democratic Party, the Party for a European Future, the Liberal Party of Macedonia, the Party for the Movement of the Turks in Macedonia, the Serbian Progressive Party in Macedonia, the Party for the Full Emancipation of the Roma of Macedonia, the New Alternative, the Union of Tito's Left Forces, the Movement for National Unity of Turks in Macedonia, the Democratic Union of Serbs in Macedonia, the Democratic Union of the Vlachs of Macedonia, the Party of Free Democrats, the Party of Pensioners of Macedonia and the Sandžak League.

=== New parties ===
- National Democratic Revival (Albanian: Rilindja Demokratike Kombëtare) is an ethnic Albanian party formed in March 2011 and led by Rufi Osmani, mayor of Gostivar and a political activist since the 1990s.
- Dignity (Macedonian: Достоинство) is a new political party led by the former police general Stojance Angelov, formed in March 2011 by the members of the former homonymic NGO, uniting ethnic Macedonian veterans from the conflict of 2001.

== Opinion polls ==
| Source | Date | Party | | | | | | | | | |
| Source | Date | VMRO-DPMNE | SDSM | DUI | DPA | ND | OM | NDA | LDP | VMRO-NP | Others |
|---|---|---|---|---|---|---|---|---|---|---|---|
| Dnevnik/Rating^{‡} | 15 Apr | 51 | 32 | 14 | 7 | 4 | 3 | 3 | 2 | − | 4 |
| AlfaTV/Pavel Šatev^{‡} | 15 Apr | 55 | 31 | 15 | 7 | 4 | 3 | 3 | 2 | − | 4 |
| Kanal5/Pavel Šatev^{‡} | 17 Apr | 55 | 31 | 15 | 7 | 4 | 1 | 3 | 2 | 1 | 1 |
| ISPPI^{♦‡} | 18 Apr | 21.8% | 19.8% | 8.8% | 5.9% | 1.9% | 1.1% | 4.5% | − | 1.2% | − |
| NetPress/Progress^{♦‡} | 26 Apr | 19.1% | 20.3% | 8.2% | 5.4% | 2.2% | 1.4% | 3.1% | 0.2% | 1.8% | 37.5% |
| Dnevnik/Rating^{‡} | 26 May | 48 | 35 | 13 | 8 | 4 | 3 | 3 | 2 | 4 | – |

‡ The poll does not include the 3 seats from the diaspora.
♦ The poll does not represent number of parliamentary seats, only percentages of voters.

== Result ==
Voter turnout was 63,48%. 7,851 accredited observers monitored the election, including representatives from the Organization for Security and Co-operation in Europe, ODIHR, and others. The election went smoothly and without incidents.

Only 5 parties and coalitions, out of the 18 listed on the ballots, managed to win parliamentary seats. Several parties that were represented in the previous parliaments didn't win any seats, including VMRO-NP, LDP, and others.

The official final results are presented below. The main opposition coalition led by SDSM conceded the defeat and congratulated the winning coalition led by VMRO-DPMNE.

| Party | Votes | % | Seats | +/– |
|---|---|---|---|---|
| VMRO-DPMNE coalition | 438,138 | 38.98 | 56 | –7 |
| SDSM coalition | 368,496 | 32.78 | 42 | +18 |
| Democratic Union for Integration | 115,092 | 10.24 | 15 | –3 |
| Democratic Party of Albanians | 66,315 | 5.90 | 8 | –3 |
| National Democratic Revival | 29,996 | 2.67 | 2 | New |
| VMRO – People's Party | 28,217 | 2.51 | 0 | New |
| New Democracy | 19,958 | 1.78 | 0 | –4 |
| United for Macedonia | 17,081 | 1.52 | 0 | New |
| Liberal Democratic Party | 16,551 | 1.47 | 0 | –4 |
| Dignity | 8,837 | 0.79 | 0 | New |
| Democratic Union of Albanians | 4,517 | 0.40 | 0 | 0 |
| Party of United Democrats of Macedonia | 4,395 | 0.39 | 0 | New |
| Social Democratic Union | 2,270 | 0.20 | 0 | New |
| Social Democratic Party of Macedonia | 1,807 | 0.16 | 0 | 0 |
| Democratic Right | 1,517 | 0.13 | 0 | New |
| National Democratic Union | 470 | 0.04 | 0 | 0 |
| Party for Democratic Prosperity | 277 | 0.02 | 0 | 0 |
| European Party of Macedonia | 130 | 0.01 | 0 | New |
| Total | 1,124,064 | 100.00 | 123 | +3 |
| Valid votes | 1,124,064 | 97.23 | | |
| Invalid/blank votes | 31,985 | 2.77 | | |
| Total votes | 1,156,049 | 100.00 | | |
| Registered voters/turnout | 1,821,122 | 63.48 | | |
Source: State Election Commission

== Reactions and aftermath ==
In his election victory speech Gruevski said that in the next term the government "will work on attracting investments and creating jobs, on EU and NATO membership with our dignity intact, the fight against corruption, maintaining good multi-ethnic relations and supporting education, which is key to the future".

In a joint statement, EU High Representative for Foreign Affairs and Security Policy Catherine Ashton and Commissioner for Enlargement and European Neighbourhood Policy Štefan Füle hailed the multiparty, transparent and well organized elections.

EU Commission president José Manuel Barroso sent a message of congratulations to Gruevski on the election victory.

On 6 June, a day after the election, Ljube Boškoski, the leader of the United for Macedonia was arrested on suspicion of illegal party financing and abuse of office. Allegedly, he received 130.000 Euro in illegal funding for his party's campaign.

Most of the smaller parties did not win any seats in the parliament. Of the 18 parties and coalitions listed on the ballot, only 5 won any seats. The leaders of several of the parties that did not win any seats, including the Social Democratic Union, New Democracy, Democratic Right and the Liberal Democrats, resigned in the days after the election due to the poor results.
