= 2008 Macedonian parliamentary election =

- 1 June 2008
- All 120 seats in the Assembly; 61 seats needed for a majority
Party	Leader	Vote %	Seats
For a Better Macedonia	Nikola Gruevski	48.78	63
Coalition for Europe	Radmila Šekerinska	23.64	27
BDI	Ali Ahmeti	12.82	18
PDSh	Menduh Thaçi	8.26	11
European Future	Fijat Canoski	1.47	1
This lists parties that won seats. See the complete results below.
Prime Minister before	Prime Minister after election
Nikola Gruevski; VMRO-DPMNE	Nikola Gruevski; VMRO-DPMNE

Early parliamentary elections were held in Macedonia on 1 June 2008, after the Assembly voted to dissolve itself on 12 April 2008. The result was a victory for the VMRO-DPMNE-led alliance, which won 63 of the 120 seats in the Assembly.

== Background ==
The early elections were proposed by the Democratic Union for Integration (DUI) after Greece vetoed Macedonia's bid to join NATO at the 2008 Bucharest summit over the Macedonia naming dispute. The DUI's request was supported by the ruling coalition of VMRO–DPMNE and the Democratic Party of Albanians. Although the opposition Social Democratic Union and Liberal Democratic Party boycotted the vote, 70 of the 120 MPs voted in favour of the motion, with all others absent from the vote.

Elections had not been due until 2010, and these were the first early elections since independence in 1991.

== Campaign ==
The two major parties formed coalitions before the elections. VMRO-DPMNE formed a coalition called "For a Better Macedonia", whilst the SDSM formed the eight-party "Sun – Coalition for Europe" alliance.

=== For a Better Macedonia ===
The For a Better Macedonia coalition included VMRO-DPMNE, the Socialist Party of Macedonia, the Democratic Union, Democratic Renewal of Macedonia, the Democratic Party of Turks, the Democratic Party of Serbs, the Union of Roma in Macedonia, VMRO-Macedonia, the United Party for Emancipation, the Party of Justice, the Party of Democratic Action of Macedonia, the Party of the Vlachs of Macedonia, the Party for Roma Integration, the People's Movement of Macedonia, the Democratic Party of the Bosniaks, the Party of the Greens, the Democratic Union of the Roma, the Workers' Agricultural Party of the Republic of Macedonia, and the Party for the Full Emancipation of the Roma of Macedonia.

=== Sun – Coalition for Europe ===
Sun – Coalition for Europe included the SDSM, the New Social Democratic Party, the Liberal Democratic Party, the Liberal Party of Macedonia, the New Alternative, the Green Party of Macedonia, the Party of Pensioners of the Republic of Macedonia and the Democratic Union of the Vlachs of Macedonia.

== Opinion polls ==
According to a poll of 1,108 citizens taken between 11 April and 15 April 2008, VMRO-DPMNE had a 29% rating, followed by SDSM with 11% and DUI with 10%. A poll from 24 April and 25 April 2008 gave VMRO-DPMNE 26%, SDSM 12%, DUI 11% and DPA 7%.

Other polls saw For a Better Macedonia lead with 37% to Sun's 18%, followed by DUI with 11% and DPA with 6%.

== Conduct ==
The tense elections involved episodes of violence, mostly between rival ethnic Albanian parties, the DUI and DPA. Shootings were reported in the Albanian-populated North-West of the country. A gunman opened fire on a Macedonian police unit patrolling the village of Aračinovo, north of the capital Skopje. One person was killed and several were wounded.

The situation appeared to have calmed down by the time polls closed at 7 p.m. (1700 GMT).

There were also reports of ballot stuffing and allegations of fraud in villages around Skopje during the early hours of voting.

Due to violence on the polling day, polling had to be repeated in parts of three election districts (193 polling stations out of 2,976) on 15 June 2008; about 170,000 voters were eligible to vote in the rerun, and the results determined which of the two main Albanian parties will join VMRO–DPMNE in government.

== Results ==
Party	Votes	%	Seats
For a Better Macedonia	481,501	48.78	63
Sun – Coalition for Europe	233,284	23.64	27
Democratic Union for Integration	126,522	12.82	18
Democratic Party of Albanians	81,557	8.26	11
Party for a European Future	14,474	1.47	1
Party for Democratic Prosperity	7,213	0.73	0
Democratic Union of Albanians	6,484	0.66	0
Social Democratic Party of Macedonia	6,406	0.65	0
Party of Free Democrats	4,362	0.44	0
Radical Party of the Serbs in Macedonia	4,326	0.44	0
TMORO–VEP	4,317	0.44	0
Movement for National Unity of Turks	3,782	0.38	0
Union of Tito's Left Forces	3,758	0.38	0
Group of Electors Panco Minov	2,744	0.28	0
VMRO – Democratic Party	2,335	0.24	0
Permanent Macedonian Radical Unification	1,856	0.19	0
National Democratic Union	1,651	0.17	0
Peco Grujovski Group of Electors	449	0.05	0
Total	987,021	100.00	120
Valid votes	987,021	97.22	
Invalid/blank votes	28,173	2.78	
Total votes	1,015,194	100.00	
Registered voters/turnout	1,779,116	57.06	
Source: State Election Commission, SE Times, IHT

== Aftermath ==
The Party for Democratic Prosperity announced after the election on 3 June 2008 that it would merge with the DPA, effectively making the DPA the larger of the two main Albanian parties and increasing its chances in the repeated elections.
