= For a European Future =

Political alliance in North Macedonia

For a European Future За европска иднина Për të ardhme evropiane
- Leader: Venko Filipče
- Ideology: Social democracy Pro-Europeanism; Factions: Social liberalism Christian democracy Green liberalism Pensioner's interests Romani minority interests Serb minority interests Croat minority interests Turkish minority interests Aromanian minority interests
- Political position: Centre-left
- Colors: Red; Yellow; Blue
- Slogan: Нема откажување од иднината! ('There is no giving up on the future!')
- Assembly: 18 / 120
- Mayors: 16 / 80
- Local councils: 423 / 1,333
- Skopje City Council: 12 / 45

Election symbol

For a European Future (Macedonian: За европска иднина, romanized: Za evropska idnina, Albanian: Për të ardhme evropiane) is the current name of the political alliance in North Macedonia led by the Social Democratic Union of Macedonia (SDSM).

== History ==
The SDSM has contested most parliamentary elections since 1994 as part of a coalition led by the party. In the 1994 elections it formed the "Alliance for Macedonia" alongside the Liberal Party and Socialist Party. For the 2002 and 2006 parliamentary elections it formed Together for Macedonia. The 2008 elections were contested as Sun – Coalition for Europe.

For the 2016 parliamentary elections the alliance was named "For Life in Macedonia". For the 2020 elections it became "We Can! More and Better".

On 27 March 2024 SDSM and its partners established the "For a European Future" coalition. SDSM considered the coalition capable of ensuring the EU membership of North Macedonia. The coalition won 18 seats in the 2024 elections.

== Member parties ==
The member parties for the 2024 parliamentary elections were:

Party	Abbr.	Leader	Seats	Joined
Social Democratic Union of Macedonia; Социјалдемократски сојуз на Македонија; Lidhja socialdemokrate e Maqedonisë	SDSM	Dimitar Kovačevski (Note: Succeeded by Venko Filipče after the elections.)	15 / 120	1994
New Social Democratic Party; Нова социјалдемократска партија	NSDP	Goran Misovski	2 / 120	2008
Liberal Democratic Party; Либерално-демократска партија	LDP	Monika Zajkova	1 / 120	2002

Members without seats:

- VMRO – People's Party
- Party of Croats of Macedonia
- Party for the Movement of the Turks
- Democratic Union of the Vlachs
- Union of Roma
- Party of Democratic Action
- Democratic Renewal
- Right
- Party of Pensioners
- Party for the Democratic Prosperity of the Roma
- Party for Economic and Social Progress
- Serbian Party in Macedonia

== Former compositions ==
Election	Name	Members
1994	Alliance for Macedonia	SDSM, Liberal Party, Socialist Party
2002	Together for Macedonia	SDSM, Liberal Democratic Party, United Party of Roma, Democratic League of Bosniaks, Democratic Union of the Vlachs, Democratic Party of Serbs, Democratic Party of Turks, Workers' Agricultural Party, Socialist Christian Party, Green Party
2006	Together for Macedonia	SDSM, Liberal Democratic Party, United Party of Roma, Democratic Union of the Vlachs, Democratic Party of Serbs, Democratic Party of Turks, Workers' Agricultural Party, Socialist Christian Party, Green Party
2008	Sun – Coalition for Europe	SDSM, New Social Democratic Party, Liberal Democratic Party, Liberal Party, New Alternative, Green Party, Party of Pensioners, Democratic Union of the Vlachs
2011		SDSM, New Social Democratic Party, Party for a European Future, Liberal Party, Party for the Movement of the Turks, Serbian Progressive Party, Party for the Full Emancipation of the Roma, New Alternative, Union of Tito's Left Forces, Party for the Movement of the Turks, Democratic Union of Serbs, Democratic Union of the Vlachs, Party of Free Democrats, Party of Pensioners, Sandžak List
2014		SDSM, New Social Democratic Party, Liberal Democratic Party, United for Macedonia, Party for the Movement of the Turks, Party for the Full Emancipation of the Roma, Serbian Party in Macedonia, Democratic Union of the Vlachs, Sandžak League
2016	For Life in Macedonia	SDSM, New Social Democratic Party, Liberal Democratic Party, Party for the Movement of the Turks, New Alternative, Democratic Union of the Vlachs, Serbian Party in Macedonia, Party for Economic Reforms 21, Party of United Pensioners, Party for a European Future, Alliance for a Positive Macedonia, Democratic Renewal, Serbian Progressive Party, Party for the Full Emancipation of the Roma
2020	We Can! More and Better	SDSM, Besa Movement, VMRO – People's Party, Democratic Party of Turks, New Social Democratic Party, Liberal Democratic Party, Party for a European Future, United Party for Roma Equality, Party for the Movement of the Turks, Democratic Union of the Vlachs, New Alternative, Party for Economic Reforms 21, Party for Social and Economic Progress, Democratic Union, Dignity, Serbian Party in Macedonia, Democratic League of Bosniaks, Party of Pensioners, Party for Democratic Prosperity of the Roma, Democratic Renewal, United for Macedonia, Party for the Full Emancipation of the Roma, Union of Roma
