= Your Macedonia =

Political alliance in North Macedonia

Your Macedonia Твоја Македонија
- Leader: Hristijan Mickoski
- Founded: 1998
- Colors: Red; Black; Orange
- Assembly: 58 / 120

Election symbol
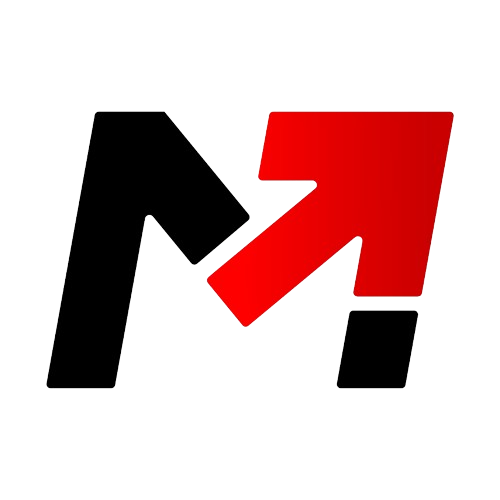

Your Macedonia (Macedonian: Твоја Македонија) is the current name of the political alliance in North Macedonia led by the VMRO-DPMNE (ВМРО–ДПМНЕ).

== History ==
VMRO-DPMNE has contested all parliamentary elections since 1998 as part of a coalition led by the party. In the 1998 elections it ran together with the Democratic Alternative and League for Democracy. It contested the 2002 elections with the Liberal Party.

The 2006, 2008 and 2016 parliamentary elections were contested as "For a Better Macedonia". For the 2020 elections it became "Renewal for Macedonia".

== Member parties ==
The member parties for the 2024 parliamentary elections were:

Party	Abbr.	Leader	Seats	Joined
Internal Macedonian Revolutionary Organization – Democratic Party for Macedonian National Unity; Внатрешна македонска револуционерна организација – Демократска партија за македонско национално единство	VMRO-DPMNE	Hristijan Mickoski	55 / 120	1998
Socialist Party of Macedonia; Социјалистичка партија на Македонија	SPM	Ljupco Dimovski	2 / 120	2006
Democratic Party of Serbs in Macedonia; Демократска странка Срба у Македонији; Демократска партија на Србите во Македонија	DPSM	Ivan Stoilković	1 / 120	2008

Members without seats:

- Bosniak People's Party
- Democratic Forces of the Roma
- Democratic Party of the Roma
- Democratic Union
- Dignity
- Macedonian Action
- Macedonian Concept
- Movement for National Unity of Turks in Macedonia
- New Liberal Party
- Party of the Vlachs of Macedonia
- Party of United Democrats of Macedonia
- Permanent Macedonian Radical Unification
- Serbian Progressive Party
- Social Democratic Union
- United for Macedonia
- United Party for Roma Equality
- United Party of Roma
- Voice for Macedonia
- Workers' Agricultural Party

== Former compositions ==
Election	Name	Members
1998		VMRO-DPMNE, Democratic Alternative, League for Democracy
2002		VMRO-DPMNE, Liberal Party
2006	For a Better Macedonia	VMRO-DPMNE, Liberal Party, Socialist Party, Democratic Union, Party for the Movement of the Turks, Union of Roma, Party of Democratic Action, Party of the Vlachs, European Party of Macedonia, Party of the Greens, People's Movement of Macedonia, Bosniak Democratic Party, Democratic Forces of the Roma, Party for the Integration of the Roma
2008	For a Better Macedonia	VMRO-DPMNE, Socialist Party of Macedonia, Democratic Union, Democratic Renewal, Democratic Party of Turks, Democratic Party of Serbs, Union of Roma, VMRO–Macedonia, United Party for Emancipation, Party for Justice, Party of Democratic Action, the Party of the Vlachs, Party for the Integration of the Roma, People's Movement of Macedonia, Bosniak Democratic Party, Party of the Greens, Democratic Union of the Roma, Workers' Agricultural Party, Party for the Full Emancipation of the Roma
2011		VMRO-DPMNE, Socialist Party, Democratic Union, Democratic Renewal, Democratic Party of Turks, Democratic Party of Serbs, Union of Roma, United Party for Emancipation, Party for Justice, Democratic Party of Action of Macedonia, Party of the Vlachs, Party for the Integration of the Roma, Bosniak Democratic Party, Democratic Forces of the Roma, Permanent Macedonian Radical Unification, New Liberal Party, People's Movement of Macedonia, VMRO – Democratic Party, VMRO-United, Homeland Macedonian Organisation for Radical Renewal – Vardar–Aegean–Pirin, Macedonian Alliance, VMRO–Macedonia
2014		VMRO-DPMNE, Socialist Party, Democratic Union, Democratic Renewal, Democratic Party of Turks, Democratic Party of Serbs, Union of Roma, United Party for Emancipation, Party for Justice, Party of Democratic Action, Party of the Vlachs, Party for the Integration of the Roma, Bosniak Democratic Party, Democratic Forces of the Roma, Permanent Macedonian Radical Unification, New Liberal Party, People's Movement for Macedonia, VMRO – Democratic Party, VMRO-United, Homeland Macedonian Organisation for Radical Renewal – Vardar–Aegean–Pirin, Macedonian Alliance, VMRO–Macedonia
2016	For a Better Macedonia	VMRO-DPMNE, Socialist Party, Democratic Party of Serbs, Union of Roma, Party for Justice, Citizen Option for Macedonia, Party of Democratic Action, Party of the Vlachs, Party for the Integration of the Roma, Workers' Agricultural Party, Permanent Macedonian Radical Unification, Macedonian Action, New Liberal Party, Party of United Democrats of Macedonia, Macedonian Alliance, Democratic Party of Turks, VMRO – Democratic Party, Bosniak Democratic Party, Democratic Party of Roma, Social Democratic Union, Roma Alliance of Macedonia, Union of Tito's Left Forces, United Party for Roma Equality, Movement for National Unity of Turks in Macedonia, Democratic Forces of the Roma
2020	Renewal for Macedonia	VMRO-DPMNE, Citizen Option for Macedonia, Movement for National Unity of Turks in Macedonia, Democratic Party of Serbs, Democratic Party of the Roma, Democratic Forces of the Roma, Macedonian Action, New Liberal Party, Party of the Vlachs, Party of United Democrats of Macedonia, United Party of Roma, Workers' Agricultural Party, Socialist Party, Serbian Progressive Party, Party of Democratic Action, Union of Tito's Left Forces, Party for the Integration of the Roma, Bosniak Democratic Party, independent candidates Adnan Arsovski and Adnan Kahil
