= 2006 Macedonian parliamentary election =

- 5 July 2006
- All 120 seats in the Assembly; 61 seats needed for a majority
Party	Leader	Vote %	Seats
For a Better Macedonia	Nikola Gruevski	32.62	45
Together for Macedonia	Vlado Bučkovski	23.40	32
BDI–PPD	Ali Ahmeti	12.16	16
PDSh	Arbën Xhaferi	7.53	11
VMRO – People's Party	Vesna Janevska	6.11	6
New Social Democratic	Tito Petkovski	6.06	7
Democratic Renewal	Liljana Popovska	1.86	1
European Future	Fijat Canoski	1.21	1
Independents	–	0.66	1
This lists parties that won seats. See the complete results below.
Prime Minister before	Prime Minister after election
Vlado Bučkovski; SDSM	Nikola Gruevski; VMRO-DPMNE

Parliamentary elections were held in Macedonia on 5 July 2006. The VMRO-DPMNE-led coalition emerged as the largest group in the Assembly, winning 45 of the 120 seats. Its leader Nikola Gruevski became Prime Minister after forming a coalition government with the Democratic Party of Albanians, New Social Democratic Party, Democratic Renewal and the Party for a European Future.

== Electoral system ==
The 120 seats were elected from six 20-seat constituencies by proportional representation. Seats were allocated using the d'Hondt method with an electoral threshold of 5%.

== Conduct ==
The international community sent 6,000 observers to monitor electoral procedures, as NATO and European Union officials saw the elections as a key test of Macedonian ambitions of joining both organizations after local elections in March 2005 were marred by irregularities. The campaign was marked by serious cross-political confrontations, occasionally resulting in violence, mainly between the two major ethnic Albanian parties, the Democratic Union for Integration (DUI) and the Democratic Party of Albanians (DPA). The situation was seen as seriously tarnishing the international reputation of the country. As the confrontations between the ethnic Albanian parties intensified, a diplomatic offensive from Western officials took place to put an end to the irregularities. These efforts were supported by the ethnic Macedonian parties, but also by calls from the Albanian and Kosovan prime ministers. However, the situation did not improve significantly. On 22 June 2006 there were clashes between the two major ethnic Macedonian parties VMRO-DPMNE and the SDSM in the center of Skopje.

The representatives of the EU and the United States continued with their efforts to stop the irregularities. NATO warned the Macedonian government that pre-election violence risked delays to the country's ambitions to join the military alliance. Problems within the Macedonian bloc stopped immediately and incidents between the Albanian parties also progressively stopped. The last week of the campaign was calm, with almost no incidents. There were no major problems on election day, with only minor irregularities in the western part of the country. The counting of the votes also passed almost without any objections. The Macedonian government, the European Union and the United States dubbed the elections "a success".

== Results ==
The results showed a clear victory for the coalition led by VMRO-DPMNE-led For a Better Macedonia coalition, which won 45 of the 120 seats. The centre-left Together for Macedonia coalition led by the SDSM won 35 seats. The majority of Albanian votes went to the DUI–PDP coalition (17 seats), while the DPA won 11 seats. Other parties that won seats included the New Social Democratic Party (7 seats), VMRO-NP (6 seats), Democratic Renewal of Macedonia (1 seat) and the Party for European Future (1 seat).

Party	Votes	%	Seats
For a Better Macedonia (Note: Of the 45 seats won by the coalition, the VMRO-DPMNE won 38, the Socialist Party 3, the Liberal Party 2, the Democratic Union 1 and the Union of Roma in Macedonia 1.)	304,572	32.62	45
Together for Macedonia (Note: Of the 32 seats won by the coalition, the Social Democratic Union won 23, the Liberal Democratic Party 5, the Democratic Party of Turks 2, the United Party of Romas in Macedonia 1 and the Democratic Party of Serbs in Macedonia 1.)	218,463	23.40	32
Coalition BDI–PPD–DSB (Note: Of the 16 seats won by the coalition, the Democratic Union for Integration won 13 and the Party for Democratic Prosperity 3.)	113,522	12.16	16
Democratic Party of Albanians	70,261	7.53	11
VMRO – People's Party	57,077	6.11	6
New Social Democratic Party	56,624	6.06	7
Democratic Renewal of Macedonia	17,364	1.86	1
Party for Economic Renewal	12,718	1.36	0
Agricultural People's Party of Macedonia	12,628	1.35	0
Party for a European Future	11,255	1.21	1
Democratic Alternative	11,067	1.19	0
Social Democratic Party	8,226	0.88	0
National Democratic Party	4,325	0.46	0
New Democratic Forces–Democratic Alliance of Albanians	4,117	0.44	0
National Alternative	3,325	0.36	0
Union of Tito's Left Forces	3,071	0.33	0
Democratic-Republican Union of Macedonia	2,745	0.29	0
League for Democracy	2,663	0.29	0
Macedonian Party	2,311	0.25	0
Permanent Macedonian Radical Unification	1,605	0.17	0
Radical Party of the Serbs in Macedonia	1,413	0.15	0
United Macedonians	1,324	0.14	0
Party for a Democratic Future	1,280	0.14	0
TMORO–VEP	1,280	0.14	0
VMRO – Democratic Party	1,206	0.13	0
Leftist Forces of Macedonia	992	0.11	0
Movement for National Unity of Turks	620	0.07	0
Communist Party of Macedonia	598	0.06	0
Democratic Party of Macedonia–Tetovo	588	0.06	0
Centre of Democratic Forces	134	0.01	0
Democratic Party "Go Macedonia–Forza"	87	0.01	0
Independents	6,164	0.66	1
Total	933,625	100.00	120
Valid votes	933,625	96.10	
Invalid/blank votes	37,873	3.90	
Total votes	971,498	100.00	
Registered voters/turnout	1,741,449	55.79	
Source: Slavic Research Centre

== Aftermath ==
After unsuccessful negotiations between VMRO-DPMNE and DUI, VMRO-DPMNE leader Nikola Gruevski decided to form a government with the DPA. After a tough negotiation process (especially between VMRO-DPMNE and NSDP), in August 2006 Gruevski announced that the new government would be composed of VMRO-DPMNE, DPA, NSDP, DOM and PEI, with the coalition partners holding 65 of the 120 seats in parliament.

The DUI–PDP coalition started protests throughout the Albanian-dominated parts of the country due to their exclusion from the coalition. In May 2007 the PDP accepted Gruevski's offer to join the government and in June the PDP became a coalition partner.

== See also ==
- History of the Republic of Macedonia
