= New Democracy (North Macedonia) =

Macedonian political party

New Democracy (Albanian: Demokracia e Re, Macedonian: Нова Демократија, Nova Demokratija) is a conservative political party of ethnic Albanians in North Macedonia. It was founded in 2008 by former members of the Democratic Party of Albanians, another ethnic Albanian party from North Macedonia. The president of the party is Imer Selmani, who was one of seven candidates for the 2009 Macedonian presidential election and won 146.795 votes (14,99%) and ended up third.

In the 2011 parliamentary election, New Democracy lost all of its seats, receiving only 1.76% of the popular vote.
