= European Front =

2024 minority coalition

European Front Fronti Europian Европски фронт
- Leader: Ali Ahmeti
- Founded: 2024
- Ideology: Minority interests Pro-Europeanism
- Political position: Centre-left
- Colors: Dark Blue; Gold
- Slogan: No to Russia, Yes to Europe (Albanian: Jo Rusisë, Po Europës)
- Assembly: 12 / 120

The European Front (Albanian: Fronti Europian, Macedonian: Европски фронт, romanized: Evropski front, Turkish: Avrupa Cephesi) is a political alliance in North Macedonia led by the Democratic Union for Integration. Member parties all represent national minorities

== Member parties ==
The member parties for the 2024 parliamentary elections until today are:

Abbr.	Name	Leader	Seats	Joined
BDI	Democratic Union for Integration; Демократска унија за интеграција Demokratska unija za integracija Bashkimi Demokratik për Integrim	Ali Ahmeti	10 / 120	2024
LP	People's Movement; Lëvizja Populli	Skender Rexhepi Zejd	1 / 120	2024
THDH	Turks Movement for Rights and Democracy	Salih Murat	1 / 120	2024

Members without seats:

- Democratic European Party (mergered with BDI)
- Roma Union
- Bosniak Democratic Party

=== Former members ===
Party	Abbr.	Leader	Seats	Member
Alliance for Albanians	ASH	Ziadin Sela	4 / 120	2024-2025
Democratic Party of Turks	TDP	Beycan İlyas	1 / 120	2024-2025
Democratic Party of Albanians	PDSH	Menduh Thaçi	1 / 120	May 2024 – October 2024
