= 2016 Macedonian parliamentary election =

- 11 December 2016
- All 123 seats in the Assembly; 62 seats needed for a majority
- Turnout: 66.79%
Party	Leader	Vote %	Seats	+/–
For a Better Macedonia	Nikola Gruevski	39.39	51	−10
For Life in Macedonia	Zoran Zaev	37.87	49	+15
BDI	Ali Ahmeti	7.52	10	−9
Besa	Bilal Kasami	5.01	5	New
ASh	Ziadin Sela	3.04	3	New
PDSh	Menduh Thaçi	2.68	2	−5
This lists parties that won seats. See the complete results below.
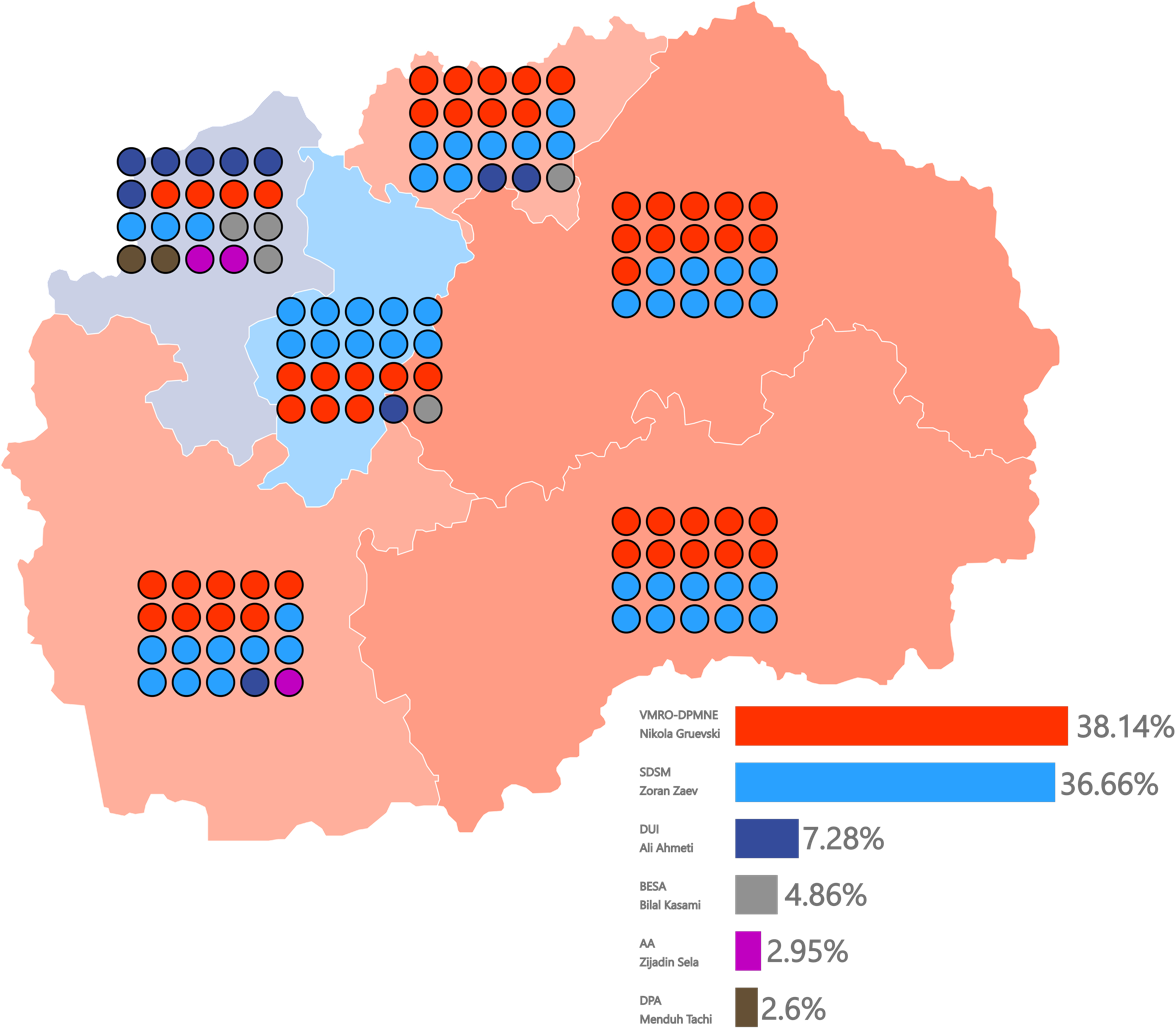
Results by constituency
Prime Minister before	Prime Minister after
Emil Dimitriev; VMRO-DPMNE	Zoran Zaev; SDSM

Early parliamentary elections were held in Macedonia on 11 December 2016, having originally been planned for 24 April and later 5 June.

The elections were held in the midst of a political crisis and national protests since 2015. The incumbent VMRO-DPMNE led government, which had been in government since the 2006 elections, were unable to form a coalition despite winning the most seats. The centre-left SDSM successfully formed a government with members of the Albanian-interest parties DUI and Alliance for Albanians following prolonged negotiations.

== Background ==
The elections were called as part of an agreement brokered by the European Union to end the protests against the government of Nikola Gruevski. The demonstrations were sparked by the wiretapping scandal involving high ranking politicians and security personnel. From 20 October 2015, a transitional government was installed including the two main parties, VMRO-DPMNE and the Social Democratic Union (SDSM). A new special prosecutor was appointed to investigate Prime Minister Nikola Gruevski and government ministers. According to the Pržino Agreement signed in mid-December 2015, Gruevski was required to resign as Prime Minister 120 days before the elections. Assembly speaker Trajko Veljanovski confirmed the date on 18 October.

== Electoral system ==
Of the 123 seats in the Assembly of the Republic, 120 are elected from six 20-seat constituencies in Macedonia using closed list proportional representation, with seats allocated using the d'Hondt method. The remaining three members are elected by Macedonians living abroad. However, the overseas seats would only be validated if the candidates received enough votes. As they did not, the seats were not awarded.

== Results ==
Party	Votes	%	Seats	+/–
For a Better Macedonia	454,577	39.39	51	−10
For Life in Macedonia	436,981	37.87	49	+15
Democratic Union for Integration	86,796	7.52	10	−9
Besa Movement	57,868	5.01	5	New
Alliance for Albanians	35,121	3.04	3	New
Democratic Party of Albanians	30,964	2.68	2	−5
VMRO for Macedonia (Note: VMRO – People's Party, Dignity, United for Macedonia)	24,524	2.13	0	0
The Left	12,120	1.05	0	New
Coalition for Change and Justice – Third Bloc (Note: Democratic Union, Front for Democratic Macedonia, DEMOS – New Better Macedonia, MORO–Labour Party)	10,028	0.87	0	New
Liberal Party	3,840	0.33	0	0
Party for Democratic Prosperity	1,143	0.10	0	0
Total	1,153,962	100.00	120	−3
Valid votes	1,153,962	96.82		
Invalid/blank votes	37,870	3.18		
Total votes	1,191,832	100.00		
Registered voters/turnout	1,784,416	66.79		
Source: SEC

== Aftermath ==
The Electoral Commission called a re-run for 25 December 2016 in Tearce and Gostivar, though in Gostivar it was called off after the VMRO-DPMNE filed a lawsuit against the decision, and in Tearce the outcome was unchanged.

=== Government formation ===
Although VMRO-DPMNE attempted to form a coalition with Albanian minority interest party DUI, coalition talks broke down in late January 2017. After that, the SDSM pursued informal coalition talks with the DUI, though as late as February 2017, coalition talks were frozen on the usage of the Albanian language. These talks were also blocked by VMRO-DPMNE President Gjorge Ivanov over fears of "a loss of sovereignty" to Albanians under the proposed government. A government was finally approved between SDSM and members of DUI and the Alliance for Albanians in May 2017. SDSM leader Zoran Zaev became prime minister.

Coalition talks were impacted by the storming of the parliament building in April. Protestors, who opposed the election of the first Albanian-speaker of Parliament, Talat Xhaferi, targeted MPs who belonged to Albanian-interest parties and the SDSM.
