= Movement for All-Macedonian Action =

Macedonian movement for independence

Movement for All-Macedonian Action (Dviženje za Semakedonska Akcija - MAAK) was a political party in Macedonia. The party was founded in February 1990, and sought to promote Macedonian independence. As a consequence of the overtly nationalistic name, and the lion as the party emblem, MAAK was initially seen as very radical. However, the party soon became seen as the party of intellectuals. MAAK's platform promoted the party as the party of all Macedonians, "regardless of social, national or religious affiliations, who accept the party's Program Declaration and Manifesto on free, independent and sovereign Macedonian state."

On November 12, 1990, the National Front was founded, composed of MAAK, VMRO-DPMNE, the People's Party and the Agrarian Party.

In September 1992, MAAK initiated a name-signature collecting campaign, demanding elections be held. The party claimed to have collected 128,000 signatures.

MAAK actively boycotted the second round in the 1994 parliamentary election.

== See also ==
- MAAK – Conservative Party
