= Radical Party of the Serbs in Macedonia =

The Radical Party of the Serbs in Macedonia (Serbian: Радикална странка Срба у Македонији, Macedonian: Радикална странка на Србите во Македонија, Radikalna stranka na Srbite vo Makedonija, RSSM) was a political party in the Republic of Macedonia. It is the Macedonian branch of the Serbian Radical Party. It won 0.4% of the vote in the 2008 parliamentary election.
