= MAAK – Conservative Party =

Conservative political party in North Macedonia

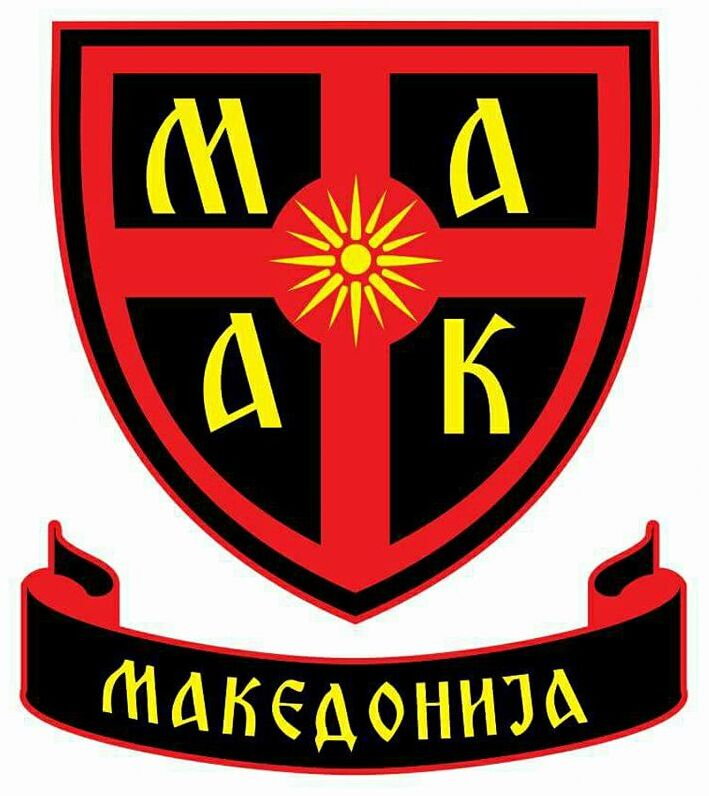
MAAK symbol Macedonian Action Party

Macedonian Action (formerly MAAK-Conservative Party) (Macedonian: Македонска акција, romanized: Makedonska akcija) was a political party in Macedonia. The party was led by Strašo Angelovski. The party claimed to be the legal inheritor of the Movement for All-Macedonian Action (MAAK).

MAAK-Conservative Party symbol

Although the party participated in all election cycles from the introduction of the multi-party system in the Republic of Macedonia until the Parliamentary elections in 2002, it never won a seat and enter the Parliament of the Republic of Macedonia. After the military conflict in the Republic of Macedonia in 2001, at a meeting of the leadership, the party changed its name from MAAK - Conservative Party to MAAK - United Macedonian Option (MAAK - EMO). The party ceased its political activity after the 2002 elections, when Strasho Angelovski was removed from the party's presidency and decided to join the party completely to VMRO-DPMNE.

Prior to the 2016 parliamentary elections, the party renewed its platform and joined a VMRO-DPMNE-led coalition For a Better Macedonia.

Prior to the 2020 parliamentary elections, the party joined a VMRO-DPMNE-led coalition Renewal for Macedonia.
