= National Democratic Revival =

National Democratic Revival Rilindja Demokratike Kombëtare Национална Демократска Преродба
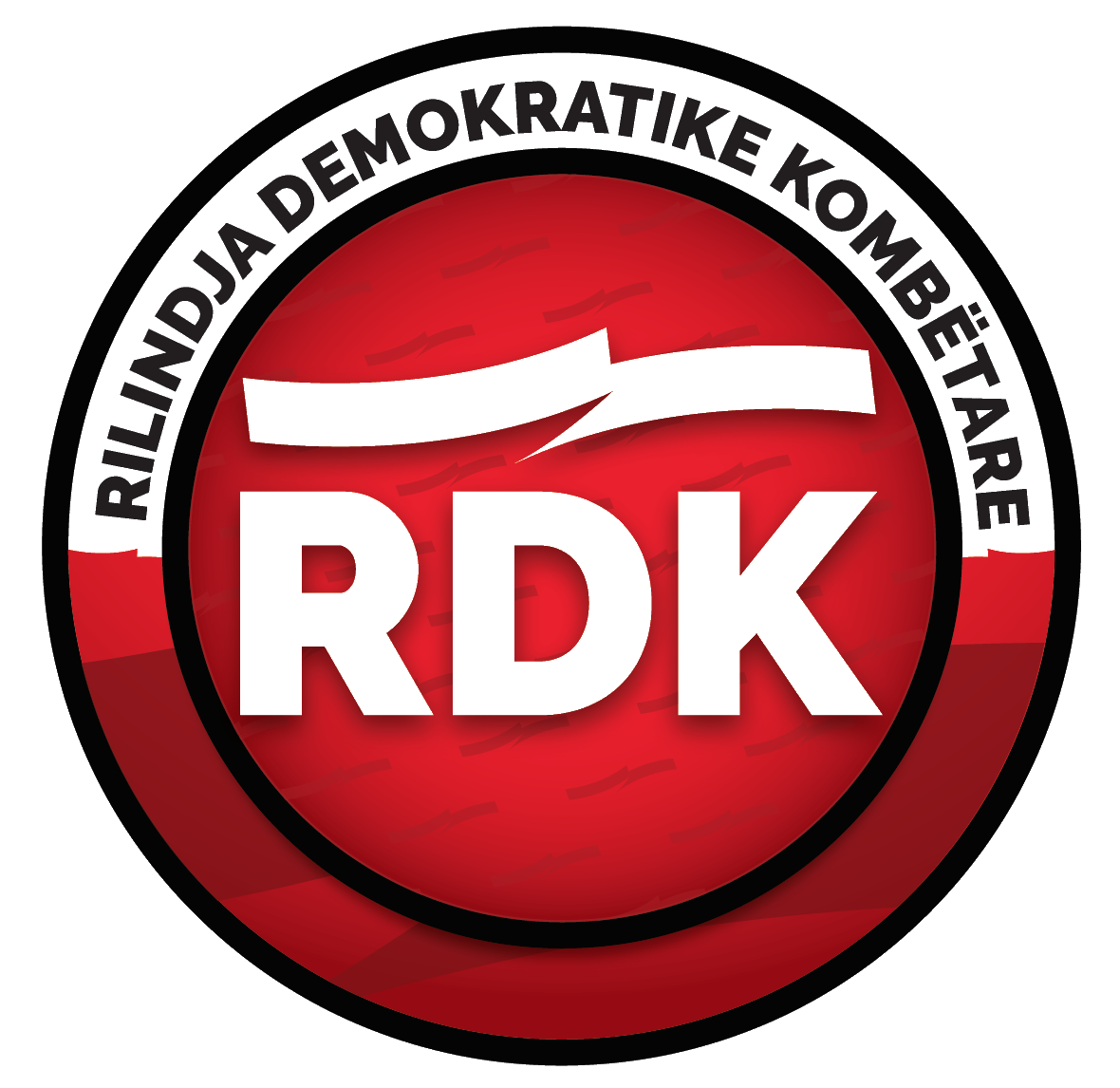
- Leader: Vesel Memedi
- Founded: 2011
- Headquarters: Bitpazarska 60; Čair, Skopje
- Ideology: Albanian minority interests Conservatism
- Political position: Centre-right
- Colours: White, red, and black
- Parliament: 0 / 120

Website
- www.rdk.org.mk

The National Democratic Revival (Albanian: Rilindja Demokratike Kombëtare, RDK, Macedonian: Национална Демократска Преродба, НДП, Nacionalna Demokratska Prerodba, NDP) is a political party in North Macedonia that is dedicated to the liberty and right of expression for the Albanian population. The conception of the party coincided with a period of great political turmoil in North Macedonia as a result of the Social Democratic Union of Macedonia, a Centre-Left and pro-European party, resisting the actions of the ruling party, the VMRO-DPMNE, and eventually boycotting Parliament.

== Performance and Modern Influence ==
In the 2011 parliamentary election, the party's first election, it received 2.67% of the popular vote, winning 2 seats in the Macedonian Parliament. These seats were held by Flamure Demiri-Kreci and Naxhi Xhelili.

Since before 2017, the RDK has not been a parliamentary force and has not joined any Albanian coalitions, remaining starkly independent, according to its leader, Vesel Memedi, despite the formation of the ethnic Albanian and predominantly Centre-Right VLEN alliance, a coalition closely aligned with RDK ideology.
