= Democratic Union for Integration =

Albanian minority political party in North Macedonia

Democratic Union for Integration Демократска унија за интеграција Bashkimi Demokratik për Integrim
- President: Ali Ahmeti
- Founded: 5 June 2002
- Headquarters: Skopje
- Youth wing: Forumi Rinor i Frontit Europian
- Ideology: Albanian minority interests Pro-Europeanism
- Political position: Centre-left
- National affiliation: European Front, National Alliance for Integration
- European affiliation: Party of European Socialists
- Colors: Blue; Yellow
- Parliament: 10 / 120
- Mayors: 4 / 81
- Local councils (Note: Also with coalitions.): 206 / 1,345
- Skopje City Council: 6 / 45

Party flag

Website
- www.bdi.mk

The Democratic Union for Integration (Macedonian: Демократска унија за интеграција, romanized: Demokratska unija za integracija, Albanian: Bashkimi Demokratik për Integrim) is the largest ethnic Albanian political party in North Macedonia and the third largest political party in the country. It was formed immediately after the country's 2001 armed conflict between the National Liberation Army and Macedonian security forces. NLA founder Ali Ahmeti has been the party's president ever since.

== History ==
The party was founded on 5 June 2002 by former NLA leader Ali Ahmeti, who has been the party's president ever since.

In the 2002 parliamentary election, the party won 12.1% of the popular vote (roughly 70% of the Albanian vote) and 16 of 120 seats, compared to 7 seats by Democratic Party of Albanians and 2 seats by Party for Democratic Prosperity.

From 2002 to 2006, it was part of the ruling "Together for Macedonia" coalition along with the Social Democratic Union of Macedonia (SDSM) and the Liberal Democratic Party.

In the 2006 parliamentary election, the party formed a coalition with the Party for Democratic Prosperity and the Democratic League of Bosniaks. This coalition received 12.2% of the vote and 16 seats. Although DUI won the most seats among ethnic Albanian parties (13), since their governmental partners lost the election, it was not invited by the newly elected Prime Minister Nikola Gruevski to participate in the government. Its place was taken by the second-largest ethnic Albanian political party, the Democratic Party of the Albanians.

However, after the 2008 early parliamentary election, the party returned to the government in a coalition with Gruevski's VMRO-DPMNE.

In the 2011 parliamentary election, DUI received 10.2% of the total vote, winning 15 seats, a loss of 3 seats from the previous election. DUI had the best election result in the 2014 parliamentary election when it received 153,646 votes (14.2%), winning 19 seats, and had the worst result in the next election in 2016, receiving 86,796 votes (7.5%). In 2016, DUI entered the government in a coalition with SDSM.

In the campaign for the 2020 parliamentary election, DUI made its participation in any coalition contingent on the nominee for Prime Minister being an ethnic Albanian, which both SDSM and VMRO-DPMNE have refused. On 18 August, SDSM and DUI reached a deal on a coalition government as well as a compromise on the issue of an ethnic Albanian Prime Minister.

On World Environment Day in 2021, Ahmeti announced the party will focus more on environmental issues, citing Greta Thunberg's activism as inspiring the party's new direction.

In 28 January Talat Xhaferi of Democratic Union for Integration has been elected as prime minister of the technical government of North Macedonia which, in accordance with the Pržino Agreement, will lead the country in the 100 days prior to the parliamentary elections scheduled for 8 May.

== Election results ==
=== Presidential elections ===
Election	Candidate	Votes	%	Votes	%	Result
Election	Candidate	First round		Second round		Result
2024	Bujar Osmani	120,811	13.71%	—N/a	—N/a	Lost ✗

=== Assembly elections ===
Year	Votes	Vote %	Seats	Seat change	Place	Status
2002	144,913	12.1	16 / 120	▲16	▲3rd	Government
2006	114,301	12.2	13 / 120	▼3	3rd	Opposition
2008	126,522	12.8	18 / 120	▲5	3rd	Government
2011	115,092	10.2	15 / 123	▼3	3rd	Government
2014	153,646	14.2	19 / 123	▲4	3rd	Government
2016	86,796	7.5	10 / 120	▼9	3rd	Government
2020	104,699	11.5	15 / 120	▲5	3rd	Government
2024	137,690	14.1	10 / 120	▼5	3rd	Opposition
