= Democratic Party of Albanians =

Albanian minority party in North Macedonia

Democratic Party of Albanians Демократска Партија на Албанците Partia Demokratike e Shqiptarëve
- Leader: Menduh Thaçi
- Founded: 4 June 1997
- Ideology: Albanian minority interests Conservatism
- Political position: Centre-right to right-wing
- European Parliament group: European People's Party Group (associate)
- International affiliation: International Democrat Union (observer)
- Colours: Red, Black (Colours of the Albanian flag)
- Assembly: 1 / 120

Party flag
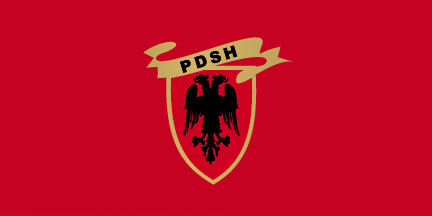

Website
- www.gurra-pdsh.org

The Democratic Party of Albanians (Albanian: Partia Demokratike e Shqiptarëve; Macedonian: Демократска партија на Албанците, Demokratska Partija na Albancite) or DPA is a political party of ethnic Albanians in North Macedonia. The DPA is a merger of the Party for Democratic Prosperity of Albanians (PDPA) and the People's Democratic Party (NDP) which took place in June 1997. The former party was established in 1994 after some radical members of the Party for Democratic Prosperity, led by Menduh Thaçi and Arbën Xhaferi, left the PDP and the latter party was founded in August 1990 as a more radical opponent of the PDP.

The party's main symbol consists of the black double-headed eagle found on the Albanian flag, but with white eyes, on a red background, again, found on the Albanian flag. This background is encased in a golden outline, with a waving flag-like object of the same colour, but with bold, black letters saying, "PDSH." The party flag is the coat of arms of the party, but with a red background, found on the Albanian flag.

== History ==
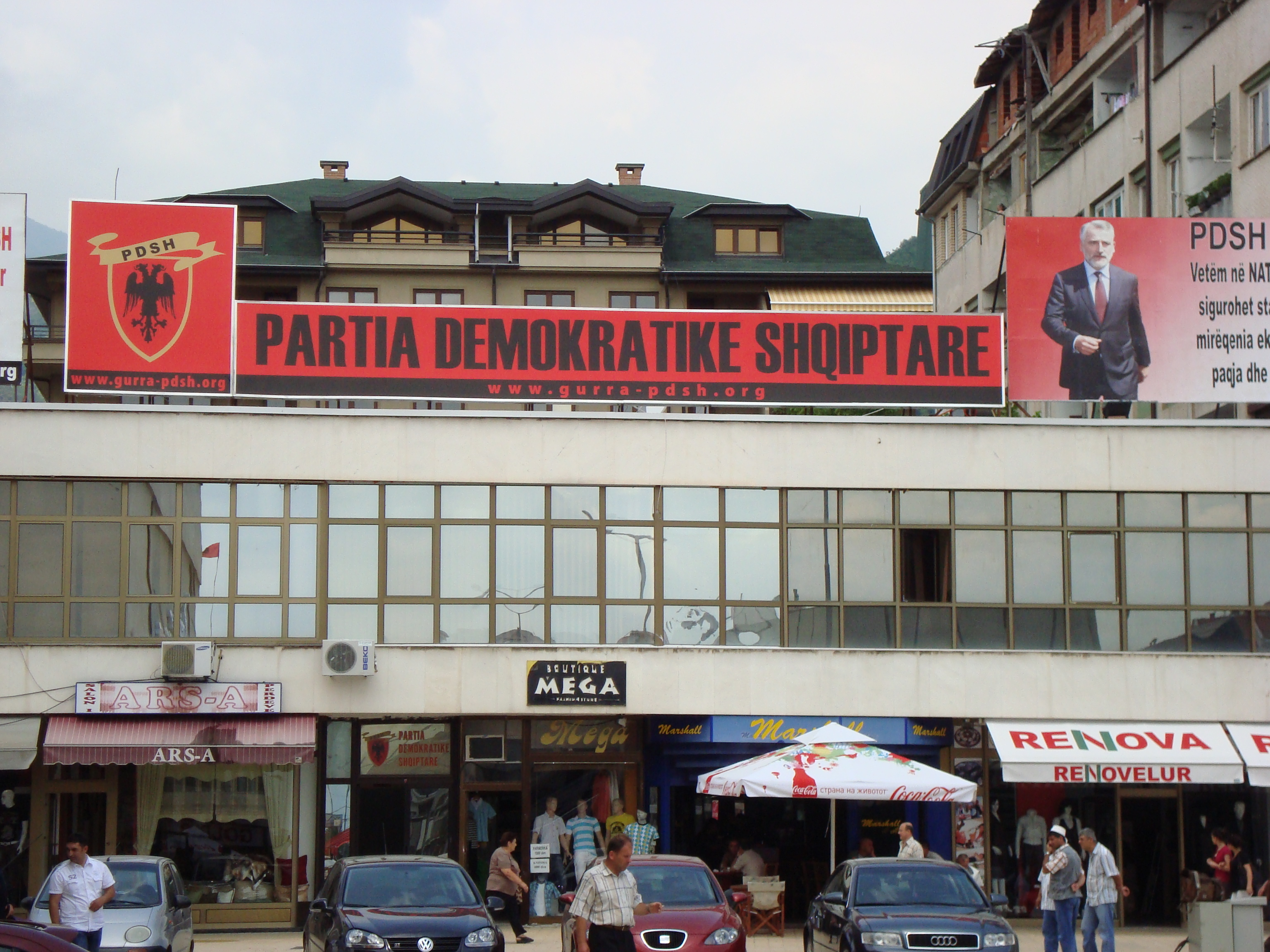
DPA sign in Tetovo

At the 2002 legislative elections, the party won 5.2% of the popular vote and 7 out of 120 seats. The party lost its status as a government party due to the defeat of the VMRO-DPMNE. At the 2006 parliamentary elections, the party increased its support, winning 7.5% of the vote and 11 seats. After the elections the DPA entered the government coalition led by the VMRO-DPMNE. DPA returned to opposition after the 2008 legislative early election.

In the 2011 parliamentary election, DPA received 5.9% of the popular vote, winning 8 seats. This is a loss of 3 seats from the previous election.

== Election results ==
=== Parliament ===
Election	Votes	%	Seats	+/–	Rank	Government
2002	63,695	5.33	7 / 120	Steady	4th	Opposition
2006	70,137	7.50	11 / 120	▲4	4th	Coalition
2008	81,557	8.26	11 / 120	Steady	4th	Opposition
2011	66,315	5.90	8 / 120	▼3	4th	Opposition
2014	66,393	6.13	7 / 120	▼1	4th	Opposition
2016	30,964	2.68	2 / 120	▼5	▼6th	Opposition
2020	13,930	1.53	1 / 120	▼1	6th	Coalition
2024	137,690 (European Front)	14.06 (European Front)	1 / 120	Steady	▲3rd (European Front)	Opposition
