= Party of United Democrats of Macedonia =

Political party in North Macedonia

Party of United Macedonian Democrats Партија на обединети демократи на Македонија Partia e Demokratëve të Bashkuar të Maqedonisë
- Leader: Živko Jankulovski
- Founded: 12 July 2008
- Split from: New Social Democratic Party
- National affiliation: Your Macedonia
- Colours: blue, white
- Parliament: 0 / 120
- Mayors: 0 / 81
- Local councils: 1 / 1,333
- Skopje city council: 0 / 45

Website
- podem.org.mk

The Party of United Democrats of Macedonia (Macedonian: Партија на обединети демократи на Македонија, ПОДЕМ; Partija na obedineti demokrati na Makedonija, PODEM, Albanian: Partia e Demokratëve të Bashkuar të Maqedonisë) is a centre-left political party in North Macedonia. It was founded on 12 July 2008 by former members of the New Social Democratic Party, after the 2008 parliamentary elections.
