= United Party of Roma in Macedonia =

Political party in North Macedonia

The United Party of Roma in Macedonia (Macedonian: Обединета партија на Ромите во Македонија, Obedineta partija na Romite vo Makedonija) is a political party in North Macedonia.

At the legislative elections on 15 September 2002, the party won 1 out of 120 seats, with their representation being Nezded Mustafa. They won this seat as part of the Together for Macedonia alliance, led by the Social Democratic Union of Macedonia and the Liberal Democratic Party.
