= Roma Alliance of Macedonia =

Political party in North Macedonia

The Roma Alliance of Macedonia is a political party that held one seat in the Assembly of North Macedonia in the parliament of 2016–2020. It represents the Romani people in North Macedonia.
