= Democratic Renewal of Macedonia =

Green liberal political party in North Macedonia

Democratic Renewal of Macedonia Демократска обнова на Македонија Rindërtimi demokratik i Maqedonisë
- Leader: Maja Morachanin
- Founded: 2006
- Headquarters: Skopje
- Ideology: Green liberalism
- Political position: Centre to centre-left
- National affiliation: For a European Future
- European affiliation: European Green Party
- International affiliation: Global Greens
- Colours: green yellow red
- Assembly: 0 / 120
- Mayors: 1 / 81
- Local councils: 27 / 1,333
- Skopje City Council: 2 / 45

Website
- dom.org.mk

The Democratic Renewal of Macedonia (Macedonian: Демократска обнова на Македонија, romanized: Demokratska obnova na Makedonija, Albanian: Rindërtimi demokratik i Maqedonisë) is a green-liberal political party in North Macedonia. This party actively promotes the green idea for North Macedonia. DOM's political objectives are: green jobs, renewable energy, human rights, democracy, ecology, tourism, eco-agriculture, women empowerment, culture, more funds for science and education. At their first elections, 5 July 2006, the party won 1.9% and 1 out of 120 seats. Starting in 2008, DOM has been part of a coalition run by Macedonia ruling party VMRO-DPMNE. In the parliamentary elections 2008 and 2011 DOM as part of the Coalition won 1 seat. 2016 DOM was part of the SDSM-led "For life in Macedonia" and won 1 seat.
