= Party for a European Future =

Party for European Future Партија за Европска Иднина
- Leader: Fijat Canoski
- Founded: 16 April 2006
- Ideology: Agrarianism; Economic liberalism Pro-Europeanism
- Political position: Centre
- National affiliation: We Can
- Colours: Yellow, Blue

Website
- www.pei.org.mk

The Party for a European Future (Macedonian: Партија за Европска Иднина, Partija za Evropska Idnina) is a political party in North Macedonia that largely represents Macedonian Muslims.

In the 2006 legislative elections, the party won 1 out of 120 seats. The party ran on the elections held on 1 June 2008, and again won 1 seat in the parliament. In the 2011 elections, it lost that seat.

The leader of the party is Fijat Canoski.
