= Serbian Progressive Party in Macedonia =

Serbian Progressive Party in Macedonia Српска напредна странка у Македонији Српска прогресивна партија во Македонија
- Leader: Dragiša Miletić
- Secretary-General: Igor Dimitrijević
- Founded: 2009
- Headquarters: Skopje
- Ideology: Conservatism; Serb minority interests
- Political position: Right-wing
- National affiliation: Renewal
- Regional affiliation: Serbian Progressive Party
- Colours: Red, Blue, White

The Serbian Progressive Party in Macedonia (Serbian: Српска напредна странка у Македонији, romanized: Srpska napredna stranka u Makedoniji, Macedonian: Српска прогресивна партија во Македонија, romanized: Srpska progresivna partija vo Makedonija SNSM;) is a political party in North Macedonia.

== Ideology ==
SNSM shares a variety of contacts with Serbian and other non-governmental organizations in the Republic of Macedonia, Serbia, Montenegro, Republika Srpska and elsewhere and with the core party, Serbia-centered Serbian Progressive Party (SNS). It is a separate and independent political organization, subject to the Constitution and legislation of the Republic of Macedonia.

SNSM (commonly referred colloquially only by the acronym "СНС" – "SNS") also puts strong premium on specifics of both chronic and acute problems of re-establishing and fortification of Serbdom (individual consciousness of oneself as an ethnic Serb, in community of other Serbs). The main principle of SNSM is Serbian identity politics and national empowerment as a hitherto marginalized ethnic group in Republic of Macedonia. It aims to preserve local Serbian heritage and tradition, emphasizing the multi-ethnic character of the country, advancement of organizational and materialized forms of aid to revival of Serbian academic studies, sustaining of the Serbian language and Serbian literacy, and improving the representation of Serbian pupils in Macedonia's schooling system.

The party also rejects anti-Slavic identity revisionism in Macedonia.

== History ==
It participated in the election for the unicameral Macedonian Parliament in 2008, but failed to gain any of the 120 seats. However, it has a number of elected local deputies and carriers of public offices on municipal level, in Kumanovo and the region of Skopska Crna Gora.

The party's popular support and enlisted membership comes mostly from the northern part of the country, primarily Kumanovo, city of Skopje with emphasis on Skopska Crna Gora region and to a lesser extent in the towns of Tetovo, Veles, and Poreč area.

At the extraordinary election for Parliament on June 5, 2011, the President of SNSM, Dragiša Miletić, was elected as a Parliamentary Deputy, as a candidate of his party within the block of parties whose most prominent political partner is SDSM.

During the first congress of SNSM held in the town of Kumanovo at 9 March 2014, delegates choose Vane Veličković for the new president of the party. Dragiša Miletić states that he considers Kumanovo congress illegitimate, while being elected as SNSM leader by a separate party congress, held in Banjanje, Skopska Crna Gora.

Dragiša Miletić joined the political coalition for premature parliamentary election in Republic of Macedonia (April, 2014) with the GROM party run by Mayor of Skopje municipality of Karpoš, Stevčo Jakimovski, and with Slobodan Ugrinovski's party Union of Tito's Left Forces as well with the Party of Free Democrats, led by Kiro Geštakovski.

== See also ==
- Democratic Party of Serbs in Macedonia
