= Liberal Democratic Party (North Macedonia) =

Social-liberal political party in North Macedonia

Liberal Democratic Party Либерално-Демократска Партија
- Leader: Monika Zajkova
- Founded: April 1997
- Merger of: Liberal Party; Democratic Party
- Headquarters: Skopje
- Ideology: Social liberalism
- Political position: Centre to centre-left
- National affiliation: For a European Future
- Regional affiliation: Liberal South East European Network
- European affiliation: Alliance of Liberals and Democrats for Europe
- International affiliation: Liberal International
- Colours: Yellow, Blue
- Parliament: 1 / 120
- Mayors: 1 / 81
- Local councils: 27 / 1,333
- Skopje City Council: 2 / 45

Party flag
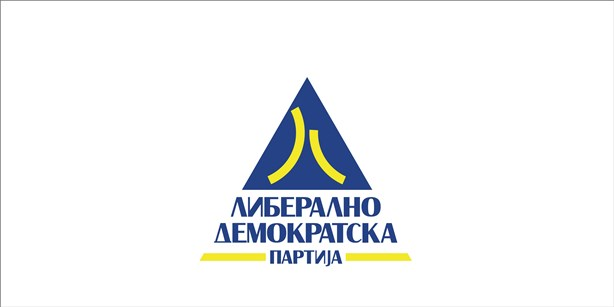

Website
- www.ldp.mk

The Liberal Democratic Party (Macedonian: Либерално-демократска партија, Liberalno-demokratska partija) is a social-liberal political party in North Macedonia. The Liberal Democratic Party was launched in April 1997 as a merger between the Liberal Party and the Democratic Party. The first leader of the party was Petar Goshev from the Democrats, who was also the last president of the League of Communists of Macedonia. When the Liberal Party was re-established in 1999, a significant portion of the former Liberal Party remained in LDP.

Since 1994 the LDP has been a member of Liberal International. The party is also an affiliate member of the Alliance of Liberals and Democrats for Europe Party. The party's president from 2006 until 2011 was Jovan Manasievski. In 2011, Andrej Žernovski was elected as the new leader of the party. He was in that position until 2015 when in the party's congress Goran Milevski was elected as president. The party's current leader is Monika Zajkova, elected in 2022.

== Electoral results ==
In the 2002 parliamentary elections, the party won 12 out of 120 seats as part of the Together for Macedonia alliance, led by the Social Democratic Union of Macedonia and the Liberal Democratic Party. After the 2002 elections it participated in the government together with the SDSM and the Democratic Union for Integration.

After the 2006 parliamentary elections, the Liberal Democratic Party did not remain in government.

The party participated in the 2009 Macedonian presidential election without entering in coalition with any of the larger parties. The candidate for presidency in the election was Nano Ruzin, who garnered 40,042 votes which equaled 4.06% of the popular vote in the first round of the elections.

In the 2011 parliamentary election, the Liberal Democratic Party lost all 4 of its seats, receiving 1.48% of the popular vote.

The party was part of the coalition "Alliance for the Future" alongside SDSM, VMRO-NP, NSDP, United for Macedonia and Dignity.

Following the 2013 local elections, the party's candidate for mayor, Andrej Žernovski, defeated the then mayor of the Centar Municipality, Vladimir Todorovik, taking a landslide victory in an election that lasted 3 electoral rounds. The opposition, led by SDSM, criticized the government and accused the government of bringing voters illegally from Pustec, a city in Albania. Further video material and strange names on the electoral lists revealed the information to be accurate. Nevertheless, the candidate of the opposition declared electoral victory following a very complicated and questionable election in the municipality. No answers were given by the current government in power in Macedonia, VMRO-DPMNE has rejected any accusations as false.

The LDP became a member of the Alliance of Liberals and Democrats for Europe Party on 2 December 2016. On the early parliament elections on 11 December 2016, the party was in coalition with SDSM. The coalition won 440 000 and 49/120 MPs in the Macedonian assembly, with the LDP itself winning three seats.
