= Menduh Thaçi =

Macedonian politician

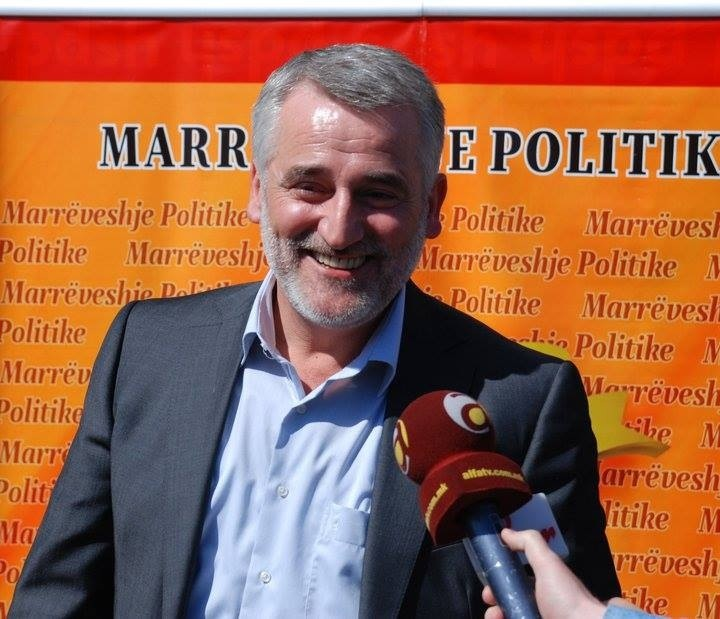

Leader of the Democratic Party of Albanians
- Incumbent
- Assumed office 2007

Personal details
- Born: March 3, 1965 (age 60); Tetovo, SR Macedonia, SFR Yugoslavia (modern day North Macedonia)
- Political party: Democratic Party of Albanians

Menduh Thaçi (Macedonian: Мендух Тачи; born 3 March 1965) is a Macedonian politician of Kosovan Albanian descent. He is the leader of the Macedonian political party Democratic Party of Albanians.

Thaçi was born in Tetovo and his parents were both Albanians from Kosovo, he is the fifth of six children. His family are from the Thaçi tribe. He attended primary and secondary school in Tetovo and graduated from the University of Pristina.

He has been an active politician for 30 years. He started as vice-president of the Party for Democratic Prosperity of Albanians (PDPA). In 1997 a merger was formed between the Party for Democratic Prosperity of Albanians (PDPA) and the People's Democratic Party (PDP).

He was vice-president until the year 2006, at that time he was chosen President of the Party, after Arbën Xhaferi resigned.

As of July 2012, along with DUI vice-president Xhevat Ademi, president of New Democracy Kastriot Haxhirexha, and seven other Macedonian Albanian political figures for involvement in the 2001 ethnic Albanian insurgency.
