= Socialist Party of Macedonia =

Macedonian political party

Socialist Party of Macedonia Социјалистичка партија на Македонија
- Leader: Ljupco Dimovski
- Founded: 22 September 1990
- Preceded by: SSRNJ (in North Macedonia)
- Headquarters: Skopje
- Ideology: Democratic socialism Social democracy
- Political position: Left-wing
- National affiliation: Your Macedonia
- Colours: Red, Yellow
- Assembly: 2 / 120
- Mayors: 0 / 81
- Local councils: 1 / 1,333
- Skopje city council: 0 / 45

Website
- www.spm.org.mk

The Socialist Party of Macedonia (SPM; Macedonian: Социјалистичка партија на Македонија, Socijalistička Partija na Makedonija) is a political party in North Macedonia founded on 22 September 1990 as a successor to the Socialist Alliance of Working People of Yugoslavia. The SPM proclaims itself to be a left-wing democratic socialist party. The SPM was part of the coalition governments from 1992 to 1998, led by the SDSM.

The party's first leader was Kiro Popovski from 1990 to 1995, while the second one was Ljubisav Ivanov-Dzingo from 1996 until his death in November 2020. The party's current leader from January 2021 is Ljupčo Dimovski.

In the 2002 legislative elections, the party won 2.1% of the popular vote and 1 out of 120 seats. Before this election the SPM broke its close relations with the SDSM and refused to take part in the SDSM led coalition government. In December 2003 the SPM formed a coalition with the Democratic Alternative and with the Democratic Union.

In the 2006 legislative elections, the party boosted its number of seats from 1 to 3 and participated in its first coalition government with the VMRO–DPMNE led by Nikola Gruevski.

In the 2008 legislative elections, the party maintained its number of seats at 3 and became the second largest party in the coalition government led by the conservative party VMRO–DPMNE.

In the government the party participated with 1 minister, Ljupčo Dimovski, minister for agriculture, forestry and water economy and one vice minister for transport and connections.

The party's youth wing is the Young Socialists of Macedonia.
