= Union of Roma in Macedonia =

Roma minority political party in North Macedonia

The Union of Roma in Macedonia (Macedonian: Сојуз на Ромите од Македонија, Sojuz na Romite na Makedonija) is a political party in North Macedonia supporting the rights of the Romani people in the country. At the 2006 legislative elections, the party won 1 out of 120 seats as part of coalition led by the VMRO-DPMNE. In 2017, after many years of participation in the coalitions led by VMRO-DPMNE, the party leader, Amdi Bajram stated that the party will no longer participate in the coalition. The party participated in a coalition with SDSM-Besa for the 2020 parliamentary elections.
