= Communist Party of Macedonia–Tito's Forces =

Communist Party of Macedonia–Tito's Forces Комунистичка партија на Македонија — Титови сили
- Leader: Slobodan Ugrinovski
- Founded: 26 October 2005
- Headquarters: Skopje, North Macedonia
- Ideology: Communism; Titoism
- Political position: Left-wing
- National affiliation: Renewal for Macedonia (2020)
- Colours: Light blue, Red

The Communist Party of Macedonia–Tito's Forces (Macedonian: Комунистичка партија на Македонија — Титови сили, romanized: Komunistička partija na Makedonija — Titovi sili), formerly the Union of Tito's Left Forces, is a Titoist party in North Macedonia. The party follows the ideology of Titoism and its leader is Slobodan Ugrinovski.

== See also ==
- Titoism
- Josip Broz Tito
