= Ali Ahmeti =

Macedonian politician (born 1959)

- Али Ахмети
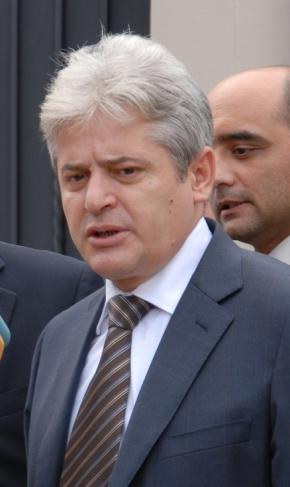
- Ahmeti in 2010

President of the DUI
- Incumbent
- Assumed office September 2002

Personal details
- Born: 4 January 1959 (age 67) Zajas, PR Macedonia, FPR Yugoslavia
- Party: DUI

Ali Ahmeti (Macedonian: Али Ахмети; born 4 January 1959), also known by his nom de guerre Abaz Gjuka (Macedonian: Абаз Ѓука) is a Macedonian politician who is the leader of the Democratic Union for Integration, and a junior coalition partner in the Macedonian government from 2008 to 2024. Ahmeti was the political leader of the former Albanian National Liberation Army in the 2001 insurgency in Macedonia.

== Life ==
Ali Ahmeti was born on 4 January 1959, in Zajas, PR Macedonia, FPR Yugoslavia. From 1979 to 1983, Ahmeti studied philosophy at the University of Pristina in Kosovo, graduating in 1983. Between 1981 and 1983, he also was one of the student leaders in the 1981 protests in Kosovo. For these activities, Ahmeti was arrested and imprisoned for one year by the Serbian and Yugoslav authorities.

Between 1984 and 1986, he was involved with the reconsolidation of the student movement (and general popular movement) in Kosovo. In 1986, Ahmeti gained political asylum in Switzerland, where he lived until 2001, and was working as a coordinator of different groups.

From 1988 to 1989, he was one of the leaders of the student and miners' protests against the Milosevic government. From 1989 to 1990, he was one of the main organizers of protests of the Albanian diaspora in Europe.

Ahmeti gained his political support from the National Movement for the Liberation of Kosovo. In the year 1986, he was elected as a member of the Main Council with a specific duty, interconnecting Kosovo with Europe. In the year 1988, he was elected as a member of the leadership of the National Movement of Kosovo. He was re-elected in this position in 1993, with a special duty in the military sector.

In 1996, he was one of the main founders of the Kosovo Liberation Army (KLA), and in 1998, when the war started, he was elected member of the main staff of the KLA. In 2001, he was elected Supreme Commander and political representative of the National Liberation Army (NLA).

After the signing of the Ohrid Agreement in August 2001, and the disarmament of the NLA in September, Ahmeti was engaged in the political process of the implementation of the agreement. In this light, he initiated and was named as a leader of the Coordination Council which unified all Albanian political parties in Macedonia, and the former structures of the NLA.

In June 2002, Ahmeti founded a new political party called the Democratic Union for Integration. In September 2002, DUI won the elections among Albanian parties in the republic and Ahmeti was elected as a deputy in the Macedonian Parliament. DUI entered in coalition with the winning party from the Macedonian block, Social Democratic Union of Macedonia (SDSM). In 2008, DUI entered in coalition with VMRO-DPMNE.

On 26 November 2019, an earthquake struck Albania. Ahmeti was part of a delegation of Albanian politicians from North Macedonia visiting the earthquake epicentre that expressed their condolences to the Albanian president Ilir Meta.

In September 2020, Ahmeti testified to prosecutors at the Kosovo Specialist Chambers regarding war crimes in the Kosovo War. In May 2024, he was honored with the title "Honorary Citizen of Tirana" in Albania.
