= Democratic Union (North Macedonia) =

Left-wing political party in North Macedonia

- Leader: Pavle Trajanov
- Secretary-General: Verica Filipovska
- Founded: March 25, 2000
- Headquarters: Skopje, North Macedonia
- Political position: Left-wing

The Democratic Union (Macedonian: Демократски сојуз, romanized: Demokratski sojuz) is a political party in North Macedonia. At the legislative elections of 5 July 2006, the party won 2 out of 120 seats as part of coalition led by the Internal Macedonian Revolutionary Organization–Democratic Party for Macedonian National Unity.

In the 2016 parliamentary elections, the Democratic Union participated in the "Coalition for Change and Justice" coalition composed of the FroDeM, MORO-RP and DEMOS parties. The coalition get 10,028 votes or 0.84% of the total number of votes and failed to win a parliamentary seat.

In the 2020 parliamentary elections, the party participated in a coalition led by SDSM and won 1 parliamentary seat.
