= People's Democratic Party (Macedonia) =

The People's Democratic Party (Macedonian: Народна демократска партија, Narodna Demokratska Partija, NDP) was an Albanian political party in Macedonia based in Tetovo.

== History ==
The party was established in July 1990, and was formally registered on 1 August. Iljaz Halimi was appointed party president, whilst Ibrahim Bedredin became secretary. It contested the 1990 parliamentary elections, at a time when Macedonia was still part of Yugoslavia. Running alone, it received 0.4% of the vote in the first round and 0.5% in the second, winning a single seat in the Assembly. It also ran in alliance with the Party for Democratic Prosperity in some areas, with the alliance winning five seats.

In the 1994 elections the party increased its vote share to 3%, winning four seats. In 1997 it merged with the Party for Democratic Prosperity of Albanians to form the Democratic Party of Albanians.
