= 1990 Macedonian parliamentary election =

- 11 November 1990 (first round); 25 November 1990 (second round)
Party	Leader	Seats
VMRO-DPMNE	Ljubčo Georgievski	38
SKM–PDP	Petar Gošev	31
PDP–NDP	Abduladi Vejseli	22
SRS–MDPS	Stojan Andov	17
SPM	Kiro Popovski	5
SJM		2
NDP	Iljaz Halimi	1
PCERM	Faik Abdi	1
Independents	–	3
This lists parties that won seats. See the complete results below.
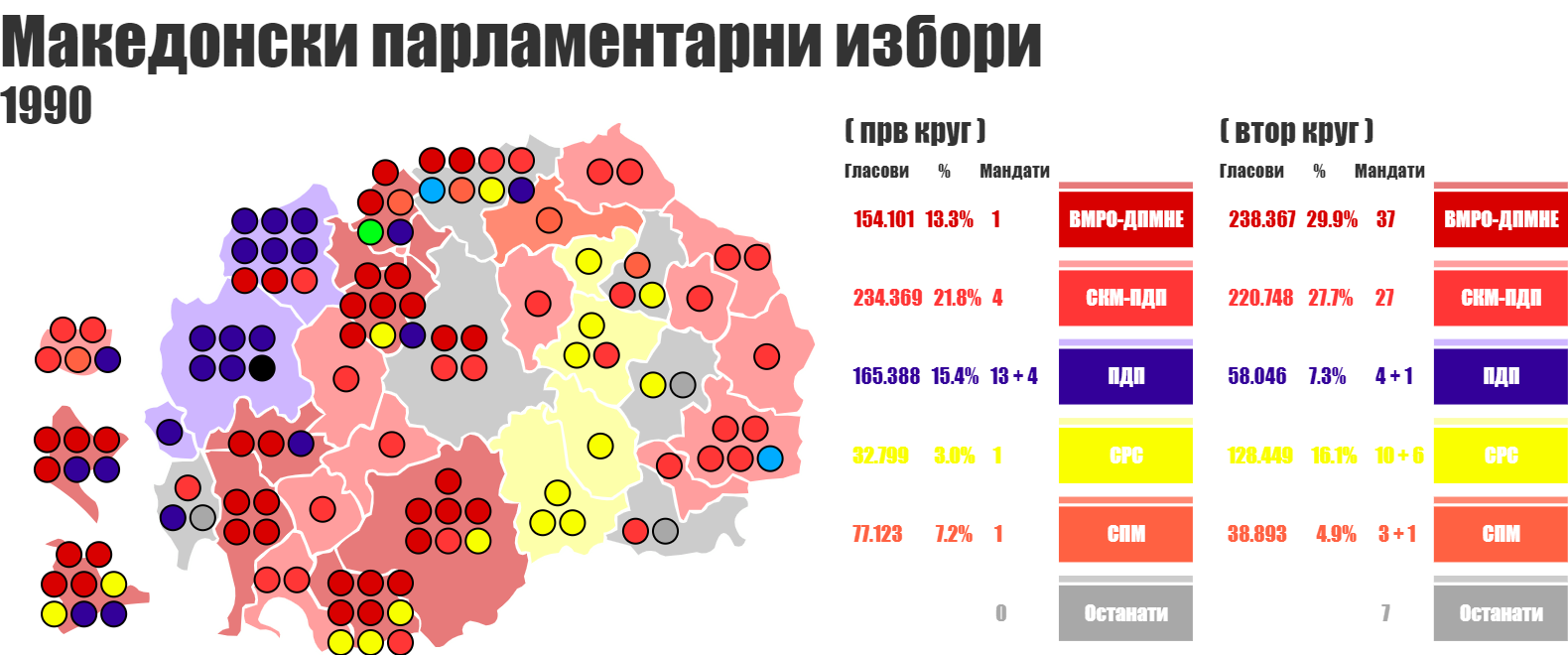
Results by constituency
Prime Minister before	Prime Minister after
Gligorije Gogovski; SKM–PDP	Nikola Kljusev; Independent

Parliamentary elections were held in the Socialist Republic of Macedonia on 11 November 1990, with a second round on 25 November. They were the first competitive elections in the country's history. VMRO-DPMNE emerged as the largest party, winning 38 of the 120 seats.

== Electoral system ==
The 120 members of the Assembly were elected in 120 single-member constituencies. If no candidate received over 50% in the first round, a second round was held and contested by every candidate who received over 7% of the vote in the first round. In the second round a majority was not required, and the candidate who received the most votes won the seat.

== Results ==
Party	First round			Second round			Total seats
Party	Votes	%	Seats	Votes	%	Seats	Total seats
League of Communists of Macedonia – Party for Democratic Change	234,369	21.79	4	220,748	27.71	27	31
Party for Democratic Prosperity	165,388	15.38	13	58,046	7.29	4	17
VMRO-DPMNE	154,101	14.33	1	238,367	29.92	37	38
Union of Reform Forces	142,564	13.25	1	128,449	16.12	10	11
Socialist Party of Macedonia	77,123	7.17	1	38,893	4.88	3	4
PDP–NDP	62,628	5.82	4	13,326	1.67	1	5
Movement for All-Macedonian Action	42,926	3.99	0	8,803	1.10	0	0
SRS–MDPS	32,799	3.05	0	31,236	3.92	6	6
Workers Party	31,591	2.94	0	2,923	0.37	0	0
Macedonian People's Party	26,151	2.43	0	4,806	0.60	0	0
Social Democratic Party	16,972	1.58	0	1,656	0.21	0	0
Party of Yugoslavs in Macedonia	16,898	1.57	0	13,331	1.67	2	2
Democratic Union–Party of Peasants	13,230	1.23	0	4,829	0.61	0	0
League for Democracy	13,097	1.22	0	2,707	0.34	0	0
SPM–MDPS	5,960	0.55	0	7,061	0.89	1	1
People's Democratic Party	4,597	0.43	0	4,105	0.52	1	1
PCERM–SPM	3,757	0.35	0	3,961	0.50	1	1
Democratic Alliance of Turks	3,384	0.31	0				0
Christian Democratic Party	2,779	0.26	0				0
Party for the Full Emancipation of the Roma of Macedonia	2,359	0.22	0				0
Workers-Peasant Party	1,896	0.18	0	726	0.09	0	0
MAAK–VMRO-DPMNE	1,698	0.16	0				0
SRS–SDPM	732	0.07	0				0
Union of Pensioners of Bitola	428	0.04	0				0
Independents	18,157	1.69	0	12,769	1.60	3	3
Total	1,075,584	100.00	24	796,742	100.00	96	120
Valid votes	1,075,584	94.70		796,742	95.85		
Invalid/blank votes	60,144	5.30		34,476	4.15		
Total votes	1,135,728	100.00		831,218	100.00		
Registered voters/turnout	1,452,072	78.21		1,083,051	76.75		
Source: State Election Commission, Nohlen & Stöver, Nineski

A total of 113,051 voters in the first round were not on the voter roll, but voted using their ID cards.
