= Liberalism in North Macedonia =

This article gives an overview of liberalism in North Macedonia. North Macedonia was not an independent country before 1991, so the parties from Serbia and Yugoslavia were active before that year. It is limited to liberal parties with substantial support, mainly proved by having had a representation in parliament. The sign ⇒ denotes another party in that scheme. For inclusion in this scheme it is not necessary for parties to label themselves as a liberal party.

== History ==
In the years immediately following independence, liberalism became a major force but, since 2000, the major political grouping has split into the liberal democrats and mainline factions. Nowadays, the liberals are divided into the Liberal Democratic Party (Liberalna Demokraticka Partija, member LI), part of the left of center government coalition, and the Liberal Party of Macedonia (Liberalna Partija na Makedonija, member ELDR), part of the right of center opposition coalition.

=== From Union of Reformist Forces in Macedonia to Liberal Party of Macedonia ===
- 1990: The Macedonian followers of Ante Marković established the Union of Reformist Forces in Macedonia (Sojuz na Reformiskite Sili na Makedonija), led by Stojan Andov.
- 1991: The party was renamed Reformist Forces of Macedonia-Liberal Party (Sojuz na Reformiskite Sili na Makedonija-Liberalna Partija) after the Young Democratic-Progressive Party joined the party.
- 1994: The party was renamed Liberal Party of Macedonia (Liberalna Partija na Makedonija).
- 1997: The party merged with the Democratic Party into the Liberal Democratic Party (Liberalno-Demokratska Partija).
- 2000: The LDP split and the Liberal Party of Macedonia (Liberalna Partija na Makedonija) was reconstituted with Andov as leader.

=== From Democratic Party of Macedonia to Liberal Democratic Party ===
- 1993: Petar Gošev left the SDSM and founded the centrist Democratic Party (Demokratska Partija)
- 1997: The party merged with the Liberal Party of Macedonia into the Liberal Democratic Party (Liberalno-Demokratska Partija)
- 2000: The LDP split and the Liberal Party of Macedonia was reconstituted. Most of the party continued as the Liberal Democratic Party, with Risto Penov as leader

== See also ==
- History of North Macedonia
- Politics of North Macedonia
- List of political parties in North Macedonia
