= Tetovo Fortress =

- Tetovo, North Macedonia
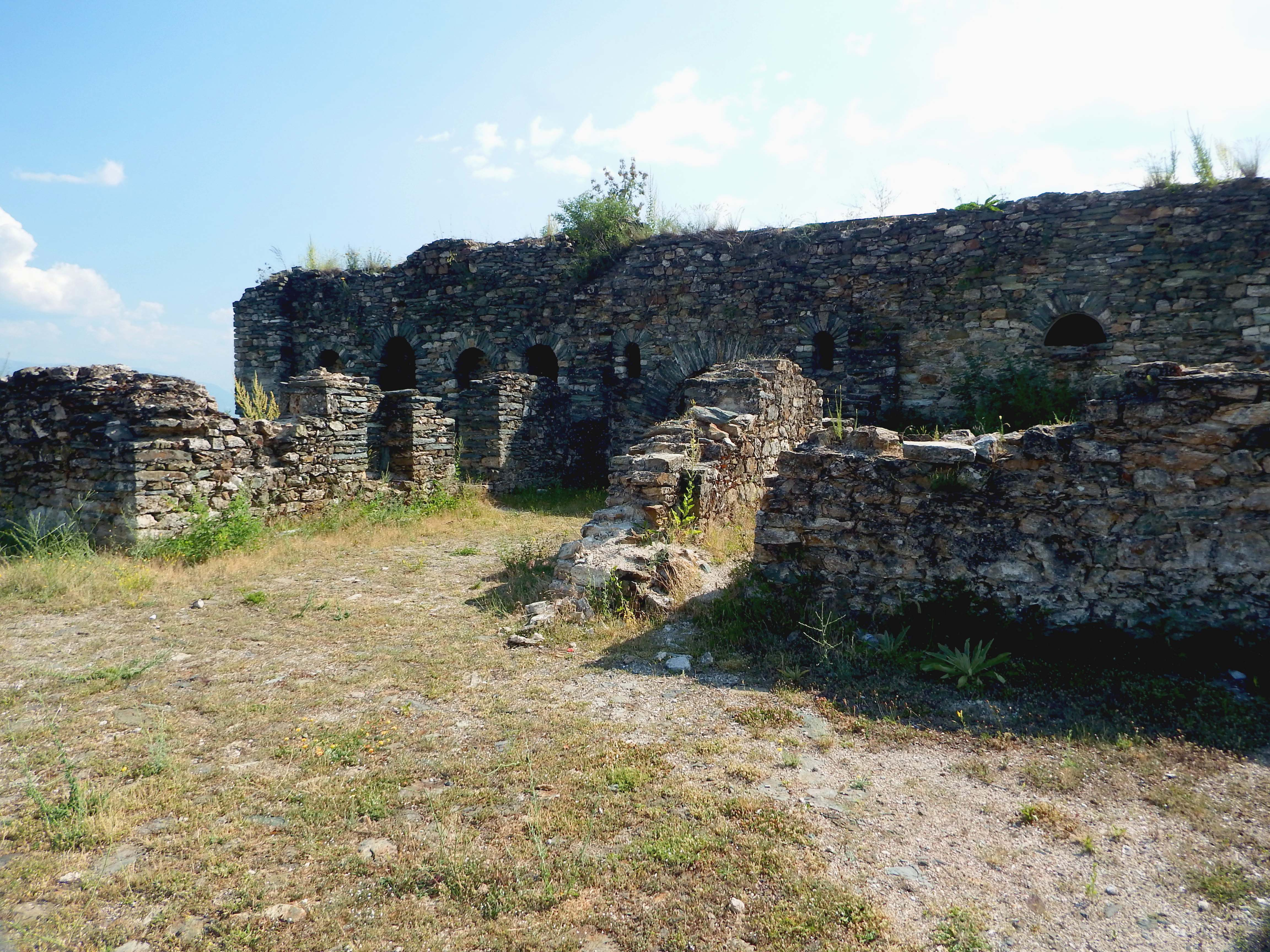

Site information
- Type: Fortress
- Open to the public: Yes

Location
- Coordinates: 42.025556°N 20.955833°E

Site history
- Built: 1820; 206 years ago
- Built by: Abdurrahman Pasha

The Tetovo Fortress (Macedonian: Тетовско кале; Albanian: Kalaja e Tetovës) is a ruined fortress and archaeological site in Tetovo, North Macedonia. Because of its location on a hill called Baltepe, it is also known as Baltepe Fortress. The fortress was built beginning in 1820 under Abdurrahman Pasha, who also reconstructed the Šarena Mosque. On the site previously stood a monastery dedicated to Saint Athanasius. The fortress was built with a guest house, a dungeon, a kitchen, a dining hall, and a fountain. Water did not flow from the fountain, reportedly, until Abdurrahman Pasha was summoned to Constantinople in 1843 on suspicion of treason. After his departure from Tetovo, the fortress fell into ruin. It is believed that three escape tunnels were built from the fortress: one to the city center, one to the upper part of Tetovo, and one to the village of Lavce.

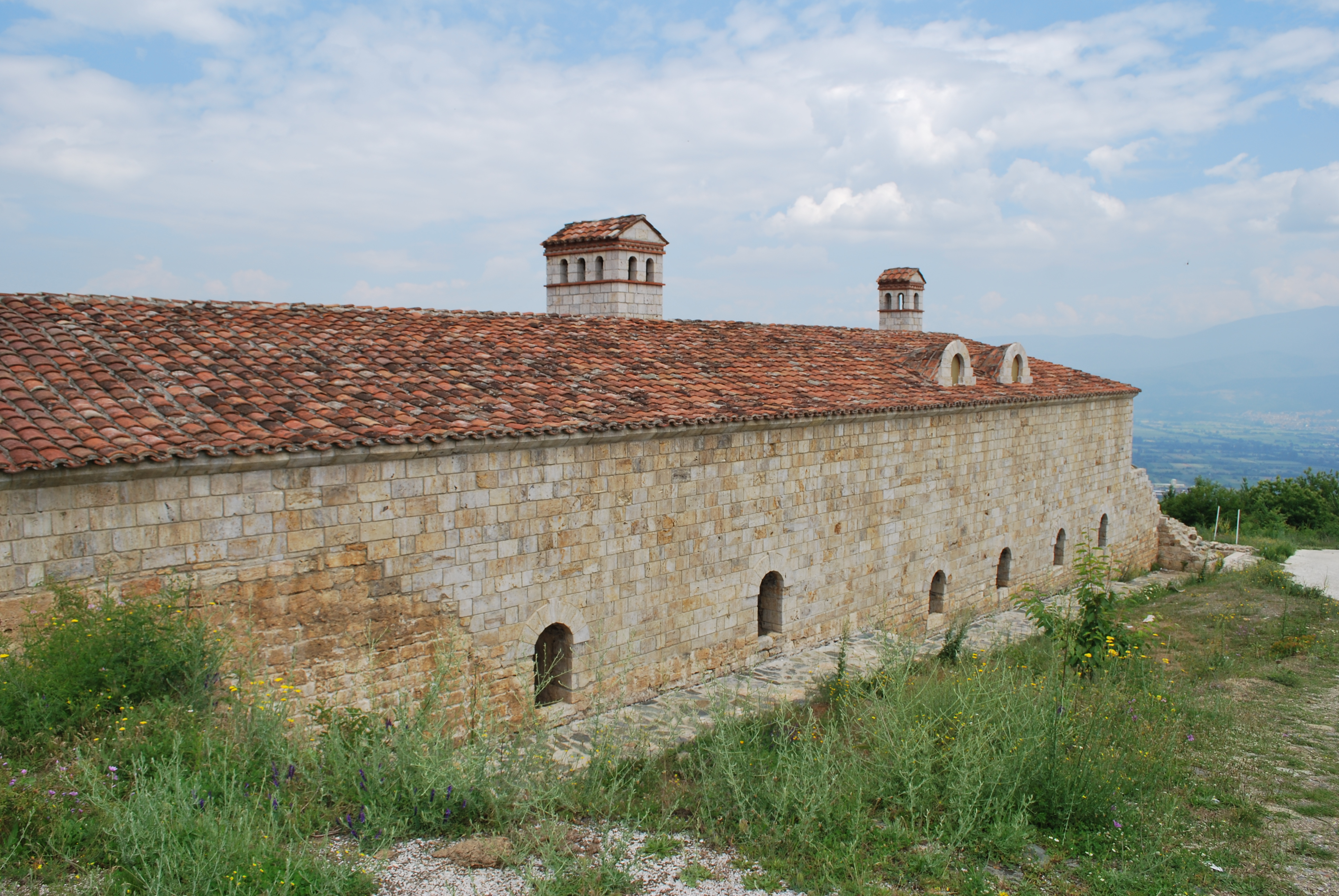
Restored building at Tetovo Fortress

In 1922, a new church dedicated to Saint Athanasius was built on the foundations of the medieval one.

On March 21, 2001, NLA insurgents invaded the fortress. The fortress was retaken by Macedonian forces 5 days later, on March 26.

A monument commemorating the National Liberation War, designed by Bogdan Bogdanović, was erected beneath the fortress. The memorial was destroyed a few days later.

Excavation and restoration work occurred at the fortress from 2008 to 2012, alongside reconstruction of the Church of Saint Athanasius. From 2001 until this reconstruction, the church had been stolen from about five times.

== Gallery ==
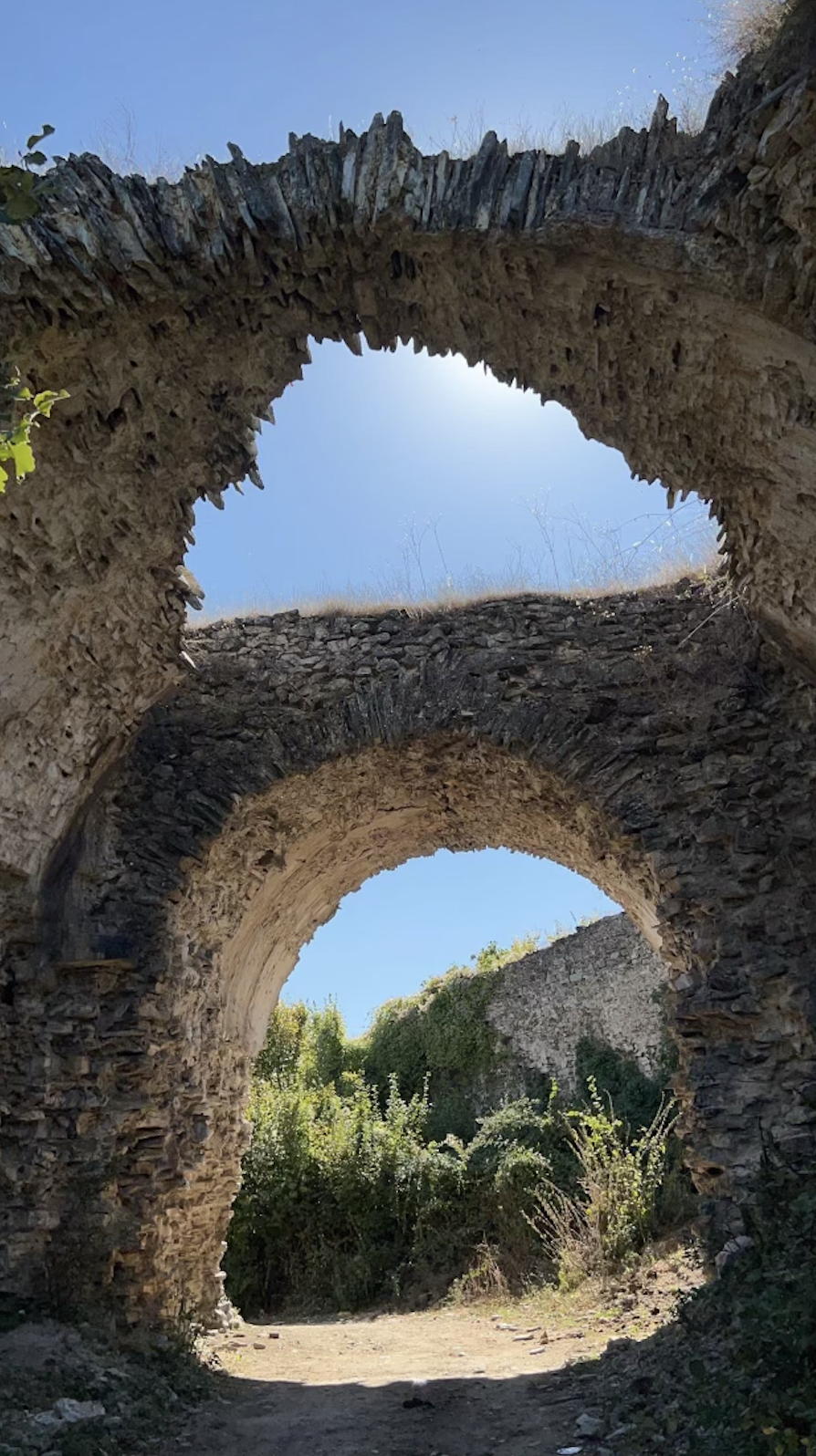
Gate of Tetovo Fortress

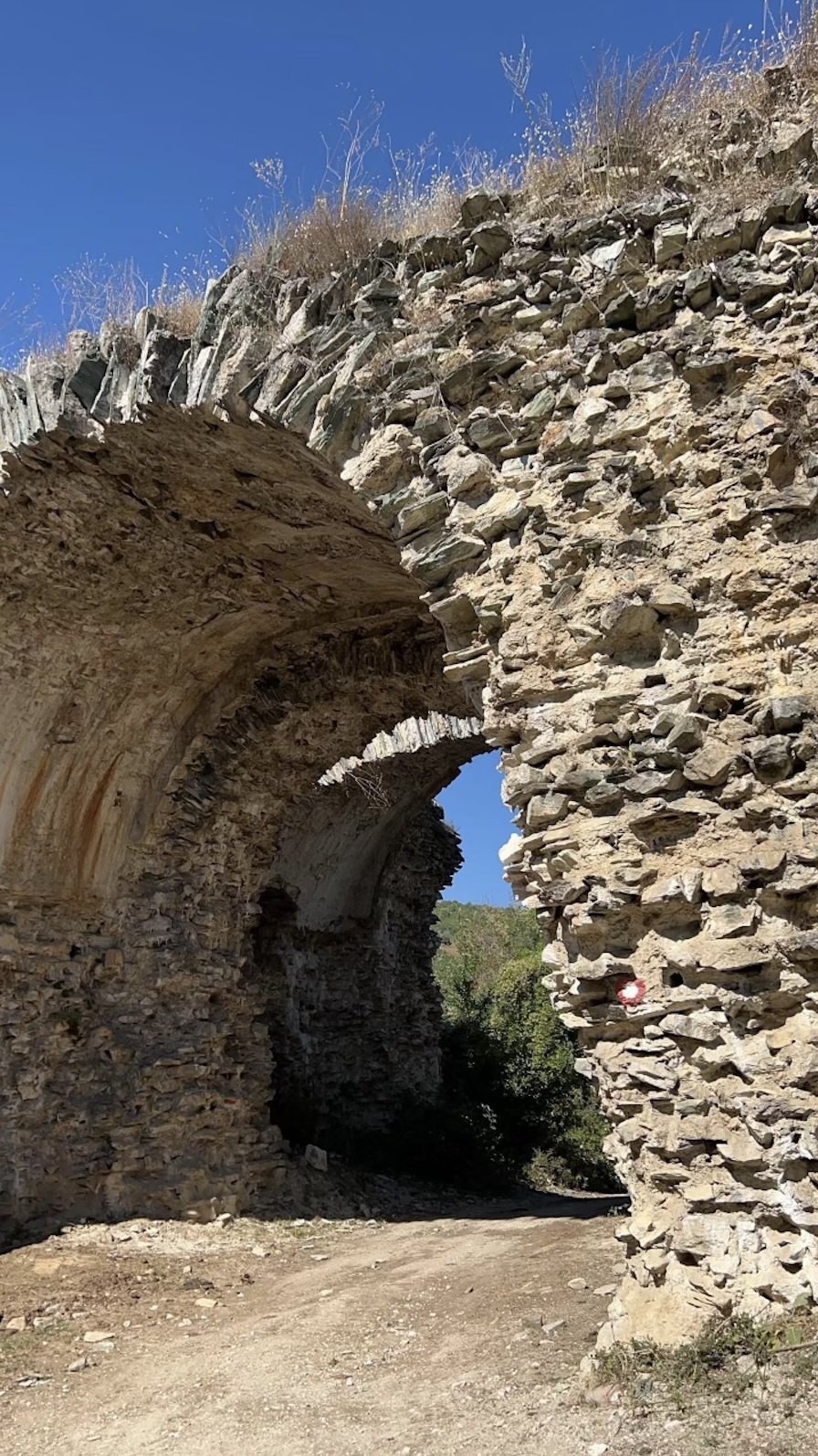
Gate of Tetovo Fortress

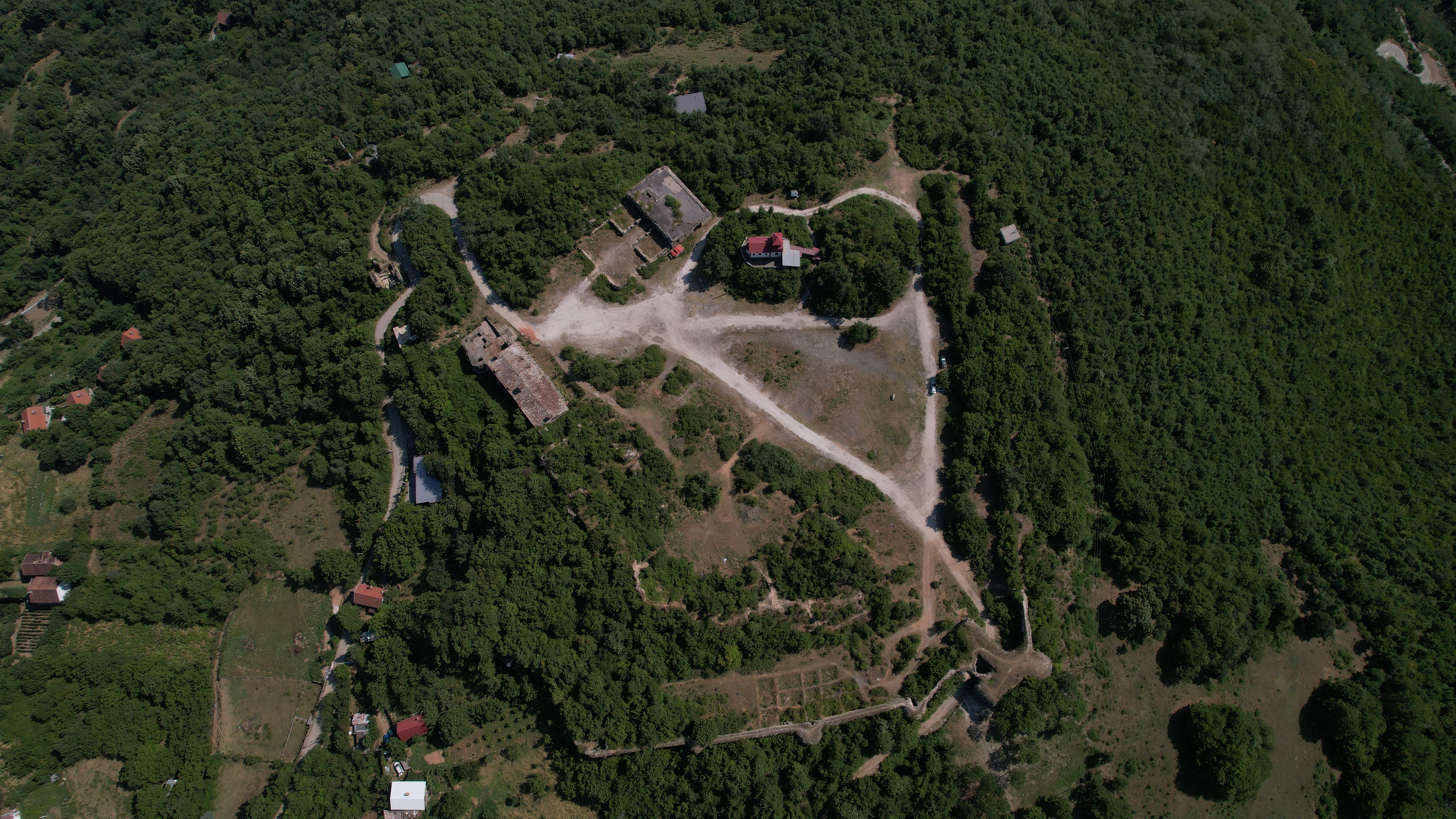
Air view of the fortress
