= Party of Yugoslavs in Macedonia =

The Party of Yugoslavs in Macedonia (Macedonian: Странка на Југословените, Stranka na Jugoslovenite vo Makedonija, SJM) was a political party in Macedonia.

== History ==
Registered in May 1990 as the Party of Yugoslavs, the party's main policy was the preservation of Yugoslavia. It contested the 1990 parliamentary elections, receiving 1.6% of the vote in the first round and 1.7% in the second. It won two seats, taken by Risto Kelesov (in Kumanovo) and Risto Stamenov (in Strumica).

The party was later renamed Party of Yugoslavs in Macedonia–YUGA (Yugoslav Union Civil Alliance), but following the breakup of Yugoslavia and the independence of Macedonia, the party did not contest any further national elections.
