= Tetovo =

Tetovo Тетово (Macedonian) Tetovë/Tetova (Albanian)
- City
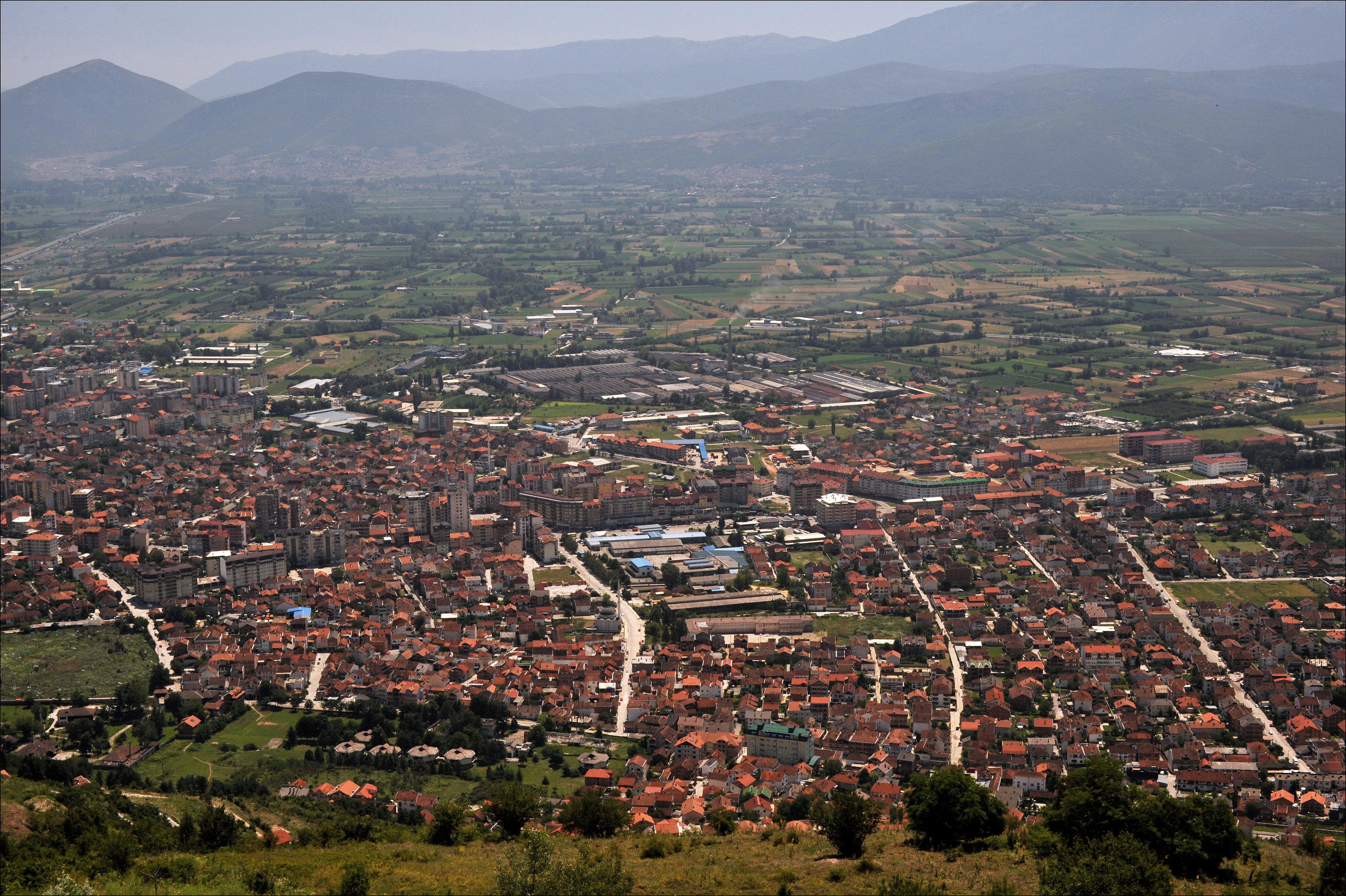
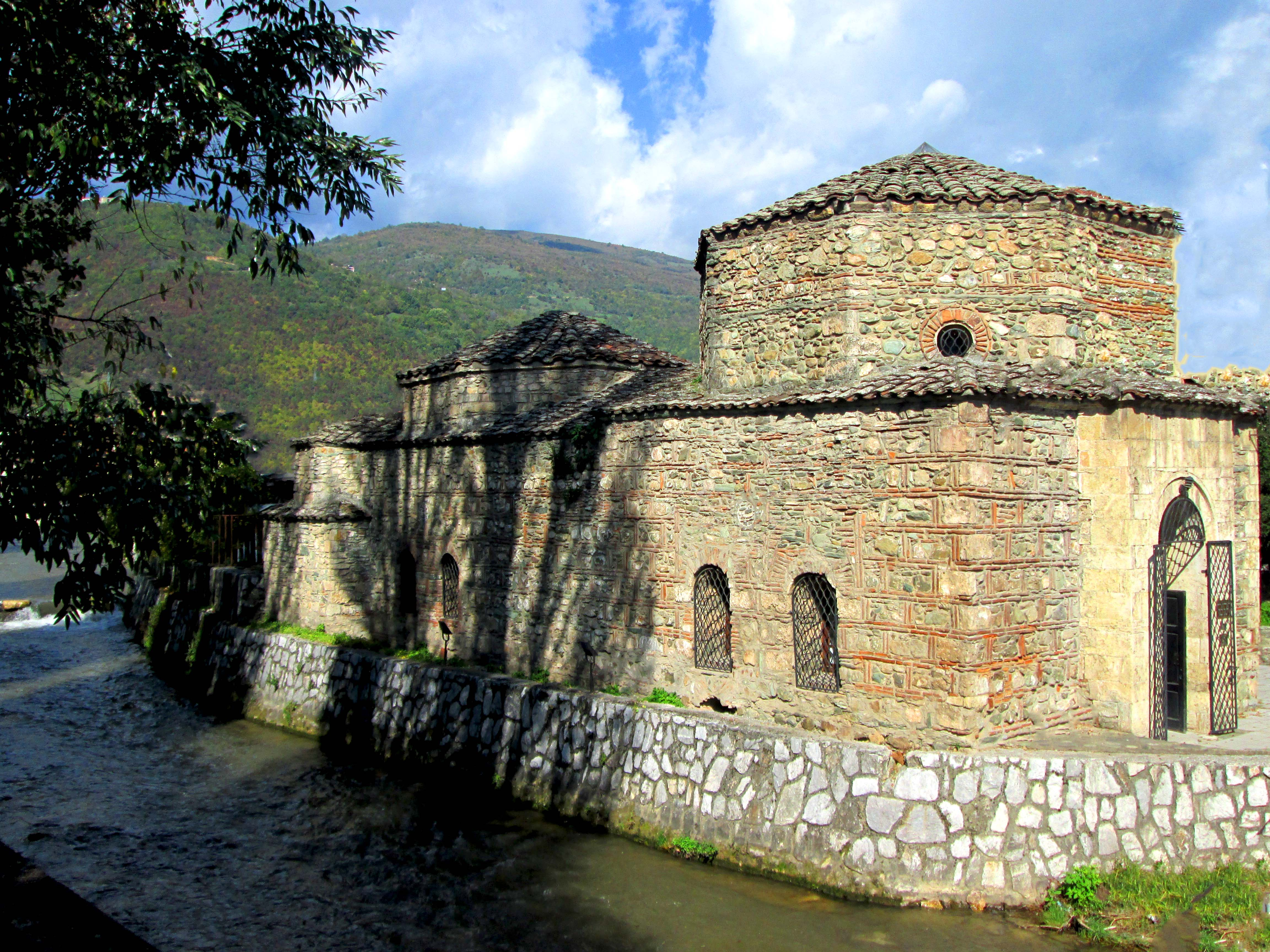
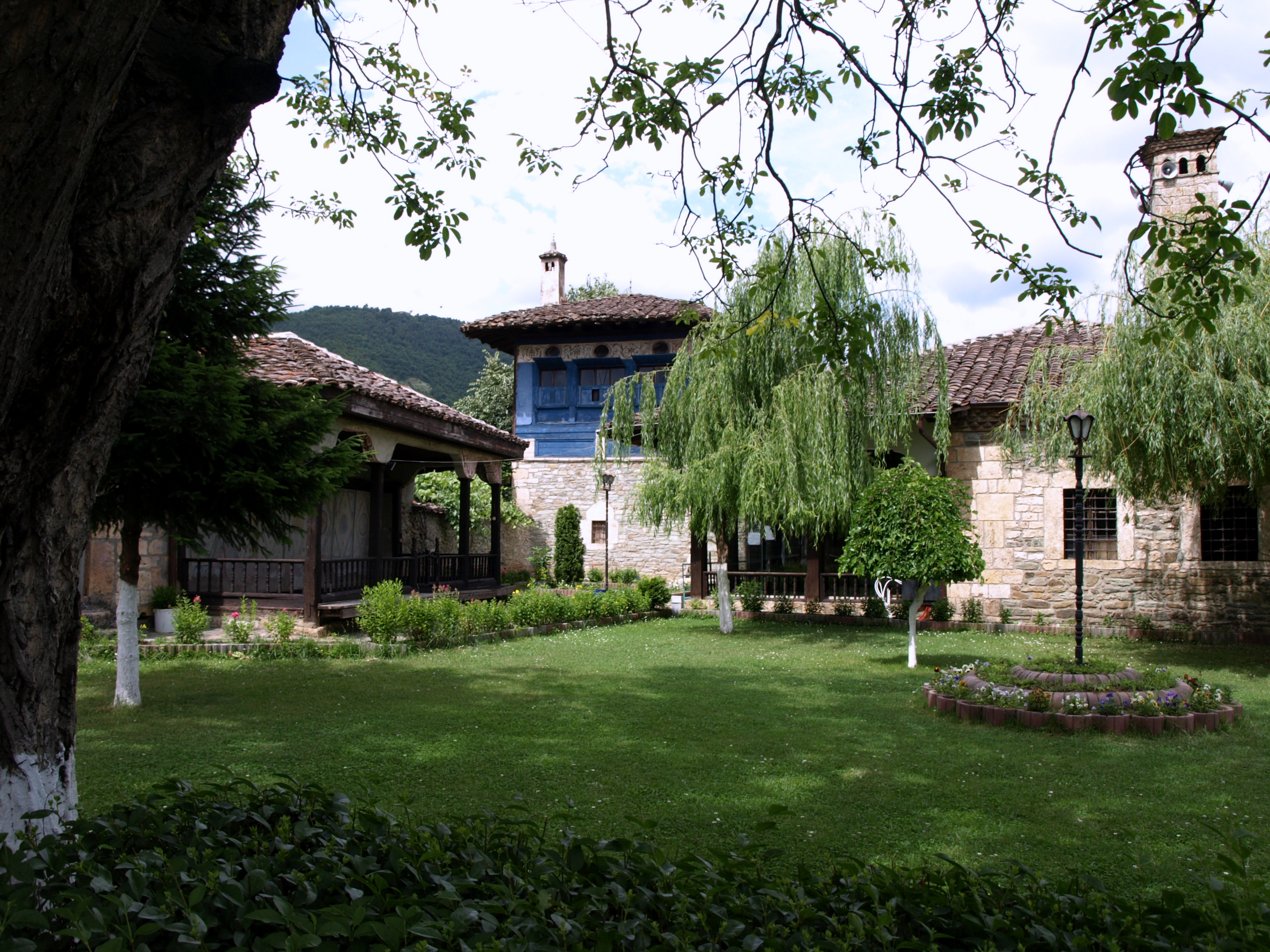
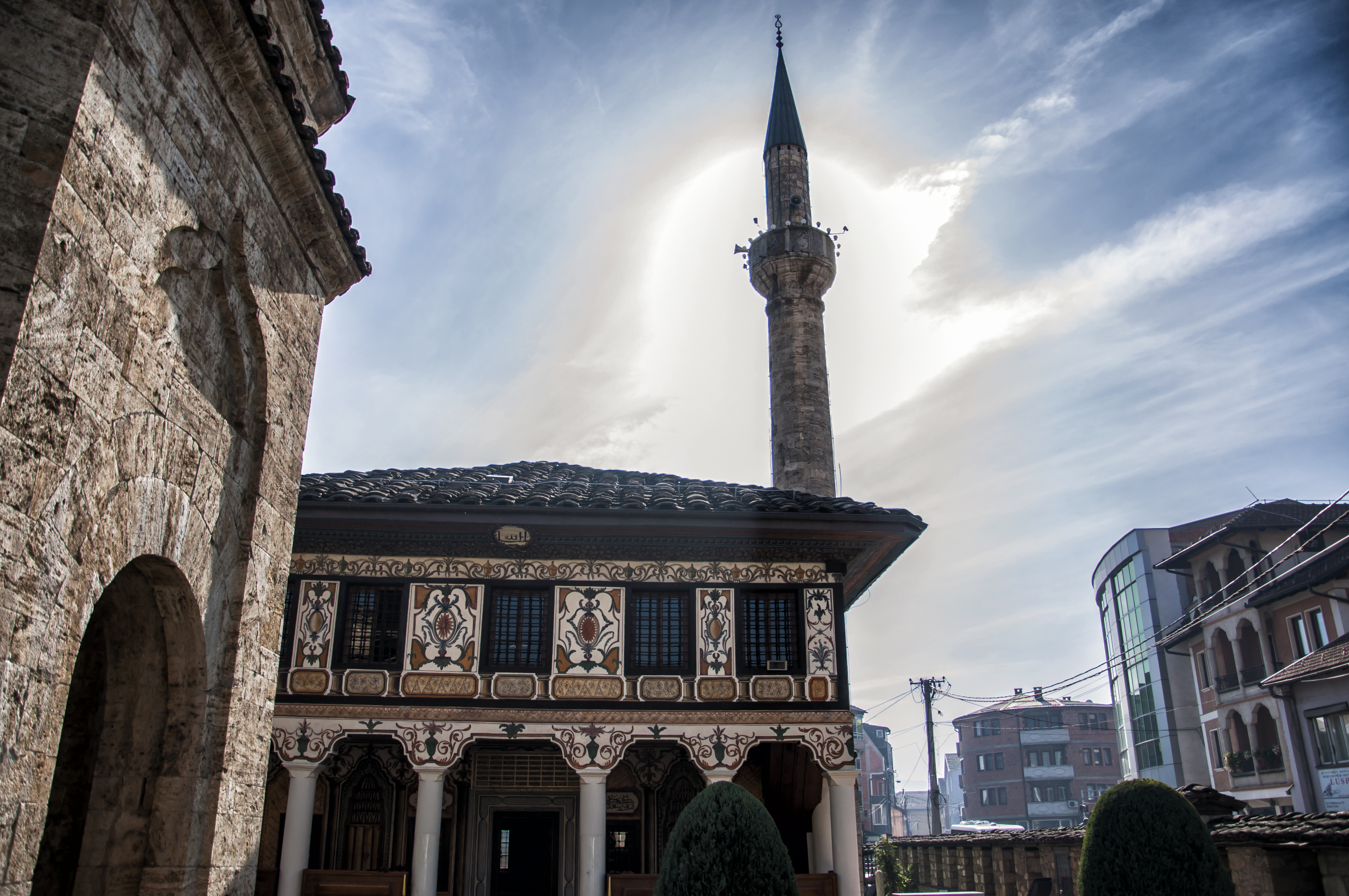
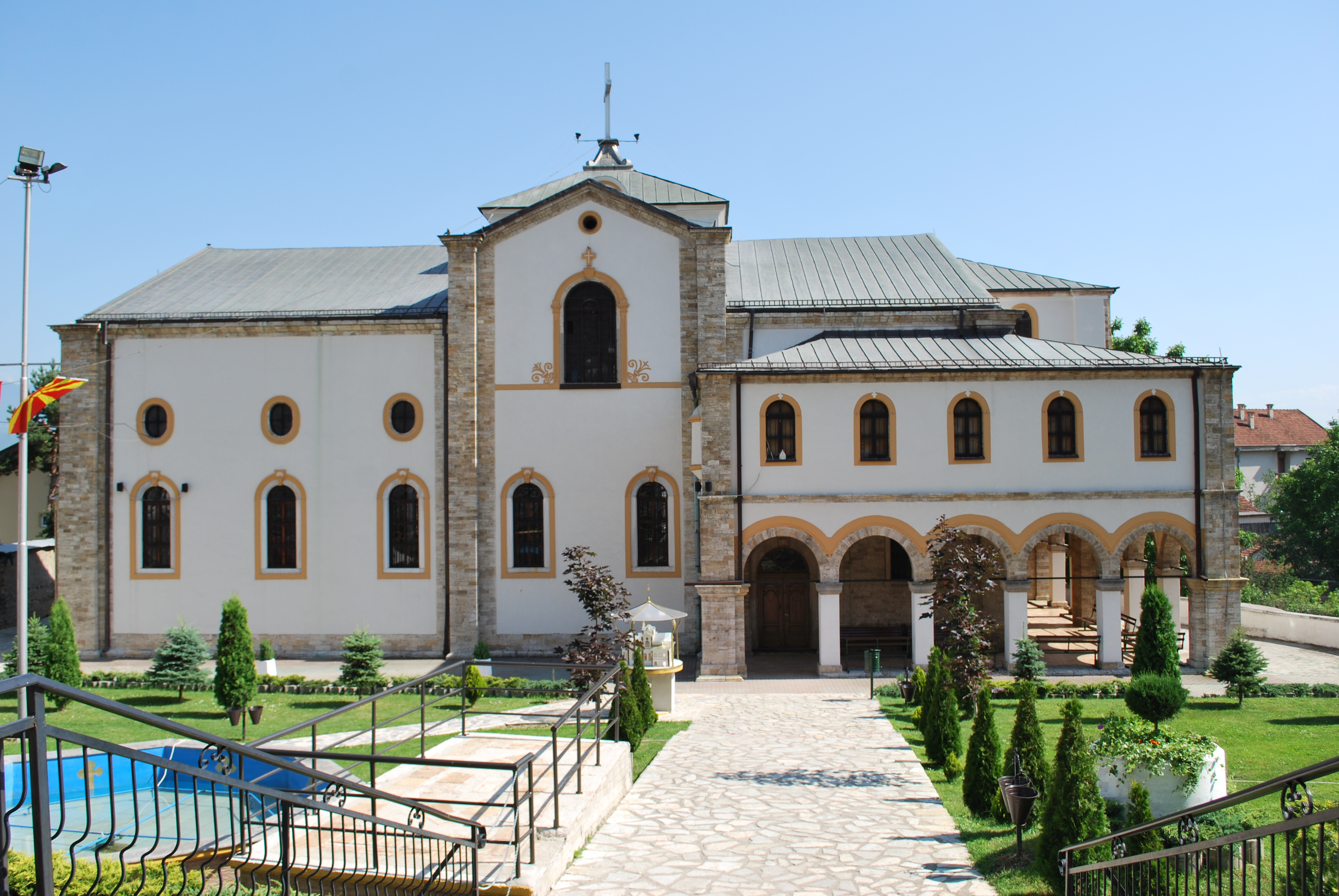
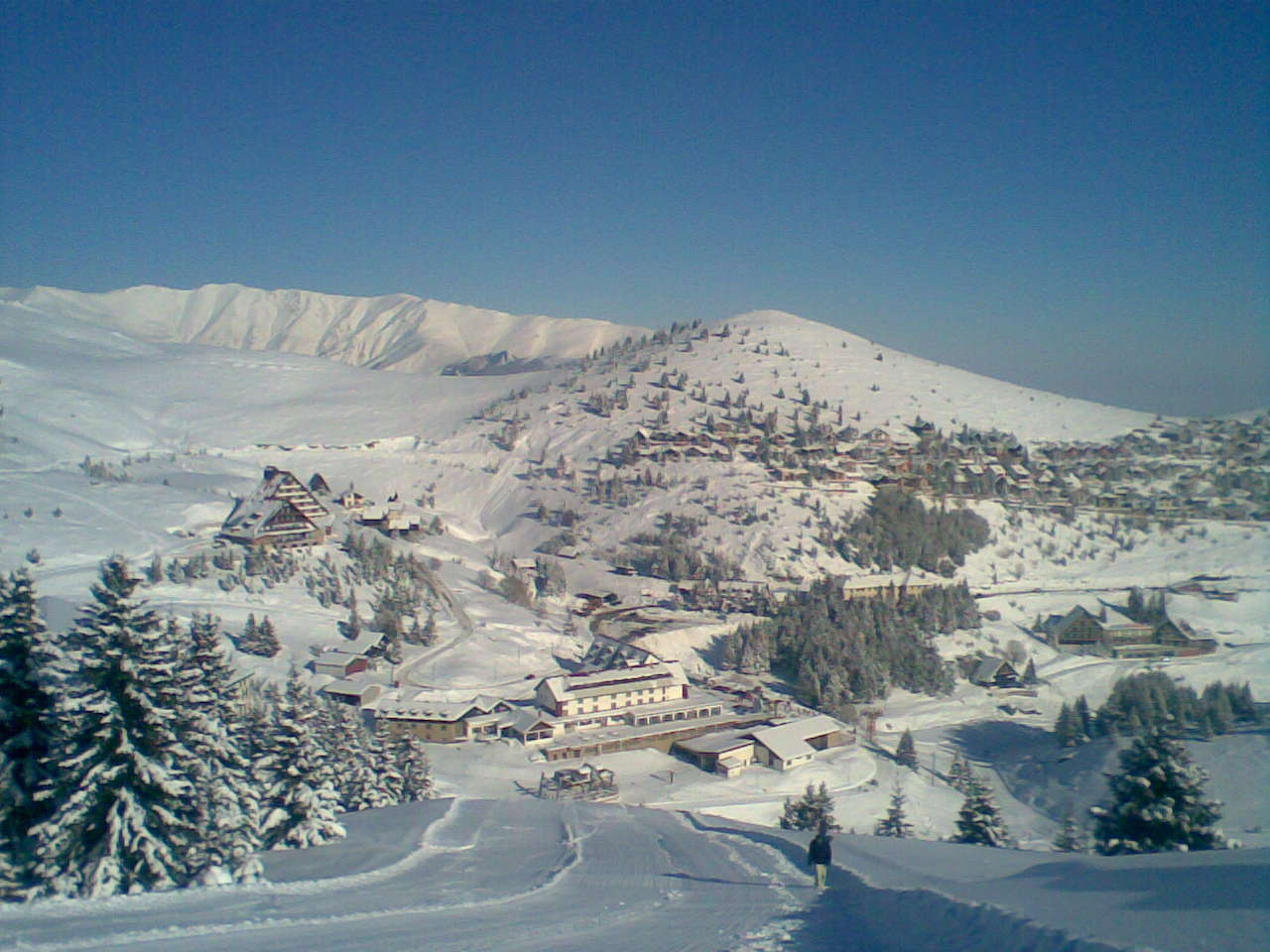
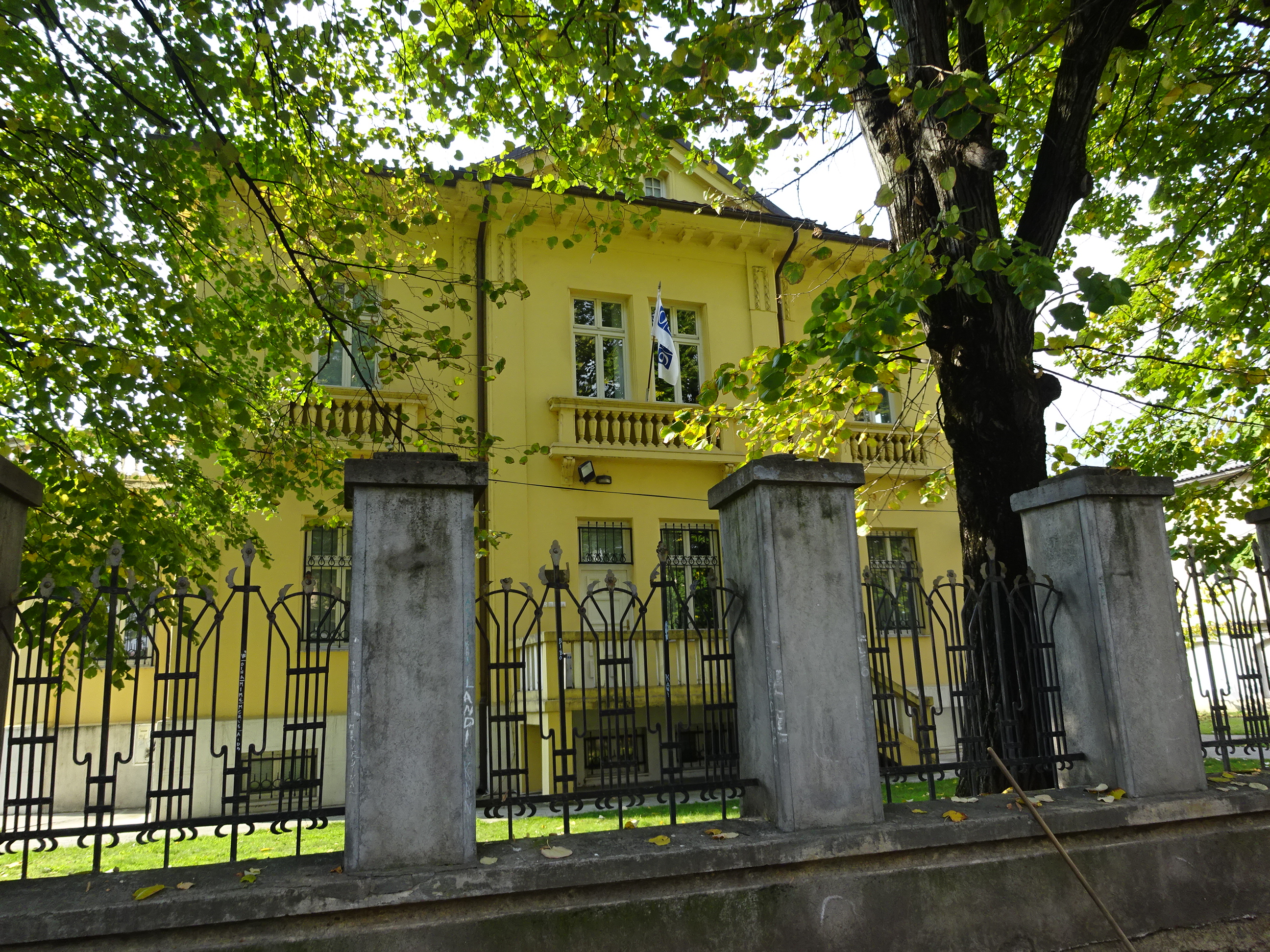
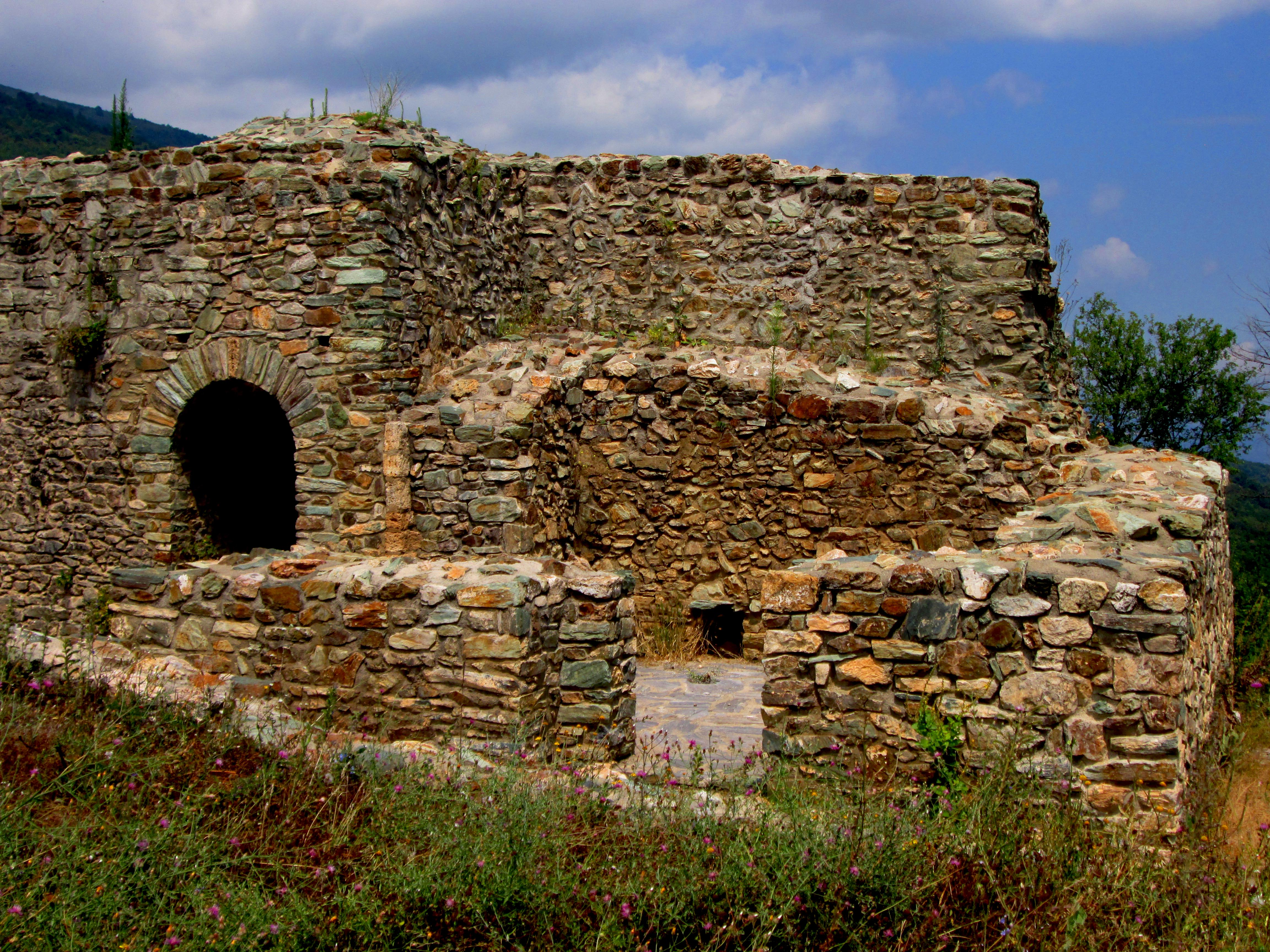
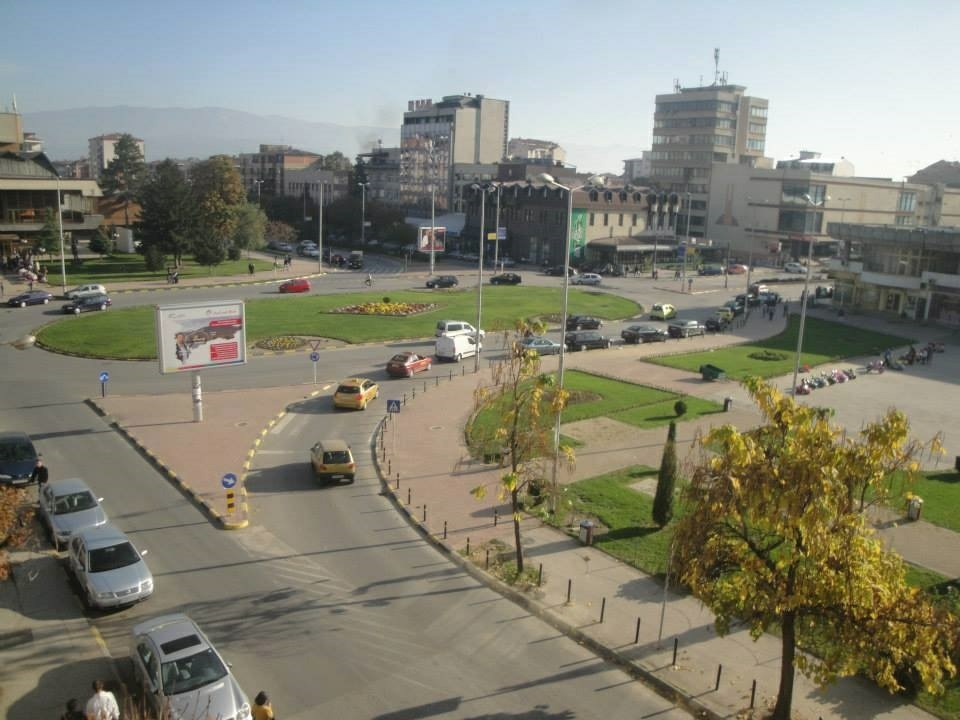
- From top: View over Tetovo, Isa Beg Hammam, Arabati Baba Teḱe, Painted Mosque, Church of St Cyril and Methodius, Popova Šapka, Urban Tetovo, Baltepe Fortress, Tetovo centre.

- Flag Coat of arms

- Location within North Macedonia Tetovo (Europe)
- Coordinates: 42°00′N 20°58′E
- Country: North Macedonia
- Region: Polog
- Municipality: Tetovo

Government
  - Mayor: Bilal Kasami (VLEN)

Area
  - Total: 1,068 km^{2} (412 sq mi)
- Elevation: 468 m (1,535 ft)

Population (2021)
  - Total: 63,176
  - Density: 59.15/km^{2} (153.2/sq mi)
- Demonym(s): (Macedonian: Тетовчанец/Тетовчанка) (Albanian: Tetovar/Tetovare)
- Time zone: UTC+1 (CET)
  - Summer (DST): UTC+2 (CEST)
- Postal code: 1200
- Area code: +389 044
- Vehicle registration: TE
- Climate: Cfb
- Website: tetovo.gov.mk

Tetovo (Macedonian: Тетово, [ˈtɛtɔvɔ]; Albanian: Tetovë, Albanian definite form: Tetova) is a city in the northwestern part of North Macedonia, built on the foothills of Šar Mountain and divided by the Pena River. The municipality of Tetovo covers an area of 1,080 km^{2} (417 sq mi) at 468 meters (1,535 ft) above sea level, with a population of 63,176, making it the country's fifth largest city. The city of Tetovo is the seat of Tetovo Municipality.

Tetovo was founded in the 14th century on the place of the ancient town of Oaeneon, Οαινέον in Greek language.

In the 15th century AD, Tetovo came under Ottoman rule for about five centuries. After its conquest by the Ottomans, most of the city's population converted to Islam and many Ottoman-style structures were built, such as the Šarena Džamija and the Arabati Baba Teḱe, which still stand as two of North Macedonia's most significant landmarks of its Ottoman period. During this period, the town belonged to the Vilayet of Kosovo, became a firearm and cannon foundry, and was renamed Kalkandelen (meaning "Shield Penetrator"); as a result, the town attracted many workers and grew into a city. Following the First and Second World Wars, Tetovo became a part of Yugoslavia and, later, the Republic of Macedonia.

The South East European University, North Macedonia's third biggest university after Skopje and Bitola, is located in Tetovo. Tetovo is also home to the State University of Tetovo. Tetovo is regarded as the de facto capital of North Macedonia's ethnic Albanian population.

== Name ==
The region was referred to as Htetovo in a Serbian Charter. During the Ottoman rule the name of the town was Kalkandelen.

== History ==
=== Roman period ===
The Tabula Imperii Romani places Oaeneum at the town of Tetovo in the Vardar Valley. Christianity spread to Oaeneum during the later period of Roman invasion and reached the region relatively early. St Paul preached the Gospel in the region. In the 2nd to the 4th centuries, the main language to spread the Christian religion was Latin.

=== Middle Ages ===
In the 13th and 14th centuries, Byzantine control was punctuated by periods of Bulgarian and Serbian rule. Konstantin Asen ruled as Tsar of the Bulgarian Empire from 1257 to 1277. Later the region was overrun and taken by Serbian Tsar Stefan Dušan. In a document dated between 1348 and 1353, Dušan restored the Lešok Monastery and gifted the monastery entire Albanian-populated villages, as well as the Nanov Dol highlands. Stefan Dušan also forbade agricultural and livestock activity in the Nanov Dol highlands for state pasture tax collectors, Albanians and Vlachs.

The initial Ottoman occupation did not last as Skanderbeg and his Albanian force with aid from Tetovo, took on the Ottoman forces led by Ibrahim Pasha in the Battle of Polog. Skanderbeg slayed Ibrahim Pasha, who was an old friend of his during his time with the Ottomans. After the battle, Tetovo came under Albanian control. In August 1462, after Skanderbeg defeated Ottoman forces under Hasan Bey in Mokra, Isuf Bey went to move against Skanderbeg. Isuf Bey marched out with 18,000 troops to Skopje, and from there, he marched onto Polog near Tetovo. Skanderbeg attacked and annihilated Isuf's force and the Pasha fled, leaving his army behind to be reduced.

=== Ottoman Period ===
In the 1660s, Evliya Celebi considered the highlands around Tetovo as being the mountains of Arnavutluk (Albania).

During the early 19th century, Abdurrahman Pasha, a prominent Albanian landowner, beautified the city of Tetovo, refurbishing many estates including the notable landmarks such as the Colored Mosque, the Teke and the Baltepe fortress. In the 19th century, the Russian diplomat Ivan Jastrebov spoke highly of Tetovo's climate, liking the mild snowy winters, sunny and comfortably warm summers. The traveler Ami Bue described Tetovo as a very clean city.

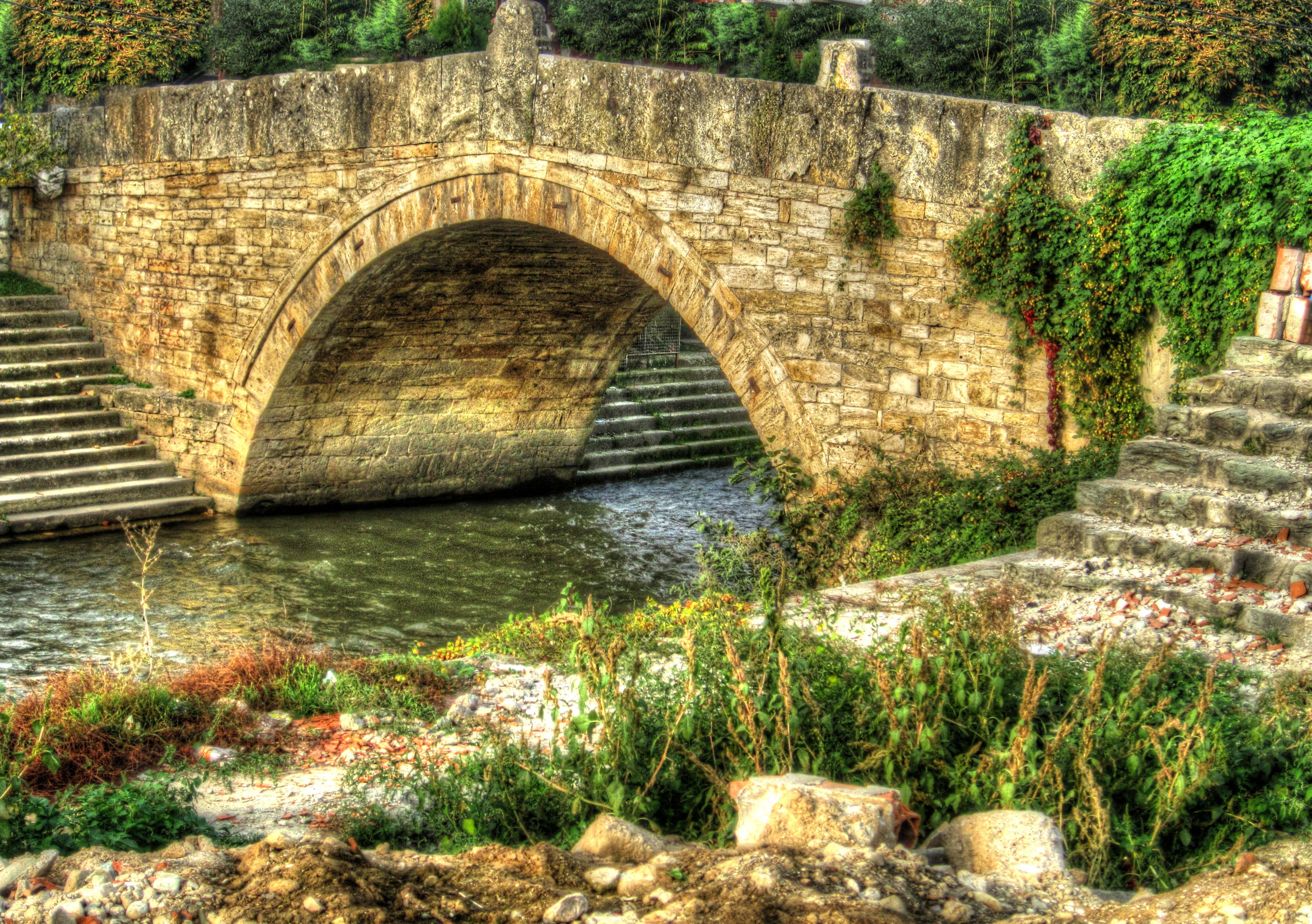
The 'One-Eyed' Bridge, one of Tetovo's remaining stone bridges

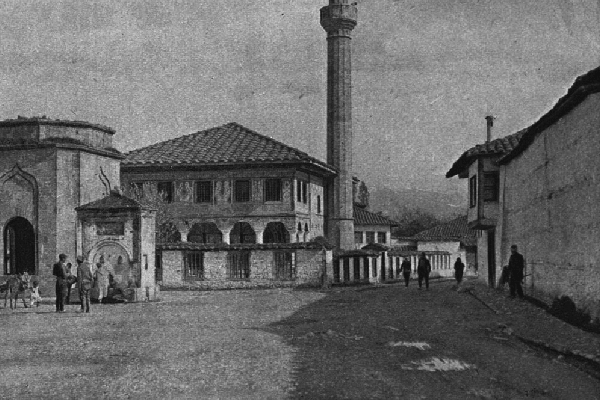
Šarena Džamija, built in the early 15th century

The Tanzimat reforms, initiated by the Ottoman Empire in 1839, sought to modernize and centralize the administration by imposing new taxes and diminishing the power of local feudal magnates, while appointing administrators from Anatolia to oversee the provinces. These changes, however, faced strong opposition, particularly local Albanian pashas. In 1843, the arrest of key Albanian leaders who resisted the reforms triggered an uprising that resulted in the expulsion of Ottoman officials from several major towns. After three weeks of intense fighting, the rebels captured Kalkandelen (modern-day Tetovo), which subsequently became the headquarters of the Albanian Great Council. The Council demanded the annulment of the Tanzimat reforms, challenging the central government's authority. In response, the sultan dispatched Omer Pasha with a force of 30,000 troops to suppress the rebellion. Following a prolonged siege of Kalkandelen, lasting several weeks, the Ottoman forces captured the town, arrested the rebel leaders, and effectively ended the uprising.

Albanian diplomat Mid'hat Frashëri, in his work "Pjesa kombiare" writes that due to the pressure of Turkey, Greece and Serbia, a part of the Albanian population lost their mother tongue. "The people of Gjirokastra speak Greek and in Tetovo and Prizren [they speak] Turkish and Slavic".

=== During the World Wars ===
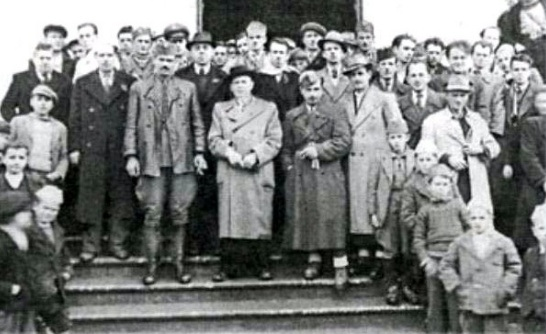
The Albanian National Meeting in the city of Tetovo, 1944(center left, Xhem Hasa and center right, Mefail Shehu)

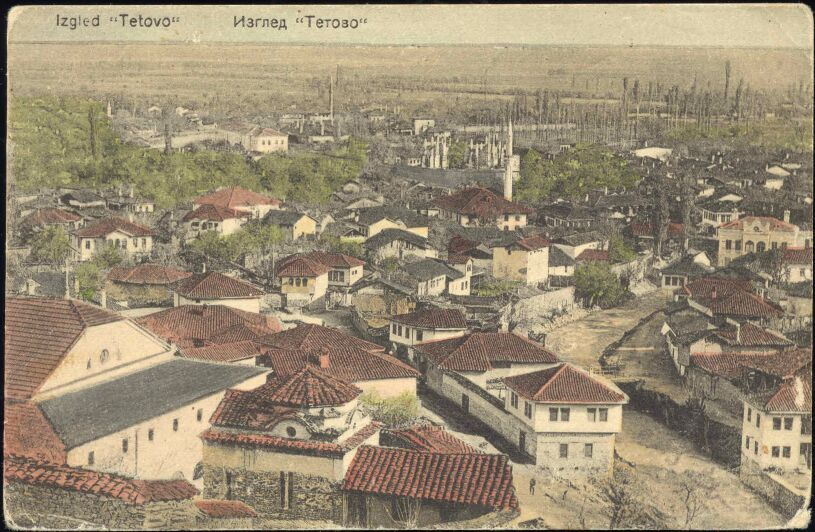
Tetovo 1913, one year after independence from the Ottoman Empire

During the breakup of the Ottoman Empire, Tetovo came under Albanian control by forces led by Hasan Prishtina. From a period between 1913 and 1915, during the Balkan war, the Serbian Army captured Tetovo and the entire region of what is today North Macedonia became known as "South Serbia" as part of the Kingdom of Serbia.

During World War I, a rift occurred between Bulgaria and Serbia. The Bulgarian army started making way through the area and annexed Tetovo and the rest of the region of Macedonia. At the end of the war Serbia regained control of the region. Within the Kingdom of Yugoslavia, Tetovo was part of the Vardar Banovina from 1929 to 1941.

In 1941, the Vardar Banovina ceased to exist as a result of the Axis occupation of Yugoslavia. The western region, predominantly inhabited by Albanians, was incorporated into the Italian-protected Kingdom of Albania, resulting in Tetovo once again coming under Albanian control. The Italian military intelligence service, OVRA, established the "Ljuboten Battalion" in Tetovo, composed primarily of ethnic Albanians from the region. The unit was tasked with identifying, interrogating, and neutralizing any resistance to the Italian occupation. Following Italy's surrender on September 8, 1943, the German forces retained control over the battalion, permitting its members to retain their Italian-issued uniforms and weapons. Subsequently, members of the Balli Kombëtar, an Albanian nationalist group, joined the battalion, further strengthening its ranks.

The Balli Kombëtar ruled Tetovo with military and financial aid from the Axis powers. The Albanian national flag was raised in Tetovo, the Albanian Franc was introduced as the official currency as well as the official language and education facilities in Albanian.

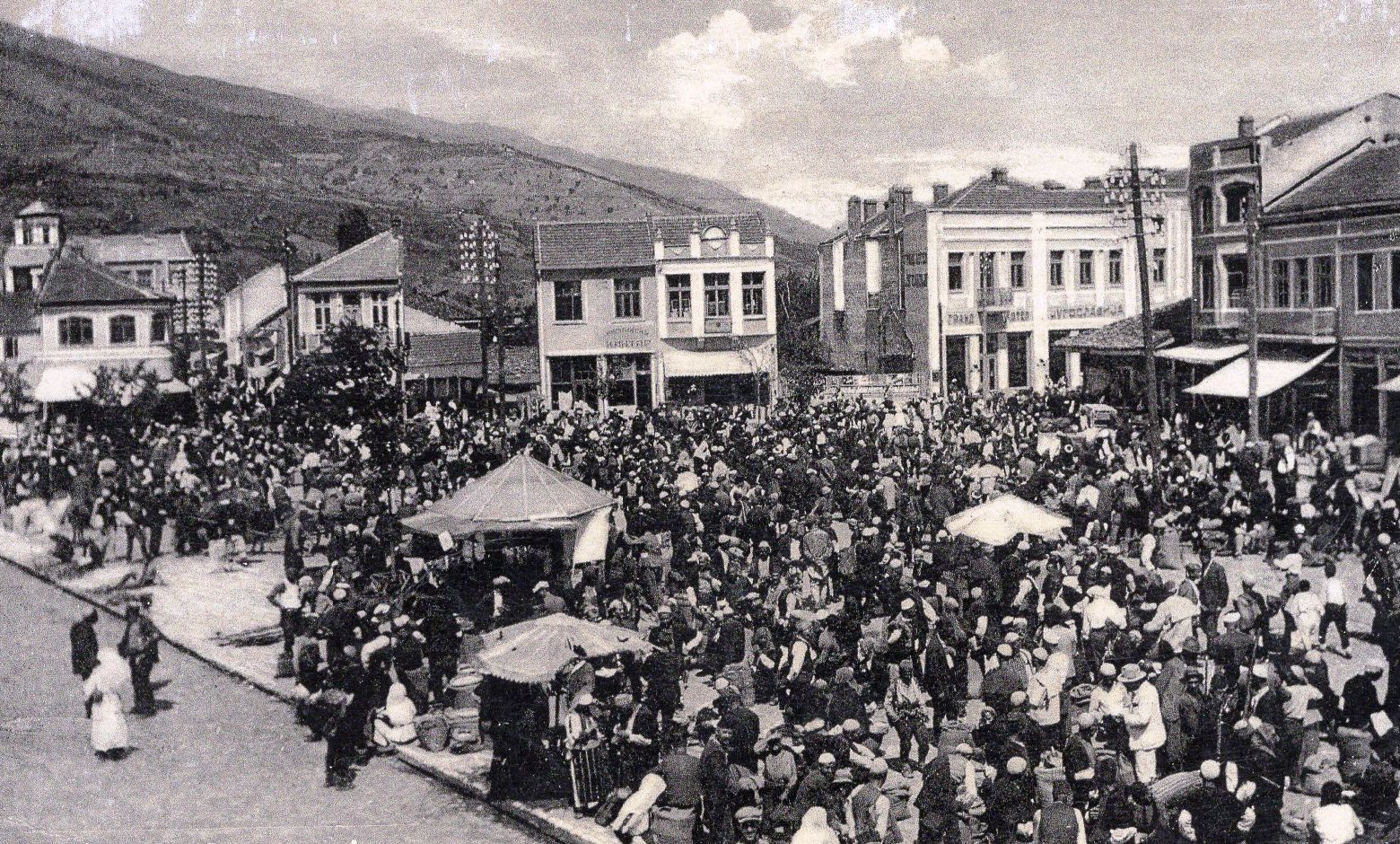
Tetovo Gorna Čaršija

Against the background of a large-scale offensive operations of the Bulgarian army aimed at Niš, Skopje and Prishtina, the city was the last to be seized by the Macedonian partisans on November 19, 1944. Several Macedonian partisan shock brigades fought for control of the city with German forces and the Balli Kombëtar. Part of the fighters were ethnic Macedonians that split from ELAS to form the First Macedonian Shock Brigade. According to Macedonian veterans from the 8th Veles Shock Brigade who participated in the fighting, the operation in Tetovo was well-planned and the enemy resistance was weakened due to the inevitability of the German defeat and the good organization and equipment of the partisans.

After the Germans had been driven out, the communist authorities ordered the collection of weapons but this order was not well received. In Tetovo, the remaining Ballists tried to retain their control after the Yugoslav Partisans announced victory. As result an armed uprising of massive proportions broke in the area led by the Balli Kombëtar, which aimed to resist the incorporation of the region into communist Yugoslavia. It was only in July 1945 that the Yugoslav Partisans were able to push down the uprising and re-establish their control.

=== SFR Yugoslavia ===
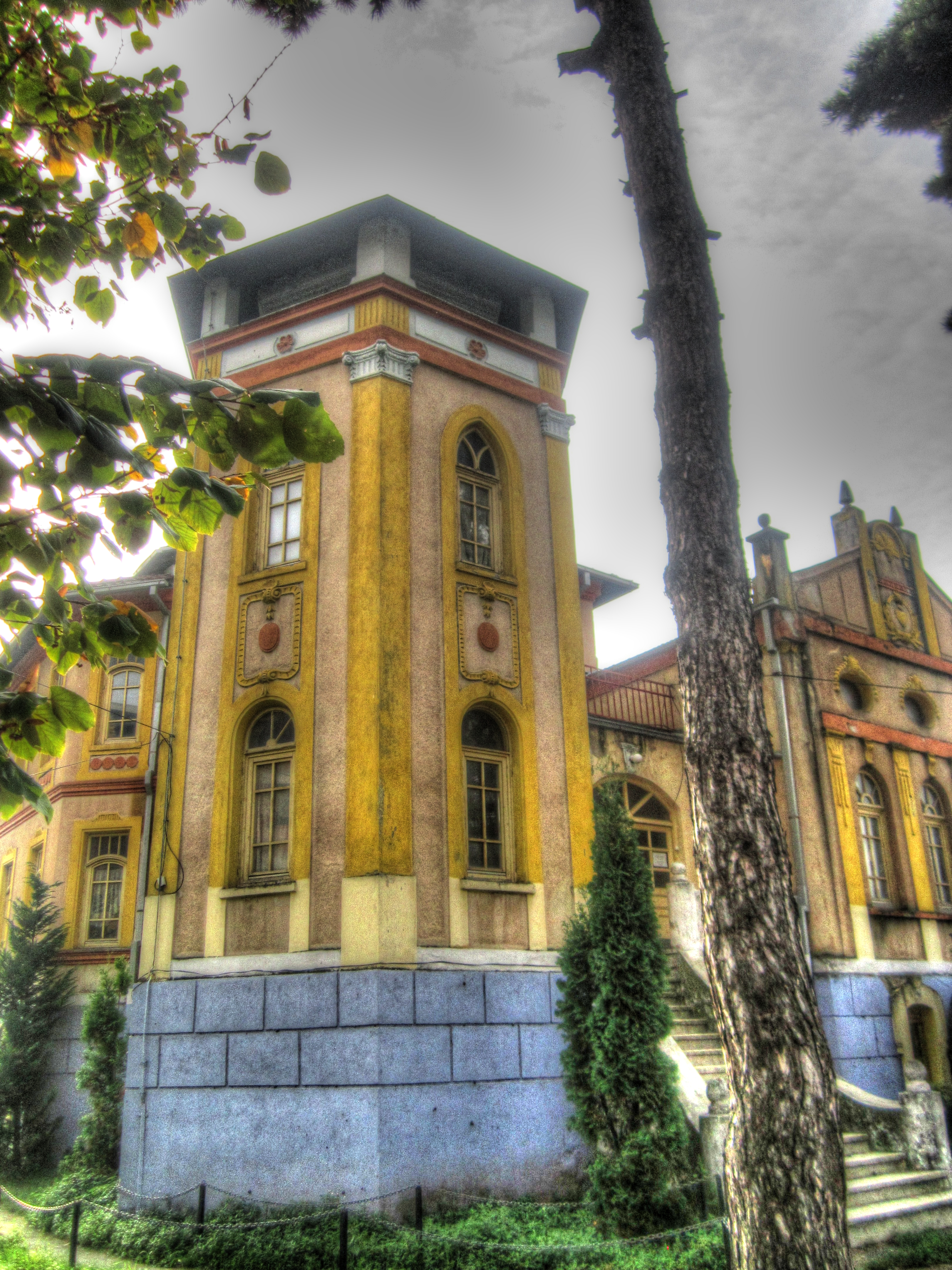
The house of Halim Bey Dëralla. Confiscated under the socialist Yugoslav regime and turned into a healthcare facility

The town was consolidated into the Socialist Republic of Macedonia. The early years of Socialist Yugoslavia were turbulent for Tetovo's Albanian population, as many were subjected to repression, causing them to emigrate. Those who remained demonstrated periodically but violently against the socialist Yugoslav regime, notably in the Yucel Incident of 1957 and the Tetovo Incident of 1968. Many of these protests were led by Mehmet Gega, a notable Albanian rights activist who was sentenced to ten years in prison.

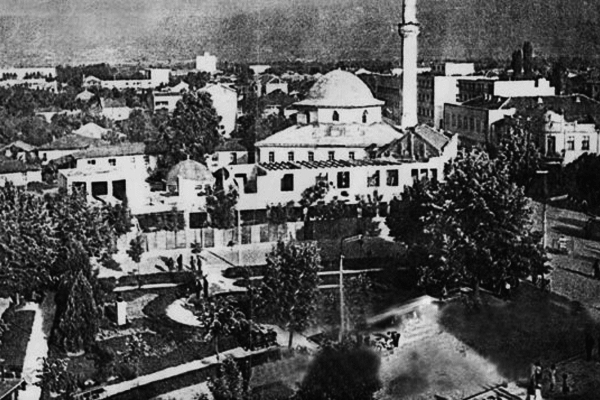
Tetovo's Old Mosque, demolished during socialist Yugoslavia

Tetovo under Josip Broz Tito's Yugoslavia went through major changes. Many Yugoslav Brutalist styled apartments were built around the city centre of Tetovo as well as concrete roads. New suburbs such as the Hajdučka suburb were formed to help accommodate the rising number of Macedonians moving to the city. Some of the city's historic buildings, such as the Old Mosque, were demolished by the authorities.

=== Breakup of Yugoslavia ===
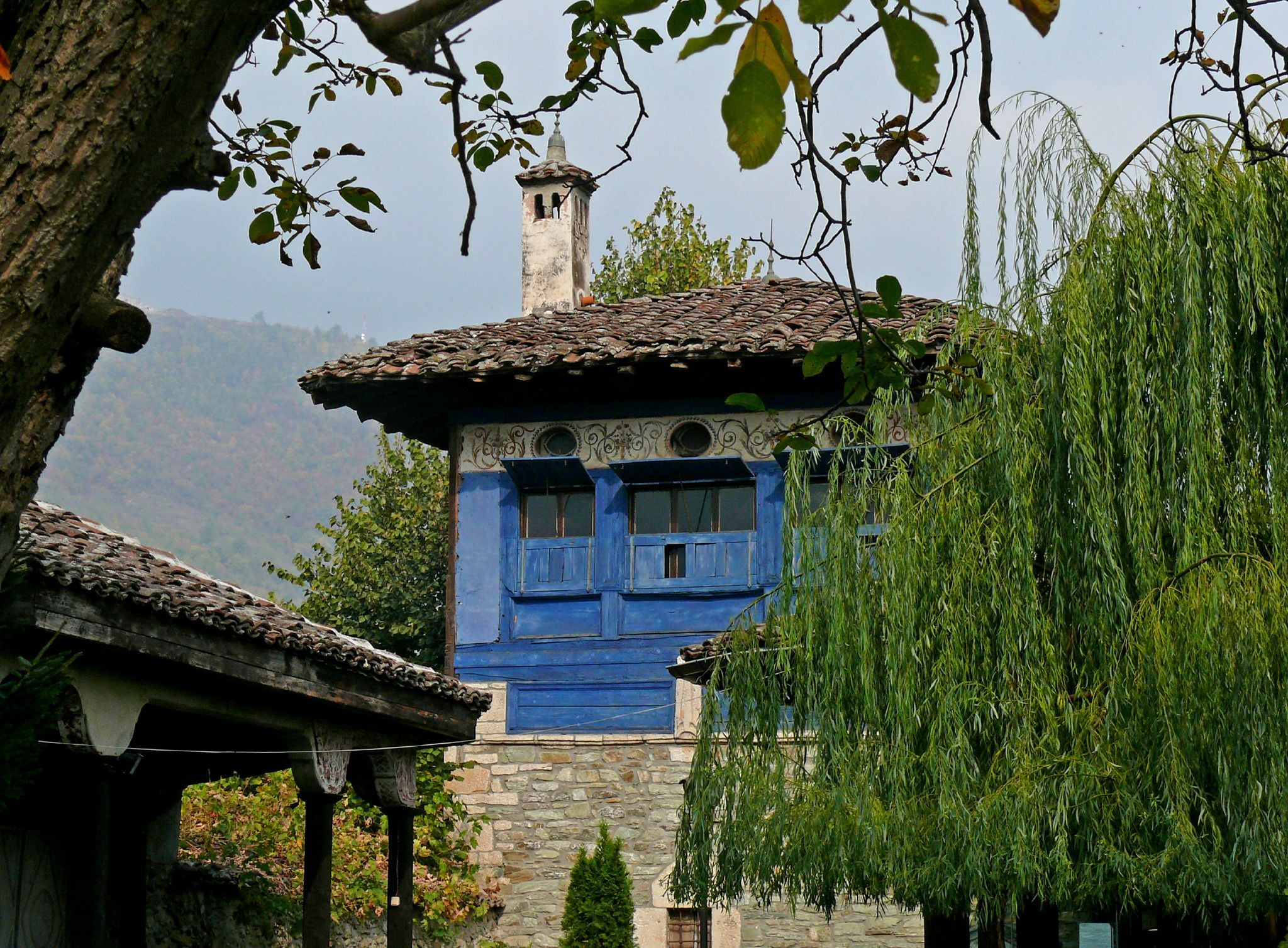
The Bektashi Teḱe, Arabati Baba Teḱe

Tetovo, along with the city of Gostivar, took in and sheltered several thousands of Bosnian Muslim refugees from 1992 until the end of the Bosnian war.

In 1997, Alajdin Demiri, the mayor of Tetovo, was jailed for raising the double headed eagle flag of Albania from Tetovo's town hall, and by 2000 the outbreak of hostilities in Tanuševci had spilled into the towns of Tetovo and Gostivar. In 2001, ethnic Albanians launched an insurgency, with Tetovo being the main backdrop of the war. After the signing of the Ohrid Agreement, fighting ceased and peace returned to the city, lasting to the present day.

=== Present day ===
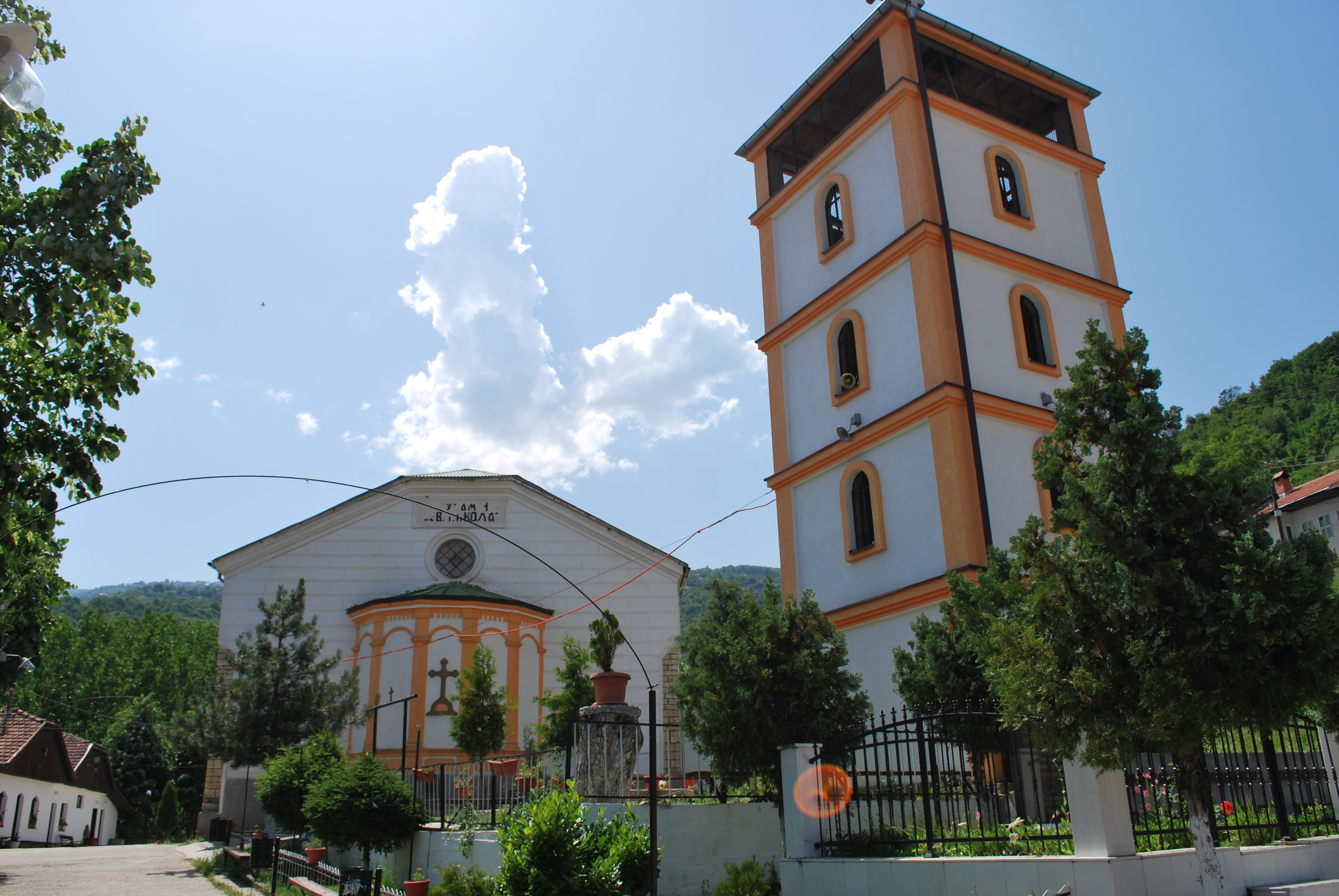
Church of St. Nicholas in Tetovo

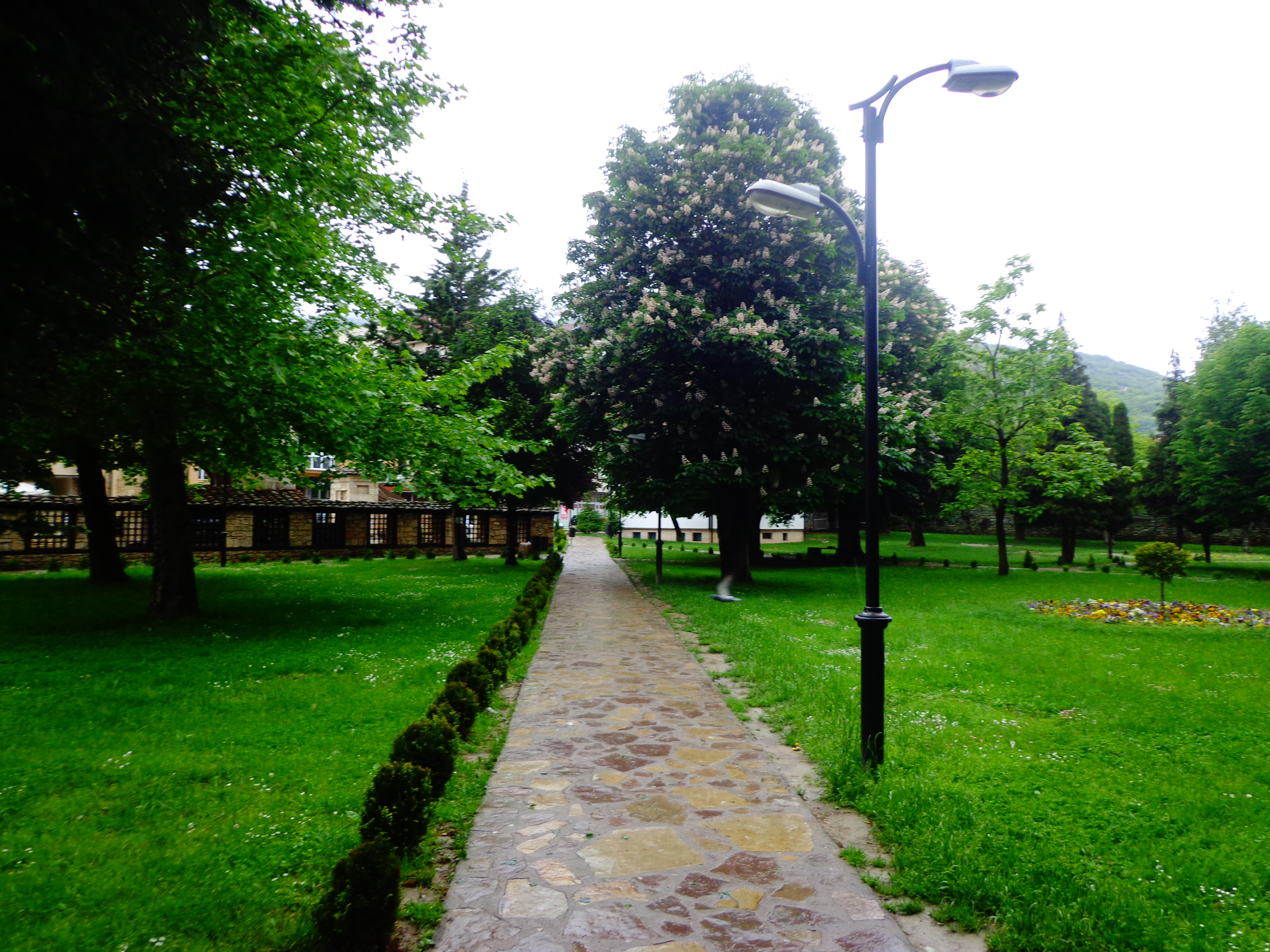
Šarena Džamija Park

In economic terms, Tetovo is one of the most developing cities in North Macedonia with some multinational companies (Ecolog International, Mercure Tetovo, Renova, Kipper) being located in this town. Despite the interest of private companies in Tetovo, the city is often neglected by the government. Tetovo suffers from urban sprawl, and due to the lack of government regulations, the city has no system for building permits, and many houses and buildings have been built unsafely and randomly along footpaths, roads and in parks. Its air pollution levels are among the highest in Europe.

The tallest building in the city is Mercure Tetovo measuring about 80 meters in height.

Tetovo is one of the main educational centres in North Macedonia, hosting two universities: the South East European University (Public Private Non-profitable) and the State University of Tetovo (Public University). The first of the two has educational leadership in the region, whereas the Bologna Process is applicable since its establishment, has the best campus in the region of South East Europe and is trend with international developments in education. More than 20,000 students get their education and degrees in Tetovo.

In addition, Tetovo is a centre of ethnic Albanian politics. Most Albanian political parties on North Macedonia (Democratic Party of Albanians (DPA), Democratic Union for Integration (DUI) and the Party for Democratic Prosperity (PDP)) have their main seats there.

Tetovo has one of the highest crime rates in North Macedonia, second only to the much larger capital Skopje. The city was home to 1,229 criminal acts in the first half of 2009.

On September 8, 2021, at least fourteen people were killed in a fire at a COVID-19 center in the town's general hospital.

== Culture ==
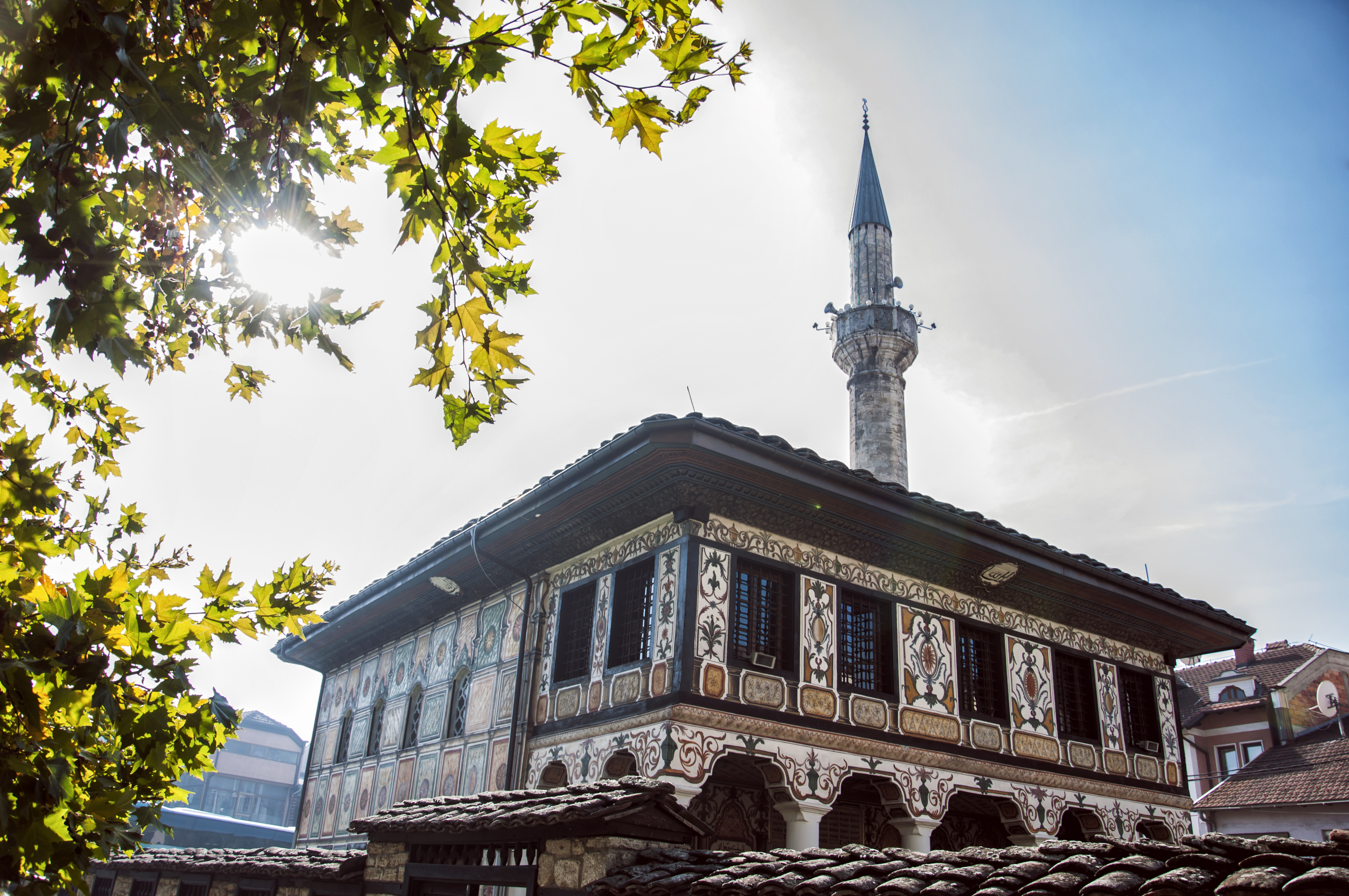
The Painted Mosque.

Tetovo has been under many different empires; from the Mycenae and Illyrians, to the Romans, Byzantines and Ottomans, giving the city a vast range of diverse cultures. The museum of Tetovo, established in 1950, contains the history of the town of Tetovo and is situated in the Memorial House of the Central Committee of the Communist Party of Macedonia.

=== Landmarks ===
The Municipality of Tetovo is home to 15 sites designated as Cultural Heritage by the Ministry of Culture, of which 14 are located within Tetovo's city limits. Nine of these are historic homes.

The main attractions of Tetovo are its historic areas and structures. The Šarena Džamija ("Painted Mosque") is located near the Pena River in the old part of the town. The mosque was built in 1438 and rebuilt in 1833 by Abdurrahman Pasha, the son of Rexhep Pasha. It is one of the most important cultural and historical structures of Tetovo and represents the style of early Ottoman architecture. The painted mosque continues to be an important monument to the residents of Tetovo, and is the town's main tourist attraction for many foreign visitors.

Sitting directly across the Pena River from the Šarena Mosque is Tetovo's Ottoman-era hamam, known as the Čifte Hamam, or Bey's Hamam. It was built in the late 15th/early 16th century. Declared a monument of cultural heritage, it houses the Tetovo Art Gallery. The building was renovated between 2012 and 2015.

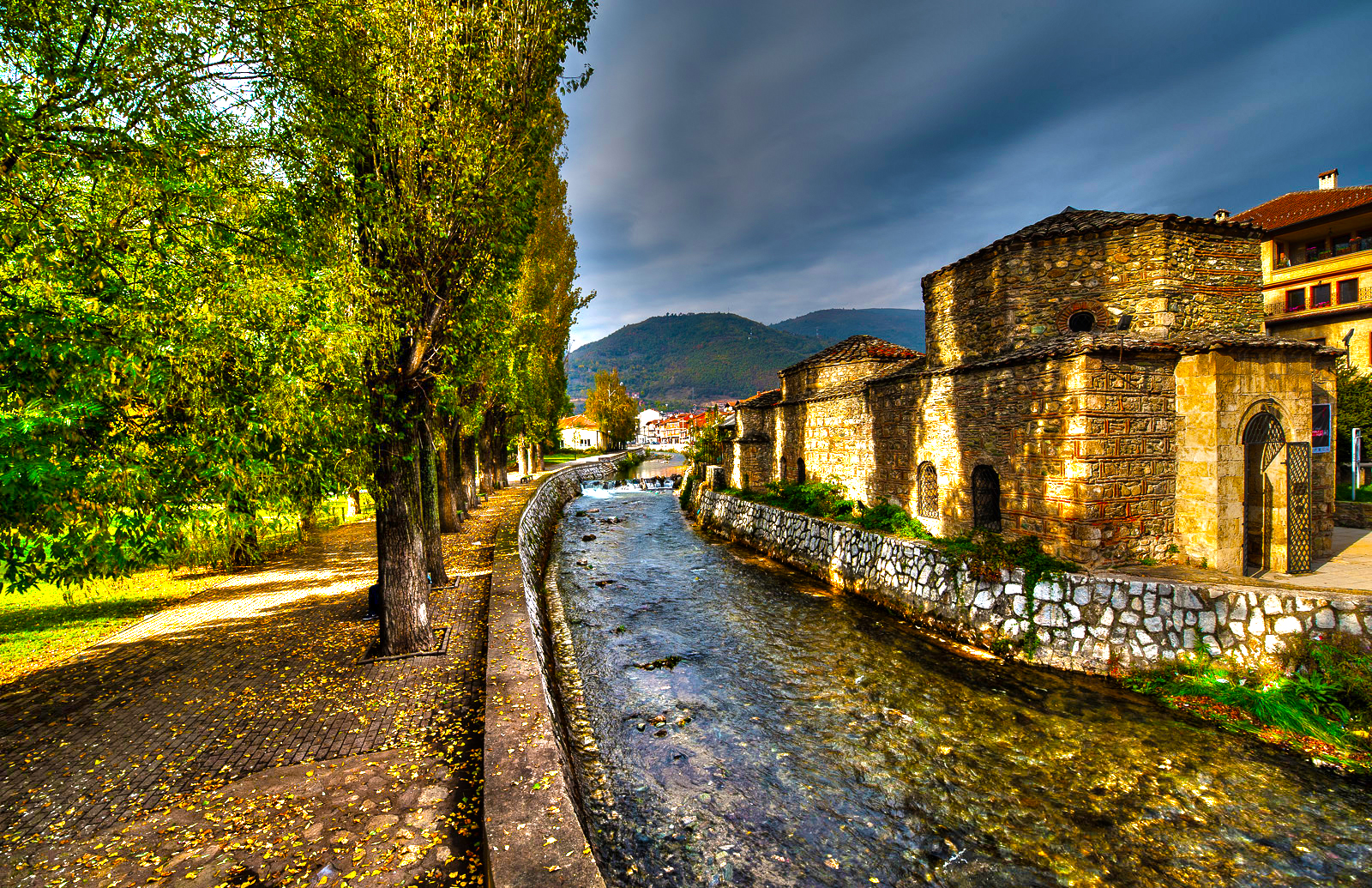
The Čifte Hamam next to the Pena River in Tetovo

The Tetovo Fortress, located on the top of the Baltepe Hill, above Tetovo, was built in 1820 by Abdurrahman Pasha.

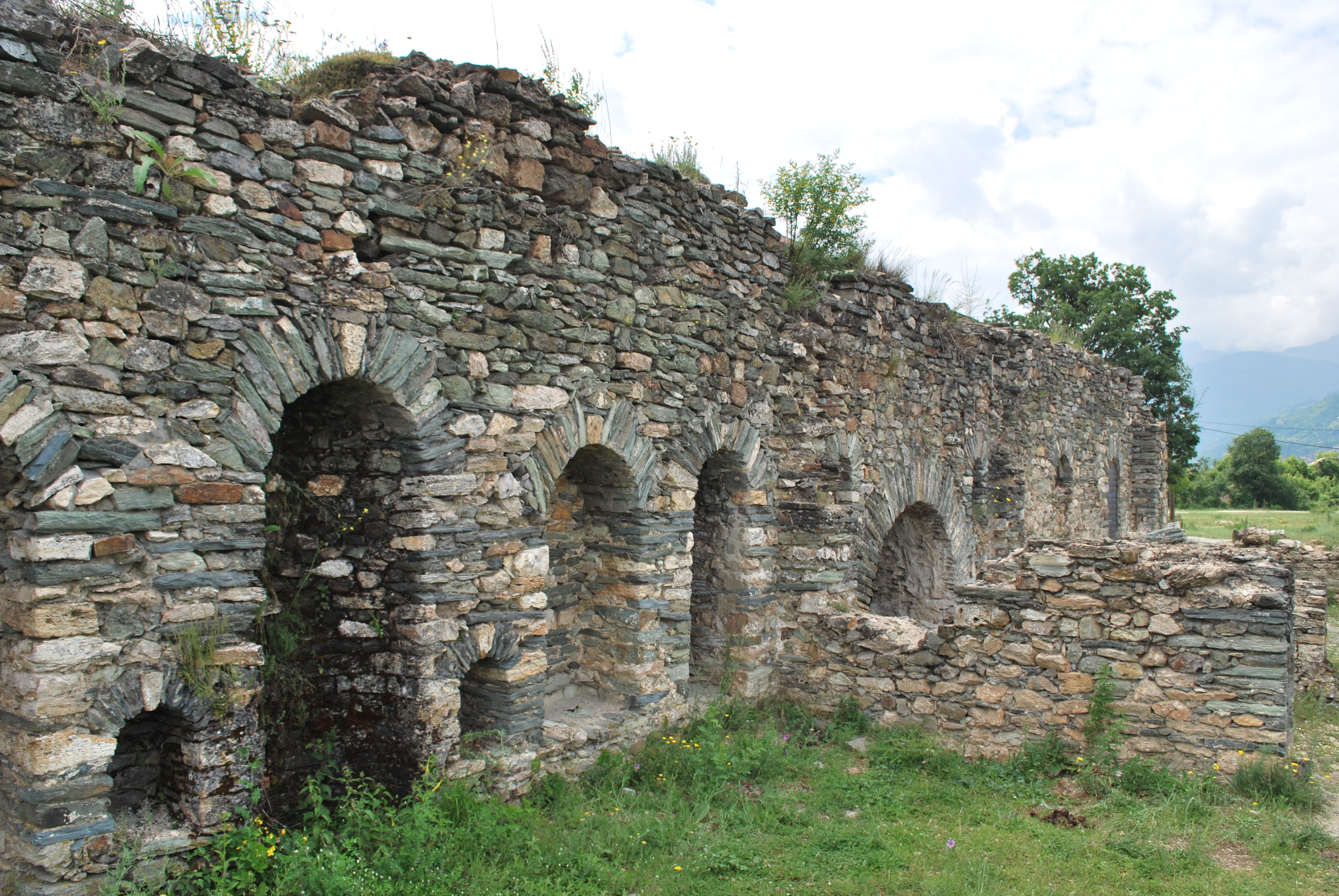
The Baltepe Fortress

The Arabati Baba Teḱe originally built in 1538 around the türbe of Sersem Ali Baba, an Ottoman dervish. In 1799, a waqf provided by Rexhep Pasha established the current grounds of the tekke. The finest surviving Bektashi monastery in Europe, the sprawling complex features flowered lawns, prayer rooms, dining halls, lodgings and a great marble fountain inside a wooden pavilion.

The Alim Bey House is an historic estate in Tetovo. Along with the Saraj in Resen, it is among the more prominent examples of lodgings built by wealthy Ottoman pashas and beys in North Macedonia that were constructed in Western-inspired architecture. The Alim Bey House is an asymmetrical estate built in a neo-Baroque style with decorated façades, ornate friezes, and the use of various geometric shapes including a hexagonal tower. The three-story home is a protected monument of cultural heritage. The building functioned as a hospital until 1993. Renovation works funded by Ministry of Culture of the Republic of Macedonia occurred in 2016.

The Museum of the Tetovo Region is housed within the historic Goce Stojčevski house. The museum was established in 1950, originally situated in the Arabati Baba Tekke complex. It contains various archaeological, ethnological, historical, and art exhibits. The house is where Macedonian partisan Goce Stojčevski - Ambarče was born in 1919.

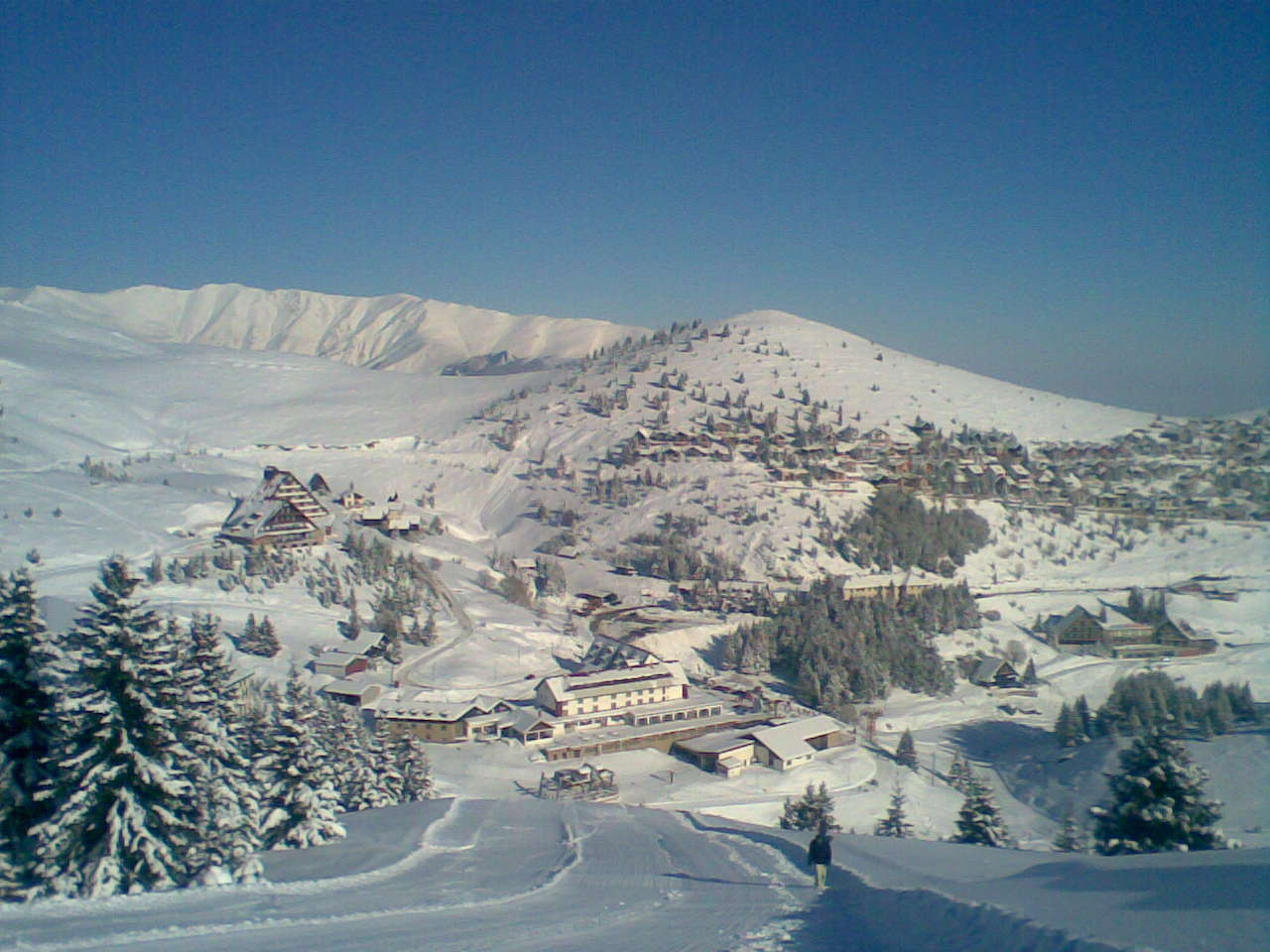
Popova Šapka Ski Resort

An example of Byzantine culture outside of Tetovo Municipality is the Monastery of Lešok. The monastery is located 8 km (5 mi) northeast of Tetovo. In its complex are the churches of St. Athanasius of Alexandria and the Church of the Holy Mother of God. The Church of the Holy Virgin, built in 1326, is an excellent example of Byzantine style and architectural tradition.

Popova Šapka is a ski resort located in the Šar Mountains. Despite being around seven kilometres (4.3 miles) from the city area, it is generally associated with Tetovo. Popova Šapka attracts many tourists in winter due it being one of the more popular ski resorts in the former Yugoslavia. Aside from hosting recreational and competitive skiing competitions, Popova Šapka has many villas and restaurants to accommodate visitors. The rise in hotels was because the cable car that took people from Tetovo to Popova Šapka was destroyed during the 2001 Macedonia insurgency. Therefore, people stay at Popova Šapka overnight before returning to Tetovo.

There are three stone bridges in Tetovo and each cross the Pena river; one of these, which connects the Goce Stojčeski Street one block downstream of the Šarena Mosque, is listed as an Object of Cultural Heritage. The bridges are some of the oldest structures in Tetovo. Most of the old heritage buildings are situated in the old town, near the centre of Tetovo. Tetovo has many old buildings and monuments however, they are endangered of being demolished by people building unpermitted buildings

=== Cuisine ===
Tetovo is where the Tavče Gravče dish originates. In Albanian, it is also known as Tavë me Groshë. During Socialist Yugoslavia, the dish was known around the country as Tetovsko Gravče, in reference to the city of Tetovo, where the dish comes from. Although different varieties of the meal are made throughout the Balkans, the traditional Tetovo tavče gravče is cooked and served in a terracotta pot.

Most cuisines in Tetovo have a strong Ottoman influence or foundation such as Ajvar, Sujuk and Gevrek. Tetovo is known for its barbecue restaurants, Qebaptorë, where Ćevapi and Pljeskavica (including the Shar Pljeskavica" (Šarska pljeskavica), stuffed with kashkaval cheese). Byrektorës, pastry restaurants, are also common in Tetovo and produce Burek, while Ëmbëltore, which are sweet shops, produce locally made traditional sweets such as Lukum, Tulumba, Kataif and Baklava. Boza is also fermented in Tetovo and is a commonly consumed beverage.

The cuisines in Tetovo have a unique taste and flavour due to the local agricultural products used to make the cuisines. In North Macedonia, the Tetovo variety of Kashkaval cheese is the most popular as it is made naturally from sheep's milk in the Šar Mountains. During the Yugoslav period, apples from Tetovo were popular in Belgrade and were known as Tetovski Jabuka.

Albanians from the Macedonian region of Polog, a conurbation of villages between Tetovo and Gostivar, specialised in confectionary, ice-cream and general hospitality businesses like cafes and grills around Yugoslavia. It was even stereotyped in Yugoslavia.

== Sports ==
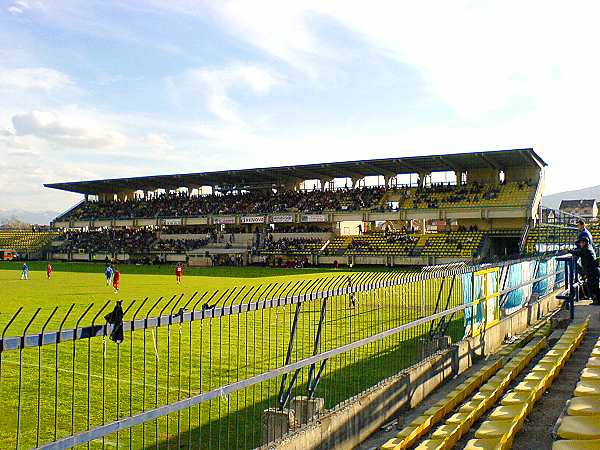
Ecolog Arena

The most popular sport in Tetovo is football. Tetovo is represented by four clubs, of which three play in the Macedonian First League.

- KF Shkëndija, supported by the majority of Albanians living in Tetovo.
- FK Renova, mainly supported by Albanians but has significant Macedonian support, and are based in Džepčište.
- FK Teteks is the team supported by the Macedonians living in Tetovo.

FK Drita currently play in the Treta Liga (Third League), based in the village of Bogovinje, while FK Vrapčište, who also play in the Third League, play their home games in the village stadium of Vrapčište.

Wrestling, karate and volleyball are also fairly popular sports in Tetovo. Few volleyball teams are active in the volleyball league of North Macedonia: Škendija, Bami Kor Medika, etc.

== Demographics ==
Historical population
Year	Pop.	±% p.a.
1948	17,259	—
1953	20,209	+3.21%
1961	25,357	+2.88%
1971	35,745	+3.49%
1981	46,523	+2.67%
1994	50,344	+0.61%
2002	52,915	+0.62%
2021	63,176	+0.94%

Between the years 1348-1353, Albanians are mentioned by Serbian Tsar Stefan Dušan as farmers and soldiers in the district of Tetovo.

Ottoman statistics from 1452 for the nahiya of Tetovo recorded 146 Christian and 60 Muslim households. In 1453, the population consisted of 153 Christian and 56 Muslim families. The 1455 defter recorded Albanian presence. The 1467 Ottoman defter records of Tetovo attests that the Muslim neighborhood of Tetovo was inhabited by 6 heads of families with mixed anthroponyms of Islamic Albanian character, while the Christian quarter of Tetovo was characterized with Slavic-Christian and Albanian-Christian names, with some cases of Slavicisation.

In 1468, Tetovo had 180 Christian and 41 Muslim families. In 1545 there were 99 Christian and 101 Muslim families (38 were islamicised) in Tetovo, and in 1568 there were 108 Christian and 329 Muslim (184 islamicised).

By the 19th century, the population of Tetovo began to increase with settlement from the surrounding villages. The French traveler Ami Boué described the inhabitants as "Bulgarians, Muslims and Albanians", living in Turkish and Slavic quarters. He estimated the population around 4,000–5,000 and noted that about half were "Serbs" and "Greek Christians". In 1854, Boué estimated the total population of the Pashalik of Tetovo was 30,000–40,000 and consisted of Bulgarians and Serbs of "Greek religion" i.e. Eastern Orthodoxy, and of Albanians who were Muslims.

According to the statistics of the Bulgarian ethnographer Vasil Kanchov, in 1900 the population of Tetovo was 19,200, consisting of 8,500 Bulgarians, 9,000 Turks, 500 Arnauts and 1,200 Romani. Kanchov wrote that many Albanians declared themselves as Turks. In Tetovo the population that declared itself Turkish "was of Albanian blood", but it "had been Turkified after the Ottoman invasion, including Skanderbeg", referring to Islamization.

In 1916, under the Kingdom of Bulgaria, the Bulgarian registries had recorded that Tetovo had a population of 22,000. Two-thirds of this population was listed as Albanian and one-third consisted of Bulgarians (most of them with Serbian national feeling, labeled as Serbomans).

According to the 1942 Albanian census, Tetovo was inhabited by 10,252 Muslim Albanians, 3,496 Bulgarians and 2,136 Serbs.

As of 2021, the city of Tetovo has 63,176 inhabitants and the ethnic composition was the following:

- Albanians – 41,356 (65.5%)
- Macedonians – 14,116 (22.3%)
- Persons for whom data are taken from administrative sources - 3,326 (5.3%)
- Roma – 1,877 (3.0%)
- Turks – 1,745 (2.8%)
- Serbs – 248 (0.4%)
- Bosniaks – 188 (0.3%)
- others – 290 (0.5%)

City of Tetovo population according to ethnic group 1948–2021
Ethnic group	census 1948		census 1953		census 1961		census 1971		census 1981		census 1994		census 2002		census 2021	
Ethnic group	Number	%	Number	%	Number	%	Number	%	Number	%	Number	%	Number	%	Number	%
Albanians	..	..	7,155	35.4	6,435	25.4	15,388	43.1	21,741	46.7	25,128	49.9	28,897	54.7	41,356	65.5
Macedonians	..	..	7,575	37.5	11,631	45,9	14,415	40.3	17,817	38.3	19,439	38.6	18,555	35.1	14,116	22.3
Turks	..	..	4,470	22.1	5,864	23.1	3,543	9.9	2,757	5.9	2,073	4.1	1,878	3.6	1,745	2.8
Romani	..	..	227	1.1	0	0.0	823	2.3	1,709	3.7	2,260	4.5	2,352	4.5	1,877	3.0
Vlachs	..	..	11	0.1	0	0.0	0	0.0	4	0.0	18	0.0	13	0.0	10	0.0
Serbs	..	..	481	2.4	839	3.3	920	2.6	877	1.9	830	1.7	587	1.1	248	0.4
Bosniaks	..	..	0	0.0	0	0.0	0	0.0	0	0.0	0	0.0	156	0.3	188	0.3
Others	..	..	290	1.4	588	2.3	656	1.8	1,618	3.5	596	1.2	477	0.9	290	0.5
PWDTFAS*															3,326	5.3
Total	17,132		20,209		25,357		35,745		46,523		50,344		52,915		63,176	

- PWDTFAS-Persons for whom data are taken from administrative sources

== Notable people from Tetovo ==
=== Honorary citizens ===
- Blerim Dzemaili
- Tanja Fajon
- Ramush Haradinaj
- Ismail Kadare
- Stjepan Mesić
- Ferid Murad

== International relations ==
=== Twin towns – Sister cities ===
Tetovo is twinned with:

- Prizren, Kosovo
- Kukës, Albania
- Sterling Heights, Michigan, United States
- Konya, Turkey
- Dorog, Hungary

== See also ==
- Gymnasium Kiril Pejčinoviḱ
- Polog Statistical Region
- Tetovo Municipality
