= Iljaz Halimi =

Macedonian politician (born 1954)

Iljaz Halimi (born 7 February 1954) is a Macedoniann politician. He is part of the Democratic Party of Albanians.

== Biography ==
Halimi was born in Sushike, Štrpce. He graduated from the University of Pristina, worked at the Gymnasium Kiril Pejčinoviḱ in Tetovo as a teacher of sociology and philosophy, then he was the deputy director of that institution.

Halimi was one of the founders of the Democratic Party of Albanians in which he became vice-president. He served for several terms in the Assembly of the Republic of Macedonia, and in 1998–2002 he served as deputy speaker of the parliament. Until 2008 he was deputy minister of defence, then worked in the administration of the Tetovo municipality. In 2014, he ran for the office of president of Macedonia in the presidential elections. He won 4.49% of the vote, which translated into 3rd place.
