= Gymnasium Kiril Pejčinoviḱ =

MSS Gymnasium "Kiril Pejčinoviḱ"
- Tetovo; North Macedonia

Information
- Type: Public secondary school
- Established: 1947
- Principal: Teuta Lalla
- Grades: 1 – 4 year
- Enrollment: 2000
- Color: Blue
- Nickname: Gjimnazi i Tetovës

Gymnasium Kiril Pejčinoviḱ" (in Macedonian: СОУ Гимназија „Кирил Пејчиновиќ“, Albanian: Gjimnazi „Kiril Pejçinoviq“) is a gymnasium in Tetovo, North Macedonia. It was established in 1947 and named after the enlightener Kiril Pejčinoviḱ.
