= Young Democratic-Progressive Party =

The Young Democratic-Progressive Party of Macedonia (Macedonian: Млада демократско-прогресивна странка на Македонија, Mlada demokratsko-progresivna stranka na Makedonija, MDSM) was a political party in Macedonia led by Risto Ivanov.

== History ==
The party was founded on 1 July 1990, as a successor party to the League of Socialist Youth of Macedonia. Previously, at its 13th Congress, the organisation expressed its political interest in forming a new political party that would operate in continuity with its previous political positions and commitments. On 3 October 1990, it promoted its political program and slogan: "Together, for the happiness and satisfaction of every individual". Regarding the issue of Macedonia's independence, MDSM advocates for: a free, prosperous Macedonia in an equal Yugoslav, Balkan and European community, which clearly indicates that this party did not have a clearly defined position regarding independence. Regarding the future of Yugoslavia, MDSM promotes the idea of a "third Yugoslavia", as a community of free and sovereign peoples and equal republics that contractually determine the foundations and conditions for living together.

In the first multi-party elections in 1990, MDSM ran in coalition with the Union of Reform Forces of Macedonia, winning 6 parliamentary seats. In other areas, it ran with the Socialist Party, winning one seat.

On 28 June 1991, the party decided to merge with the Union of Reform Forces, under the new name Union of Reform Forces of Macedonia - Liberal Party, eventually forming the Liberal Party in 1993.
