= Felipe II =

Felipe II is the name of two Spanish kings who ruled also over Portugal:

- Philip II of Spain (I of Portugal)
- Philip II of Portugal (III of Spain)

== See also ==
- Philip II (disambiguation)
