= COVID-19 pandemic in North Macedonia =

Aspect of viral disease pandemic

- Disease: COVID-19
- Pathogen: SARS-CoV-2
- Location: North Macedonia
- First outbreak: Wuhan, Hubei, China via Italy
- Index case: Skopje
- Arrival date: 26 February 2020 (6 years, 6 months and 2 weeks)
- Confirmed cases: 341,404
- Active cases: 1,032
- Recovered: 330,866
- Deaths: 9,506
- Fatality rate: 2.78%

Government website
- koronavirus.gov.mk

The COVID-19 pandemic in North Macedonia was a part of the ongoing COVID-19 pandemic of COVID-19 caused by SARS-CoV-2. The virus was confirmed to have reached North Macedonia in February 2020. The initial contagion in the country was mainly connected with the COVID-19 pandemic in Italy as there are circa 70,000 residents of Italy from North Macedonia and resulted in many people returning to North Macedonia, bringing the virus with them. As of 9 July, over 7,000 cases have been confirmed in the country, due to its second wave caused by family reunions during Eid al-Fitr among the Muslim minority and the overall re-opening of the country to organize the parliamentary elections.

== Background ==
On 12 January 2020, the World Health Organization (WHO) confirmed that a novel coronavirus was the cause of a respiratory illness in a cluster of people in Wuhan City, Hubei Province, China, which was reported to the WHO on 31 December 2019.

The case-fatality ratio for COVID-19 has been much lower than SARS of 2003, but the transmission has been significantly higher, with a significant total death toll.

== Timeline with all events ==
=== February 2020 ===
On 26 February, North Macedonia confirmed its first case of SARS-CoV-2, a 50-year-old woman that got tested at the Clinic for Infectious Diseases in Skopje. She had been in Italy for a month and was sick for two weeks. Upon returning to North Macedonia, she immediately reported herself to the clinic. This case was isolated and didn't lead to further infections.

=== March 2020 ===
On 6 March, two more cases were confirmed positive: a married couple from Balanci, Centar Župa, who were residents of Brescia, Italy, and presumably returned to the country out of fear of the virus. They entered North Macedonia on 27 February and went to the clinic in Debar on 2 March. They were not initially tested for SARS-CoV-2, but when their symptoms were getting worse, they were tested on 6 March. After getting positive results, the couple was transferred to the Clinic in Skopje to be taken care of.

On 9 March the number of infected people in the country increased to 7 - three family members of the cases registered on 6 March and Nina Caca Biljanovska, the director of the Clinic for Skin Diseases in Skopje. Biljanovska's incident caused controversy, as she did not self-isolate after returning from a vacation in Italy. Moreover, she had continued going to work and was a speaker at a conference attended by 100 people before getting tested. The Minister of Health subsequently fired her.

On 10 March, after a formal request from the mayor of Debar (the city where 5 of the 7 cases were found) and the controversies regarding Biljanovska the Ministry of Health of North Macedonia implemented more reliable measures to prevent further spreading of the virus, including temporary two-week closure of all education institutes (from kindergartens to universities), the prohibition of travelling to the most infected countries (China, Korea, Italy, France, Germany, etc.), the ban of all public events and closure of sports events to the public. Later that day, the first case was confirmed to tested negatively on the repeated coronavirus test. The patient, however, is still recovering in the hospital.

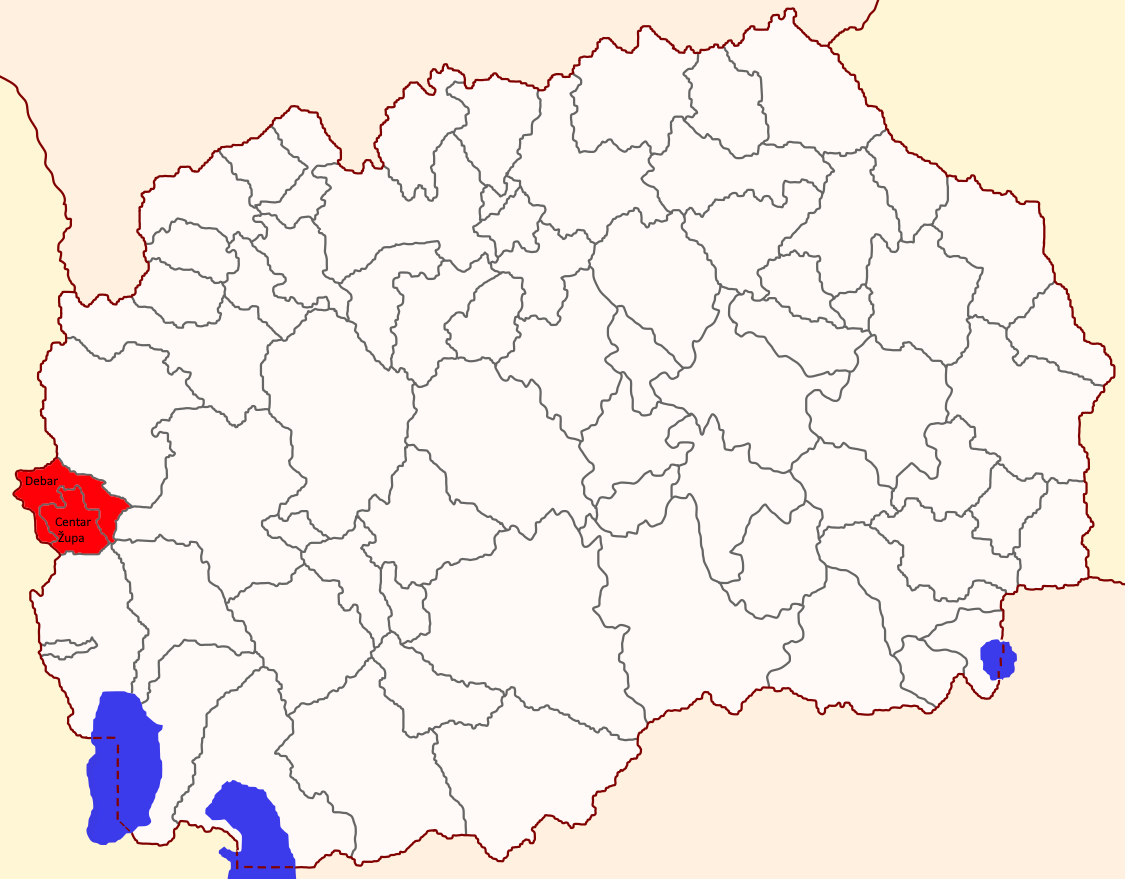
Quarantined areas on 13 March in red

On 11 March two more cases were confirmed positive, both from Debar. They are related to the first cases registered in the town.

On 13 March four more cases were confirmed positive. As all 4 were from Debar, the Government declared a state of emergency in the municipalities of Debar and Centar Župa. All movement inside and outside the two quarantined districts was banned; only people living there were allowed to return to their homes. Later on, President Pendarovski made a decision on the engagement of the Army in affected areas in Debar and Centar Župa. Also, it was announced that entries of foreign nationals to the country arriving from 'high-risk countries' would start getting denied.

On 14 March, 8 people were tested for coronavirus, 6 of which returned positive (5 from Debar and one from Skopje returning from a trip to Barcelona, Spain). A total of 14 of the patients were hospitalized at the Clinic for Infectious Diseases in Skopje, while the 5 new cases from Debar remained in the local hospital.

On 16 March, 7 persons (5 officially) were positive (4 from Debar, 1 from Skopje and two tested in a private clinic). The patient in Skopje had just returned from a trip to the Netherlands via Vienna, the two additional cases tested positive in the private Žan Mitrev Hospital. They got retested by the public laboratory the following day, and their positive results got confirmed. Because of the increased number of cases, both domestically and globally, the Government of North Macedonia decided to close the two international airports (Skopje and Ohrid) and ban foreigners from entering the country. The ban does not affect diplomats and medical personnel (which are required to obtain permission from the Ministry of Interior) and truck drivers.

On 17 March 5 new positive cases were confirmed - 4 in Debar (two nurses and two doctors, one of whom was Arben Agolli, former mayoral candidate and political activist) and one in Skopje, raising the number to 32. Political leaders decided to postpone the early parliamentary elections scheduled for 12 April.

On 18 March, 4 new cases were confirmed positive, all of them Macedonian citizens from Skopje coming from Belgium Prime Minister Oliver Spasovski announced that the Government is considering declaring a State of Emergency in the country, something that had never happened before. The State of Emergency was officially proclaimed by the President later the same day, and following this event, since the Parliament was dismissed, the Government gained legislative and executive power. Later that day 7 more people were tested positive on the virus (4 in Skopje and 3 in Debar).

On 19 March, 6 new cases were confirmed positive: 3 in Debar, 1 in Skopje, 1 in Gostivar, and 1 in Štip. The case from Gostivar is a Macedonian citizen coming from Switzerland, the case from Štip is a 4-year-old that got infected at a kindergarten in England and the rest are domestic citizens related to previously confirmed cases.

On 20 March, 19 new cases, all of them in Skopje, were confirmed positive. 17 of them were tested at the private Žan Mitrev Hospital. With this outbreak, Skopje surpassed Debar in the number of confirmed cases. Later the same day, 3 people tested positive (2 in Skopje and 1 in Štip). One of the people from Skopje said that she had travelled to Serbia before she was confirmed positive. Again, later the same day, 6 new cases tested positive (4 in Skopje and a married couple in Kavadarci).

On 21 March, 9 new cases were confirmed positive: 7 in Skopje and 2 in Štip. Later the same day the Government imposed a curfew as a protection measure against the virus outbreak. The curfew will be in the place everyday starting 22 March from 9 p.m. to 6 am.

On 22 March, 29 new cases were confirmed positive: 22 in Skopje, 3 in Štip, 2 in Debar, 1 in Ohrid, and 1 in Kumanovo. On 22 March, North Macedonia recorded the first fatality, а 57-year-old woman from Kumanovo that was confirmed positive to the virus postmortem.

On 23 March, 22 new cases were confirmed positive: 15 in Skopje, 4 in Debar, 2 Kumanovo, and 1 in Ohrid. The same day the second death was confirmed, a 63-year-old man from Debar that was hospitalized in Skopje on 17 March, reportedly his situation was stable, and he suddenly got in a bad state in the night when he was attached to a respiratory machine, but that wasn't enough.

On 24 March, 12 new cases were confirmed positive: 7 in Skopje and 5 in Kumanovo.

On 25 March, 29 new cases were confirmed positive: 20 in Skopje and 3 in Kumanovo, 3 in Veles, 2 in Prilep, and 1 in Debar. The same day the "Patient zero" of the outbreak in Debar, the wife of the couple from Balanci that tested positive on 6 March was confirmed as the third death case. She was 66 years old.

On 26 March, 24 new cases were registered positive: 15 from Skopje, 4 from Kumanovo, 2 from Debar, and 1 from Ohrid and Štip each, as well as the first case from Tetovo. 2 patients recovered.

On 27 March, 18 new cases were registered positive: 11 from Skopje, 4 from Prilep, 2 from Kumanovo, and 1 from Tetovo.

On 28 March, 22 new cases were confirmed positive: 9 in Skopje, 3 in Kumanovo and Struga each; 2 in Tetovo, Prilep, and Debar each; and 1 in Bitola. Also it was confirmed the fourth death case, a 66 years old woman from Struga.

On 29 March, 18 new cases were confirmed positive: 6 in Štip, 3 in Skopje, 3 in Veles, 2 in Struga, 1 in Strumica, 1 in Debar, 1 in Tetovo, and 1 in Gevgelija. Also two new death cases, a 31-year-old and 91-year-old men were confirmed today.

On 30 March, 26 new cases were confirmed positive: 19 in Skopje, 3 in Kumanovo, 1 in Prilep, 1 in Tetovo, 1 in Debar, and 1 in Kriva Palanka. The seventh death was recorded, a 79 years old man from Debar, while 9 patients recovered (8 from Skopje and 1 from Debar).

On 31 March the Ministry of Health announced 44 new cases: 23 in Kumanovo, 11 in Skopje, 5 in Tetovo, 2 in Prilep, 2 in Struga, and 1 in Prilep. A 45-year-old man from Kumanovo and a 78-year-old man from Debar, both with pre-existing conditions, passed away. Up to that day 3,518 tests were made.

=== April 2020 ===
On 1 April the Ministry of Health announced 25 new positive cases: 7 in Kumanovo, 7 in Skopje, 4 in Tetovo, 3 in Bitola, 2 in Struga, 1 in Gevgelija and 1 in Kočani. A 64-year-old woman from Struga with pre-existing conditions, passed away. It was also discovered that a 66-years-old woman, also from Struga, who had died a day before tested positive on the post mortem test. 5 patients recovered as well.

On 2 April, 30 new cases were registered positive: 12 in Skopje, 9 in Prilep, 8 in Kumanovo, and 1 in Kriva Palanka.

On 3 April, 46 new cases were registered positive: 23 in Kumanovo, 13 in Skopje, 2 in Debar, 2 in Veles, 2 in Gevgelija, 2 in Tetovo, 1 in Prilep and 1 in Gostivar. One more death was also confirmed: a 68-years-old man from the villages around Tetovo. In the evening, another suspected fatality was confirmed to be positive for COVID-19, a 70-years-old man from Kumanovo.

On 4 April, 53 new cases were registered positive: 14 in Struga, 13 in Skopje, 8 in Kumanovo, 6 in Kočani, 5 in Štip, 2 in Prilep, Tetovo and Gostivar each and 1 in Veles. Also five new death cases were confirmed.

On 5 April, 72 new cases were registered positive: 21 in Kumanovo, 14 in Skopje, 11 in Tetovo, 9 in Prilep, 7 in Kočani, 2 in Kruševo, Bitola and Radoviš each, 1 in Struga, Veles, Gostivar and Štip each. Also, one new case was confirmed dead, a 63-year-old man from Struga. Later the same day the Institute of Public Health of the Republic of North Macedonia corrected the previously announced numbers by cities in the term that one case from Gostivar is a citizen returning from Slovenia quarantined in Gostivar but lives in Strumica and one case from Tetovo is a citizen returning from abroad who is quarantined in Tetovo but lives in Radoviš.

On 6 April, 15 new cases were registered positive: 8 in Kumanovo, 4 in Skopje and 1 in Tetovo, Struga and Štip each. Also it was confirmed three new death cases: a 69-year-old and 65-years-old men from Tetovo and a 40-year-old man from Kočani. 6 patients recovered as well.

On 7 April, 29 new cases were registered positive: 15 in Skopje, 7 in Kumanovo, 3 in Struga and Kočani each and 1 in Prilep. It was also confirmed 5 new deaths: a 52 and 53-years-old men from Kumanovo, an 81-year-old woman from Štip, a 65-year-old woman from Struga and a 62-year-old woman from Tetovo. Later that day, it was confirmed one more death. A 45-year-old man from Skopje heading towards the City General hospital "8th September" for treatment.

On 8 April, 18 new cases were registered positive: 7 in Skopje, 4 in Prilep, 2 in Bitola and Kumanovo each, 1 in Kruševo, Kočani and Kavadarci. Two new deaths were also confirmed, a 73-year-old man from Kumanovo, and the one positive case from Kavadarci. He was a 44-year-old foreign citizen found dead in his apartment, who was tested postmortem. 7 patients recovered as well. Later that same day, one more death was confirmed. A 27-year-old woman from Kumanovo which, while infected, gave birth on 30 March.

On 9 April, 46 new cases were registered positive: 13 in Kumanovo, 12 in Skopje, 8 in Prilep and Veles each, 2 in Struga and 1 in Tetovo, Kočani and Probištip each.

On 10 April, 48 new cases were registered positive: 25 in Kumanovo, 11 in Skopje, 4 in Prilep, 3 in Struga, 2 in Gostivar and 1 in Ohrid, Štip, and Tetovo each. Two new deaths were also confirmed.

On 11 April, 49 new cases were registered positive: 14 in Kumanovo, 13 in Skopje, 8 in Prilep, 6 in Štip and Veles each and 1 in Gostivar and Kočani each. Two new deaths were also confirmed.

On 12 April, 68 new cases were registered positive: 18 in Kumanovo, 15 in Skopje, 14 in Prilep, 10 in Struga, 6 in Veles, 2 in Tetovo and 1 in Gostivar, Bitola and Kočani each.

On 13 April, 26 new cases were registered positive: 11 in Kumanovo, 4 in Skopje and Tetovo each, 3 in Prilep, 2 in Veles and 1 in Probištip and Kočani each. Four new deaths were also confirmed: A 63-year-old man and 79-year-old woman from Skopje, a 58-year-old man from Veles and a 67-year-old man from Prilep. 3 patients recovered.

On 14 April, 54 new cases were registered positive: 25 in Kumanovo, 13 in Skopje, 10 in Prilep, 2 in Veles, 1 in Štip, Tetovo, Gostivar and Kičevo each. Six deaths were confirmed and 42 recovered. Up to that day 9,262 tests were made.

On 15 April, 66 new cases were registered positive: 27 in Kumanovo, 10 in Skopje, 5 in Tetovo and Ohrid, 4 in Struga and Prilep, 3 in Kočani and Štip, 2 in Veles and Negotino each and 1 in Gostivar. One woman died at the age of 76 from Skopje. 12 patients recovered.

On 16 April, 107 new cases were registered positive: 44 in Kumanovo, 28 in Skopje, 11 in Prilep, 6 in Bitola, 5 in Tetovo, 4 in Veles, 2 in Debar and Gostivar, 1 in Struga, Štip, Kavadarci, Kočani and Kičevo each. This also marked the first cases in Debar in two weeks and just two days after being released from quarantine. One new death was confirmed and 23 recovered. On that day 660 new tests were made bringing the total to 10,422 tests. The same day Prime Minister Oliver Spasovski, Deputy Prime Minister Bujar Osmani, Health Minister Venko Filipče, Education Minister Arber Ademi, and State Secretary of the Health Ministry Vladimir Milošev all were put in a 14-day self-quarantine after the news broke that the Mayor of Kumanovo, who just recently had held a meeting with them, tested positive.

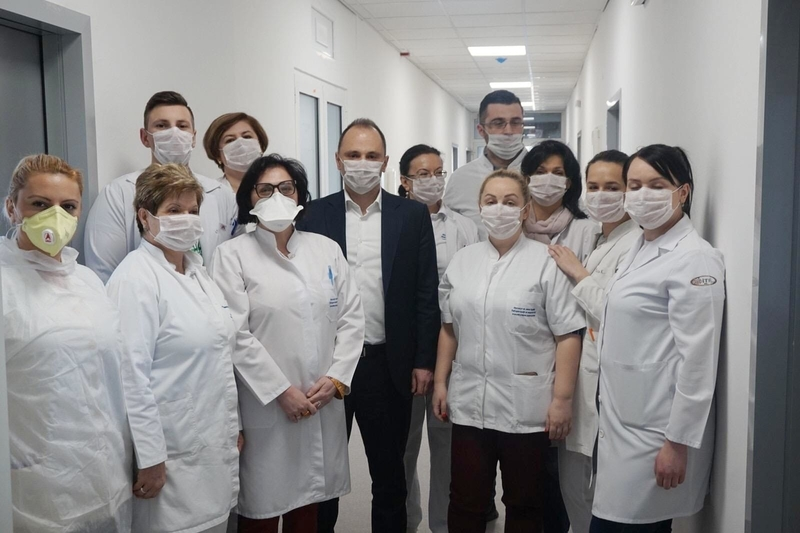
Health Minister Venko Filipče visiting the National Institute of Public Health in Skopje.

On 17 April, 36 new cases were registered positive: 22 in Skopje, 4 in Kumanovo, 3 in Prilep, Struga and Veles each and 1 in Bitola. Three deaths were confirmed and 18 recovered.

On 18 April, 53 new cases were registered positive: 13 in Skopje, 12 in Veles, 9 in Kumanovo and Prilep, 4 in Tetovo, 2 in Makedonski Brod, Bitola and Struga each. 25 patients recovered.

On 19 April, 37 new cases were registered positive: 9 in Kumanovo, 8 in Skopje and Ohrid, 5 in Prilep, 3 in Veles and Tetovo each and 1 in Kočani. Two deaths were confirmed: an 83-year-old man from Štip and a 66-year-old man from Skopje. 15 patients recovered.

On 20 April, 18 new cases were registered positive: 9 in Kumanovo, 2 in Štip, Skopje and Tetovo, 1 in Veles, Pehčevo and Gostivar each. Three deaths were confirmed and 21 recovered. This was the first time to have more recovered patients than infected.

On 21 April, 7 new cases were registered positive: 3 in Tetovo and 2 in Kumanovo and Kočani each. One death was confirmed: a 70-year-old man from Labuništa, a village near Struga. 24 patients recovered.

On 22 April, 28 new cases were registered positive: 11 in Skopje, 9 in Prilep, 3 in Veles, 2 in Kumanovo and Tetovo each and 1 in Valandovo. One death was confirmed: a 51-year-old man from Skopje. 48 patients recovered.

On 23 April, 41 new cases were registered positive: 17 in Skopje, 11 in Kumanovo, 5 in Prilep, 3 in Tetovo, 1 in Kavadarci, Gostivar, Negotino, Kriva Palanka and Kičevo each. The case from Negotino lives in Demir Kapija. 29 patients recovered. Up to that day 13,649 tests were made.

On 24 April, 26 new cases were registered positive: 11 in Skopje, 6 in Struga, 3 in Tetovo, 2 in Kumanovo, 1 in Bitola, Negotino, Vinica and Gostivar each. The case in Negotino is also from Demir Kapija. One death was confirmed: an 80-year-old man from Skopje. 36 patients recovered.

On 25 April, 41 new cases were registered positive: 17 in Skopje, 8 in Kumanovo and Prilep, 4 in Tetovo, 2 in Veles, 1 in Bitola and Struga each. Two deaths were confirmed: a 36-year-old man from Gostivar and a 25-year-old man from Skopje. 37 patients recovered.

On 26 April, 19 new cases were registered positive: 8 in Kumanovo, 3 in Skopje, 2 in Veles, Struga and Prilep, 1 in Vinica and Gostivar each. Two deaths were confirmed: a 49-year-old woman from Kumanovo and a 73-year-old man from Skopje. 126 patients recovered.

On 27 April, 13 new cases were registered positive: 5 in Kumanovo, 4 in Skopje, 2 in Prilep and Tetovo each. Four deaths were confirmed: a 58-year-old woman from Tetovo, an 81-year-old woman and 47-year-old man from Kumanovo as well as a 66-year-old man from Bitola. 53 patients recovered.

On 28 April, 22 new cases were registered positive: 11 in Skopje, 3 in Veles, 2 in Kumanovo, Gostivar and Kavadarci, 1 in Negotino and Struga each. Six deaths were confirmed: a 63 and 58 years old men from Prilep, a 75 and 58 years old men as well as a 71 years old woman from Skopje and a 51-year-old woman from Tetovo. 36 patients recovered.

On 29 April, 21 new cases were registered positive: 7 in Skopje, 6 in Kumanovo, 4 in Prilep, 1 in Struga, Tetovo, Pehčevo and Delčevo each. Two deaths were confirmed: a 50-year-old man from Skopje and a 51-year-old man from Prilep. 38 patients recovered. It was later discovered that the Mayor of Kumanovo was in fact, not positive. Everyone placed in self-isolation was released.

On 30 April, 23 new cases were registered positive: 6 in Tetovo, 5 in Skopje and Kumanovo, 3 in Prilep and 2 in Veles and Negotino each. The cases in Negotino are from Demir Kapija. Four deaths were confirmed: a 62-year-old man from Skopje, a 72 and 79 years old women from Kumanovo and a 59-year-old woman from Gostivar. 111 patients recovered.

=== May 2020 ===
On 1 May, 29 new cases were registered positive: 11 in Skopje, 6 in Veles, 4 in Kumanovo, 3 in Kočani and Prilep each and 2 in Tetovo. Four deaths were confirmed: a 55-year-old woman, 87-year-old man and 69-year-old woman from Prilep and a 62-year-old man from Kočani. 69 patients recovered.

On 2 May, 15 new cases were registered positive: 7 in Kumanovo, 4 in Prilep, 2 in Skopje, 1 in Struga and Tetovo each. One death was confirmed: a 61-year-old man from Struga. 45 patients recovered.

On 3 May, 5 new cases were registered positive: 2 in Skopje, 1 in Kumanovo, Tetovo and Prilep each. Two deaths were confirmed: a 94-year-old man from Kumanovo and a 69-year-old woman from Struga. 95 patients recovered. Up to that day 17,246 tests were made.

On 4 May, 7 new cases were registered positive: 4 in Tetovo, 1 in Skopje, Prilep and Kratovo each. One death was confirmed: Dragan Vučić, a famous Macedonian TV host and singer from Skopje. He was 65 years old. 47 patients recovered.

On 5 May, 8 new cases were registered positive: 4 in Veles, 3 in Skopje and 1 in Bitola. One death was confirmed: a 59-year-old woman from Tetovo. 21 patients recovered. For the first time in the country a COVID-19 patient was removed from a respiratory machine.

On 6 May, 13 new cases were registered positive: 5 in Veles, 3 in Prilep and Tetovo, 1 in Kumanovo and Bitola each. Two deaths were confirmed and 44 recovered.

On 7 May, 33 new cases were registered positive: 11 in Skopje, 9 in Veles, 5 in Prilep, 2 in Kumanovo, Bitola, Tetovo, 1 in Kriva Palanka and Štip each. One death was confirmed: a 70-year-old man from Veles. 22 patients recovered.

On 8 May, 14 new cases were registered positive: 6 in Veles, 5 in Skopje, 2 in Prilep and 1 in Tetovo. One death was confirmed: a 61-year-old man from Tetovo. 20 patients recovered.

On 9 May, 36 new cases were registered positive: 12 in Tetovo, 7 in Skopje, 6 in Veles, 4 in Kumanovo and Prilep, 1 in Pehčevo, Berovo and Gostivar each. One death was confirmed: a 58-year-old man from Veles. 13 patients recovered as well.

On 10 May, 20 new cases were registered positive: 12 in Skopje, 3 in Prilep, 2 in Tetovo, 1 in Bitola, Kumanovo and Gostivar each. 24 patients recovered.

On 11 May, 22 new cases were registered positive: 13 in Skopje, 7 in Tetovo and 2 in Prilep. 64 patients recovered. Up to that day 19,241 tests were made.

On 12 May, 10 new cases were registered positive: 6 in Skopje, 2 in Kumanovo, 1 in Veles and Prilep each. One death was confirmed: a 60-year-old man from Delčevo. 5 patients recovered as well.

On 13 May, 20 new cases were registered positive: 10 in Skopje, 5 in Prilep, 4 in Tetovo and 1 in Veles. Three deaths were confirmed: a 59-year-old woman from Prilep, a 68-year-old woman from Tetovo and a 76-year-old woman from Veles. 24 patients recovered.

On 14 May, 29 new cases were registered positive: 9 in Skopje, 6 in Prilep, 5 in Tetovo, 2 in Ohrid, Veles, Bitola and Struga each and 1 in Kumanovo bringing the total cases to 1723. That day 6 patients recovered as well, bringing the total recovered to 1235, the total death cases to 95 and active cases to 393.

On 15 May, 17 new cases were registered positive: 6 in Tetovo, 3 in Skopje and Prilep, 2 in Kumanovo and Veles each and 1 in Bitola. Two deaths were confirmed: a 72-year-old man from Veles and an 89-year-old man from Skopje. 16 patients recovered.

On 16 May, 22 new cases were registered positive: 9 in Skopje, 6 in Tetovo, 4 in Prilep and 1 Kumanovo, Ohrid and Veles. One death was confirmed: a 79-year-old woman from Skopje. 16 patients recovered. Up to that day 21,010 tests were made.

On 17 May, 30 new cases were registered positive: 11 in Skopje, 6 in Tetovo, 5 in Veles, 3 in Prilep, 2 in Kumanovo and 1 in Štip, Ohrid and Bitola. Three deaths were confirmed: a 58-year-old man from Veles, a 57 and 78-year-old men from Tetovo. 26 patients recovered. On 18 May, 25 new cases were registered positive: 16 in Skopje, 4 in Tetovo, 2 in Ohrid and Veles and 1 Struga. Three deaths were confirmed: a 60-year-old woman from Kumanovo, a 51-year-old man from Skopje and a 59-year-old man from Struga. 8 patients recovered.

On 19 May, 22 new cases were registered positive: 8 in Skopje, 4 in Veles, 3 in Tetovo, 2 in Štip and Prilep, 1 in Sveti Nikole and Gostivar each. Two deaths were confirmed: a 78-year-old man from Skopje and a 77-year-old man from Tetovo. 50 patients recovered as well.

On 20 May, 19 new cases were registered positive: 11 in Skopje, 2 in Kumanovo, 1 in Strumica, Vinica, Veles, Prilep, Tetovo and Gostivar each. Four deaths were confirmed: a 65-year-old woman and 71-year-old man from Skopje, a 73-year-old man from Tetovo and a 41-year-old man from Prilep. 16 patients recovered.

On 21 May, 40 new cases were registered positive: 26 (in which 1 was a worker from the screenings in the kindergartens) in Skopje, 10 in Tetovo, 1 in Kumanovo, Veles, Prilep and Bitola each. One death was confirmed: a 56-year-old man from Prilep. 11 patients recovered as well.

On 22 May, 23 new cases were registered positive: 12 in Skopje, 4 in Kumanovo and Tetovo each, 2 in Prilep and 1 in Negotino. One death was confirmed: a 47-year-old man from Tetovo. 9 patients recovered.

On 23 May, 20 new cases were registered positive: 16 in Skopje and 2 in Kumanovo and Prilep each. One death was confirmed: a 63-year-old man from Skopje. 24 patients recovered. Up to that day 2,060 tests were made from the screenings in the kindergartens.

On 24 May, 37 new cases were registered positive: 12 in Skopje, 8 in Kumanovo, 7 in Tetovo, 4 in Struga, 2 in Štip, Ohrid and Prilep each. 11 patients recovered. Up to that day 25,270 tests were made.

On 25 May, 21 new cases were registered positive: 12 in Skopje, 5 in Tetovo, 3 in Kumanovo and 1 in Štip. 17 patients recovered as well.

On 26 May, 16 new cases were registered positive: 9 in Skopje, 5 in Štip, 1 in Gostivar and Struga each. Three deaths were confirmed: a 78-year-old woman from Veles, an 84-year-old man from Tetovo and a 76-year-old woman from Skopje. 14 patients recovered. That day Prime Minister Oliver Spasovski said that from tomorrow the curfew will be lifted and that the catering facilities will start from Thursday - 28 May.

On 27 May, 25 new cases were registered positive: 14 in Skopje, 4 in Štip, 2 in Kumanovo and Tetovo and 1 in Prilep, Veles and Struga each. Three deaths were confirmed: two men from Skopje at the age of 58 and 47, as well as 41-year-old man from Tetovo. 17 patients recovered.

On 28 May, 38 new cases were registered positive: 24 in Skopje, 4 in Štip and Kumanovo each, 3 in Tetovo, 2 in Negotino and 1 in Bitola. Three deaths were confirmed: two men from Tetovo (age 74 and 57) and a 53-year-old man from Skopje that was tested postmortem. 16 patients recovered as well. That day the catering facilities officially started with a maximum of 4 people at a table. It was still required to wear masks outside with a more tightened police control, as well as 2 m. distance.

On 29 May, 52 new cases were registered positive: 26 in Skopje, 9 in Tetovo, 7 in Štip, 6 in Kumanovo, 2 in Struga and 1 in Veles and Kočani each. It was confirmed four deaths: a 73-year-old man from Skopje, an 82-year-old man from Veles, a 76-year-old woman from Skopje and a 55-year-old woman from Tetovo. 30 patients recovered that day. Extensive testing of workers began in the clothing industries in Štip due to the possible outbreak there. 153 workers were put in self-isolation. Education Minister Arber Ademi announced that the 2019–2020 school year will end on 10 June with no further measures. The same day President Stevo Pendarovski extended the state of emergency for 14 more days because the previous one expired.

On 30 May, 35 new cases were registered positive: 22 in Skopje, 6 in Tetovo, 4 in Kumanovo, 1 in Štip, Struga and Gostivar each. Five deaths were confirmed: from Skopje (age 69, 70 and 47 - men), a 70-year-old man from Struga and a baby also from Skopje who, at the request of the parents, was transported by plane to Switzerland where it died. 19 patients recovered.

On 31 May, 62 new cases were registered positive: 24 in Skopje, 14 in Štip, 12 in Tetovo, 4 in Struga, 3 in Gostivar, 2 in Kumanovo and 1 in Valandovo, Veles and Kočani each. Two deaths were confirmed: a 60-year-old man from Struga and a 64-year-old man from Gostivar who was tested postmortem. 17 patients recovered. Up to that day 29,575 tests were made. SDSM Vice President Muhamed Zekiri announced on his Facebook profile that he, his wife and their three-month-old daughter were positive for COVID-19. Everyone who had contact with them was put in self-isolation.

=== June 2020 ===
On 1 June, 89 new cases were registered positive: 35 in Skopje, 27 in Štip, 12 in Kumanovo, 7 in Tetovo, 4 in Kočani and 1 in Sveti Nikole, Strumica, Gostivar and Prilep each. Seven deaths were confirmed: two men from Skopje (age 83 and 80), two men from Kumanovo (age 73 and 66), a 44-year-old man from Struga and two men from Tetovo (age 65 and 54). 17 patients recovered. The director of the Public Revenue Office of the Republic of North Macedonia, Sanja Lukarevska, announced on her Facebook profile that she was positive on the virus. Immediately, she was put in home self-isolation.

On 2 June, 76 new cases were registered positive: 52 in Skopje, 14 in Tetovo, 2 in Kumanovo, Gostivar and Veles each, 1 in Štip, Kočani, Probistip and Kratovo each. One death was confirmed: a 56-year-old woman from Struga. 26 patients recovered. The Mayor of the Municipality of Cair, Visar Ganiu, announced on his Facebook profile that he was positive for COVID-19. The same day Prime Minister Oliver Spasovski said that there was no need for a new state of emergency, although they plan on putting local quarantines in the most infected municipalities.

On 3 June, 101 new cases were registered positive: 59 in Skopje, 12 in Kumanovo, 7 in Štip, 6 in Struga, 5 in Tetovo, 3 in Gostivar and Kočani, 2 in Probištip, 1 in Veles, Ohrid, Kavadarci and Prilep each. Four deaths were confirmed: an 84-year-old woman from Prilep, a 75-year-old man from Tetovo, a 71-year-old man from Kumanovo and a 58-year-old man from Skopje. 10 patients recovered. After the increased number of newly diagnosed cases, the Government decided to introduce a complete 80-hour ban on the movement of all citizens in Skopje including every municipality, in Kumanovo, Tetovo, Štip as well as the surrounding municipality in Skopje: Aračinovo, Zelenikovo, Ilinden, Petrovec, Lipkovo, Studeničani, Karbinci, Bogovinje, Brvenica, Tearce, Želino and Jegunovce. The ban on the movement started the next day from 9 pm and ended on Monday, 5 AM - 8 June. In all other cities, the movement of all citizens was prohibited from the next evening - 9 PM until 5 AM. On Friday, Saturday, Sunday in these cities the ban started at 4 pm and lasted until the next day 5 am. Due to the upcoming holiday (All Souls' Day), a ban has been introduced for visiting the cemetery on the entire territory of the country - also from 9 pm to 5 am, Monday.

On 4 June, 120 new cases were registered positive: 67 in Skopje, 19 in Kumanovo, 16 in Štip, 4 in Prilep, 9 in Tetovo, 2 in Veles, 1 in Gostivar, Negotino and Struga each. Two deaths were confirmed: a 65-year-old woman and a 69-year-old man. 16 patients recovered. The Director of the State Market Inspectorate, Stojko Paunovski, announced that the Department of the State Market Inspectorate in Kumanovo will be closed because one of the inspectors was positive.

On 5 June, a stunning 180 new cases were registered positive: 109 in Skopje, 26 in Kumanovo, 15 in Štip, 12 in Tetovo, 8 in Gostivar, 2 in Gevgejila, 1 in Negotino, Struga, Veles, Ohrid, Bitola, Valandovo, Debar and Sveti Nikole each. Two deaths were confirmed: a 52-year-old man from Kumanovo and a 68-year-old woman from Skopje. 11 patients recovered. Two doctors, who are also married and work at "Acibadem Sistina" Clinical Hospital, tested positive for the virus. One of them had no contact with the patients, while the other had minimal contact. The hospital continued to work at full capacity by taking all maximum measures to protect employees and patients.

On 6 June, 125 new cases were registered positive: 46 in Skopje, 19 in Kumanovo, 17 in Štip, 16 in Tetovo, 7 in Struga, 6 in Gostivar, 5 in Ohrid, 3 in Veles, 2 in Negotino, 1 in Prilep, Bitola, Delčevo and Kočani each. Two deaths were confirmed: a 73-year-old man from Prilep and a 67-year-old woman from Strumica. 8 patients recovered. Up to that day 35,471 tests were made.

On 7 June, 111 new cases were registered positive: 63 in Skopje, 12 in Štip, 11 in Kumanovo, 9 in Kočani, 8 in Tetovo, 3 in Veles and Gostivar, 1 in Kriva Palanka and Ohrid each. Two deaths were confirmed: a 53-year-old woman from Struga and an 80-year-old man from Prilep. 6 patients recovered.

On 8 June, 127 new cases were registered positive: 67 in Skopje, 33 in Štip, 10 in Tetovo, 6 in Ohrid, 5 in Struga, 2 in Kočani and Probištip, 1 in Debar and Kumanovo each. Three deaths were confirmed: a 70-year-old man from Kumanovo and two men from Skopje (age 62 and 78). 7 patients recovered.

On 9 June, 87 new cases were registered positive: 41 in Skopje, 16 in Štip, 12 in Kumanovo, 10 in Tetovo, 4 in Probištip, 2 in Ohrid, 1 in Gostivar and Struga each. One deaths was confirmed: a 74-year-old man from Kumanovo. 5 patients recovered.

On 10 June, 125 new cases were registered positive: 89 in Skopje, 11 in Tetovo, 8 in Ohrid, 4 in Kumanovo, 3 in Struga, 2 in Štip, Prilep and Strumica, 1 in Kičevo, Resen, Gostivar and Veles each. Seven deaths were confirmed: three from Skopje ( 79-year-old man, 54 and 77 years old women), two women from Struga (age 73 and 66), a 46-year-old woman from Tetovo and an 87-year-old man from Štip. 6 patients recovered. Internal Affairs Minister Nake Culev informed the public via social media that one adviser from his Cabinet was positive on the virus. He also added that the Ministry of Internal Affairs is taking every necessary measure to protect all employees in the ministry.

On 11 June, 175 new cases were registered positive: 131 in Skopje, 24 in Kumanovo, 5 in Tetovo, 4 in Veles, 2 in Štip, Prilep, Gostivar and Sveti Nikole each and 1 in Ohrid. Five deaths were confirmed: a 72-year-old man from Prilep, three from Skopje (a 60-year-old woman, a 64 and 59 years old men) and a 72-year-old man from Gostivar. 18 patients recovered. The President of the Independent Police Syndicate, Goce Delchev Todev, has been confirmed as a positive case. He had the first symptoms on 7 June, while the suspicious contact with an infected person was on 26 May. As of that today, the market inspection controls had been strengthened with the financial police. They had the legal right to legitimize the guests.

On 12 June, 164 new cases were registered positive: 85 in Skopje, 24 in Kumanovo, 18 in Tetovo, 9 in Ohrid, 5 in Štip and Struga, 3 in Prilep, 2 in Sveti Nikole, Gostivar and Resen, 1 in Makedonski Brod, Kriva Palanka, Valandovo, Gevgelija, Negotino and Kočani each. Two deaths were confirmed: a 53-year-old woman from Skopje and a 60-year-old woman from Tetovo. 12 patients recovered. Up to that day 41,049 tests were made. That day the President Stevo Pendarovski and Health Minister Venko Filipče announced that there was no need for a new state of emergency. The last one expired the other day.

On 13 June, 196 new cases were registered positive: 90 in Skopje, 45 in Tetovo, 17 in Kumanovo, 11 in Ohrid, 8 in Gostivar and Struga, 5 in Štip, 4 in Bitola, 2 in Resen and Pehčevo and 1 in Prilep, Veles, Kriva Palanka and Sveti Nikole each. Eight deaths were confirmed: four from Skopje (age 76 and 59 - women; age 67 and 43 - men), a 31-year-old woman from Gostivar, a 56-year-old man from Struga, a 68-year-old man from Resen and an 81-year-old man from Ohrid. 11 patients recovered.

On 14 June, 162 new cases were registered positive: 92 in Skopje, 32 in Tetovo, 14 in Resen, 5 in Debar, 4 in Ohrid, 3 in Kumanovo and Struga, 2 in Prilep and Gostivar and 1 in Štip, Gevgelija, Strumica, Kriva Palanka and Sveti Nikole each. Nine deaths were confirmed: three from Skopje (age 62, 69 - men and 73 - woman), two men from Tetovo (age 62 and 59), an 81-year-old woman from Prilep, a 70-year-old woman from Veles, a 69-year-old man from Struga and a 58-year-old woman from Gostivar that tested postmortem. 5 patients recovered.

On 15 June, 103 new cases were registered positive: 46 in Skopje, 17 in Tetovo, 9 in Struga, 6 in Kumanovo, Resen, Štip, 3 in Ohrid and Veles, 2 in Prilep and 1 in Bitola, Kavadarci, Gostivar, Strumica and Sveti Nikole each. Five deaths were confirmed: an 80-year-old man from Kumanovo, three women from Skopje (age 74, 73 and 45) and a 65-year-old man from Tetovo. 13 patients recovered.

On 16 June, 134 new cases were registered positive: 97 in Skopje, 11 in Tetovo, 7 in Resen, 5 in Kumanovo, 3 in Struga, 2 in Kruševo and Kičevo and 1 in Prilep, Veles, Bitola, Kavadarci, Valandovo, Kratovo and Negotino each. Eight deaths were confirmed: Five from Skopje (age 65, 68, 77 - men; age 76 and 77 - women), two from Tetovo (age 67 - man and age 71 - woman) and a 68-year-old man from Kumanovo. 34 patients recovered. The parliamentary election officially confirmed for 15 July. The voting lasted three days, and the election day was extended by two hours that ran from 7 am until 9 pm. Patients with mild symptoms voted two days earlier - 13 July.

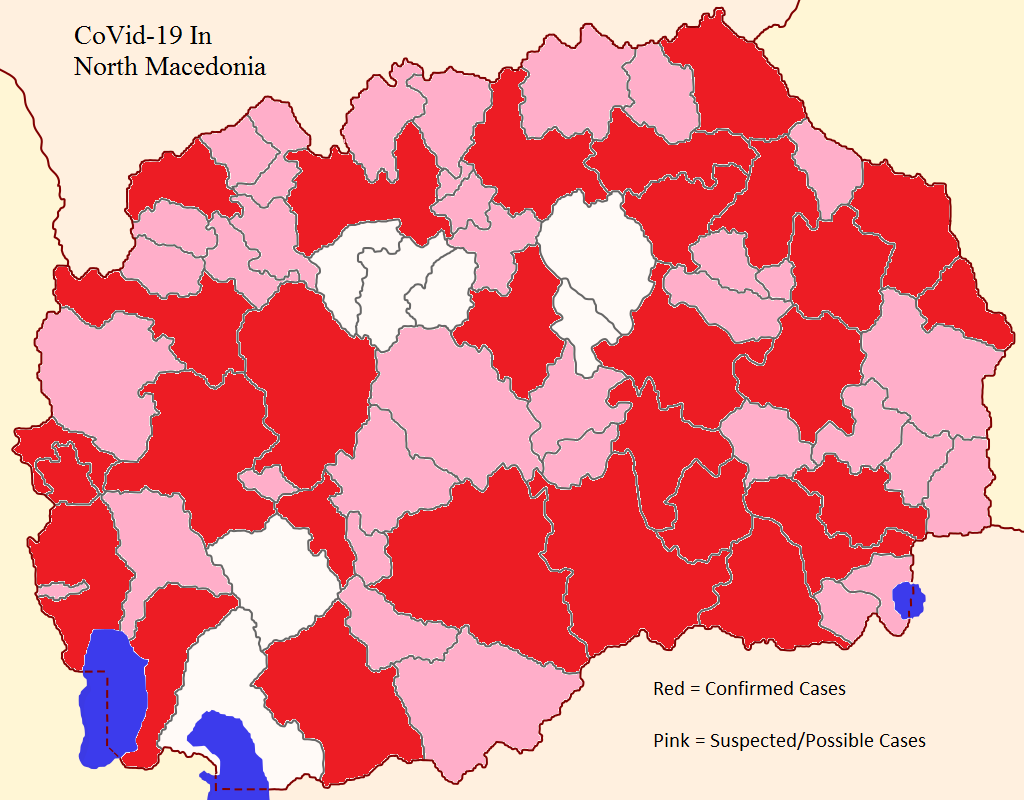
COVID-19 outbreak in North Macedonia as of 6 May

On 17 June, 193 new cases were registered positive: 140 in Skopje, 19 in Tetovo, 11 in Ohrid, 6 in Štip, 5 in Struga, 4 in Gostivar, 2 in Kumanovo, Veles and Resen and 1 in Sveti Nikole and Debar each. Nine deaths were confirmed: five from Skopje (age 85 - woman and age 78, 47, 69 and 67 - men), a 67-year-old woman from Kumanovo, a 61-year-old man from Tetovo, an 81-year-old man from Bitola and an 83-year-old man from Ohrid. 46 patients recovered. As of that day, according to the government decision, all border crossings in the country were opened, except for airports, but measures such as showing a valid negative PCR test (not older than 72 hours) upon entry into the country as well as a mandatory 14-day self-isolation remained in force. A novelty was that foreigners, instead of being able to transit through the country as before only through the border crossings Tabanovce and Bogorodica, were now able to do so through other passes within 5 hours. The government had also adopted protocols on the operation of catering facilities (hotels etc.), which took effect on Monday - 22 June.

On 18 June, 182 new cases were registered positive: 107 in Skopje, 23 in Tetovo, 14 in Kumanovo, 13 in Resen, 6 in Ohrid, 5 in Struga, 4 in Štip and Gostivar, 2 in Bitola and 1 in Strumica, Kočani, Berovo and Negotino each. Six deaths were confirmed: two men from Skopje (age 68 and 65), two men from Tetovo (age 81 and 72) and two from Kumanovo (age 64 - woman and 85 - man). 33 patients recovered.

On 19 June, 156 new cases were registered positive: 100 in Skopje, 19 in Tetovo, 11 in Kumanovo, 6 in Veles and Štip, 3 in Kočani, 2 in Struga and 1 in Debar, Prilep, Ohrid, Bitola, Gostivar, Kavadarci, Gevgelija, Sveti Nikole and Kratovo each. Six deaths were confirmed: four women from Skopje (age 70, 76 and two at the age of 74) and two from Tetovo (age 66 - woman and age 71 - man). 27 patients recovered.

On 20 June, 185 new cases were registered positive: 96 in Skopje, 20 in Struga, 18 in Debar, 14 in Tetovo, 8 in Resen, 7 in Ohrid, 4 in Štip, 3 in Kičevo, 2 in Kumanovo, Veles, Kavadarci, Gostivar, Sveti Nikole and 1 in Prilep, Kriva Palanka and Probištip each. Eleven deaths were confirmed: eight from Skopje (age 53, 66, 67, 62, 76 - men; 65, 73 and 65 - women), a 78-year-old man from Kumanovo, a 63-year-old man from Štip and a 62-year-old woman from Tetovo. 41 patients recovered. The Mayor of Skopje, Petre Šilegov, announced on his Facebook profile that he was positive on the virus.

On 21 June, 101 new cases were registered positive: 57 in Skopje, 19 in Tetovo, 13 in Kumanovo, 3 in Štip, 2 in Bitola and Resen and 1 in Debar, Struga, Veles, Ohrid and Gostivar each. Five deaths were confirmed: a 77-year-old woman from Skopje, a 45-year-old man from Gostivar, two from Kumanovo (age 40 - woman, 51 - man) and an 80-year-old man from Struga. 22 patients recovered. As of that day, The Children's Hospital "Kozle" began accepting patients with COVID-19. Venko Filipče said that there were 60 adult treatment facilities available for adults and 15 for children suspected of being infected. It planned to bring patients with a milder and moderate clinical picture to the hospital. Kozle was staffed with an internist and infectious disease teams, doctors and nurses, who came from both the Infectious Diseases Clinic and the interior.

On 22 June, 90 new cases were registered positive: 36 in Skopje, 13 in Ohrid, 10 in Struga, 8 in Štip, 6 in Resen, 4 in Tetovo, 2 in Kumanovo, Veles, Bitola, Kočani, Sveti Nikole and 1 in Gostivar, Kruševo and Probištip each. Nine deaths were confirmed: five from Skopje (woman - age 70 and age 90, 64, 57, 64 - men) and a 61-year-old man from Gostivar. 48 patients recovered.

On 23 June, 118 new cases were registered positive: 55 in Skopje, 20 in Tetovo, 9 in Kumanovo and Ohrid, 5 in Resen, 4 in Prilep and Gostivar, 2 in Struga, Strumica, Veles and 1 in Debar, Štip, Bitola, Gevgelija, Sveti Nikole and Kičevo each. Four deaths were confirmed: all from Skopje (age 58, 73, 72 - men and a 73-year-old woman). 74 patients recovered.

On 24 June, 136 new cases were registered positive: 80 in Skopje, 24 in Tetovo, 6 in Kumanovo, 5 in Ohrid, 4 in Gostivar and Resen, 3 in Prilep and Veles and 1 in Štip, Strumica, Struga, Kriva Palanka, Negotino, Kočani and Kičevo each. Eight deaths were confirmed: two from Skopje (age 56 - man and age 68 - woman), two women from Kumanovo (age 47 and 59), two from Tetovo (age 78 - man and age 47 - woman), a 61-year-old man from Kičevo and a 57-year-old man from Veles. 43 patients recovered. Up to that day 54,456 tests were made.

On 25 June, 153 new cases were registered positive: 66 in Skopje, 20 in Tetovo, 13 in Kumanovo and Štip, 12 in Resen, 7 in Struga and Ohrid, 6 in Kičevo, 3 in Sveti Nikole, 2 in Prilep and 1 in Bitola, Kriva Palanka, Kočani and Probištip each. Six deaths were confirmed: a 53-year-old man from Resen, a 61-year-old man from Skopje, two men from Štip (age 80 and 75), a 68-year-old man from Ohrid and a 79-year-old man from Tetovo. 75 patients recovered.

On 26 June, 163 new cases were registered positive: 70 in Skopje, 25 in Tetovo, 14 in Štip, 11 in Gostivar, 9 in Ohrid, 6 in Debar, 4 in Struga, Resen and Sveti Nikole, 3 in Kočani and Kavadarci, 2 in Kumanovo, Prilep, Veles, Kriva Palanka and 1 in Bitola and Strumica each. Three deaths were confirmed: a 42-year-old man from Resen and 2 from Skopje (83-year-old woman and 71-year-old man). 40 patients recovered.

On 27 June, 150 new cases were registered positive: 93 in Skopje, 12 in Tetovo, 9 in Ohrid, 8 in Kičevo, 7 in Kumanovo, 5 in Resen, 4 in Prilep, 3 in Štip, Gostivar, Struga, 1 in Bitola, Negotino and Kočani each. Nine deaths were confirmed: six from Tetovo (age 63, 60, 77, 72, 69, 58) and three from Skopje (age 79 - man, 58 and 81). 30 patients recovered.

On 28 June, 176 new cases were registered positive: 61 in Skopje, 22 in Tetovo, 19 in Struga, 14 in Ohrid and Štip, 8 in Kumanovo, 7 in Gostivar, 6 in Kičevo, 5 in Resen and Veles, 3 in Bitola, 2 in Kočani and 1 in Pehčevo, Demir Hisar, Probištip, Strumica and Debar each. Nine deaths were confirmed: seven men from Skopje (age 56, 59, 74, 88, 73 and two at the age of 63), a 79-year-old man from Tetovo and an 84-year-old man from Struga. 80 patients recovered.

On 29 June, 132 new cases were registered positive: 57 in Skopje, 19 in Tetovo, 13 in Štip, 10 in Kumanovo, 7 in Prilep, 6 in Gostivar, 5 in Ohrid, 4 in Veles, 3 in Struga, 2 in Sveti Nikole and Probištip and 1 in Debar, Resen, Kavadarci and Bitola each. Twelve deaths were confirmed: five from Skopje (age 72, 56, 69, 75 - men and age 83 - woman), an 81-year-old man from Štip, two men from Tetovo (age 49 and 62), a 70-year-old man from Gostivar, two men from Struga (age 66 and 60) and a 68-year-old woman from Veles. 112 patients recovered.

On 30 June, 126 new cases were registered positive: 66 in Skopje, 19 in Tetovo, 15 in Štip, 6 in Kumanovo, 4 in Kavadarci, 3 in Prilep and Resen, 2 in Gostivar, Veles, Probištip, Struga and 1 in Sveti Nikole and Bitola each. Four deaths were confirmed: a 56-year-old man from Tetovo, a 56-year-old woman from Skopje, a 71-year-old woman from Gostivar and an 83-year-old man from Prilep. 48 patients recovered.

=== July 2020 ===
On 1 July, 120 new cases were registered positive: 64 in Skopje, 14 in Tetovo, 7 in Ohrid, 5 in Struga, Resen, Kičevo, 4 in Kumanovo and Debar, 3 in Bitola, 2 in Gostivar, Sveti Nikole, Prilep and Štip each and 1 in Makedonski Brod. Four deaths were confirmed: gender and where they're from is unknown, age 51, 56, 58 and 67 years old. 123 patients recovered. That day the two airports opened in Skopje and Ohrid St. Paul the Apostle Airport. Passengers who had decided to "catch" the first plane, flew under unique protocols, adopted by the Commission of Infectious Diseases. Everyone who travelled had to arrive 3 hours before the flight and enter the building alone, unaccompanied, while respecting the mandatory distance and wearing protective masks. At the entrance, they had to disinfect their hands, and a thermal camera checked if they had a fever. For the suspicious cases, there was an isolation room, where medical teams took over.

On 2 July, 173 new cases were registered positive: 75 in Skopje, 14 in Struga, 10 in Ohrid, 9 in Kumanovo and Tetovo, 8 in Štip, 7 in Gostivar, 6 in Debar, Prilep, Sveti Nikole, 4 in Kočani, 3 in Kavadarci, Kičevo, Resen and Veles, 2 in Gevgelija and 1 in Strumica, Valandovo, Probištip, Kruševo and Berovo each. A baffling fifteen deaths were confirmed: three from The Clinic for Infectious Diseases and Febrile Conditions at the ages of 64, 73, and 80. Nine people died in the City General Hospital "8th September", two men aged 54, the rest aged 60, 61, 75, 45, 74, 57, and 65 years. Two people from Skopje and Gostivar died at home at the age of 65 and 82, respectively. A 67-year-old woman died at a hospital in Struga as well. 150 patients recovered.

On 3 July, 165 new cases were registered positive: 71 in Skopje, 20 in Tetovo, 15 in Kumanovo, 14 in Gostivar, 10 in Ohrid and Štip, 5 in Resen and Prilep, 4 in Probištip, 3 in Bitola and Struga, 2 in Kičevo and 1 in Debar, Veles and Makedonski Brod each. Seven deaths were confirmed: a 56-year-old man from Negotino, two men from Skopje (age 68 and 63), a 56-year-old man from Kočani, two men from Kumanovo (age 71 and 79), and a 55-year-old man from Struga. 128 patients recovered.

On 4 July, 147 new cases were registered positive: 64 in Skopje, 16 in Tetovo, 9 in Gostivar, 8 in Kumanovo, 7 in Sveti Nikole and Struga, 6 in Štip, 5 in Ohrid and Veles, 4 in Resen, Kičevo and Bitola, 3 in Prilep and 1 in Kratovo, Kočani, Strumica, Kriva Palanka and Probištip each. Six deaths were confirmed: three men from Skopje (age 59 and two at the age of 63), a 36-year-old man from Štip, a 69-year-old man from Berovo and a 78-year-old man from Kumanovo. 111 patients recovered. Safet Biševac, a former journalist and candidate for member of parliament from the list of VMRO-DPMNE, announced on his Facebook profile that he is among the positives.

On 5 July, 115 new cases were registered positive: 53 in Skopje, 13 in Struga, 8 in Tetovo and Ohrid, 6 in Prilep and Debar, 5 in Gostivar, 4 in Kumanovo and Kičevo, 3 in Štip, 2 in Resen and 1 in Veles, Sveti Nikole and Probištip each. Seven deaths were confirmed: All men (age 56, 62, 65, 82, 50 and 70). 40 patients recovered. Up to that day 67,165 tests were made. One of the deaths was Dr. Arifikmet Deari (age 64), a urologist from Tetovo. He was the first doctor in the country who died from COVID-19.

On 6 July, 78 new cases were registered positive: 26 in Skopje, 17 in Štip, 9 in Tetovo, 5 in Sveti Nikole and Gostivar, 4 in Kumanovo, 3 in Struga and Probištip and 1 in Vinica, Kočani, Kriva Palanka, Bitola, Ohrid and Debar each. Five deaths were confirmed: all men (age 70, 80, 77, 63 and 86). One was from Kumanovo, one from Struga and three from Skopje. 172 patients recovered.

On 7 July, 120 new cases were registered positive: 63 in Skopje, 14 in Tetovo, 12 in Gostivar, 6 in Debar and Struga, 4 in Kumanovo, Ohrid and Štip, 2 in Veles and Prilep and 1 in Bitola, Sveti Nikole and Kičevo each. Five deaths were confirmed: two women at the age of 46 and 85 and three men at the age of 78, 65 and 76. Two of them were from Tetovo, one from Kumanovo and two from Skopje. 125 patients recovered.

On 8 July, 163 new cases were registered positive: 87 in Skopje, 16 in Tetovo, 10 in Štip, 9 in Sveti Nikole, 8 in Struga and Gostivar, 7 in Kumanovo, 5 in Resen, 3 in Prilep and Kičevo, 2 in Debar and 1 in Ohrid, Demir Hisar, Kavadarci, Kratovo and Strumica each. Eight deaths were confirmed: six from Skopje (age 59, 58, 61, 62, 66 - men and age 79 - woman), a 52-year-old man from Debar and a 53-year-old man from Tetovo. A marvellous 230 patients recovered. Up to that day 71,220 tests were made.

On 9 July, 168 new cases were registered positive: 83 in Skopje, 26 in Tetovo, 8 in Gostivar, Kumanovo and Ohrid, 6 in Štip and Kičevo, 5 in Struga, 4 in Sveti Nikole, 3 in Prilep, 2 in Debar, Bitola and Probištip and 1 in Makedonski Brod, Kruševo, Kočani, Resen and Kriva Palanka each. Three deaths were confirmed: a 63-year-old woman that tested postmortem and two men at the age of 66 and 70. One of them was from Gostivar and two from Skopje. 70 patients recovered. There was a lot of confusion that day about which employees had to return to work. Venko Filipče pointed out that the government decree applied to those parents whose children were up to 10 years of age and who went to school. That meant that only parents whose children studied in school had to return to work (because the school year had ended), but not those parents whose children went to kindergarten.

On 10 July, 205 new cases were registered positive: 60 in Skopje, 29 in Sveti Nikole, 23 in Gostivar, 17 in Debar, 13 in Kumanovo and Tetovo, 12 in Struga, 10 in Štip, 7 in Kičevo, 3 in Resen, Bitola and Veles, 2 in Prilep, Demir Hisar and Probištip and 1 in Makedonski Brod, Berovo, Strumica, Kruševo, Ohrid and Kavadarci each. Six deaths were confirmed: five men (aged 62, 68, 94, 65, 70) and one woman at the age of 80. 336 patients recovered.

On 11 July, 199 new cases were registered positive: 90 in Skopje, 24 in Sveti Nikole, 17 in Kumanovo, 12 in Struga and Tetovo, 9 in Štip, 6 in Debar, 5 in Gostivar, 4 in Ohrid, 3 in Prilep, Probištip and Kičevo, 2 in Kavadarci, Strumica, Bitola and Resen and 1 in Demir Hisar, Radoviš and Kruševo each. Eight deaths were confirmed: six men (age 24, 63, 64, 70, 74) and two women at the age of 83 and 54 years. 120 patients recovered.

On 12 July, 136 new cases were registered positive: 46 in Skopje, 14 in Štip, 13 in Gostivar, 12 in Tetovo, 9 in Struga, 7 in Debar, 6 in Kumanovo, 5 in Sveti Nikole, 4 in Kičevo and Resen, 3 in Radoviš, 2 in Demir Hisar, Strumica, Ohrid and Kruševo and 1 in Kratovo, Probištip, Kočani, Prilep and Veles each. Six deaths were confirmed: all men at the age of 46, 53, 63, 69, 42 and 80 years. Two were from Skopje, one from Kumanovo, two from Struga and one from Gostivar. 123 patients recovered.

On 13 July, 88 new cases were registered positive: 30 in Skopje, 13 in Štip, 11 in Struga, 8 in Kičevo and Kumanovo, 5 in Prilep, 3 in Tetovo, 2 in Ohrid and 1 in Sveti Nikole, Kratovo, Kavadarci, Gostivar, Probištip, Veles, Bitola and Debar each. Three deaths were confirmed: two men from Skopje (age 43 and 72) and a 76-year-old woman from Štip. 123 patients recovered.

On 14 July, 135 new cases were registered positive: 76 in Skopje, 13 in Tetovo, 10 in Gostivar, 7 in Struga, 6 in Kumanovo and Štip, 3 in Bitola and Kičevo, 2 in Sveti Nikole and Debar and 1 in Resen, Gevgelija, Kratovo, Makedonski Brod, Ohrid, Kavadarci and Prilep each. Four deaths were confirmed: an 86-year-old man from Ohrid, a 72-year-old man from Tetovo, a 62-year-old man from Kičevo and a 67-year-old woman from Skopje. 142 patients recovered. Voting in the parliamentary elections had begun. The positives of COVID-19 and those in isolation voted the previous day - 13 July. The sick, the weak, and the detained voted this day - 14 July. On Wednesday, 15 July, the voting lasted until 9 pm to avoid crowds at the polling stations, and to leave the citizens more space and time to freely express their will.

On 15 July, 198 new cases were registered positive: 83 in Skopje, 27 in Sveti Nikole, 21 in Štip, 12 in Kumanovo, 11 in Bitola, 10 in Gostivar, 9 in Tetovo, 7 in Radoviš, 3 in Struga, Ohrid and Demir Hisar, 2 in Veles, Prilep and Probištip and 1 in Kičevo, Kočani and Debar each. Four deaths were confirmed: all men at the ages of 49, 61, 72 and 70 years. Two of them were from Prilep, one from Tetovo and one from Skopje. 97 patients recovered.

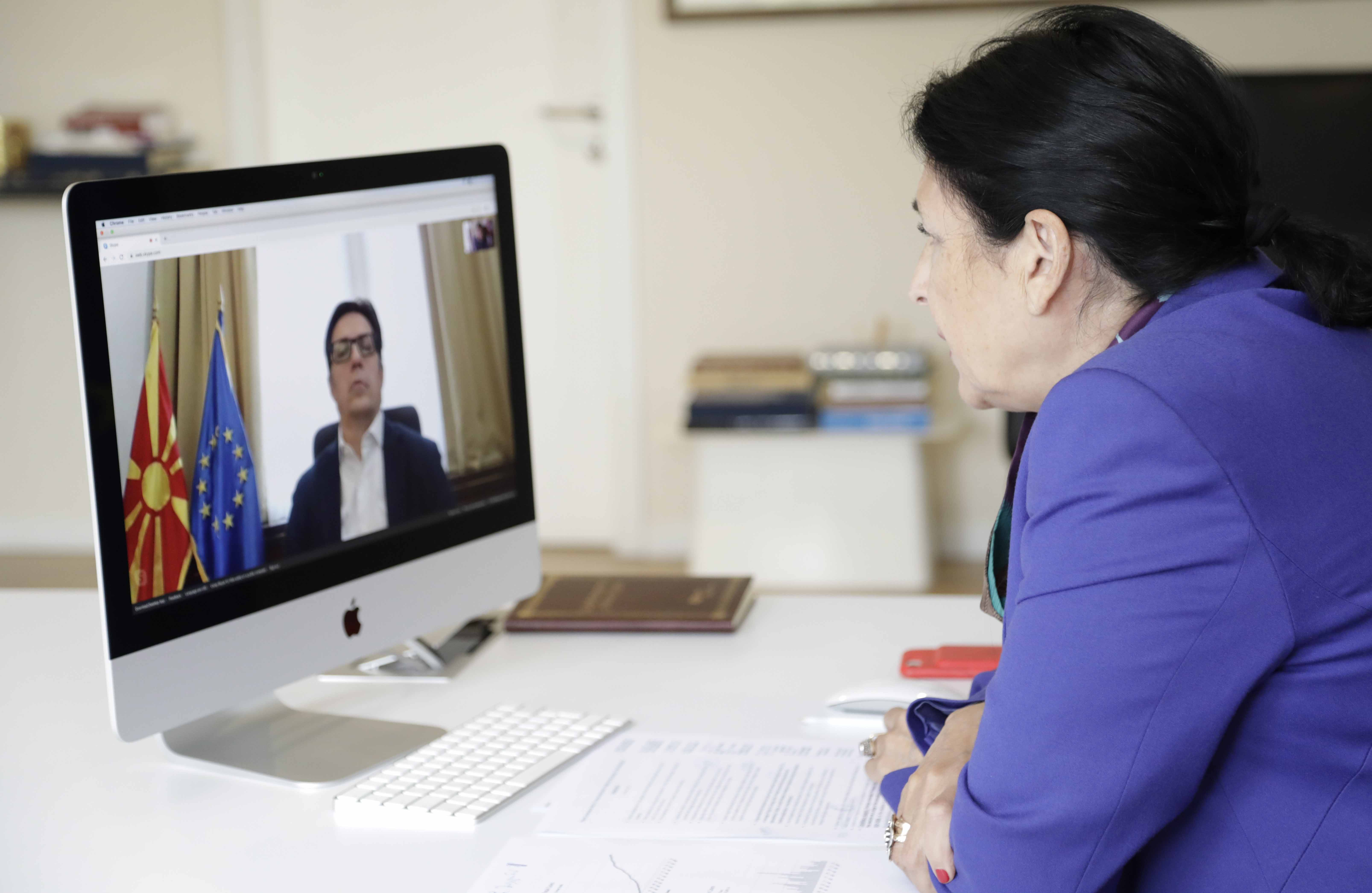
President Stevo Pendarovski is holding a video conference with Georgian President Salome Zurabishvili to discuss the current COVID-19 pandemic.

On 16 July, 94 new cases were registered positive: 49 in Skopje, 13 in Gostivar, 9 in Sveti Nikole, 8 in Štip, 6 in Tetovo, 2 in Kumanovo, Struga, Kočani and Kičevo each and 1 in Prilep. Eight deaths were confirmed: six men (two at the age of 60, 68, 67 and two at the age of 63 years) and two women at the age of 73 and 72 years. 42 patients recovered. Two of them were from Skopje, one from Prilep, one from Struga, one from Ohrid, one from Kičevo and two from Gostivar.

On 17 July, 164 new cases were registered positive: 59 in Skopje, 23 in Sveti Nikole, 18 in Debar, 17 in Štip, 12 in Kumanovo, 9 in Gostivar, 6 in Tetovo, Struga and Kičevo, 2 in Kavadarci and Probištip and 1 in Resen, Demir Hisar, Prilep and Bitola each. Five deaths were confirmed: three men from Skopje at the age of 65, 35 and 77 years, a 51-year-old man from Tetovo and a 70-year-old man from Resen. 74 patients recovered. Up to that day 83,216 tests were made.

On 18 July, 241 new cases were registered positive: 73 in Skopje, 60 in Štip, 32 in Tetovo, 14 in Gostivar, 10 in Kumanovo, 8 in Kočani, 6 in Gevgelija, 5 in Sveti Nikole and Prilep, 4 in Strumica, 3 in Bitola, Struga, Kriva Palanka and Radoviš, 2 in Demir Hisar, Ohrid and Kičevo and 1 in Debar, Probištip, Veles, Kratovo, Vinica and Kruševo each. Eight deaths were confirmed: all men at the age of 76, 66, 59, 67, 61, 62, 67 and 76 years. Two were from Skopje, Tetovo and Struga each, one from Gostivar and one from Strumica. 51 patients recovered.

On 19 July, 127 new cases were registered positive: 57 in Skopje, 13 in Štip, 12 in Sveti Nikole, 10 in Struga, 8 in Gostivar, 7 in Ohrid, 6 in Tetovo, 4 in Kumanovo and Kičevo, 2 in Kratovo and Probištip and 1 in Kavadarci and Demir Hisar each. Eight deaths were confirmed: four men at the age of 70, 93, 78 and 62, and four at the age of 34, 45, 78 and 87 with unknown gender. Five of them were from Skopje, one from Tetovo, one from Struga and one from Kičevo. 83 patients recovered. Health Minister Venko Filipče saw photos on social media of parties and gatherings happening around many cities without following the protocols and protection measures. He then urgently requested all qualified institutions - the Ministry of Internal Affairs and the competent inspectorates to conduct investigations and sanctions in all of those unlawful gatherings. "Everyone must respect the measures to prevent the spread of the virus. Any non-compliance with the measures will be adequately sanctioned", Filipče said on his Facebook profile.

On 20 July, 96 new cases were registered positive: 24 in Skopje and Štip, 9 in Struga, 7 in Tetovo, 6 in Ohrid and Kumanovo, 5 in Radoviš, 4 in Gostivar, 3 in Strumica and Sveti Nikole, 2 in Kočani and 1 in Kriva Palanka, Prilep and Bitola each. Ten deaths were confirmed: seven men at the age of 76, 48 (tested postmortem), 79, 60, 62, 79, 82 and three at the age of 85, 71 and 53 with unknown gender. Four were from Skopje, two from Kumanovo and one from Štip, Tetovo, Gostivar and Kičevo each. 61 patients recovered.

On 21 July, 163 new cases were registered positive: 52 in Skopje, 33 in Štip, 21 in Kumanovo, 17 in Gostivar, 7 in Struga, 5 in Bitola, 4 in Kavadarci and Tetovo, 3 in Sveti Nikole and Demir Hisar, 2 in Kočani, Probištip, Debar, Veles and Prilep and 1 in Makedonski Brod, Resen, Kičevo, and Ohrid each. 69 patients recovered. There were no confirmed deaths.

On 22 July, 137 new cases were registered positive: 64 in Skopje, 19 in Štip, 14 in Struga, 7 in Kumanovo and Tetovo, 6 in Gostivar, 5 in Ohrid, 4 in Kičevo, 3 in Sveti Nikole, 2 in Bitola and Radoviš and 1 in Prilep, Kruševo, Demir Hisar and Veles each. Ten deaths were confirmed: five people (age 79, 76, 82, 61, 72) and five men (age 81, 80, 63, 66 and 67). Five of them were from Skopje, two from Kumanovo, one from Tetovo, Gostivar and Radoviš each. 131 patients recovered. The Minister of Economy, Krešnik Bekteši, announced on his Facebook profile that he among the positives.

On 23 July, 123 new cases were registered positive: 54 in Skopje, 18 in Štip, 16 in Gostivar, 6 in Struga, 5 in Kumanovo and Tetovo, 4 in Kičevo and Debar, 3 in Ohrid, 2 in Sveti Nikole and Bitola and 1 in Prilep, Kruševo, Resen and Demir Hisar each. Three deaths were confirmed: all men (age 55, 61 and 67). One of them was from Skopje, one from Debar and one from Strumica. 74 patients recovered. The Minister of Education, Arber Ademi, announced that he is among the positives.

On 24 July, 129 new cases were registered positive: 45 in Skopje, 25 in Štip, 9 in Gostivar and Tetovo, 7 in Kumanovo, 6 in Kičevo and Bitola, 5 in Struga, 4 in Prilep, 3 in Sveti Nikole, Kočani and Ohrid and 1 in Kavadarci, Delčevo, Demir Hisar and Debar each. Six deaths were confirmed. 109 patients recovered.

On 25 July, 137 new cases were registered positive: 60 in Skopje, 16 in Štip, 13 in Kumanovo, 11 in Gostivar, 7 in Tetovo, 5 in Debar, Bitola, Kičevo, 3 in Sveti Nikole, Prilep and Veles and 1 in Ohrid, Struga, Vinica, Demir Hisar, Probištip and Kočani each. Nine deaths were confirmed. 103 patients recovered. Up to that day 94,092 tests were made.

On 26 July, 152 new cases were registered positive: 39 in Skopje, 20 in Kumanovo, 15 in Gostivar, 14 in Štip, 13 in Struga, 9 in Tetovo, 8 in Debar, 5 in Kavadarci and Bitola, 4 in Strumica, 3 in Gevgelija, Delčevo and Ohrid, 2 in Makedonski Brod, Demir Hisar and Kičevo and 1 in Radoviš, Kočani, Prilep, Kratovo and Sveti Nikole each. 70 patients recovered.

On 27 July, 128 new cases were registered positive: 52 in Skopje, 29 in Štip, 13 in Gostivar, 10 in Kavadarci, 6 in Kumanovo and Tetovo, 3 in Makedonski Brod, 2 in Vinica, Bitola and Prilep and 1 in Sveti Nikole, Kočani and Probištip each. Six deaths were confirmed: four men from Skopje (age 82, 48, 82 and 60), a 52-year-old man from Kičevo and a 75-year-old man from Struga. 137 patients recovered.

On 28 July, 102 new cases were registered positive: 39 in Skopje, 13 in Štip, 11 in Kumanovo, 8 in Gostivar, 6 in Bitola, 4 in Kičevo, 3 in Sveti Nikole, Kavadarci and Ohrid, 2 in Tetovo and Struga and 1 in Makedonski Brod, Vinica, Demir Hisar, Kočani and Radoviš each. Five deaths were confirmed: a 72-year-old man from Kičevo, a 70-year-old man from Skopje, a 76-year-old man from Štip, a 48-year-old man from Prilep and a 64-year-old man from Kumanovo. 99 patients recovered.

On 29 July, 188 new cases were registered positive: 44 in Skopje, 24 in Tetovo, 23 in Gostivar, 21 in Struga and Kumanovo, 18 in Štip, 10 in Kičevo, 6 in Ohrid, 5 in Bitola, 3 in Makedonski Brod and Kavadarci, 2 in Negotino and Probištip and 1 in Debar, Resen, Demir Hisar, Kočani, Veles and Kriva Palanka each. Five deaths were confirmed: a 62-year-old woman from Skopje, two men from Tetovo (age 76 and 61), a 78-year-old woman from Kumanovo and a 74-year-old man from Bitola. 268 patients recovered.

On 30 July, 119 new cases were registered positive: 35 in Skopje, 17 in Štip, 15 in Kumanovo, 8 in Bitola, Gostivar and Kičevo, 5 in Demir Hisar, 4 in Tetovo, 3 in Veles, Prilep, Struga and Ohrid, 2 in Kavadarci and 1 in Kriva Palanka, Resen, Berovo, Sveti Nikole and Kočani each. Four deaths were confirmed: three men from Skopje (age 65, 66, 73) and a 72-year-old man from Gostivar. 89 patients recovered. Another possible outbreak may have begun in the clothing industries in Štip, due to many workers testing positive. The director of the Center for Public Health in Štip, Marija Dimitrova, said that according to their analysis from the beginning of the pandemic, until then the virus has entered a total of 19 textile factories. She also added that the situation is under control.

On 31 July, 139 new cases were registered positive: 36 in Skopje, 16 in Gostivar, 15 in Kičevo, 14 in Tetovo, 11 in Štip and Kumanovo, 8 in Struga, 6 in Vinica, 5 in Kavadarci, 4 in Veles, 2 in Debar, Bitola and Probištip and 1 in Makedonski Brod, Sveti Nikole, Resen, Kruševo, Strumica, Prilep and Kočani each. Six deaths were confirmed: five men from Skopje (age 66, 67, 34, 67, 86) and a 76-year-old man from Kočani. 534 patients recovered.

=== August 2020 ===
On 1 August, 138 new cases were registered positive: 47 in Skopje, 17 in Kumanovo, 16 in Štip, 10 in Debar and Gostivar, 6 in Makedonski Brod, 5 in Bitola, Veles and Kočani, 3 in Kičevo, 2 in Prilep, Tetovo, Vinica and Ohrid and 1 in Resen, Kratovo, Kavadarci, Demir Hisar, Probištip and Kriva Palanka each. Seven deaths were confirmed: two women from Skopje (age 67 and 64), a 53-year-old woman from Makedonski Brod, a 64-year-old man from Štip, a 41-year-old woman from Kičevo, a 27-year-old man from Bitola and a 78-year-old man from Debar. 144 patients recovered.

On 2 August, 166 new cases were registered positive: 47 in Skopje, 23 in Štip, 17 in Kumanovo, 15 in Gostivar, 12 in Tetovo and Kičevo, 10 in Makedonski Brod, 9 in Kavadarci, 7 in Struga, 3 in Ohrid, 2 in Negotino, Vinica and Sveti Nikole and 1 in Gevgelija, Demir Hisar, Bitola, Strumica and Debar each. Four deaths were confirmed: a 77-year-old man from Skopje, a 70-year-old man from Bitola, a 72-year-old man from Kičevo and a 58-year-old man from Štip. 185 patients recovered. Up to that day 105,357 tests were made.

On 3 August, 74 new cases were registered positive: 22 in Gostivar, 14 in Skopje, 13 in Štip, 8 in Kumanovo, 4 in Vinica, 3 in Sveti Nikole, Berovo and Kavadarci, 2 in Kičevo and 1 in Struga and Kočani each. Three deaths were confirmed: a 73-year-old man from Bitola, a 44-year-old man from Skopje and a 73-year-old man from Demir Hisar. 90 patients recovered.

On 4 August, 75 new cases were registered positive: 32 in Skopje, 8 in Gostivar and Kavadarci, 7 in Tetovo, 5 in Štip, 4 in Kumanovo, 2 in Makedonski Brod, Kičevo and Probištip and 1 in Sveti Nikole, Kočani, Negotino, Strumica and Vinica each. Five deaths were confirmed: a 52-year-old man from Skopje, a 64-year-old man from Ohrid, two men from Kumanovo (age 55 and 82) and a 62-year-old man from Gostivar. 136 patients recovered.

On 5 August, 88 new cases were registered positive: 23 in Skopje, 11 in Struga, 10 in Štip, 8 in Kumanovo and Ohrid, 4 in Makedonski Brod and Gostivar, 3 in Bitola and Prilep, 2 in Vinica, Sveti Nikole, Veles, Tetovo, Debar and Kičevo and 1 in Strumica and Kavadarci each. Six deaths were confirmed: two women from Skopje (age 56 and 75), a 91-year-old man from Kumanovo, a 64-year-old man from Gostivar, an 82-year-old man from Tetovo and a 58-year-old man from Štip. 113 patients recovered. The government has declared a 30-day state of emergency on the country's southern and northern border, due to the significant number of migrants passing through the country, risking the spread of the disease.

On 6 August, 113 new cases were registered positive: 35 in Skopje, 23 in Štip, 15 in Gostivar, 12 in Kumanovo, 7 in Bitola, 6 in Ohrid, 5 in Tetovo, 2 in Demir Hisar and Kočani and 1 in Makedonski Brod, Prilep, Valandovo, Vinica, Struga and Probištip each. Six deaths were confirmed: three men from Skopje (age 64, 22, 83), a 72-year-old man from Kumanovo, a 48-year-old man from Struga and a 75-year-old man from Ohrid. 259 patients recovered.

On 7 August, 155 new cases were registered positive: 51 in Skopje, 22 in Gostivar, 14 in Kavadarci, 13 in Štip, 11 in Kumanovo, 10 in Tetovo, 6 in Ohrid, 5 in Makedonski Brod, 4 in Demir Hisar and Prilep, 3 in Kičevo and Struga, 2 in Debar, Negotino and Vinica and 1 in Bitola, Probištip and Gevgelija each. Two deaths were confirmed: a 74-year-old man from Štip and an 80-year-old man from Skopje. 127 patients recovered.

On 8 August, 200 new cases were registered positive: 65 in Skopje, 21 in Štip, 14 in Kumanovo and Gostivar, 12 in Veles and Tetovo, 7 in Kavadarci and Bitola, 6 in Debar and Kičevo, 5 in Kočani, 5 in Struga, 4 in Makedonski Brod, Ohrid and Radoviš, 3 in Prilep, Probištip and Sveti Nikole, 2 in Demir Hisar and 1 in Negotino, Kriva Palanka and Strumica each. Four deaths were confirmed: a 70-year-old man from Skopje, a 58-year-old man from Gostivar, a 51-year-old man from Kumanovo and a 66-year-old man from Makedonski Brod. 15 patients recovered.

On 9 August, 85 new cases were registered positive: 32 in Skopje, 9 in Štip and Kumanovo, 7 in Gostivar and Kičevo, 6 in Kavadarci, 4 in Bitola, 3 in Debar, 2 in Veles and 1 in Vinica, Demir Hisar, Prilep, Tetovo, Kočani and Strumica each. Four deaths were confirmed: two men from Skopje (age 72 and 84), a 62-year-old man from Debar and a 66-year-old woman from Štip. 45 patients recovered.

On 10 August, 109 new cases were registered positive: 20 in Skopje, 16 in Kumanovo, 15 in Kavadarci, 13 in Štip, 10 in Gostivar, 7 in Kičevo, 5 in Sveti Nikole, 4 in Veles, 3 in Vinica and Tetovo, 2 in Makedonski Brod, Ohrid, Radoviš and Struga and 1 in Negotino, Demir Hisar, Bitola, Gevgelija and Prilep each. One death was confirmed: a 70-year-old woman from Skopje. 422 patients recovered.

On 11 August, 141 new cases were registered positive: 60 in Skopje, 35 in Gostivar, 15 in Struga, 13 in Sveti Nikole, 7 in Kumanovo, 5 in Kičevo, 4 in Prilep, 3 in Ohrid and Tetovo, 2 in Kratovo and Kruševo and 1 in Makedonski Brod, Resen, Probištip, Veles and Radoviš each. One death was confirmed: a 51-year-old woman from Skopje. 161 patients recovered. Up to that day 117,475 tests were made.

On 12 August, 139 new cases were registered positive: 30 in Skopje, 20 in Kumanovo, 19 in Gostivar, 15 in Štip, 8 in Struga and Kavadarci, 6 in Sveti Nikole and Tetovo, 5 in Kočani, 4 in Kičevo, 3 in Makedonski Brod and Ohrid, 2 in Demir Hisar, Strumica, Bitola and Debar and 1 in Gevgelija, Prilep, Berovo and Delčevo each. One death was confirmed: a 66-year-old man from Ohrid. 239 patients recovered.

On 13 August, 141 new cases were registered positive: 48 in Skopje, 21 in Kumanovo, 15 in Štip, 9 in Kavadarci, 7 in Bitola and Vinica, 5 in Kičevo, 4 in Makedonski Brod, Strumica and Gostivar, 3 in Sveti Nikole, 2 in Radoviš, Debar and Probištip and 1 in Berovo, Demir Hisar, Gevgelija, Negotino, Struga and Prilep each. Two deaths were confirmed: an 88-year-old man from Skopje and an 80-year-old woman from Kičevo. 175 patients recovered.

On 14 August, 160 new cases were registered positive: 38 in Skopje, 20 in Tetovo, 19 in Kumanovo, 13 in Gostivar, 10 in Štip, 9 in Struga, 8 in Kičevo, 5 in Sveti Nikole, 4 in Ohrid, Prilep Kavadarci and Kočani, 3 in Veles and Demir Hisar, 2 in Makedonski Brod, Berovo, Strumica, Vinica and Pehčevo and 1 in Valandovo, Bitola, Probištip, Negotino, Debar and Delčevo each. Three deaths were confirmed: two men from Skopje (age 60, 72) and a 53-year-old woman from Gostivar. 368 patients recovered.

On 15 August, 141 new cases were registered positive: 51 in Skopje, 19 in Kumanovo, 16 in Struga, 15 in Štip, 6 in Tetovo and Prilep, 4 in Bitola, 2 in Debar, Makedonski Brod, Vinica, Gostivar, Ohrid, Kičevo, Sveti Nikole, Veles and Probištip and 1 in Negotino, Berovo, Gevgelija, Delčevo, Kavadarci and Radoviš each. Four deaths were confirmed: two men from Skopje (age 55 and 54 years), a 70-year-old man from Sveti Nikole and a 69-year-old woman from Kavadarci. 93 patients recovered.

On 16 August, 87 new cases were registered positive: 34 in Skopje, 20 in Gostivar, 15 in Kumanovo, 8 in Gostivar, 4 in Kavadarci, 3 in Kičevo, 2 in Strumica and 1 in Berovo, Bitola and Struga each. Five deaths were confirmed: three men from Skopje (age 49, 74, 72), a 53-year-old woman from Struga and a 57-year-old woman from Berovo. 51 patients recovered.

On 17 August, 103 new cases were registered positive: 26 in Kumanovo, 15 in Gostivar, 13 in Skopje, 7 in Prilep and Demir Hisar, 6 in Kavadarci, 5 in Štip and Vinica, 3 in Sveti Nikole and Tetovo, 2 in Kriva Palanka, Ohrid, Gevgelija, Delčevo and Kičevo and 1 in Negotino, Strumica and Berovo each. Three deaths were confirmed: a 69-year-old man from Skopje, a 77-year-old man from Makedonski Brod and a 35-year-old man from Veles. 187 patients recovered.

On 18 August, 130 new cases were registered positive: 40 in Skopje, 18 in Gostivar, 13 in Štip and Tetovo, 7 in Kičevo, 6 in Ohrid and Kumanovo, 5 in Vinica and Prilep, 4 in Struga and Delčevo, 3 in Bitola, 2 in Probištip, Kavadarci and 1 in Berovo and Strumica each. Two deaths were confirmed: a 70-year-old man from Skopje and a 75-year-old man from Štip. 152 patients recovered. The Government at that day's 81st session, accepted the recommendations of the Commission for Infectious Diseases for organizing teaching in primary and high schools, according to which the educational program for 2020–2021 should be conducted online with the following exceptions: Students from first to third grade have to attend classes with a physical presence in the classroom, under the capacity of schools to implement the plan and protocols of the Ministry of Education and Science and with parental approval. For students with chronic diseases, distance learning should take place online; Teaching with physical presence in the classroom can be realized in schools with provided sanitary-hygienic conditions for maintaining general and personal hygiene listed in the Protocols, according to the epidemiological situation in the area / municipality, but only if the school founder submits a request to the Ministry of Education and science with an explanation for the fulfillment of the criteria and conditions in accordance with the protocols, and only after obtaining consent from the Government of the Republic of North Macedonia, after previously receiving a positive opinion from the Ministry of Education and Science, and the Commission for Infectious Diseases at the Ministry of Health; Lastly, in schools that have dual education classes, the practical part of the teaching, in the companies, should take place with physical presence at the workplace, respecting the general protocols for protection and the protocols of the companies where the practical teaching is performed.

On 19 August, 108 new cases were registered positive: 45 in Skopje, 18 in Kumanovo, 11 in Štip, 9 in Gostivar, 4 in Delčevo, Veles and Struga, 3 in Sveti Nikole and Prilep, 2 in Vinica, Tetovo and Strumica each and 1 in Debar. Two deaths were confirmed: a 64 and 72 years old men from Kumanovo. 112 patients recovered.

On 20 August, 118 new cases were registered positive: 55 in Skopje, 12 in Kumanovo, 9 in Prilep, 6 in Tetovo, 5 in Štip, 4 in Kičevo and Kavadarci, 3 in Vinica and Ohrid, 2 in Kriva Palanka, Veles, Delčevo, Gostivar and 1 in Sveti Nikole, Kratovo, Probištip, Berovo, Bitola, Struga, Debar and Kočani each. Three deaths were confirmed: an 82-year-old man from Štip, a 74-year-old man from Struga, and a 64-year-old man from Tetovo. 127 patients recovered.

On 21 August, 115 new cases were registered positive: 32 in Skopje, 14 in Štip, 11 in Gostivar, 10 in Tetovo, 8 in Berovo and Debar, 7 in Kumanovo, 4 in Sveti Nikole, 3 in Kriva Palanka, Gevgelija, Ohrid, Delčevo and Kičevo, 2 in Veles, Prilep and 1 in Probištip and Kočani each. Three deaths were confirmed: two men from Skopje (age 68, 62) and a 68-year-old man from Struga. 225 patients recovered. Up to that day 134,318 tests were made.

On 22 August, 159 new cases were registered positive: 32 in Skopje, 25 in Kumanovo, 22 in Gostivar, 15 in Struga, 9 in Tetovo and Berovo, 8 in Štip, 7 in Prilep, 5 in Gevgelija and Kavadarci, 4 in Delčevo and Ohrid, 3 in Kičevo, 2 in Vinica, Veles, Kočani and 1 in Strumica, Radoviš, Pehčevo, Bitola and Debar each. Six deaths were confirmed: four men from Skopje (age 77, 80, 85, 86), a 76-year-old man from Štip and a 61-year-old man from Gostivar. 75 patients recovered.

On 23 August, 137 new cases were registered positive: 53 in Skopje, 19 in Kumanovo, 10 in Gostivar, 8 in Štip, 7 in Bitola, 6 in Sveti Nikole and Veles, 5 in Delčevo, 4 in Tetovo, 3 in Makedonski Brod and Kičevo, 2 in Gevgelija, Berovo, Struga, Negotino, Kriva Palanka, Probištip each and 1 in Strumica. One death was confirmed: a 63-year-old man from Debar. 58 patients recovered.

On 24 August, 78 new cases were registered positive: 28 in Skopje, 8 in Prilep and Gostivar, 5 in Kumanovo, 4 in Debar, Tetovo and Berovo, 3 in Kičevo and Delčevo, 2 in Negotino, Kavadarci, Kočani and 1 in Bitola, Ohrid, Makedonski Brod, Radoviš and Probištip each. Four deaths were confirmed: two men from Gostivar (age 82 and 71), a 73-year-old woman from Tetovo and a 68-year-old woman from Kumanovo. 40 patients recovered.

On 25 August, 127 new cases were registered positive: 38 in Skopje, 23 in Kumanovo, 15 in Prilep, 12 in Gostivar, 8 in Tetovo, 5 in Veles, 3 in Štip, Berovo, Delčevo, Probištip, Sveti Nikole, 2 in Pehčevo, Struga and 1 in Debar, Negotino, Vinica, Strumica, Kavadarci, Ohrid and Bitola each. Five deaths were confirmed: a 69-year-old woman from Kriva Palanka, a 70-year-old man from Skopje, a 69-year-old man from Negotino and two men from Gostivar (age 63 and 77 years). 60 patients recovered.

On 26 August, 119 new cases were registered positive: 53 in Skopje, 13 in Prilep, 9 in Kumanovo, 6 in Gostivar and Delčevo, 5 in Berovo, 4 in Štip and Tetovo, 3 in Kočani, Sveti Nikole and Kičevo, 2 in Struga, Pehčevo and 1 in Negotino, Radoviš, Veles, Ohrid, Kriva Palanka and Bitola each. Five deaths were confirmed: two men from Skopje (age 50, 49 years), an 82-year-old man from Prilep, a 63-year-old man from Kumanovo and a 46-year-old woman from Tetovo. 297 patients recovered. That day the Ministry of Education and Science confirmed that the 2020–2021 academic year will start on 1 October, instead of 1 September like usual. They said that the protocols for physical education in the schools were adopted.

== Management ==
=== Government response and controversies ===
Preparatory measures against a potential outbreak started in late January 2020. National measures against the pandemic are led by Health Minister Venko Filipče and the Commission for Infectious Diseases. Filipče stated that the state has made preparations to deal with the virus if it appears in North Macedonia. He said that the preparations had been made in terms of staff, infrastructure, equipment, places for hospitalization of patients, and that the country is ready for the virus. Besides all that, the response of the Government has been criticized as illogical on several occasions by the population. One of the most controversial decisions was related to a local curfew of the Skopje area that prompted massive exodus into smaller towns. Another was the Government's decision to grant travel vouchers to citizens; that is believed to have caused a second wave in Ohrid, mainly due to non-enforcement of social distancing rules and a massive influx of domestic tourists. In general, people were pessimistic about the Governments conducts. A public opinion poll was done; 44% of respondents had estimated that the country was moving in the wrong direction.

=== Social measures ===
==== January and February: Beginning ====
Starting from 27 January, thermal cameras installed at the Skopje Airport, started monitoring passengers coming from Istanbul and Dubai who serve as links to China, which was at the moment the epicenter of the epidemic. Following the first meeting with WHO representative Jihane Tawilah, the country's preparedness for early detection & stopping the spread of the virus was assessed as satisfactory. Health minister Venko Filipče announced that North Macedonia's healthcare system is completely prepared for a potential outbreak. In addition to the thermal cameras, information leaflets were distributed to police stations and the custom checks at all border passes.

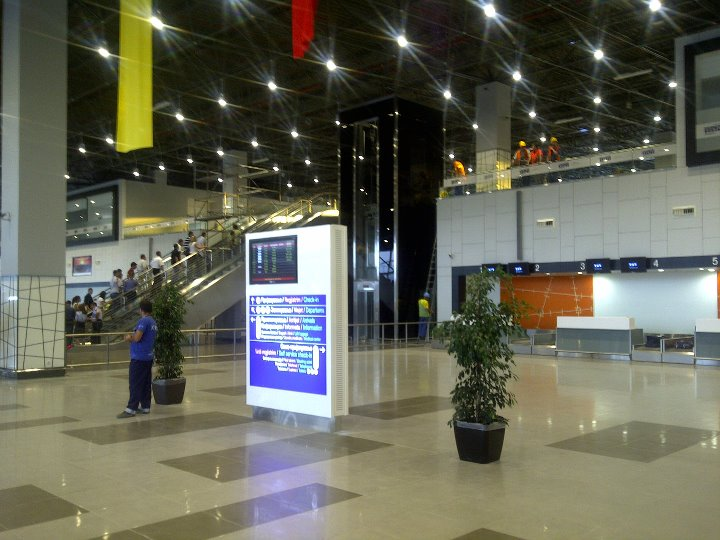
The first preventive measures against the spread of the virus were introduced at the airport in Skopje, where a thorough camera scan of passengers was done coming from Dubai and Istanbul in the end of January.

On 4 February, the first reagents to detect the virus were imported from Niš, Serbia. Filipče said that at the moment, the country had about 40,000 surgical masks and medical protective suits, but additional procurement was considered for preparing the country for a potential outbreak. Since early February, the Institute for Public Health has been in close contact with the WHO and has been implementing their recommendations. On 6 February, the first set of preventive recommendations were announced to the public - ranging from frequent hand washing, using a handkerchief when sneezing or coughing, avoiding unprotected contact with sick people etc. On this day, Filipče met with the Chinese ambassador in North Macedonia, Zhang Zuo, and it was agreed that all Sinohydro workers would have to undergo a 14-day quarantine before returning to their posts in North Macedonia.

Following a meeting with Filipče on 15 February, WHO representative Jihane Tawilah announced that they regard North Macedonia's system for early detection and early intervention of infectious diseases as one of the best in the region. On 24 February, on a meeting of the Centre for Crisis Management, it was decided that all passengers arriving from Northern Italy will be required to enter the country from a reduced number of border passes and that they will be interviewed by the police and the specially appointed medical staff. At the Skopje Airport, thermal cameras would screen all arriving passengers regardless of the destination, and thermal guns at Ohrid Airport would screen patients arriving from high-risk destinations. It was also announced that apart from the Clinic of Infectious Diseases in Skopje, three more hospitals (in Štip, Veles and Gostivar) will receive potential COVID-19 patients. Filipče appealed to all Macedonian citizens to cancel all but urgent trips to Northern Italy. At that point, the COVID-19 outbreak in Italy was at the very beginning, with about 220 confirmed cases and 7 deaths. The next day, 25 February, the government officially recommended all trips to Northern Italy to be cancelled. Patients returning from Northern Italy would be given recommendations on what to do if they develop symptoms similar to COVID-19: it was not required, however, for them to undergo a 14-day quarantine. Also, several phone numbers were introduced for patients experiencing symptoms similar to COVID-19, and potential patients were instructed not to visit the hospitals before calling these phone numbers. Following a social media campaign by high school students, the Ministry of Health procured new quantities of soap and disinfectants for all schools and kindergartens in the country.

On 26 February, the country confirmed its first case of SARS-CoV-2, a 50-year-old woman that got tested at the Clinic for Infectious Diseases in Skopje, arriving from Italy where she had been sick for two weeks. The Ministry of Health held two conferences that day, explaining the contact-tracing system that was going to be used for every SARS-CoV-2 positive case: namely, all contacts of a positive person will be ordered to self-isolate for two weeks. Wearing of face masks was recommended for all suspected cases; however, healthy persons were given recommendations not to wear masks. No additional measures were announced.

On 28 February, the government recommended all mass gatherings to be cancelled: this included the carnivals in Strumica and Prilep. It was also recommended for all sports events to take place without any audience until 6 March. This measure was later extended to 13 March. The government also appealed to all employees in the state or local institutions, employees in the school system, as well as pupils and students who had traveled to risk countries in the past two weeks to avoid going to work or school.

==== March: Stricter preventive measures and sanctions were introduced ====
Starting from 4 March, WizzAir passengers arriving from Treviso and Milan were required to fill a questionnaire during the flight.

Disregarding the recommendations and measures against the spread of the virus has been noted in the institutions as well. Among the first positives of the virus was the director of the Clinic for Skin Diseases in Skopje, who did not call for an examination after returning from Italy and went to work for five days. On the same day, 9 May, a total of 90 people who had contact with her or were present at the clinic were placed in two-week isolation, and the clinic itself was closed. The skin department and the skin disease clinic in Štip are also closed because doctors from the institutions attended a symposium in Skopje, where the director participated. Minister Venko Filipče announced that non-compliance with anti-virus measures would be punishable by a fine of up to one year in prison. A similar case was reported on 20 March in Kavadarci, where a doctor from the General Hospital went to work despite the prescribed measure for self-isolation of his entire family. He was fined 4,500 euros. He was convicted of "failing to comply with health regulations during an epidemic." The director of the Infectious Diseases Clinic in Ohrid was fired on 29 March because the 66-year-old woman from Struga, who is thought to have died of the virus, was not admitted to the clinic.

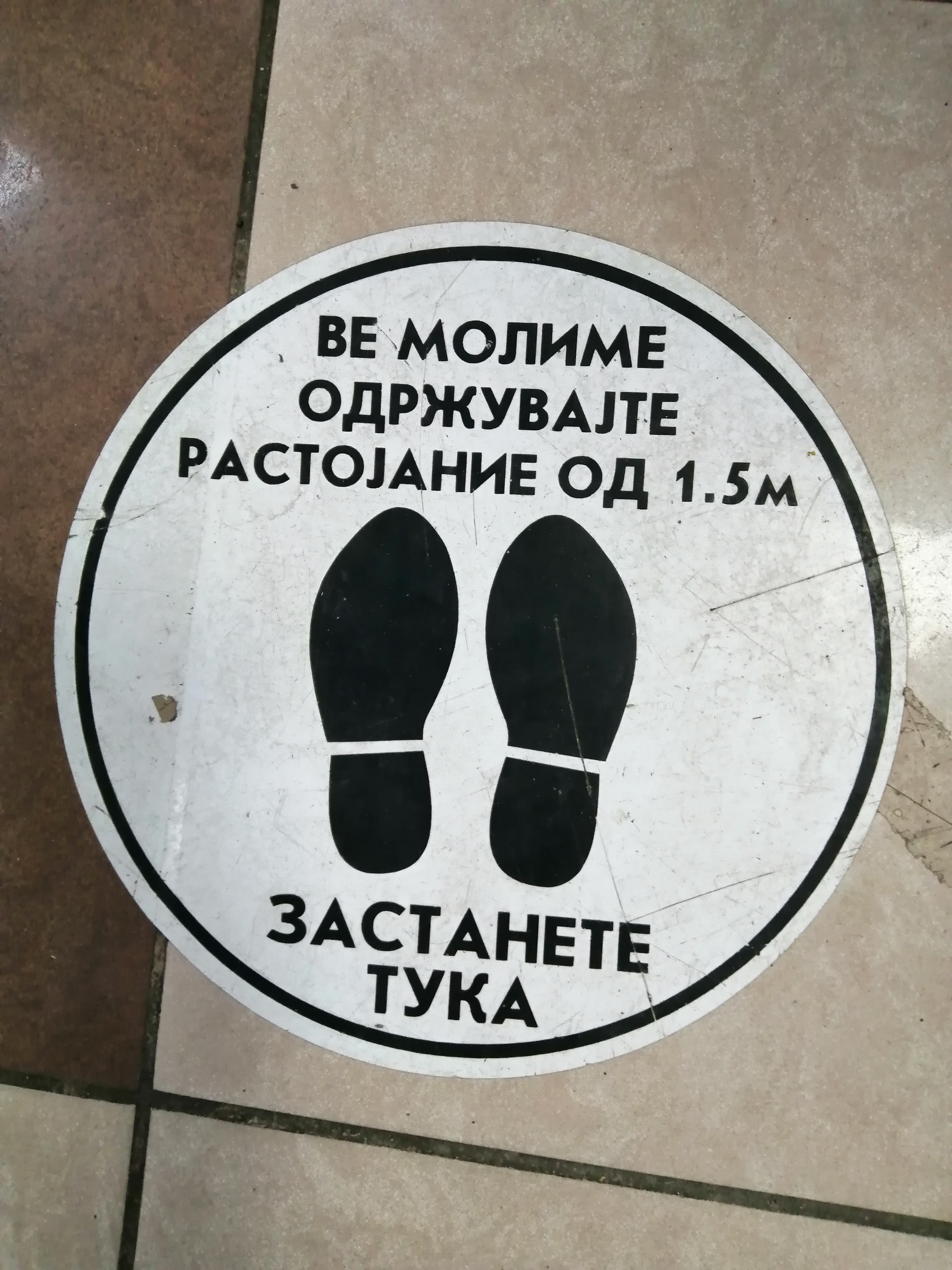
Sign on the floor saying to maintain a physical distance of 1.5 meters.

A day after the case was discovered with the director of the clinic in Skopje, the Macedonian authorities started tightening the measures against the spread of the virus. On 11 March, all educational institutions in the country were closed. Due to the introduction of this measure, the Government decided that one of the parents of a child up to 10 years of age should have the right to stay at home with paid leave. Since most of the infected were from the neighbouring municipalities of Debar and Centar Župa, which are located in the western part of Macedonia, on 13 March a crisis situation was declared in these two municipalities. They are practically quarantined, with an increased presence of emergency services and the deployment of an army to control the spread of the virus. At that time, there were currently 13 confirmed cases of coronavirus infection across the country. In the next few days, a series of measures have been introduced to massively prevent the pandemic, closing restaurants and shopping malls, as well as airports and border crossings for foreign nationals, banning mass public gatherings.

On 18 March, the government led by Technical Prime Minister Oliver Spasovski called for a state of emergency to be declared throughout the country. As the Assembly was dissolved due to the announced elections, the request was forwarded to President Stevo Pendarovski. On the same day, Pendarovski declared a state of emergency throughout the territory for at least 30 days. He announced this at a press conference at 6 pm. This is the first time in the history of the country that an emergency measure has been introduced. At the time of the introduction of the measure, there were 35 patients with COVID-19. With this, the Government, in addition to the executive power, also received the legislative power in the country, so that it was allowed to bring decrees with legal force. Pendarovski pointed out that the state of emergency is also important for the economy. Pendarovski said that for the government to continue to function as a technical one, is a chance for the government and the opposition to work together and "not worry about their political ratings."

From 23 March, a daily curfew began throughout the country from 9 pm to 6 am to deal with the pandemic. This prohibited the movement of the population anywhere in the country during these hours. Authorities have criticized the timing of the curfew. The Helsinki Committee reacted that the purpose of this measure is unclear because, during the day parks, playgrounds and other public areas remained the main gathering places of large groups of people. In the following days, the ban on movement restricted contact between adults over the age of 67, who are considered a risk group, and young people under the age of 18, who may be carriers of the virus. Farmers are excluded from the ban on the movement. In March, some municipalities called for a state of emergency on their territory.

==== April: Virus continued to spread, masks were required ====
On 3 April, a complete ban on the movement of the population in the Municipality of Kumanovo during the weekend was introduced. During the introduction of the prohibition in this municipality, there were a total of 85 infected with the virus. In this case, only farmers were allowed to move around the villages, exclusively for work.

On 14 April, Debar and Centar Župa were officially released from the lockdown after 10 days without any cases. Then, the army reallocated in Kumanovo, where the situation was now critical.

On 22 April, curfews were eased but everyone was required to wear masks or scarfs in public places and indoor places (like supermarkets, shops, public transport). Warnings were given until 30 April. After that, people had to pay 20 euros for breaking the decree; 2,000 euros for people connected with law and 1,000 euros for responsible workers in a company.

==== May: Development ====
On 8 May, the curfew on the weekends was eased. Going outside in the weekends was allowed from 5 AM to 7 PM like in the weekdays. Health minister Venko Filipče said that starting from 14 May, there will be screenings in the kindergartens. The employees have already been recruited for work but they had to be tested first. On 15 May for example, 184 tests have been made: 106 in Bitola, 6 in Veles and 72 in Skopje. Only one worker was found positive, from Bitola. The screenings continued throughout whole May, which even more employees are currently being tested. Same day, it was announced that adults over 67 and young people under 18 were allowed to go outside from 5 am to 7 pm as the others. Previously for 67> the time was from 5 am to 12 pm and <18 from 1 pm to 7 pm.

Furthermore, president Stevo Pendarovski extended the state of emergency on 16 May, which had expired, for 14 more days. On 22 May, the curfew for the following weekend changed due to the upcoming holidays. It started from 11 am Sunday - 24 May, until 5 am Tuesday - 26 May.

== Statistics ==
=== Total confirmed cases ===
View source data.

=== Number of new cases ===
| View source data. |

=== Number of new deaths ===
| View source data. |

=== Number of new recoveries ===
| View source data. |

=== Demographic data ===
View source data.
No. of deaths per age group

COVID-19 deaths in North Macedonia by age and gender
| Classification | | Deaths | | |
| Classification | | Male | Female | Total |
|---|---|---|---|---|
| Age | 90+ | 6 | 0 | 6 |
| Age | 80-89 | 47 | 11 | 58 |
| Age | 70-79 | 113 | 40 | 153 |
| Age | 60-69 | 140 | 37 | 177 |
| Age | 50-59 | 66 | 23 | 89 |
| Age | 40-49 | 27 | 11 | 38 |
| Age | 30-39 | 6 | 1 | 7 |
| Age | 20-29 | 4 | 1 | 5 |
| Age | 10-19 | 0 | 0 | 0 |
| Age | 0-9 | 1 | 0 | 1 |
| Age | Unknown | | | 45 |
| All | | 410 | 124 | 578 |
Source: Stats in N. Macedonia

=== Testing ===
==== Number of daily tests and positive cases ====
View source data.

== Aid ==
=== International aid ===
The countries and international organizations that have sent aid and funds to the Government of North Macedonia, to help fight the pandemic:

- European Union sent ventilators, masks, gloves, testing kits and also secured 66 million euros for the Macedonian government, to help with the crisis.
- Serbia donated vaccines.
- Bulgaria donated medical equipment.
- Turkey donated 50,000 masks, 1,000 protective bodysuits and 1,000 COVID-19 testing kits.
- Slovenia donated 100,000 protective gloves, 100,000 protective masks as well as other medical equipment worth 110,000 euros.
- Czech Republic donated 1,000,000 face masks.
- Norway donated 180,000 euros worth medical equipment to the Macedonian health care system.
- Qatar donated 500,000 surgical masks, 90,000 medical masks and other medical equipment.
- China donated 5,000 COVID-19 testing kits and other medical supplies.
- United States donated 1.1 million dollars aimed at expanding the capacity and improving the capabilities of combating the COVID-19 pandemic. On 29 April, The U.S. donated an additional 330,000 dollars to support vulnerable groups during the pandemic in North Macedonia.

=== Personal donations ===
- Macedonian software company Nextsense, which has become the first company in the Western Balkans to launch a contact-tracing app to tackle the spread of COVID-19, donated all its made money to the Government of North Macedonia. StopKorona! has gone live on 13 April, as a Bluetooth-based smartphone app that warned users if they had come into contact with someone who was tested positive for the novel coronavirus, based on the distance between their mobile devices.

== See also ==
- COVID-19 pandemic by country and territory
- COVID-19 pandemic in Europe
- COVID-19 pandemic
- COVID-19 vaccine
- COVID-19 testing
- COVID-19 drug development
- COVID-19
- Coronavirus
