= Philippe II =

Philippe II may refer to:

- Philippe II of France (1165–1223)
- Philippe II de Croÿ (1496–1549)
- Philippe II, Duke of Orléans (1674–1723)

== See also ==
- Philip II (disambiguation)
