= Philip II =

Philip II may refer to:

- Philip II of Macedon (382–336 BC)
- Philip II (emperor) (238–249), Roman emperor
- Philip II, Prince of Taranto (1329–1374)
- Philip II, Duke of Burgundy (1342–1404)
- Philip II, Duke of Savoy (1438–1497)
- Philip II of France (1165–1223)
- Philip II of Navarre (1293–1322)
- Philip II, Metropolitan of Moscow (1507–1569)
- Philip II of Spain (1527–1598)
- Philip II, Margrave of Baden-Baden (1559–1588)
- Philip II of Portugal (1578–1621)
- Philip II, Count of Schaumburg-Lippe (1723–1787)
- Philip II Philoromaeus (65–64 BC)

== Other uses ==
- Philip II (hospital), in the Republic of North Macedonia
- Walls of Philip II, the City Walls built by Philip II of Spain in Madrid

== See also ==
- Philippe II (disambiguation)
