= Venko Filipče =

Macedonian neurosurgeon and politician

- Венко Филипче
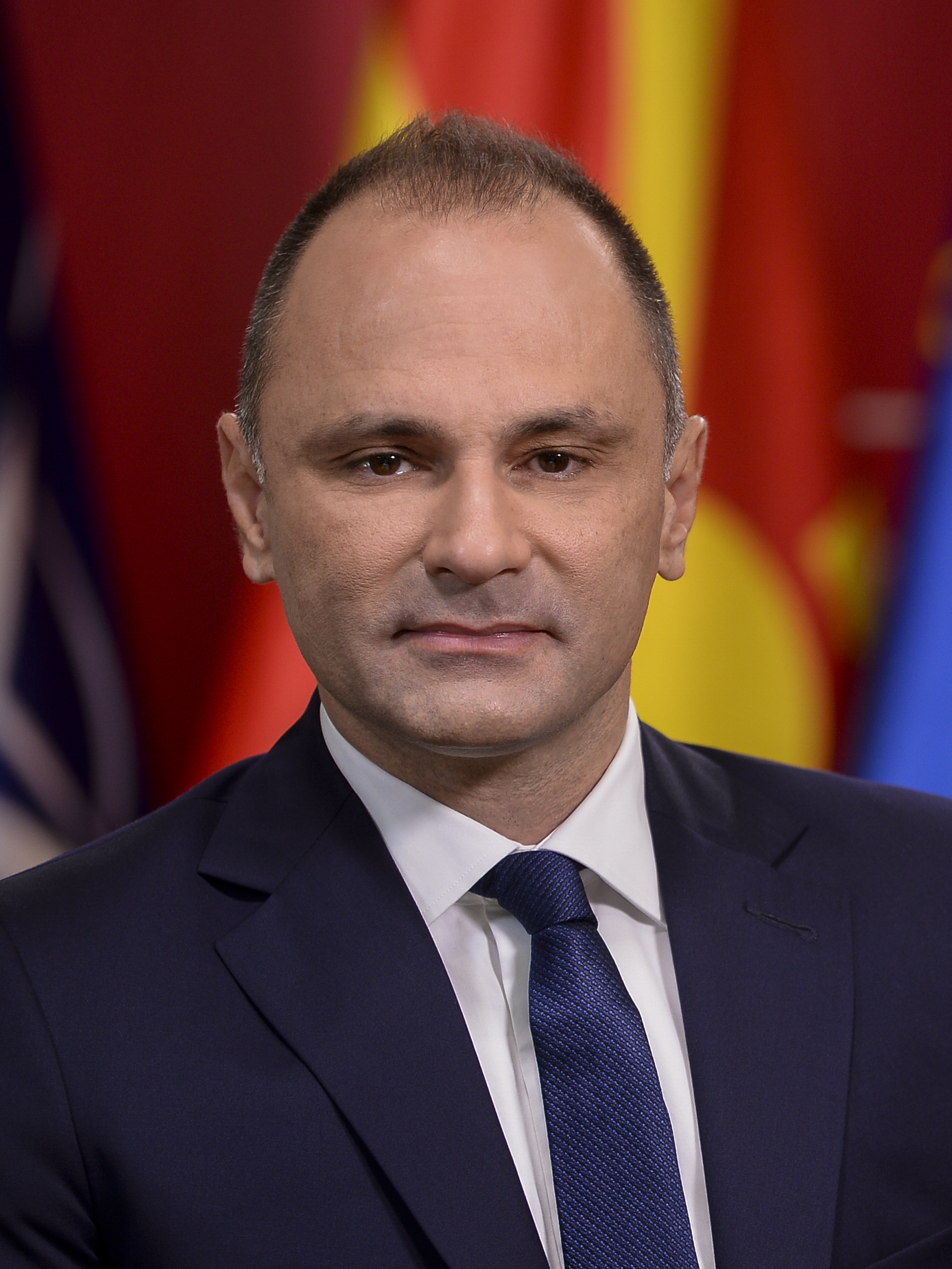
- Official portrait, 2020

Leader of the Opposition
- Incumbent
- Assumed office 30 June 2024
- Prime Minister: Hristijan Mickoski
- Preceded by: Hristijan Mickoski

Leader of the Social Democratic Union
- Incumbent
- Assumed office 30 June 2024
- Preceded by: Dimitar Kovačevski

Minister of Health
- In office 25 December 2017 – 17 January 2022
- Preceded by: Arben Taravari
- Succeeded by: Bekim Sali

Personal details
- Born: 13 June 1977 (age 49) Skopje, SR Macedonia, SFR Yugoslavia
- Party: Social Democratic Union of Macedonia
- Education: Ss. Cyril and Methodius University of Skopje

Venko Filipče (Note: Macedonian: Венко Филипче, pronounced [ˈvɛŋkɔ fiˈlipt͡ʃɛ]) (born 13 June 1977) is a Macedonian neurosurgeon, former health minister of North Macedonia from 2017 to 2022, and the president of the Social Democratic Union of Macedonia. He served as the health minister during the COVID-19 pandemic in North Macedonia. In addition to his work as a surgeon and health minister, Filipče has also published scientific articles in medical neurosurgical journals.

== Early life and education ==
Venko Filipče was born on 13 June 1977 in Skopje. He is the son of Ilija Filipče, a Macedonian doctor and a professor, who served as the minister of health of the Republic of Macedonia in the period between 1994 and 1997. Venko Filipče finished his high school in Skopje in 1995. He obtained his diploma from the Medical faculty of Ss. Cyril and Methodius University of Skopje in 2001 and became an assistant in 2004. His specialization in neurosurgery started in 2003 and finished in 2008. Filipče obtained his Master's degree in neurosurgery in 2011 and his doctor's thesis, titled "Evaluation of adequate timing for the treatment of ruptured intracranial aneurysms" in 2015.

In addition to his PhD, Filipče also studied for a year at Ohio State University and Dayton, Ohio in the field of neurosurgery. He also received training in endovascular techniques in neurosurgery at medical centers in Ljubljana, Istanbul, Zürich, Graz and Belgrade. In 2012, he obtained a fellowship in interventional neuroradiology.

== Career ==
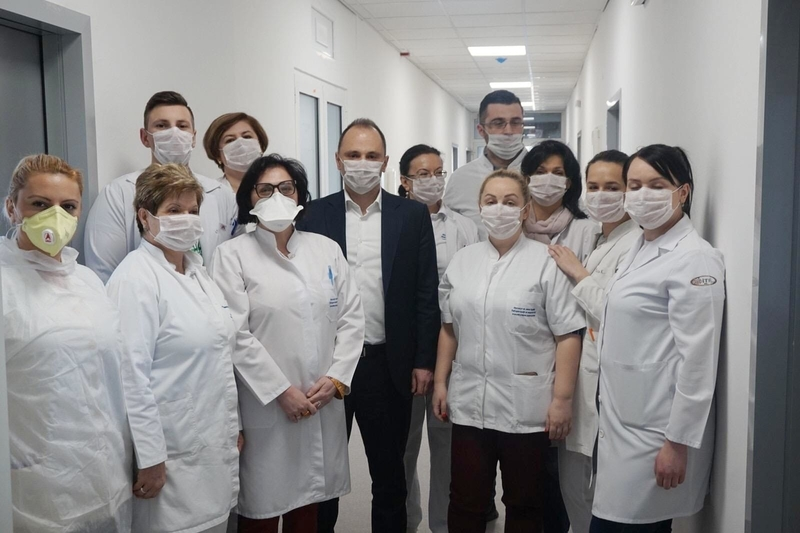
Filipče visiting the National Institute of Public Health in Skopje during the COVID-19 pandemic.

Filipče has published several scientific studies as the leading author in a variety of neurosurgical journals. He serves as the Secretary of the Macedonian Neurosurgical Association and the Association of Neurosurgeons of Southeastern Europe.

Before starting his mandate as the health minister of North Macedonia in December 2017, Filipče was a health counselor to prime minister Zoran Zaev and worked as a professor at the Medical Faculty in Skopje. He is a pioneer in the field of neurovascular techniques used in the treatment of vascular anomalies in the brain.

Filipče served as the Health Minister during the COVID-19 pandemic in North Macedonia, which gave him a lot of exposure during his frequent public appearances and press conferences.

On 10 September 2021, following a fire incident at a modular COVID unit in Tetovo in which 14 patients lost their lives, Filipče announced a written resignation to the PM due to "moral reasons".

On 30 June 2024, he became the president of the Social Democratic Union of Macedonia.

== Personal life ==
Filipče is married and has one son.

== List of published articles ==
- Filipce, V; Pillai, P; Makiese, O; Zarzour, H; Pigott, M; Ammirati, M (2009). "Quantitative and qualitative analysis of the working area obtained by endoscope and microscope in various approaches to the anterior communicating artery complex using computed tomography-based frameless stereotaxy: a cadaver study". Neurosurgery. 65 (6): 1147–52, discussion 1152-3. doi:10.1227/01.NEU.0000359328.90826.97. PMID 19934974. S2CID 7806633.
- Filipce, V; Ammirati, M (2015). "Quantitative and qualitative analysis of the working area obtained by endoscope and microscope in pterional and orbitozigomatic approach to the basilar artery bifurcation using computed tomography based frameless stereotaxy: A cadaver study". Asian Journal of Neurosurgery (10). doi:10.4103/1793-5482.14506 (inactive 12 July 2025).
- Baltsavias, G; Valavanis, A; Filipce, V; Khan, N (2014). "Selective and superselective angiography of pediatric moyamoya disease angioarchitecture: the anterior circulation". Interventional Neuroradiology. 20 (4): 391–402. doi:10.15274/INR-2014-10050. PMC 4187433. PMID 25207900.
- Baltsavias, G; Khan, N; Filipce, V; Valavanis, A (2014). "Selective and superselective angiography of pediatric moyamoya disease angioarchitecture in the posterior circulation". Interventional Neuroradiology. 20 (4): 403–412. doi:10.15274/INR-2014-10041. PMC 4187434. PMID 25207901.
- Filipce, V; Caparoski, A (2015). "The Effects of Vasospasm and ReBleeding on the Outcome of Patients with Subarachnoid Hemorrhage from Ruptured Intracranial Aneurysm" (36). Macedonian Academy of Sciences and Arts: Medical department.

Party political offices
Preceded by Dimitar Kovačevski	Leader of the Social Democratic Union; 2024–present	Incumbent
Political offices
Preceded by Arben Taravari	Minister of Health; December 2017 – January 2022	Succeeded by Bekim Sali
