= Filip II Hospital, Skopje =

Zan Mitrev Clinic

Geography
- Location: Skopje, Karpoš municipality, North Macedonia
- Coordinates: 42.004324°N 21.403222°E

Organisation
- Type: Specialist

Services
- Speciality: Cardiovascular surgery

History
- Opened: March 2000

Links
- Website: zmc.mk
- Lists: Hospitals in North Macedonia

Special Hospital for Surgical Diseases Zan Mitrev Clinic (Macedonian: Специјална болница по хируршки болести "Жан Митрев Клиника"; Specijalna bolnica po hirurški bolesti "Zan Mitrev Klinika") is a special hospital for cardiovascular surgery in Skopje, North Macedonia. It is located inside the building of the military hospital in the Karpoš municipality of Skopje and is the only hospital of its kind in the country. It was opened in March 2000.
