= Bosniaks of Slovenia =

Ethnic group

Bosniaks in Slovenia Bošnjaki v Sloveniji Bošnjaci u Sloveniji
- Ethnic flag of Bosniaks in Slovenia

Total population
- 21,542 (2002)

Regions with significant populations
- Ljubljana, Jesenice

Languages
- Bosnian, Slovene

Religion
- Predominantly Sunni Islam

Related ethnic groups
- Other Bosniaks, Slovenes and other South Slavic peoples

Bosniaks are an ethnic group living in Slovenia. According to the last census from 2002, the total number of Bosniaks in Slovenia was 21,542 as they comprised 1.6% of the total population of Slovenia. According to the last census, they are the third largest minority ethnic group in Slovenia, after Serbs and Croats.

== Geography ==
Bosniaks in Slovenia primarily live in the capital city of Slovenia; Ljubljana. There are dispersed populations of Bosniaks living in various cities and towns in Slovenia, though most choose to live in Ljubljana. Many Bosniaks have left Slovenia for other Western countries and Bosnia. Bosniaks make up a tiny percentage of Slovenia's population, however today, many Bosniaks have retained their identity and culture.

== History ==
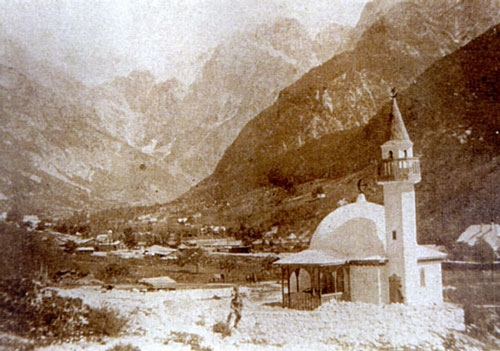
The first Bosniak mosque in Slovenia was built in 1916 in Log pod Mangartom on the slopes of the Alps.

During the First World War, a Bosniak regiment made up primarily of Bosnian Muslims was sent to fight on the Italian front. One of the soldiers who fought there was a boy called Elez Dervišević, the youngest soldier to fight in the Soca battle in World War I. Elez was 11 years old when he served in the Austro-Hungarian Army. In Log pod Mangartom there is a statue of Elez's father dedicated to him.

Many Bosniaks have emigrated to Slovenia from their native Bosnia since the 1960s, primarily due to economic factors and chances for better employment. At the time, it was noted that most of the general Slovenian population looked down on their neighbors from other Yugoslav republics, but among others, Bosniaks and Serbs were the most disliked and unwelcomed. This mindset would continue well after the break-up of Yugoslavia, as Slovenia was the only member-country of the EU to oppose Croatia's EU bid, despite Croats and Slovenes historically sharing more cultural and traditional values than any other southern Slavic nations (such as being the only predominant Catholic nations in the former Yugoslavia). Slovenians grouped Bosniaks with Serbians, Croatians and Macedonians. These groups were often called južnjaki (southerners), ta spodni (those from down there), čefurj, and Švedi (Swedes), all had negative connotations.

== Religion ==
Today, the majority of Bosniaks are predominantly Sunni Muslim and adhere to the Hanafi school of thought, or law, the largest and oldest school of Islamic law in jurisprudence within Sunni Islam.

== Notable people ==
- Kenan Bajrić, footballer
- Muamer Vugdalić, footballer
- Samir Handanović, footballer
- Jasmin Handanović, footballer
- Jasmin Kurtić, footballer
- Edo Murić, basketball player
- Dino Murić, basketball player
- Mirza Begić, basketball player
- Alen Omić, basketball player
- Emir Preldžić, basketball player
- Rašid Mahalbašić, basketball player for Austria
- Adnan Bešić, footballer
- Suad Fileković, footballer
- Fuad Gazibegović, footballer
- Hasan Rizvić, basketball player
- Aris Zarifović, footballer
- Haris Vučkić, footballer
- Alen Vučkić, footballer
- Miral Samardžić, footballer
- Bekim Kapić, footballer
- Amir Dervišević, footballer
- Mustafa Bešić, former ice hockey player
- Armin Bačinović, footballer
- Jasmin Hukić, basketball player
- Teoman Alibegović, former basketball player
- Amar Alibegović, basketball player
- Amir Karić, football player
- Sven Karič, football player
- Selma Skenderović, writer, poet
- Dalila Jakupović, tennis player
- Lina Kuduzović, singer

== See also ==
- Bosniak diaspora
- Demographics of Slovenia
