= Elez =

Elez is a given name and a surname. Notable people with the name include:

== Given name ==
- Elez Dervišević (1901–1988), Bosniak soldier in Austro-Hungarian service
- Elez Isufi (1861–1924), Albanian military leader in the Albanian resistance against the Kingdom of Serbs, Croats, and Slovenes (later Yugoslavia)
- Elez Koçi (1856–1916), Albanian leader of a revolt against the Ottoman Empire and later resistance to Bulgarian occupation

== Surname ==
- Ivan Elez (born 1981), Croatian footballer
- Josip Elez (born 1994), Croatian footballer
- Kristina Elez (born 1987), Croatian handball player
- Marko Elez (born 1999/2000), American software engineer and government employee

== See also ==
- Elez Han (lit. 'Inn of Elez'), a town in Kosovo named after a caravanserai
- Elezović
