= Biščević =

Biščević is a surname. Notable people with the name include:

- Bulend Biščević (born 1975), Bosnian footballer
- Hidajet Biščević (born 1951), Croatian diplomat of Bosniak descent
- Husejin Biščević (1884-?), Bosnian military officer in the 13th Waffen Mountain Division of the SS Handschar (1st Croatian)
