= Battle of Monte San Michele =

- Part of Italian Front (World War I)
Date	June – July 1915
Location	Monte San Michele
Result	Austro-Hungarian victory

Belligerents
Italy	Austria-Hungary

Commanders and leaders
Luigi Cadorna	Svetozar Borojević

The Battle of Monte San Michele was fought between the Austro-Hungarian Army and the Royal Italian Army on the Italian Front in World War I.

== First attack on Monte San Michele ==
In June 1915 in the midst of the difficult Battle of Isonzo against the Italians, the 2nd Bosnian-Herzegovinian Regiment was sent to assist the 1st Mountain Brigade of the Austro-Hungarian Army. After a fierce artillery-infantry attack by the Italians on two important elevations (812 and 653), the Austro-Hungarian battalion that defended the said area took heavy losses. Considering that the Bosnian soldiers in the Austro-Hungarian army were considered to be proven and brave soldiers and they were certainly the most feared by the Italians, 3 battalions of the 2nd Bosnian-Herzegovinian regiment were withdrawn and sent to the east of the Plava River, in order to strengthen the line that was threatened after the Italian penetration. The Bosniak soldiers managed to break through to a new position without any losses. A real problem arose for the Bosniaks when they noticed that the well-fortified trenches were completely leveled due to the action of the Italian artillery. it was ordered to take possession of the shallow hollows created by the action of enemy missiles. The Bosniaks spent the whole day in such trenches enduring constant artillery fire, which took the first victims, but they did not leave their position. Moreover, overnight they eliminated a group of Italian scouts who tried to cut the repaired wire obstacles. On June 23, under the protection of searchlights, the Italians crawled to the first lines of the Austro-Hungarians, At first the Bosniaks let them approach them only a few meters, and then they rained hand grenades on them, after which they jumped out of improvised trenches and entered into hand-to-hand combat. After a gruesome collision, the resistance of the Italians was completely broken, after which they began to flee down the slope towards their starting positions, after that the Bosniaks struck the Italian forces with all their ferocity with machine guns. Despite the strict order not to go towards the enemy, a group of Bosniaks pursued of the Italians.

== Second attack on Monte San Michele ==
One month after, on 20 July 1915, the Italians attacked Monte San Michele again. It was clear that the Bosniaks would be used in the battle, as they were the most reliable element of the Austro-Hungarian army. The 3rd Battalion of the 2nd Bosnian-Herzegovinian Regiment under the command of Major Ružić was assigned to the 12th Mountain Brigade. Without hesitation, the brigade was ordered to launch a counterattack against the Italians. The command was that only the 3rd Battalion directly attacks the hilltop. The Bosniaken emerged from the darkness and soon reached the Italian trenches, yelling their battle cry, "Živio Austrija". One company from the 3rd Battalion was able to cross the first ditch and with that forced many Italian forces to retreat from the northern edge, at the same time other Austro-Hungarian forces managed to capture the first lines of the opponent. A fierce fight developed at elevation 275 where the Italians dug in behind stone blocks. But with an undiminished fighting spirit, the Bosniaks pushed forward and with heavy losses reached the stone fortifications, the fight was quickly finished with the win of the Bosniak forces. The only reason the Italians were not pushed completely back to the Isonzo was because the Austrians had no reserves left. The Battle was still not finished and the next task was to launch an attack on the retreating Italians who were leaving Monte San Michele via the western slope. The retreating army stopped only on the banks of the Isonzo River. Early in the morning, on July 22, the 2nd Bosnian-Herzegovinian Regiment, launched an attack. The plan was to push the Italians back across the river in the direction of Sdrausin and Peren. Under very strong enemy fire, the Bosniaks reached the lowlands. However, in the first attack, the Italians stopped the Austro-Hungarian army and surrounded their smaller groups which were destroyed. To prevent the worst, they had to retreat and be content with taking the top of the hill to begin with. On the wing was the commander of the machine gun section of the 3rd battalion of the 2nd Bosnian-Herzegovinian Regiment, Gojkomir Glogovac, who successfully repelled the attack, meeting the Italians at about 200 meters. This officially ended the battle for Monte San Michele and the weakened and exhausted 3rd Battalion was transferred to the much calmer Carinthian-Italian border in order to stabilize it.
