= Dervišević =

Dervišević is a South Slavic surname. Notable people with the surname include:

- Amir Dervišević (born 1992), Slovenian football midfielder
- Elez Dervišević (1901–1988), Bosniak soldier of the Austro-Hungarian Army
- Aldina Dervisevic (born 2001), Luxembourgish footballer
