= Demographic history of Slovenia =

This article presents the Demographic history of Slovenia, with census results where available. See Demographics of Slovenia for a more detailed overview of the current demographics from 2002 census.

== Pre WW1 ==
There are censuses for the years 1830, 1857, and 1869. Population censuses were then carried out every ten years, in 1880, 1890, 1900, 1910, 1921, and 1931.

=== 1830 ===
Slovenia was divided between the Austrian regions of Carniola, Austrian Littoral, Styria and Carinthia, not counting the Hungarian-owned Prekmurje region. In Styria, there were 342,013 Slovenians, or 38.72% of the population .

=== Second half of 19th century ===
As a result of the rise of German nationalism, which entailed germanizing school networks, economic coercion, and language shift for economic or social reasons, the number of Slovenians in Slovenia went from 96% in 1846, 85.5% in 1880, 84.6% in 1890 and 87.3% in 1900 to 81.7% in 1910. These developments were particularly visible in southern Carinthia, today mostly a part of Austria, largely due to the developing tourist industry on the lakes of the Klagenfurt basin. Similar developments took place in the Prekmurje region, which was then a part of Royal Hungary, with Hungarian replacing German as the prestigious language.

== 1910 ==
Data shows the following results...

- 82% Slovenians
- 10% Germans (106,000)
- 2% Italians
- 1.5% Hungarians

== Interwar period ==
=== 1921 ===
In the first census of the former Yugoslavia in 1921. The area of the Drava Banovina had the following groups... they were counted according to their mother tongue... 1,054,919 total, of which the following language groups were...

- 980,222 Slovenian
- 41,514 German
- 14,429 Hungarian
- 11,898 Serbian and Croatian
- 2,941 Czech and Slovak
- 1,630 Russian
- 701 Italian
- others

=== 1931 ===
In Yugoslavia in 1931 only religious groups were counted. The Drava Banovina had... 1,144,298 total, of which...

- 1,107,155 Catholic
- 25,717 Lutheran/Protestant
- 6,745 Orthodox
- 927 Islam
- 3,754 others

== Post WWII ==
=== 1948 ===
1,391,873 total, of which...

- 1,350,149 (97.00%) Slovenians
- 16,069 (1.15%) Croats
- 10,579 (0.76%) Hungarians
- 7,048 (0.51%) Serbs

=== 1953 ===
1,466,425 total, of which...

- 1,415,448 (96,52%) Slovenians
- 17,978 (1.26%) Croats
- 11,225 (0.76%) Serbs
- 11,019 (0.75%) Hungarians
- 1,663 (0.11%) Romani people
- 1,617 (0.75%) ethnic Muslims
- 1,356 (0.09%) Montenegrins
- others

=== 1961 ===
1,591,523 total, of which...

- 1,522,248 (95.65%) Slovenians
- 31,429 (1.97%) Croats
- 13,609 (0.85%) Serbs
- 10,498 (0.66%) Hungarians
- 2,784 (0.17%) Yugoslavs
- 1,384 (0.09%) Montenegrins
- 1,009 (0.06%) Macedonians
- 13,425 (0.71%) ethnic Muslims
- others

=== 1971 ===
1,727,137 total, of which...

- 1,624,029 (94.03%) Slovenians
- 42,657 (2.47%) Croats
- 20,521 (1.19%) Serbs
- 9,785 (0.57%) Hungarians
- 6,744 (0.39%) Yugoslavs
- 3,231 (0.19%) ethnic Muslims
- 1,978 (0.11%) Montenegrins
- 1,613 (0.09%) Macedonians
- 1,281 (0.07%) Albanians
- others

=== 1981 ===
1,891,864 total, of which...

- 1,712,445 (94.03%) Slovenians
- 55,625 (2.94%) Croats
- 42,182 (2.23%) Serbs
- 26,263 (1.39%) Yugoslavs
- 13,425 (0.71%) ethnic Muslims
- 9,496 (0.50%) Hungarians
- 3,288 (0.17%) Macedonians
- 3,217 (0.17%) Montenegrins
- 1,985 (0.10%) Albanians
- 1,435 (0.08%) Romani people
- others

=== 1991 ===
1,913,355 total, of which...

- 1,689,657 (88.30%) Slovenians
- 52,876 (2.76%) Croats
- 47,401 (2.47%) Serbs
- 26,577 (1.38%) ethnic Muslims
- 12,075 (0.63%) Yugoslavs
- 8,000 (0.41%) Hungarians
- others

== Post Independence ==
=== 2002 ===
1,964,036 total, of which...

- 1,631,363 (83.06%) Slovenians
- 38,964 (1.98%) Serbs
- 35,642 (1.81%) Croats
- 21,542 (1.10%) Bosniaks
- 10,467 (0.53%) ethnic Muslims
- 6,243 (0.32%) Hungarians
- 6,186 (0.31%) Albanians
- others
