= Croats of Slovenia =

The Croats are an ethnic group in Slovenia. In the 2002 census 35,642 citizens of Slovenia identified themselves as Croats while around 54,000 people declared Croatian as their mother tongue, making them second most-populous non-Slovene ethnic group in Slovenia. Despite their centuries-old presence, Croats do not have the status of a national minority.

A significant number of Croats live in larger urban centers such as Ljubljana, Maribor, Velenje, Novo Mesto, Koper, Celje etc.

== History ==
Croats have lived in the Slovene Lands (Bela Krajina, Slovenian part of Istria, Pomurje and around Sutla) for centuries. Most Croats and Slovenes were for centuries part of the same political entities, first the Habsburg Empire and then Yugoslavia. Parts of the modern Slovene territory came under the Axis puppet state of the Independent State of Croatia.

The number of Croats in the territory of modern Slovenia remained relatively small, as the Slovene lands before the 1950s experienced more emigration than immigration. During most of the history, Croats did not constitute a separate community, and many were assimilated by the Slovene, German or Venetian-speaking populations. After World War I, the number of Croats in Slovenia increased significantly, and more numerous communities were present in Ljubljana, Maribor and Celje. In the 1960s, the number of Croats increased significantly again as the result of a wave of relocation from Croatia and Bosnia and Herzegovina. Croats supported the independence of Slovenia at the 1990 Slovenian independence referendum.

== Legal status ==
Unlike two other historic autochthonous minorities of Slovenia, the Hungarians and Italians, the Croats have not been granted minority status, although they are the second largest ethnic minority in Slovenia, after the Serbs (also not granted minority status). According to the Slovenian constitutional framework, only "historical minorities who have been living on clearly defined territories for centuries (and the Romani people, who have formed a distinct community since at least the 13th century can have the status of a minority". This would carry several constitutionally guaranteed rights, such as visible bilingualism and an autonomous educational system. All remaining minority members are guaranteed the right to express and develop freely their cultural and linguistic heritage, under the same laws applying to citizens in general, but lack the positive discrimination policies applied to the three constitutionally recognized minority communities, as well as the right to have state-sponsored schools in their languages.

The recognition of the status of Croats as a national minority in Slovenia has been an open question since 1991, that is, since the formation of the independent Republic of Slovenia. Since then, Croats in Slovenia have been seeking recognition of minority status. Alliance of Croatian Societies in Slovenia expressed this concern in multiple occasions.

== Numbers ==
The number of Slovenian citizens of Croatian origin is difficult to establish. According to the 2001 census, 35,642 of them declared themselves as ethnically ("nationally", according to the Slovenian terminology) Croatian. In the same census, around 54,000 people declared Croatian as their mother tongue. Ten years earlier, more than 52,000 Slovenian citizens declared themselves as ethnically Croatian, while the number of those with Croatian as their mother tongue was around 50,000.

It seems however that the great majority of Croats living in Slovenia uses Slovene as their primary language of communication. In 2001, only around 2,700 people spoke either Croatian or a combination of Croatian and Slovene at home, which is a significant decrease from in 1991, when their number was around 10,000.

Number of self-declared ethnic Croats in Slovenia after World War II:

Number of Croats in Slovenia and their % share of the population between 1948–1991
Slovenia	1948	1953	1961	1971	1981	1991
Croats	16,069 (1.1%)	17,978 (1.2%)	31,429 (3.0%)	42,657 (2.5%)	55,625 (2.9%)	54,212 (2.8%)

- 2002: 35,642 (1.81%)

The registration census from 2011 did not include the collection of data on the nationality and mother tongue of Slovenian residents.

== Culture ==
During the interwar period Hrvatsko društvo »Napredak« (Croatian Society »Progress«) was active in Maribor and Ljubljana.

Thirteen associations of the Croatian community operate under the auspices of the umbrella Alliance of Croatian Societies in Slovenia (Croatian: Savez hrvatskih društava u Sloveniji, SHDS; Slovene: Zveza hrvaških društev v Sloveniji, ZHDS):

- Hrvatsko kulturno društvo Međimurje Ljubljana - folklore ensemble founded in 1996
- Hrvatsko kulturno društvo Pomurje Lendava
- Kulturno društvo Međimurje Velenje
- Hrvatsko kulturno društvo Maribor
- Hrvatsko kulturno-umjetničko društvo Komušina Škofja Loka - founded in 1993 by Croats of Bosnia and Herzegovina
- Hrvatsko kulturno-umjetničko, prosvjetno i sportsko društvo Istra Piran - founded in 1998, folklore, music and klapa ensemble (Klapa Bevanda)
- Hrvatska kulturna udruga Novo Mesto
- Društvo hrvatskih studenata u Sloveniji (Association of Croatian students in Slovenia) - formed in 2007
- Hrvatsko društvo Ljubljana (The Croatian Society of Ljubljana) - formed of three odler associations (Hrvatski kulturni dom - Croatian Cultural Center, Hrvatska Demokratska Zajednica Ljubljana - Croatian Democratic Union of Ljubljana and Hrvatsko društvo Herceg Stjepan - The Croatian Society of Herceg Stjepan) in December 1993
- Međimursko kulturno društvo Ljubljana – Ivan Car - folklore and vocal ensemble, amateur theatrical troupe
- Hrvatsko kulturno društvo Velenje - established in 2014
- Kulturno društvo Matice hrvatske Maribor - branch of Matica hrvatska
- Društvo Žumberčana i prijatelja Žumberka, Metlika

SHDS was established on 13 July 1996 in Ljubljana. It has Zbor (Assembly) consisting of 50 delegates from its members from all parts of Slovenia.

There are also Kulturno umjetničko društvo Žumberak (KUD Žumberak) from Novo Mesto (founded in 1987) and Hrvatski centar kulture Ljubljana. KUD Žumberak founded a local museum collection in 1991 with exhibits from the history of Međimurje and publishes the annual magazine Žumberčan. The tamburitza group "Klasje" is active within the KUD.

Croatian Culture Centre Ljubljana (HCKL) provides several public libraries in Slovenia (Novo Mesto, Grosuplje, Bežigrad) with Croatian literature, in cooperation with Karlovac City library in Croatia. HCKL also organizes concerts and music recitals by Croatian and Slovene musicians, literary evenings and exhibitions of artists from both Croatia and Slovenia and scientific conferences about Croats of Slovenia.

=== Events ===
In 2006, the Croatian Heritage Foundation along with the Federation of Croatian Societies of Slovenia organized the Week of Slovenian Croats in Zagreb as part of the heritage foundation's annual Croatian minority week.

Since 2003, Croatian Society Ljubljana organizes annual cyclist tour ”Way of friendship: Ljubljana–Vukovar” (Put prijateljstva Vukovar - Ljubljana) in remembrance to Croatia-Slovenian friendship and Croatian war veterans. In 2024, route went through Osijek, Našice, Slatina, Đurđevac, Vrbovec, Bjelovar, Virovitica, Zagreb, Samobor, Sveta Nedjelja, Sevnice, Trebnje, Grosuplje, Ljubljana and Vukovar.

== Education ==
Since 2010, the Ministry of Science and Education of Croatia has been organizing Croatian classes in Ljubljana, Lendava, Maribor, Ljutomer, Radomlje and Grosuplje. The exchange tutorship of Croatian language and literature under the jurisdiction of the Ministry of Science and Education operates at the Faculty of Philosophy in Ljubljana.

Croatian Culture Centre Ljubljana provides supplementary teaching of the Croatian language.

== Media ==
Some of the Croatian associations publish their own magazines: Alliance of Croatian Societies in Slovenia - Korijeni (Roots); HKD Maribor – Croata; HKD Međimurje, Ljubljana – Pušlek (Bouquet); HKD Međimurje, Velenje – Štrekar; HKD Pomurje, Lendava – Glas (Voice). The Croatian Catholic Mission in Ljubljana publishes the magazine Izlazak (Exit). From time to time, programs about Croatian students in Slovenia are broadcast on Radio Študent.

== Religion ==
There are Croatian Catholic missions in Ljubljana, Maribor, Novo Mesto and Portorož.

Croatian Catholic mission in Ljubljana serves holy mass in Croatian language since 1969.

== Notable personalities ==
Slovenians of Croat ethnic origin include:

- Srečko Katanec, football player and coach born to Croatian parents
- Jakov Fak, biathlete
- Ivo Brnčić, literary critic
- Izidor Cankar, essayist, art historian, translator and diplomat born to a Croat-German mother
- Robert Kranjec, ski-jumper born to a Croat father
- Josip Iličić, football player
- Željko Ivanek, actor
- Jelko Kacin, politician born to a Croat mother
- Miljenko Licul, designer
- Sandi Lovrić, football player
- Dragutin Mate, politician and diplomat
- Stipe Modrić, former basketball player and coach born to a Croat father
- Duško Pavasovič, chess grandmaster;
- Dijana Ravnikar, biathlete and cross-country skier;
- Josip Ribičič, writer born to a Croat father
- Vanja Rupena, 1996 Miss Croatia
- Goran Sankovič, football player
- Ante Šimundža, former football player born to a Croatian father
- Luka Šulić, cellist, member of the duo 2Cellos born to a Croat father
- Oton Župančič, poet and translator born to a Croat mother
- Jurica Golemac, basketball player and coach

== Reception ==
Slovene poet Fany Hausmann (sl) wrote in her poem Hervatov Zvezda (Croatian Star):

"O blagor vam, Hrvati!
Da Bog vas poživi
in Jelačiča bana,
ki slavo vam množi!"

That would roughly translate as:

"Bless you, Croats!
May God revive you
and Jelačič ban,
who increases your glory!"

== See also ==
- Croatia–Slovenia relations
- Demographics of Slovenia
- Croats
- List of Croats
- Slovenes of Croatia
