= Die Bosniaken kommen =

Military march composed by Austrian Eduard Wagnes in 1895

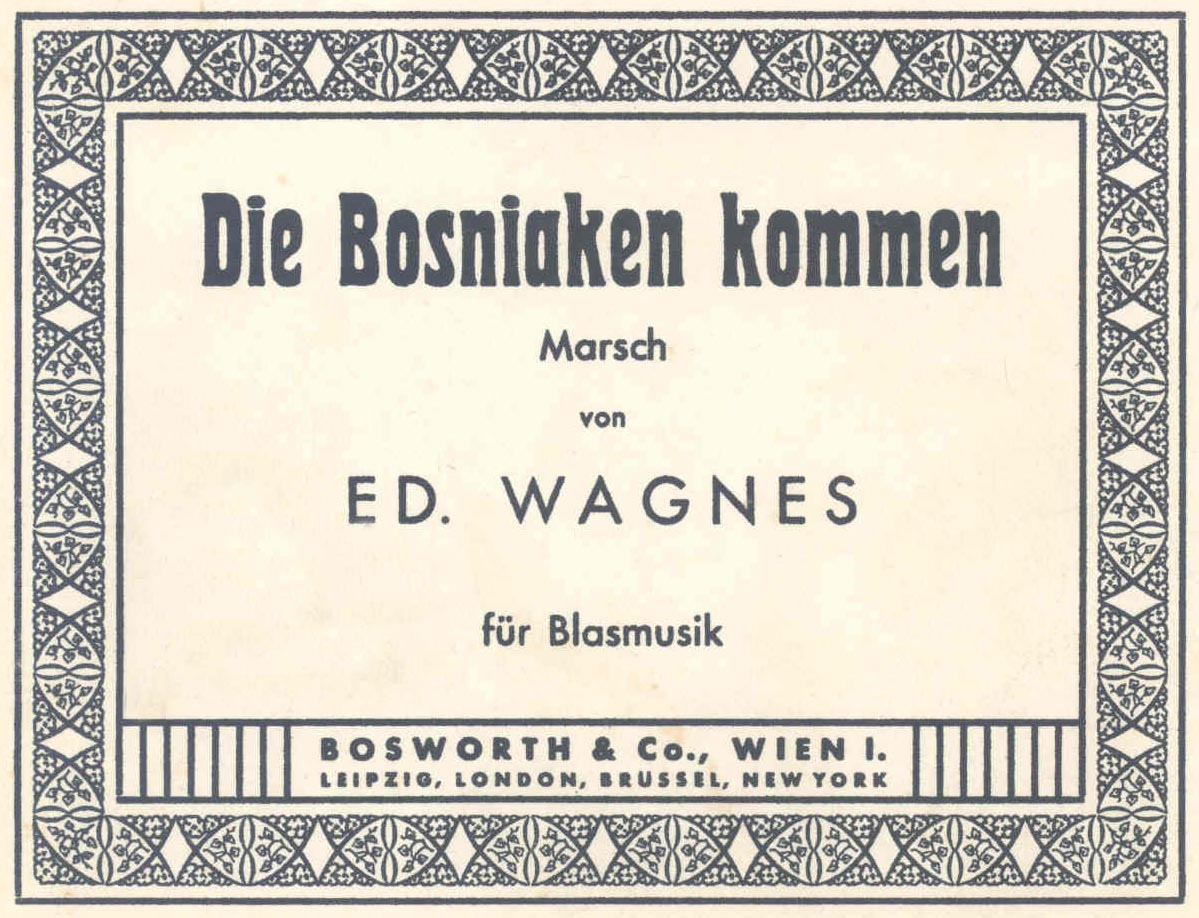
"Die Bosniaken kommen"

"Die Bosniaken kommen" (English: "The Bosniaks are Coming") is a military march, which was composed by Austrian composer Eduard Wagnes in 1895. It was composed in Graz in honour of the soldiers of the Bosnian-Herzegovinian Infantry, who were in the Austro-Hungarian army. This is one of the most popular military marches, and today is played on all military events in Austria.

== See also ==
- Bosnian-Herzegovinian Infantry
- Bosniaks
- Mehter
- World War I
