= Macedonians in Slovenia =

Macedonians in Slovenia Македонци во Словенија Makedonci v Sloveniji
Total population
- 3,972

Regions with significant populations
- Kranj, Ljubljana, Jesenice

Languages
- Macedonian, Slovene

Religion
- Predominantly Eastern Orthodox or Sunni Islam

Related ethnic groups
- Other South Slavs

Macedonians in Slovenia are ethnic Macedonians who reside in Slovenia. According to the official census of 2002, there are 3,972 declared Macedonians in Slovenia, with 4,760 listing Macedonian as their mother tongue.

== Immigration ==
During the years of the Yugoslav federation, many Macedonians migrated to the Socialist Republic of Slovenia. Most of them came from the east of the Socialist Republic of Macedonia and they settled mainly in the town of Kranj and the capital Ljubljana. Macedonian communities can be also found in larger towns such as Jesenice, Nova Gorica, Maribor and Celje. Around 450 Macedonians reside in the Celje region.

== Culture ==
There are three larger cultural associations in Slovenia. The biggest ones are KUD Makedonija from Ljubljana, KUD Kiril i Metodij from Kranj and Kud Biljana from Maribor. They were founded in the 1990s after Slovenia become an independent republic. Cultural Associations were founded to encourage learning of the Macedonian language, heritage and customs for those living in Slovenia. They mainly gather Macedonians for major holidays like Easter, Ilinden and Christmas. Each association has its own center for gatherings and folklore acts. There is also a Macedonian language school in Kranj which is targeted at younger Macedonians.

== Religion ==
Macedonians in Slovenia are predominantly of Orthodox religion. Due to the lack of priests there is only one Macedonian Orthodox Church in Slovenia, which opens only on some occasions; for weekly mass adhererants of the church use the Serbian Orthodox Church. The first Macedonian church organization was the MCO (Македонски црковен одбор/Makedonski crkoven odbor). The first meeting was held on April 13, 1993, where there was talk about establishing a Macedonian Orthodox Church in Slovenia. Good communications have been established between the Macedonian Orthodox Church and Roman Catholic Church, which is the predominant denomination in Slovenia. Many Macedonians also use the Serbian Orthodox Church. The Community was leased the church St.Marija Roženveska which is located in centre of Kranj. It is used by Macedonians only on bigger holidays.

== Media ==
There is just one newspaper which is written for Macedonians in Slovenia called Naše Sonce (Наше Сонце, lit. Our Sun). It is printed by the cultural association of St.Cyril and Methodi whose office is in Kranj. The first edition was printed on December 1, 1997. The newspaper mainly writes about problems and activities of Macedonians living in Slovenia.

== Notable people ==
- Irena Joveva, Member of the European Parliament
- Sašo Filipovski, basketball coach
- Vlado Ilievski, basketball player for Macedonia national team with a Slovenian passport
- Emilija Stojmenova Duh, Minister for Digital Transformation

== See also ==
- North Macedonia–Slovenia relations
- Macedonian diaspora
- Ethnic groups in Slovenia
