= North Macedonia–Slovenia relations =

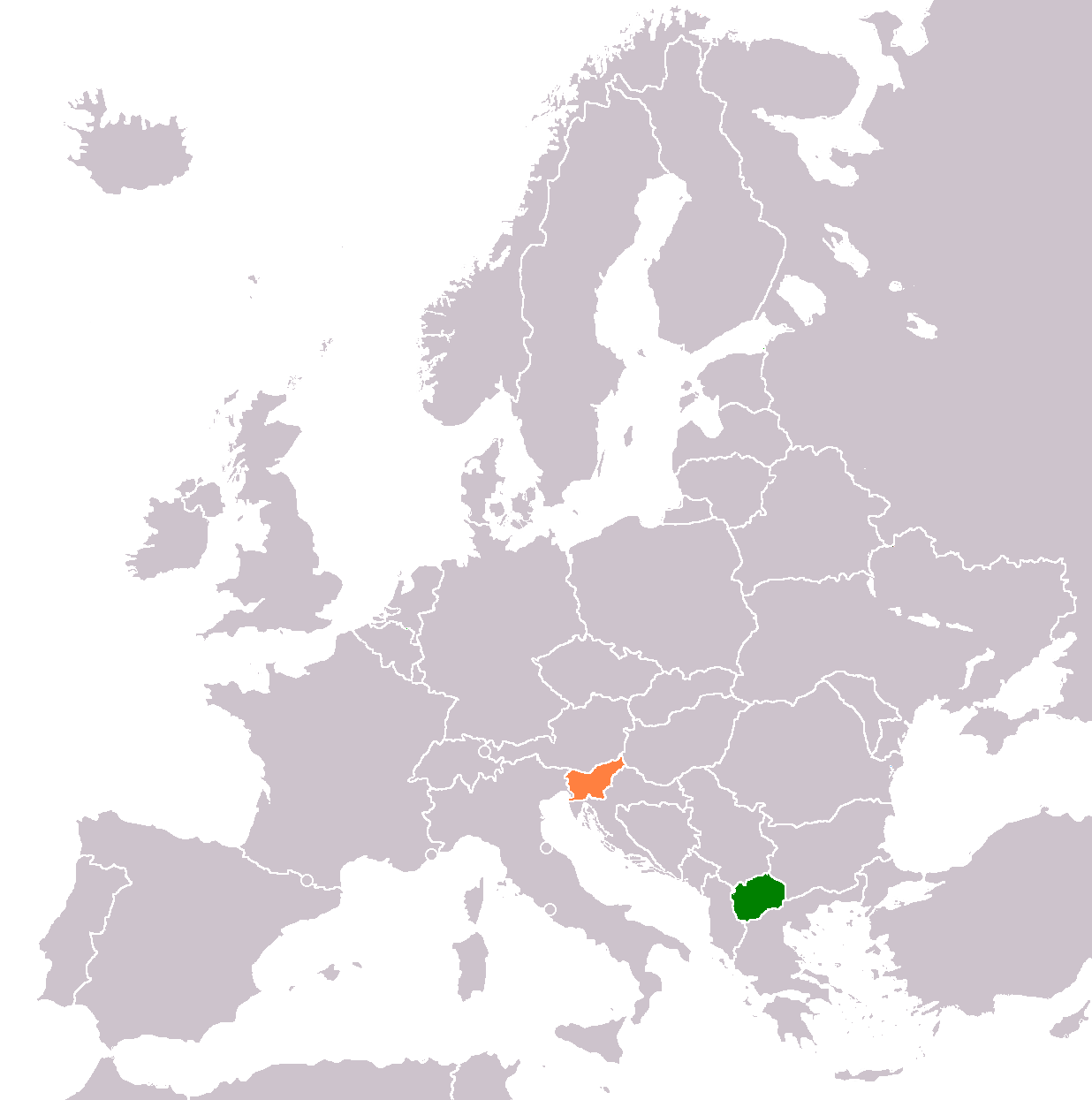

- North Macedonia: Slovenia

North Macedonia–Slovenia relations are the bilateral relations between North Macedonia and Slovenia. Both countries are members of the Council of Europe, and NATO. The two countries have very close political and economic relations. Once part of SFR Yugoslavia, the two republics declared independence in 1991 (Slovenia in June, North Macedonia in September) and recognised each other's independence on 12 February 1992. Diplomatic relations between both countries were established on 17 March 1992. Slovenia supports North Macedonia's sovereignty, territorial integrity, its Euro-integration and visa liberalisation. North Macedonia is a European Union candidate and Slovenia is a European Union member state.

== Economic relations ==
A significant number of Slovenian investments ended up in North Macedonia. In 2007, about 70 million euros were invested. In January 2009, the prime minister of North Macedonia Nikola Gruevski announced, that he expects more Slovenian investments in infrastructure and energy projects. Over 70 Slovenian companies are present on the market of North Macedonia.

== Agreements ==
- Free Trade Agreement
- Agreement on Reciprocal Promotion and Protection of Investments
- Treaty on the Regulation of Reciprocal Property Law Relations and the Convention on the Avoidance of Double Taxation relating to Income and Property Tax

== Resident diplomatic missions ==
- North Macedonia has an embassy in Ljubljana.
- Slovenia has an embassy in Skopje.

== See also ==
- Foreign relations of North Macedonia
- Foreign relations of Slovenia
- Accession of North Macedonia to the EU
- NATO-EU relations
- Macedonians in Slovenia
