= Eduard Wagnes =

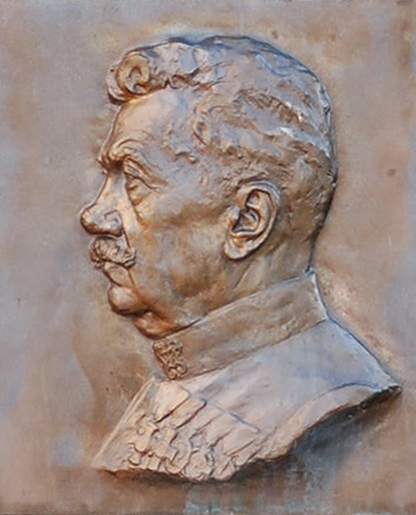
- Eduard Wagnes, composer Park by Pfarrkirche.
- Born: March 18, 1863 (Austrian Empire); Graz, Austrian Empire
- Died: March 27, 1936 (Austria); Bad Gams, (Austria)
- Citizenship: Austria-Hungary
- Known for: "Die Bosniaken Kommen (March)"

Eduard Wagnes (18 March 1863 in Graz, Austria – 27 March 1936 in Bad Gams, Austria) was a conductor in the Austro-Hungarian Military, and composer of military marches. His most famous composition was "Die Bosniaken Kommen", composed in 1895.

== Biography ==
Wagnes was born 18 March 1863 in Austria. His father, a musician and manufacturer brass instruments, taught him to play music. Wagnes was accepted into the Styrian Music Association music school at age 7 and learned the French horn; at age 15, he became first horn player at the Graz City Theater. He was later a solo horn player in Eduard Strauss's orchestra. He served in the Austro-Hungarian Army from 1885 to 1889.

Wagnes was later appointed bandmaster of the second Bosnian infantry regiment, where he composed several marches. The best-known of these, "Die Bosniaken Kommen," was adopted as the regiments' de facto march and remains a popular Austrian composition. He would ultimately write around 300 pieces, primarily marches but also including waltzes, a mass, and three operettas.

Wagnes was admired by Gustav Mahler, who wanted to hire him as a horn player, and by King Ludwig III. He received the Golden Cross of Merit with the Crown, and a street in Graz was named after him.

He died 27 March 1936.

== Compositions ==
- Die Bosniaken kommen - 1895
- Flitsch Marsch - 1928
- Felsenfest für's Vaterland - 1932
- Helden von Meletta - 1932
- Ausseer Buam
- Durch dick und dünn
- Für Freiheit und Ehr
- Hand in Hand
- Heldenhaft Marsch
- Mit eisener Kraft
- Ritterlich
- Zum Schutz und Trutz

=== Dramatic music ===
- 1910 Alt-Wien, operette - libretto: Ferdinand Maierfeld-Enter
- 1911 Die Klosterprinzessin, operette - libretto: Hans Pflanzer
