= Elezović =

Elezović is a South Slavic patronymic surname, meaning "son of Elez". Notable people with the surname include:

- Gligorije Elezović (1879–1960), Serbian historian
- Jovica Elezović (born 1956), Serbian handball player who competed for Yugoslavia
- Pete Elezovic (born 1971), American football player
- Uroš Elezović (born 1982), Serbian handball player

== See also ==
- Elezovići
