= Husejin Biščević =

Bosnian military officer

Husejin Biščević (28 July 1884 – ?) was the highest ranking Bosnian military officer in the 13th Waffen Mountain Division of the SS Handschar (1st Croatian) during World War II.

== Life ==
Little is known of Biščević’s background, except that he had served in the Bosnian Herzegovinian Infantry. He was "a Bosnian Muslim who served in the Austrian army during the First World War".

He was an early volunteer for the Waffen SS Division and was appointed SS Obersturmbannführer (Lieutenant Colonel). He was posted to the Flak Abteilung 13 in August 1943 and acted as a father figure to the younger men. However, he was deemed unsuitable to lead men in combat and replaced on 1 March 1944.

Little is known of his fate after the war.

== Literature ==
- Munoz, Antonio J., editor. The East Came West: Muslim, Hindu and Buddhist Volunteers in the German Armed Forces. (chapters 2 and 13) Bayside, NY: Axis Europa, 2001 ISBN 1-891227-39-4
- Malcolm, Noel (1996). Bosnia: A Short History. New York University Press. ISBN 0-8147-5561-5
- Lepre, George (2000). Himmler's Bosnian Division: The Waffen-SS Handschar Division 1943-1945 Schiffer Publishing. ISBN 0-7643-0134-9
- Stein, George H. (1984). The Waffen SS: Hitler's Elite Guard at War, 1939-45 Cornell University Press. ISBN 0-8014-9275-0
- 13.SS 'Handžar' divizija i njen slom u Istočna Bosni (Istočna Bosna, vol.2, 587)
- Redzic, Enver, Muslimansko Autonomastvo I 13. SS Divizija (Sarajevo: Svjetlost, 1987).
