= Bad Gams =

- Former municipality
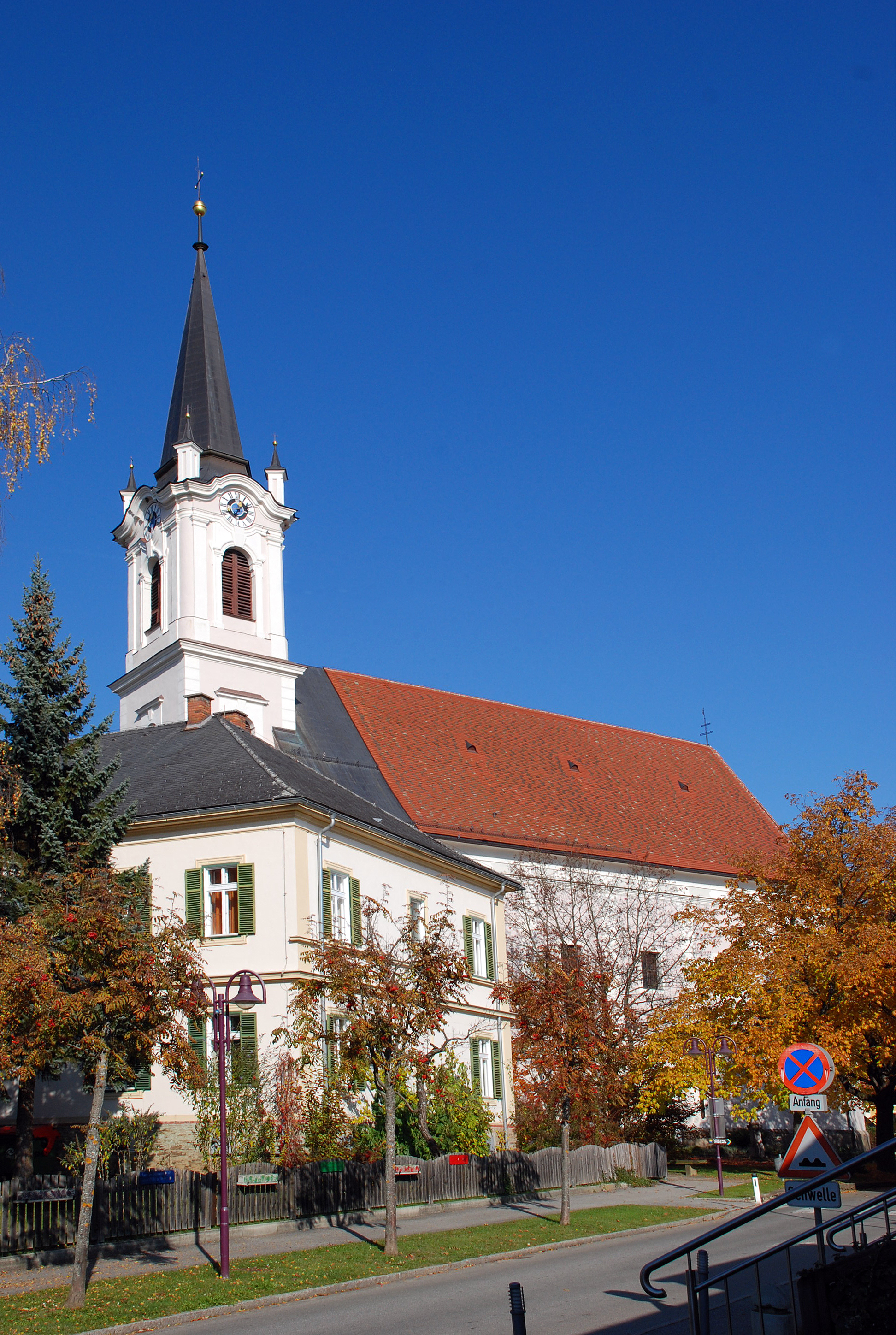
- Bad Gams parish church

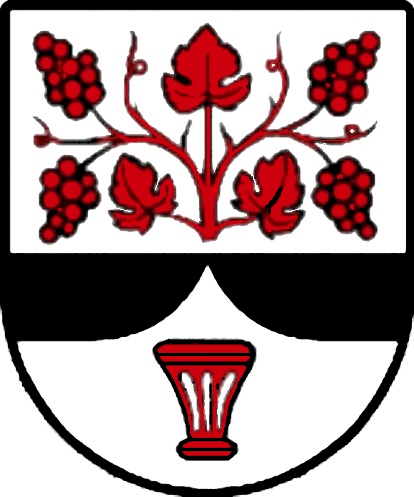
- Coat of arms

- Location within Austria
- Coordinates: 46°52′12″N 15°13′24″E
- Country: Austria
- State: Styria
- District: Deutschlandsberg

Area
  - Total: 48.71 km^{2} (18.81 sq mi)
- Elevation: 430 m (1,410 ft)

Population (1 January 2016)
  - Total: 2,306
  - Density: 47.34/km^{2} (122.6/sq mi)
- Time zone: UTC+1 (CET)
  - Summer (DST): UTC+2 (CEST)
- Postal code: 8524
- Area code: 03463
- Vehicle registration: DL
- Website: www.bad-gams.steiermark.at

Bad Gams is a former municipality and, traditionally, a market town, in the district of Deutschlandsberg in Styria, Austria, roughly 30 km from Graz. Since the 2015 Styria municipal structural reform, it is part of the municipality Deutschlandsberg, together with Deutschlandsberg, Freiland bei Deutschlandsberg, Kloster, Osterwitz and Trahütten.

== Population ==
Historical population
Year	Pop.	±%
1869	2,389	—
1880	2,303	−3.6%
1890	2,292	−0.5%
1900	2,294	+0.1%
1910	2,360	+2.9%
1923	2,217	−6.1%
1934	2,381	+7.4%
1939	2,262	−5.0%
1951	2,378	+5.1%
1961	2,326	−2.2%
1971	2,270	−2.4%
1981	2,218	−2.3%
1991	2,296	+3.5%
2001	2,300	+0.2%
2011	2,289	−0.5%
