= Demographics of Slovenia =

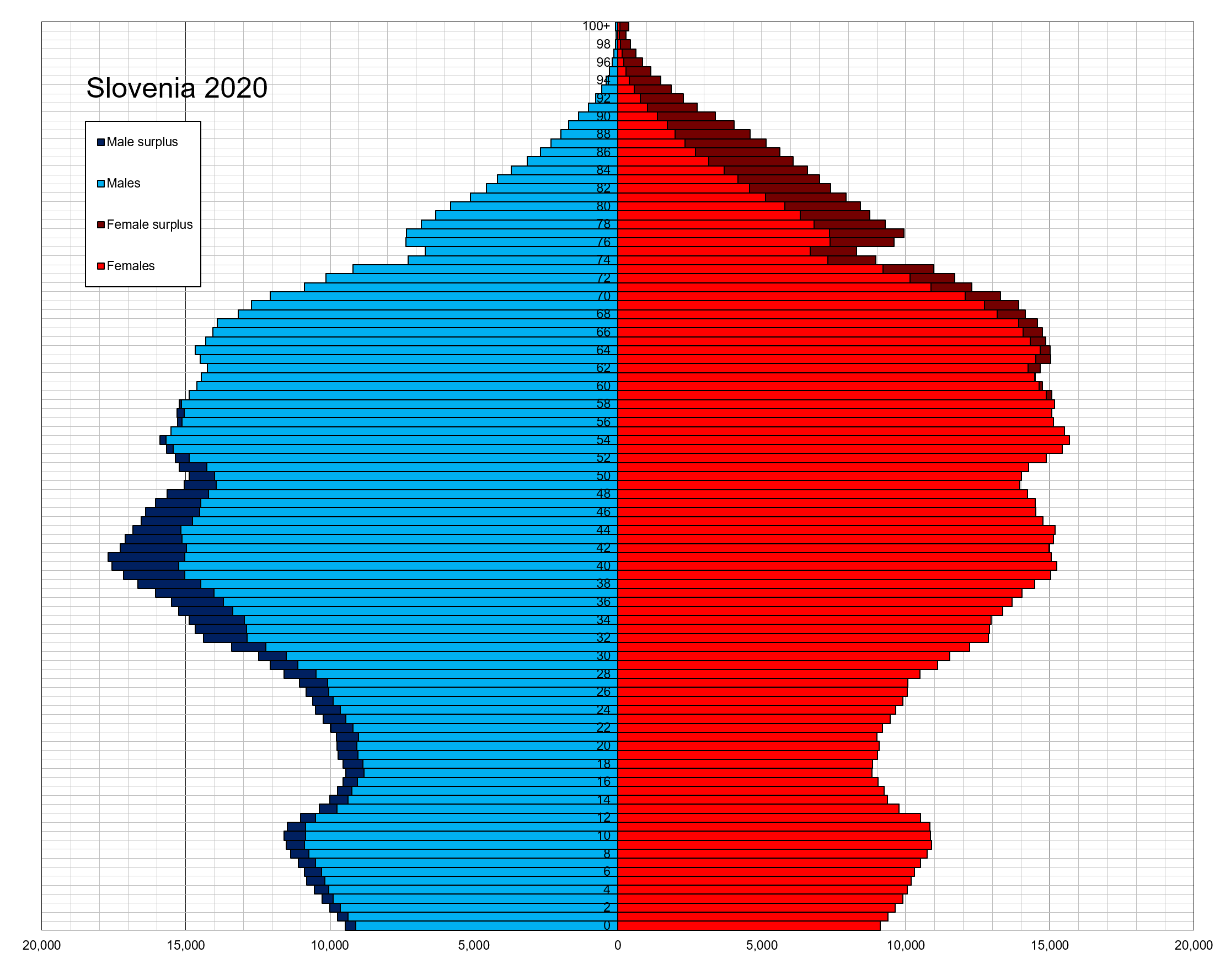
- Population pyramid of Slovenia in 2020
- Population: 2,101,208 (2022 est.)
- Growth rate: ▼0.06% (2022 est.)
- Birth rate: 8.3 births/1,000 population
- Death rate: 10.4 deaths/1,000 population
- Life expectancy: 81.82 years
  - male: 78.96 years
  - female: 84.79 years
- Fertility rate: 1.6 children
- Infant mortality: 1.52 deaths/1,000 live births
- Net migration rate: 1.54 migrant(s)/1,000 population
- Immigrant share: 14.9% (2024)

Sex ratio
- Total: 1 male(s)/female (2022 est.)
- At birth: 1.04 male(s)/female

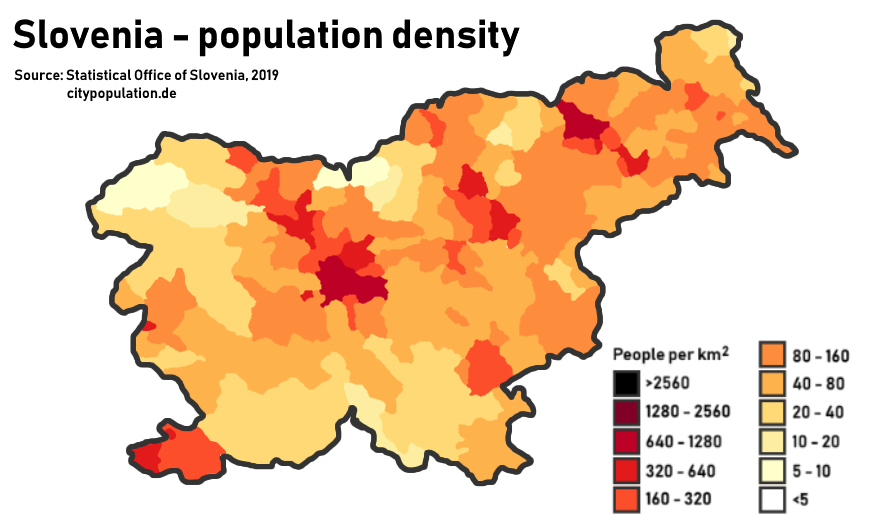
Population density in Slovenia by municipality

Historical population
Year	Pop.	±% p.a.
1857	1,101,854	—
1869	1,128,768	+0.20%
1880	1,182,223	+0.42%
1890	1,234,056	+0.43%
1900	1,268,055	+0.27%
1910	1,321,098	+0.41%
1921	1,304,800	−0.11%
1931	1,397,650	+0.69%
1948	1,439,800	+0.17%
1953	1,504,427	+0.88%
1961	1,591,523	+0.71%
1971	1,727,137	+0.82%
1981	1,891,864	+0.92%
1991	1,913,355	+0.11%
2002	1,964,036	+0.24%
2011	2,050,189	+0.48%
2021	2,108,977	+0.28%

Demographic features of the population of Slovenia include population density, ethnicity, education level, health of the populace, economic status, religious affiliations and other aspects of the population.

With 101 inhabitants per square kilometre (262/sq mi), Slovenia ranks low among the European countries in population density (compared to 402/km^{2} (1042/sq mi) for the Netherlands or 195/km^{2} (505/sq mi) for Italy). The Littoral–Inner Carniola Statistical Region has the lowest population density, and the Central Slovenia Statistical Region has the highest.

According to the 2002 census, Slovenia's main ethnic group are Slovenes (83%). At least 13% of the population were immigrants from other parts of former Yugoslavia, primarily ethnic Bosniaks (Bosnian Muslims), Croats and Serbs and their descendants. They have settled mainly in cities and suburbanised areas. Relatively small but protected by the Constitution of Slovenia are the Hungarian and the Italian national community. A special position is held by the geographically dispersed Roma ethnic community.

Slovenia is among the European countries with the most pronounced ageing of population, ascribable to a low birth rate and increasing life expectancy. Almost all Slovenian inhabitants older than 64 are retired, with no significant difference between the genders. The working-age group is diminishing in spite of immigration. The proposal to raise the retirement age from the current 57 for women and 58 for men was rejected in a referendum in 2011. Also the difference among the genders regarding life expectancy is still significant. In 2007, it was 74.6 years for men and 81.8 years for women. In addition, in 2009, the suicide rate in Slovenia was 22 per 100,000 persons per year, which places Slovenia among the highest ranked European countries in this regard.

== Population ==
Census date	Population	Population density (per km^{2})
1857	1,101,854	54.4
1869	1,128,768	55.7
1880	1,182,223	58.3
1890	1,234,056	60.9
1900	1,268,055	62.5
1910	1,321,098	65.2
1921	1,304,800	64.4
1931	1,397,650	68.9
1948	1,439,800	71.0
1953	1,504,427	74.2
1961	1,591,523	78.5
1971	1,727,137	85.2
1981	1,891,864	93.3
1991	1,913,355	94.4
2002	1,964,036	96.9
2011	2,050,189	101.1
2021	2,108,977	104.0

View source data.
View source data.
View source data.
View source data.

== Vital statistics ==
Source: Statistical Office of the Republic of Slovenia

Notable events in Slovenian demographics:

- 1940–1945: Second World War
- 1991: Independence from Yugoslavia
- 2004: Joined the European Union

	Mid-year population	Live births	Deaths	Natural change	Crude birth rate (per 1000)	Crude death rate (per 1000)	Natural change (per 1000)	Total fertility rate	Female fertile population (15–49 years)
1922	1,310,355	39,346	25,088	14,258	30.0	19.1			
1923	1,318,733	40,710	25,003	15,707	30.9	19.1			
1924	1,328,440	40,215	23,297	16,918	30.3	19.1			
1925	1,338,330	39,476	23,405	16,071	29.5	17.5			
1926	1,347,241	38,267	23,307	14,960	28.4	17.5			
1927	1,355,401	37,794	23,324	14,470	27.9	17.3			
1928	1,363,532	37,359	22,355	15,004	27.4	17.2			
1929	1,370,386	35,201	23,189	12,012	25.7	16.4			
1930	1,378,536	38,346	20,846	17,500	27.8	16.9			
1931	1,389,323	36,851	22,925	13,926	26.5	15.1			
1932	1,397,675	36,832	23,849	12,983	26.4	16.5			
1933	1,407,450	36,832	22,035	12,552	24.6	17.1			
1934	1,418,234	34,587	19,585	13,788	23.5	15.7			
1935	1,427,708	32,433	20,590	11,843	22.7	13.8			
1936	1,436,035	32,630	20,479	12,151	22.7	14.4			
1937	1,441,542	31,520	21,221	10,299	21.9	14.2			
1938	1,444,242	31,199	20,392	10,807	21.6	14.8			
1939	1,447,247	31,251	19,910	11,341	21.6	14.1			
1940	1,450,332	31,536	21,001	10,535	21.7	13.8			
1941	1,452,166	32,456	19,812	12,644	22.3	14.5			
1942	1,448,611	30,681	22,061	8,620	21.2	13.6			
1943	1,440,515	31,434	25,149	6,285	21.8	15.2			
1944	1,430,205	27,379	26,609	770	19.1	17.4			
1945	1,416,312	20,239	28,572	−8,333	14.3	20.2			
1946	1,415,156	28,599	18,145	10,454	20.2				
1947	1,429,266	31,312	18,708	12,604	21.9				
1948	1,443,031	31,538	17,884	13,654	21.9				
1949	1,453,581	33,284	18,838	14,446	22.9				
1950	1,466,881	35,992	17,335	18,657	24.5	11.8	12.7	3.12	389,726
1951	1,480,245	34,819	18,497	16,322	23.5	12.5	11.0	2.98	391,462
1952	1,493,550	34,165	15,617	18,548	22.9	10.5	12.4	2.91	393,199
1953	1,508,428	33,754	14,948	18,806	22.4	9.9	12.5	2.80	394,935
1954	1,521,485	31,828	14,897	16,931	20.9	9.8	11.1	2.58	395,721
1955	1,533,998	32,096	15,109	16,987	20.9	9.8	11.1	2.58	396,506
1956	1,545,591	31,466	16,351	15,115	20.4	10.6	9.8	2.51	397,292
1957	1,556,521	30,086	14,545	15,541	19.3	9.3	10.0	2.38	398,077
1958	1,566,979	28,284	14,082	14,202	18.1	9.0	9.1	2.22	398,863
1959	1,576,204	28,429	15,357	13,072	18.0	9.7	8.3	2.23	399,648
1960	1,580,145	27,825	15,145	12,680	17.6	9.6	8.0	2.18	400,434
1961	1,595,450	28,955	14,013	14,942	18.1	8.8	9.4	2.26	401,219
1962	1,604,980	29,035	15,866	13,169	18.1	9.9	8.2	2.27	406,216
1963	1,614,414	29,174	15,102	14,072	18.1	9.4	8.7	2.28	411,214
1964	1,630,553	29,184	16,729	12,455	17.9	10.3	7.6	2.32	416,211
1965	1,650,413	30,587	15,987	14,600	18.5	9.7	8.8	2.45	421,209
1966	1,669,606	30,941	15,248	15,693	18.5	9.1	9.4	2.48	426,206
1967	1,690,939	29,824	16,353	13,471	17.6	9.7	8.0	2.38	431,203
1968	1,703,708	28,580	17,446	11,134	16.8	10.2	6.5	2.28	436,201
1969	1,714,022	27,883	18,564	9,319	16.3	10.8	5.4	2.17	441,198
1970	1,726,513	27,432	17,354	10,078	15.9	10.1	5.8	2.21	446,196
1971	1,738,101	28,278	17,425	10,853	16.3	10.0	6.2	2.16	451,193
1972	1,751,506	28,713	18,153	10,560	16.4	10.4	6.0	2.14	453,763
1973	1,766,125	29,548	17,614	11,934	16.7	10.0	6.8	2.18	456,332
1974	1,782,470	28,625	17,206	11,419	16.1	9.7	6.4	2.10	458,902
1975	1,800,022	29,786	18,180	11,606	16.5	10.1	6.4	2.16	461,471
1976	1,819,276	30,339	18,157	12,182	16.7	10.0	6.7	2.17	464,041
1977	1,839,358	29,904	17,633	12,271	16.3	9.6	6.7	2.16	466,610
1978	1,862,620	30,354	18,357	11,997	16.3	9.9	6.4	2.19	469,180
1979	1,882,304	30,604	18,148	12,456	16.3	9.6	6.6	2.22	471,749
1980	1,901,208	29,902	18,820	11,082	15.7	9.9	5.8	2.11	474,319
1981	1,917,469	29,220	18,733	10,487	15.2	9.8	5.5	1.96	476,888
1982	1,924,877	28,894	19,647	9,247	15.0	10.2	4.8	1.93	480,333
1983	1,933,104	27,200	20,703	6,497	14.1	10.7	3.4	1.82	482,847
1984	1,942,802	26,274	20,214	6,060	13.5	10.4	3.1	1.75	484,847
1985	1,973,151	25,933	19,854	6,079	13.1	10.1	3.1	1.72	486,852
1986	1,980,718	25,570	19,499	6,071	12.9	9.8	3.1	1.65	489,508
1987	1,989,462	25,592	19,837	5,755	12.9	10.0	2.9	1.64	503,828
1988	1,999,988	25,209	19,126	6,083	12.6	9.6	3.0	1.63	506,828
1989	1,999,404	23,447	18,669	4,778	11.7	9.3	2.4	1.52	508,310
1990	1,998,090	22,368	18,555	3,813	11.2	9.3	1.9	1.46	509,166
1991	2,001,768	21,583	19,324	2,259	10.8	9.7	1.1	1.42	511,191
1992	1,995,832	19,982	19,333	649	10.0	9.7	0.3	1.34	512,506
1993	1,990,623	19,793	20,012	−219	9.9	10.1	−0.1	1.33	511,866
1994	1,988,850	19,463	19,359	104	9.8	9.7	0.1	1.32	511,534
1995	1,987,505	18,980	18,968	12	9.5	9.5	0.0	1.29	514,298
1996	1,991,169	18,788	18,620	168	9.4	9.4	0.1	1.28	516,690
1997	1,986,848	18,165	18,928	−763	9.1	9.5	−0.4	1.25	516,585
1998	1,982,603	17,856	19,039	−1,183	9.0	9.6	−0.6	1.23	516,296
1999	1,985,557	17,533	18,885	−1,352	8.8	9.5	−0.7	1.21	516,261
2000	1,990,272	18,180	18,588	−408	9.1	9.3	−0.2	1.26	515,258
2001	1,992,035	17,477	18,508	−1,031	8.8	9.3	−0.5	1.21	512,358
2002	1,995,718	17,501	18,701	−1,200	8.8	9.4	−0.6	1.21	510,692
2003	1,996,773	17,321	19,451	−2,130	8.7	9.7	−1.1	1.20	507,713
2004	1,997,004	17,961	18,523	−562	9.0	9.3	−0.3	1.25	504,530
2005	2,001,114	18,157	18,825	−668	9.1	9.4	−0.3	1.26	500,449
2006	2,008,516	18,932	18,180	752	9.4	9.1	0.4	1.31	496,853
2007	2,019,406	19,823	18,584	1,239	9.8	9.2	0.6	1.31	491,536
2008	2,022,629	21,817	18,308	3,509	10.8	9.1	1.7	1.53	486,506
2009	2,042,335	21,856	18,750	3,106	10.7	9.2	1.5	1.53	483,681
2010	2,049,261	22,343	18,609	3,734	10.9	9.1	1.8	1.57	479,815
2011	2,052,496	21,947	18,699	3,248	10.7	9.1	1.6	1.56	474,646
2012	2,056,262	21,938	19,257	2,681	10.7	9.4	1.3	1.58	469,442
2013	2,059,114	21,111	19,334	1,777	10.3	9.4	0.9	1.55	463,138
2014	2,061,623	21,165	18,886	2,279	10.3	9.2	1.1	1.58	456,811
2015	2,063,077	20,641	19,834	807	10.0	9.6	0.4	1.57	450,224
2016	2,064,241	20,345	19,689	656	9.9	9.5	0.3	1.58	443,390
2017	2,066,161	20,241	20,509	−268	9.8	9.9	−0.1	1.62	436,478
2018	2,070,050	19,585	20,485	−900	9.5	9.9	−0.4	1.61	430,225
2019	2,089,310	19,328	20,588	−1,260	9.3	9.9	−0.6	1.61	428,255
2020	2,100,126	18,767	24,016	−5,249	8.9	11.4	−2.5	1.60	426,155
2021	2,107,007	18,984	23,261	−4,277	9.0	11.0	−2.0	1.64	425,310
2022	2,108,732	17,627	22,492	−4,865	8.4	10.7	−2.3	1.55	423,301
2023	2,120,937	16,989	21,540	−4,551	8.0	10.2	−2.2	1.51	423,982
2024	2,126,324	16,875	21,506	−4,631	7.9	10.1	−2.2	1.52	424,055
2025	2,130,850	16,961	21,223	−4,262	7.9	10.0	−2.1	1.54	423,920
2026p	2,138,751								

=== Current vital statistics ===
Period	Live births	Deaths	Natural increase
January–September 2025	12,787	15,595	−2,808
January–September 2026	12,704	15,441	−2,737
Difference	▼ –83 (–0.65%)	▼ –154 (–0.99%)	▲ +71

=== Total fertility rates by region ===
2024
Regions	TFR
Southeast Slovenia Statistical Region	1.86
Lower Sava Statistical Region	1.79
Gorizia Statistical Region	1.76
Carinthia Statistical Region	1.73
Savinja Statistical Region	1.63
Upper Carniola Statistical Region	1.61
Eastern Slovenia	1.59
Mura Statistical Region	1.50
Littoral–Inner Carniola Statistical Region	1.47
Western Slovenia	1.46
Drava Statistical Region	1.43
Central Slovenia Statistical Region	1.39
Coastal–Karst Statistical Region	1.30

=== Structure of the population ===
Population by Sex and Age Group (Census 01.I.2021) (Fully register based census.):

Age Group	Male	Female	Total	%
Total	1 059 938	1 049 039	2 108 977	100
0–4	51 230	48 119	99 349	4.71
5–9	56 155	52 767	108 922	5.16
10–14	56 285	53 175	109 460	5.19
15–19	48 450	45 497	93 947	4.45
20–24	55 500	48 158	103 658	4.92
25–29	60 660	52 345	113 005	5.36
30–34	71 309	62 333	133 642	6.34
35–39	79 855	70 219	150 074	7.12
40–44	85 952	75 862	161 814	7.67
45–49	80 250	72 516	152 766	7.24
50–54	76 913	72 888	149 801	7.10
55–59	76 799	75 553	152 352	7.22
60–64	71 998	72 474	144 472	6.85
6569	66 495	70 032	136 527	6.47
70–74	50 200	57 623	107 823	5.11
75–79	32 465	43 273	75 738	3.59
80–84	23 621	37 431	61 052	2.89
85–89	11 656	24 986	36 642	1.74
90–94	3 569	11 129	14 698	0.70
95–99	525	2 429	2 954	0.14
100+	51	230	281	0.01
Age group	Male	Female	Total	Percent
0–14	163 670	154 061	317 731	15.07
15–64	707 686	647 845	1 355 531	64.27
65+	188 582	247 133	435 715	20.66

=== Life expectancy at birth ===
Life expectancy in Slovenia since 1950

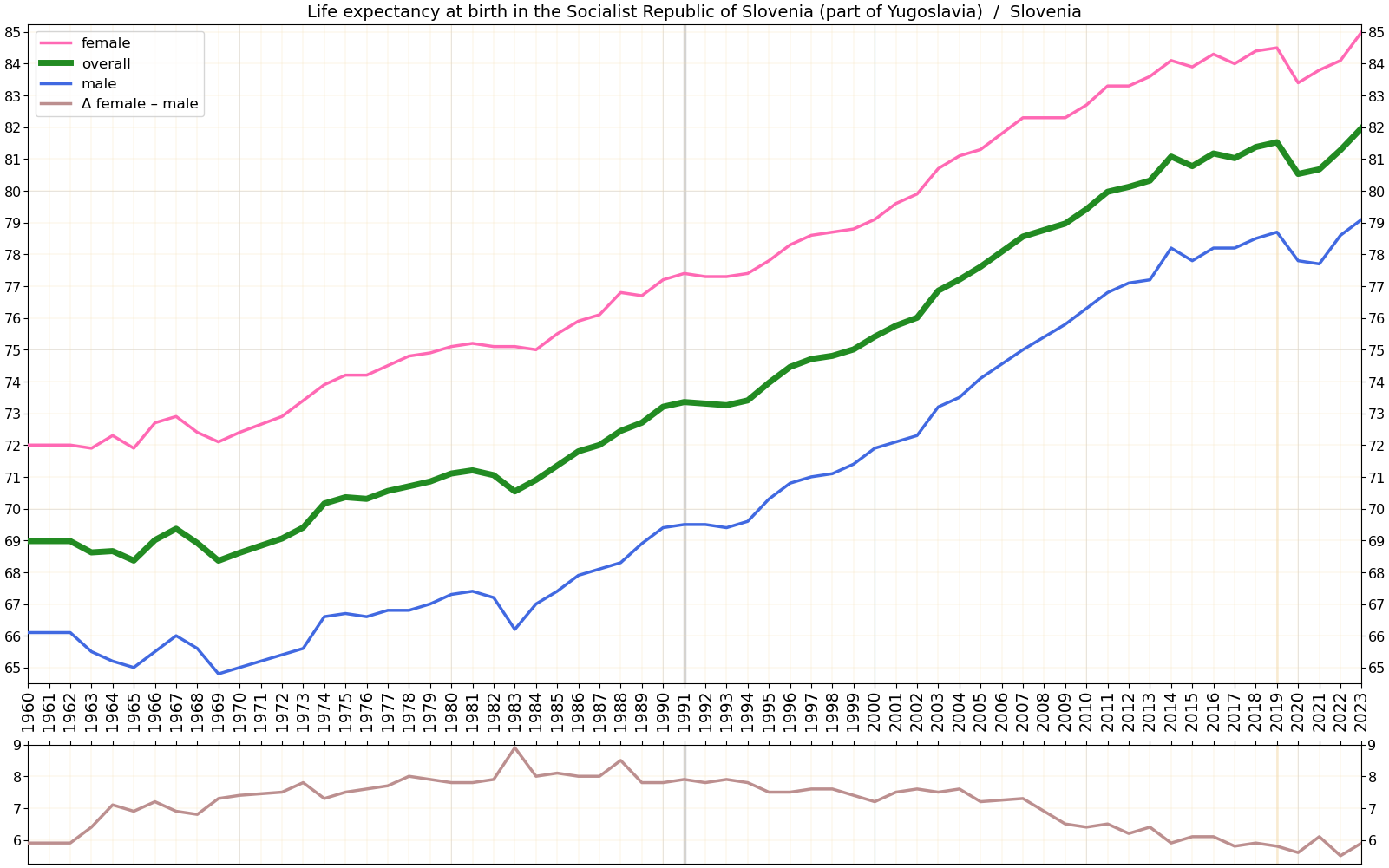
Life expectancy in Slovenia since 1960 by gender

Period	Life expectancy in Years
1950–1955	65.60
1955–1960	▲67.88
1960–1965	▲69.15
1965–1970	▲69.17
1970–1975	▲69.81
1975–1980	▲70.97
1980–1985	▲71.21
1985–1990	▲72.69
1990–1995	▲73.74
1995–2000	▲75.26
2000–2005	▲76.66
2005–2010	▲78.55
2010–2015	▲80.31

== Marriages and divorces ==
	Mid-year population	Marriages	Divorces	Crude marriage rate (per 1000)	Crude divorce rate (per 1000)	Divorces per 1000 marriages
1950	1,466,881	14,817	924	10.1	0.6	62.4
1951	1,480,245	13,332	845	9.0	0.6	63.4
1952	1,493,550	12,873	835	8.6	0.6	64.9
1953	1,508,428	13,368	973	8.9	0.6	72.8
1954	1,521,485	14,126	747	9.3	0.5	52.9
1955	1,533,998	14,105	1,155	9.2	0.8	81.9
1956	1,545,591	13,740	1,367	8.9	0.9	99.5
1957	1,556,521	13,124	1,393	8.4	0.9	106.1
1958	1,566,979	12,998	1,403	8.3	0.9	107.9
1959	1,576,204	13,618	1,454	8.6	0.9	106.8
1960	1,580,145	14,013	1,540	8.9	1.0	109.9
1961	1,595,450	14,442	1,562	9.1	1.0	108.2
1962	1,604,980	14,535	1,532	9.1	1.0	105.4
1963	1,614,414	14,277	1,550	8.8	1.0	108.6
1964	1,630,553	14,622	1,671	9.0	1.0	114.3
1965	1,650,413	15,121	1,841	9.2	1.1	121.8
1966	1,669,606	14,348	1,853	8.6	1.1	129.1
1967	1,690,939	13,984	1,973	8.3	1.2	141.1
1968	1,703,708	14,010	2,023	8.2	1.2	144.4
1969	1,714,022	14,113	2,008	8.2	1.2	142.3
1970	1,726,513	14,281	1,913	8.3	1.1	134.0
1971	1,738,101	14,186	1,957	8.2	1.1	138.0
1972	1,751,506	15,792	1,840	9.0	1.1	116.5
1973	1,766,125	15,681	2,093	8.9	1.2	133.5
1974	1,782,470	15,408	2,102	8.6	1.2	136.4
1975	1,800,022	15,379	2,205	8.5	1.2	143.4
1976	1,819,276	15,048	2,198	8.3	1.2	146.1
1977	1,839,358	15,026	2,406	8.2	1.3	160.1
1978	1,862,620	14,695	2,515	7.9	1.4	171.1
1979	1,882,304	14,230	2,220	7.6	1.2	156.0
1980	1,901,208	12,377	2,309	6.5	1.2	186.6
1981	1,917,469	12,153	2,443	6.3	1.3	201.0
1982	1,924,877	11,689	2,537	6.1	1.3	217.0
1983	1,933,104	11,878	2,710	6.1	1.4	228.2
1984	1,942,802	11,386	2,538	5.9	1.3	222.9
1985	1,973,151	10,579	2,547	5.4	1.3	240.8
1986	1,980,718	10,621	2,281	5.4	1.2	214.8
1987	1,989,462	10,307	2,163	5.2	1.1	209.9
1988	1,999,988	9,217	2,075	4.6	1.0	225.1
1989	1,999,404	9,776	2,161	4.9	1.1	221.1
1990	1,998,090	8,517	1,858	4.3	0.9	218.2
1991	2,001,768	8,173	1,828	4.1	0.9	223.7
1992	1,995,832	9,119	1,966	4.6	1.0	215.6
1993	1,990,623	9,022	1,962	4.5	1.0	217.5
1994	1,988,850	8,314	1,923	4.2	1.0	231.3
1995	1,987,505	8,245	1,585	4.1	0.8	192.2
1996	1,991,169	7,555	2,004	3.8	1.0	265.3
1997	1,986,848	7,500	1,996	3.8	1.0	266.1
1998	1,982,603	7,528	2,074	3.8	1.0	275.5
1999	1,985,557	7,716	2,074	3.9	1.0	268.8
2000	1,990,272	7,201	2,125	3.6	1.1	295.1
2001	1,992,035	6,935	2,274	3.5	1.1	327.9
2002	1,995,718	7,064	2,457	3.5	1.2	347.8
2003	1,996,773	6,756	2,461	3.4	1.2	364.3
2004	1,997,004	6,558	2,411	3.3	1.2	367.6
2005	2,001,114	5,769	2,647	2.9	1.3	458.8
2006	2,008,516	6,368	2,334	3.2	1.2	366.5
2007	2,019,406	6,373	2,617	3.2	1.3	410.6
2008	2,022,629	6,703	2,246	3.3	1.1	335.1
2009	2,042,335	6,542	2,297	3.2	1.1	351.1
2010	2,049,261	6,528	2,430	3.2	1.2	372.2
2011	2,052,496	6,671	2,298	3.3	1.1	344.5
2012	2,056,262	7,057	2,509	3.4	1.2	355.5
2013	2,059,114	6,254	2,351	3.0	1.1	375.9
2014	2,061,623	6,571	2,469	3.2	1.2	375.7
2015	2,063,077	6,449	2,432	3.1	1.2	377.1
2016	2,064,241	6,667	2,531	3.2	1.2	379.6
2017	2,066,161	6,481	2,387	3.1	1.2	368.3
2018	2,070,050	7,256	2,347	3.5	1.1	323.5
2019	2,089,310	6,672	2,476	3.2	1.2	371.1
2020	2,100,126	5,214	1,774	2.5	0.8	340.2
2021	2,107,007	5,916	2,322	2.8	1.1	392.5
2022	2,108,732	6,768	2,149	3.2	1.0	317.5
2023	2,120,937	6,388	2,165	3.0	1.0	338.9
2024	2,126,324	6,353	2,064	3.0	1.0	324.9

== Immigration ==
Largest groups of foreign residents
Rank	Nationality	Population (2025)
1	Bosnia and Herzegovina	97,752
2	Kosovo	29,905
3	Serbia	20,144
4	North Macedonia	16,997
5	Ukraine	10,149
6	(European Union) Croatia	10,018
7	Russia	5,906
8	(European Union) Bulgaria	3,225
9	(European Union) Italy	2,446
10	China	1,529
11	Montenegro	1,147
12	(European Union) Germany	1,142
13	India	1,039
14	Turkey	1,035
15	(European Union) Hungary	765
16	United Kingdom	725
17	United States	574
18	(European Union) Romania	530
19	(European Union) Austria	521
20	(European Union) Slovakia	483

=== Net Migration ===
Slovenia International Migration Statistics (1961–present)
Year	Immigrants from Abroad	Emigrants to Abroad	Net Migration from Abroad
1961	6,537	5,707	830
1962	7,373	5,357	2,016
1963	8,850	6,056	2,794
1964	9,364	5,999	3,365
1965	10,513	6,250	4,263
1966	9,457	5,046	4,411
1967	9,272	5,686	3,586
1968	7,051	6,112	939
1969	7,834	6,705	1,129
1970	7,168	5,665	1,503
1971	7,442	4,913	2,529
1972	7,832	4,475	3,357
1973	8,271	4,956	3,315
1974	9,646	5,281	4,365
1975	11,325	4,479	6,846
1976	12,682	4,570	8,112
1977	13,132	5,113	8,019
1978	12,770	5,432	7,338
1979	13,877	5,780	8,097
1980	11,983	6,710	5,273
1981	11,482	7,220	4,262
1982	10,644	6,207	4,437
1983	9,781	5,977	3,804
1984	9,224	5,910	3,314
1985	8,912	5,386	3,526
1986	9,194	5,294	3,900
1987	8,580	4,124	4,456
1988	7,782	4,089	3,693
1989	7,151	4,730	2,421
1990	7,075	4,908	2,167
1991	5,989	9,060	−3,071
1992	3,461	3,848	−387
1993	2,745	1,390	1,355
1994	1,919	983	936
1995	5,879	3,372	2,507
1996	9,495	2,985	6,510
1997	7,889	5,447	2,442
1998	4,603	6,708	−2,105
1999	4,941	2,606	2,335
2000	6,185	3,570	2,615
2001	7,803	4,811	2,992
2002	9,134	7,269	1,865
2003	9,279	5,867	3,412
2004	10,171	8,269	1,902
2005	15,041	8,605	6,436
2006	20,016	13,749	6,267
2007	29,193	14,943	14,250
2008	30,693	12,109	18,584
2009	30,296	18,788	11,508
2010	15,416	15,937	−521
2011	14,083	12,024	2,059
2012	15,022	14,378	644
2013	13,871	13,384	487
2014	13,846	14,336	−490
2015	15,420	14,913	507
2016	16,623	15,572	1,051
2017	18,808	17,555	1,253
2018	28,455	13,527	14,928
2019	31,319	15,106	16,213
2020	36,110	17,745	18,365
2021	23,624	21,144	2,480
2022	35,613	20,956	14,657
2023	33,939	22,411	11,528
2024	33,023	21,491	11,532
2025	30,854	22,335	8,519

== Ethnic groups ==
The majority of Slovenia's population are ethnic Slovenes (83.06%). Hungarians and Istrian Italians have the status of indigenous minorities under the Constitution of Slovenia, which guarantees them seats in the National Assembly. Most other minority groups, particularly those from other parts of the former Yugoslavia (except for one part of autochthonous community of Serbs and Croats), relocated after World War II for economic reasons. The Istrian–Dalmatian exodus (Italian: esodo giuliano dalmata; Slovene: istrsko-dalmatinski eksodus; Croatian: istarsko-dalmatinski egzodus) was the post-World War II exodus and departure of local ethnic Italians (Istrian Italians and Dalmatian Italians) as well as ethnic Croats from Yugoslavia. The inhabitants, who had lived in the now Yugoslav territories of the Julian March (Karst Region and Istria), Kvarner and Dalmatia, largely went to Italy, but some joined the Italian diaspora in the Americas, Australia and South Africa. According to the census organized in Croatia in 2001 and that organized in Slovenia in 2002, the Italians who remained in the former Yugoslavia amounted to 21,894 people (2,258 in Slovenia and 19,636 in Croatia).

Around 12.4% of the inhabitants of Slovenia were born abroad. According to data from 2008, there were around 100,000 non-EU citizens living in Slovenia, or around 5% of the overall population of the country. The highest number came from Bosnia and Herzegovina, followed by immigrants from Serbia, North Macedonia, Croatia (which has since joined the EU itself) and Kosovo. In April 2019, there were 143,192 foreign citizens living in Slovenia, representing 6.87% of Slovenia's population. The number of people migrating to Slovenia has been steadily rising from 1995; and the rate of immigration itself has been increasing year-on-year, reaching its peak in 2016. Since Slovenia joined the EU in 2004, the yearly inflow of immigrants has doubled by 2006 and tripled by 2009. In 2007, Slovenia was one of the countries with the fastest growth of net migration rate in the European Union.

Population of Slovenia by ethnic group, 1948–2002^{1}
Ethnic group	1948 census		1953 census		1961 census		1971 census		1981 census		1991 census		2002 census	
Ethnic group	Number	%	Number	%	Number	%	Number	%	Number	%	Number	%	Number	%
Slovenes	1,350,149	97.0	1,415,448	96.5	1,522,248	95.6	1,578,963	94.0	1,668,623	90.8	1,689,657	88.3	1,631,363	83.1
Serbs	7,048	0.5	11,225	0.8	13,609	0.9	20,209	1.2	41,695	2.3	47,401	2.5	38,964	2.0
Croats	16,069	1.2	17,978	1.2	31,429	2.0	41,556	2.5	53,882	2.9	52,876	2.8	35,642	1.8
Ethnic Muslims	179	0.0	1,617	0.1	465	0.0	3,197	0.2	13,339	0.7	26,577	1.4	10,467	0.5
Bosniaks	179	0.0	1,617	0.1	465	0.0	3,197	0.2	13,339	0.7	26,577	1.4	21,542	1.1
Hungarians	10,579	0.8	11,019	0.8	10,498	0.7	8,943	0.5	8,777	0.5	8,000	0.4	6,243	0.3
Albanians	216	0.0	169	0.0	282	0.0	1,266	0.1	1,933	0.1	3,534	0.2	6,186	0.3
Macedonians	366	0.0	640	0.0	1,009	0.1	1,572	0.1	3,227	0.2	4,371	0.2	3,972	0.2
Romani	46	0.0	1,663	0.1	158	0.0	951	0.1	1,393	0.1	2,259	0.1	3,246	0.2
Montenegrins	521	0.0	1,356	0.1	1,384	0.1	1,950	0.1	3,175	0.2	4,339	0.2	2,667	0.1
Italians	1,458	0.1	854	0.1	3,072	0.2	2,987	0.2	2,138	0.1	2,959	0.2	2,258	0.1
Others/undeclared	5,242	0.4	4,456	0.3	7,369	0.5	19,212	1.1	40,199	2.2	79,374	4.1	201,486	10.3
Total	1,391,873		1,466,425		1,591,523		1,679,051		1,838,381		1,913,355		1,964,036	
^{1} Source:.

== Religion ==
Traditionally, Slovenes are predominantly Roman Catholic. Before World War II, 97% of Slovenes declared as Roman Catholics, around 2.5% were Lutheran, and only around 0.5% belonged to other denominations. Catholicism was an important feature of both social and political life in pre-communist Slovenia. After 1945, the country underwent a process of gradual but steady secularization. After a decade of severe persecution of religions, the communist regime adopted a policy of relative tolerance towards the churches, but limited their social functioning. After 1990, the Roman Catholic Church regained some of its former influence, but Slovenia remains a largely secularized society. According to the 2002 census, 57.8% of the population is Roman Catholic. As elsewhere in Europe, affiliation with Roman Catholicism is dropping: in 1991, 71.6% were self-declared Catholics, which means a drop of more than 1% annually. The vast majority of Slovenian Catholics belong to the Latin Church. A small number of Eastern Catholics live in the White Carniola region.

Despite a relatively small number of Protestants (less than 1% in 2002), the Protestant legacy is important because of its historical significance, since the bases of Slovene standard language and Slovene literature were established by the Protestant Reformation in the 16th century. Nowadays, a significant Lutheran minority lives in the easternmost region of Prekmurje, where they represent around a fifth of the population and are headed by a bishop with the seat in Murska Sobota.

Besides these two Christian denominations, a small Jewish community has also been historically present. After the losses during the Holocaust in Slovenia, Judaism has a few hundred adherents, mostly living in Ljubljana, site of the sole remaining active synagogue in the country.

According to the 2002 census, Islam is the second largest religious denomination with around 2.4% of the population. Most Slovenian Muslims came from Bosnia and Herzegovina, Kosovo, and North Macedonia. The third largest denomination, with around 2.2% of the population, is Orthodox Christianity, with most adherents belonging to the Serbian Orthodox Church, whereas a minority belong to the Macedonian Orthodox Church and other Orthodox churches.

In the 2002, around 10% of Slovenes declared themselves as atheists, another 10% professed no specific denomination, and around 16% decided not to answer the question about their religious affiliation. According to the Eurobarometer Poll 2005, 37% of Slovenian citizens responded that "they believe there is a god", whereas 46% answered that "they believe there is some sort of spirit or life force" and 16% that "they do not believe there is any sort of spirit, god, or life force".

The distribution of the residents of Slovenia by religion is the following: Roman Catholic 57.8%, atheist 10.1%, Muslim 2.4%, Orthodox Christian 2.3%, Protestant 0.9%, other and unknown 26.5% (2002).

According to the published data from the 2002 Slovenian census, out of a total of 47,488 Muslims (2.4% of the total population) 2,804 Muslims (5.90% of the total Muslims in Slovenia) declared themselves as ethnic Slovenian Muslims.

== Language ==
The official language in Slovenia is Slovene, which is a member of the South Slavic language group. In 2002, Slovene was the native language of around 88% of Slovenia's population according to the census, with more than 92% of the Slovenian population speaking it in their home environment. This places Slovenia among the most homogeneous countries in the EU in terms of the share of speakers of predominant mother tongue. Slovene is sometimes characterized as the most diverse Slavic language in terms of dialects, with different degrees of mutual intelligibility. Accounts of the number of dialects range from as few as seven dialects, often considered dialect groups or dialect bases that are further subdivided into as many as 50 dialects. Other sources characterize the number of dialects as nine or eight.

The distribution of speakers by language is the following: Slovene 87.7%, Serbo-Croatian 8%, Hungarian 0.4%, Albanian 0.4%, Macedonian 0.2%, Romani 0.2%, Italian 0.2%, German 0.1%, other 0.1% (Russian, Czech, Ukrainian, English, Slovak, Polish, Romanian, Turkish, French, Bulgarian, Arabic, Spanish, Dutch, "Vlach", Rusyn, Greek, Swedish, Danish or Armenian), unknown 2.7% (2002)

== CIA World Factbook demographic statistics ==
The following demographic statistics are from the CIA World Factbook, unless otherwise indicated.

=== Population ===
2,102,678 (July 2020 est.)

=== Age structure ===
0–14 years: 13.4% (male 138,604/female 130,337)
15–64 years: 69.8% (male 703,374/female 692,640)
65 years and over: 16.8% (male 132,096/female 203,068) (2011 est.)

=== Median age ===
total: 42.8 years
male: 41.1 years
female: 44.5 years (2012 est.)

=== Urbanization ===
urban population: 50% of total population (2012 est.)
rate of urbanization: 0.2% annual rate of change (2010–2015 est.)

=== Sex ratio ===
at birth: 1.07 male(s)/female
under 15 years: 1.06 male(s)/female
15–64 years: 1.01 male(s)/female
65 years and over: 0.66 male(s)/female
total population: 0.95 male(s)/female (2011 est.)

=== Infant mortality rate ===
4.12 deaths/1,000 live births (2010)

=== Life expectancy at birth ===
total population: 80 years
male: 77 years
female: 83 years (2013 est)

== See also ==
- Gottschee
- Bosniaks of Slovenia
- Croats of Slovenia
- Montenegrins of Slovenia
- Serbs of Slovenia
- History of the Jews in Slovenia
- Izbrisani
- Yugoslavia § Demographics
  - Demographics of the Kingdom of Yugoslavia
  - Demographics of the Socialist Federal Republic of Yugoslavia
- Demographics of Austria
- Demographics of Croatia
- Demographics of Hungary
- Demographics of Italy
