= Elez Dervišević =

- Born: 1901; Bijeljina, Condominium of Bosnia and Herzegovina, Austro-Hungarian Empire
- Died: 1988 (aged 86–87) Damascus, Syria
- Allegiance: Austria-Hungary
- Service years: 1914–18
- Rank: Corporal
- Conflicts: Battles of the Isonzo
- Awards: Silver Medal for Bravery 2nd class

Elez Dervišević (1901–1988) was an Austrian-Hungarian soldier and one of the youngest soldiers in the First World War, although he is beaten for the honour of the youngest soldier in the Austro-Hungarian Armed Forces by Ivica Dragićević (most likely born 1908).

== Biography ==
He was born in 1901 to a prominent Bosniak merchant family in Bijeljina, Bosnia and Herzegovina. His parents were Sulejman and Munevera. He had two brothers, Osman and Mehmedalija and one sister, Safija.

== Military career ==
=== Beginnings ===
At the beginning of the First World War, during the mobilisation of the Austro-Hungarian Army, Ademaga Mešić with his own funds, mobilised 450 volunteer troops and stationed them on the Austria-Hungary border on the river Drina. Dervišević's brother, Mehmed, joined the group and was later promoted to captain. At age eleven, Elez left school to defend Austria-Hungary with Mehmed.

=== Battles of the Isonzo ===
When Italy declared war on Austria-Hungary, the 91st Czech Infantry Battalion was ordered to Soča. The teenaged Dervišević volunteered to help the Czech infantry at Soča supplying food for the battalion. The Czech officer stationed there, Alois Martinek, asked the local Protection Corps commander to help guide him via the river Sava and the region of Slavonia, to which he agreed. However, Dervišević abandoned his task to jump on the train with the army to become a soldier. He was discovered only after he got to Soča. After hearing of this, Martinek ordered him off the front line. At first, Dervišević was a courier. Then a commander brought him to see the Bosniak forces in action. From a safe distance he watched as the Third Regiment of the Bosniak attacked and overran the Italian positions. Dervišević and an officer captured three Italian soldiers, and because of this the boy was promoted to corporal. At fourteen he was the youngest soldier in the Austro-Hungarian Army. After nineteen months of service Dervišević was hit by shrapnel in the lower jaw and Martinek sent him to a hospital in Vienna. When he recovered he was stationed in Wielburg castle. He took care of the Ernsthaler family, who enrolled him in cadet school in Bratislava.

== After the war ==
At the end of the First World War, Dervišević returned to Bijeljina. The new Kingdom of Yugoslavia wanted to promote peace and unity, thus any demobilised Bosniak soldier of the Austro-Hungarian army, which had attacked the Kingdom of Serbia without a probable cause, was given clemency, meaning that they were allowed to return to their homes without any hindrance and would be treated as Yugoslav subjects.

Upon arriving, he was greeted by the mother and the brother of Osman Munevera. In 1925 he visited the Ernsthaler family and the Archduchess Isabella who lived in Hungary. He received a gift of 5,000 florins from her.

He used the money to start an agricultural export company. He became a successful entrepreneur in Kingdom of Yugoslavia and his business flourished until the Second World War. After the end of war, he went to Syria, where he was a major in the reserves of the Syrian Army.

He died in Syria in 1988. He was buried in Damascus. He was survived by two daughters and two sons.

== Military decoration ==
For his service in the First World War, Elez Dervišević received the silver medal for Bravery 2nd class, the bronze medal for Bravery and the Medal of Military Merit, all from countries that were defeated in the war.
