= Bosnian-Herzegovinian Infantry =

Austro-Hungarian Army units (1882–1918)

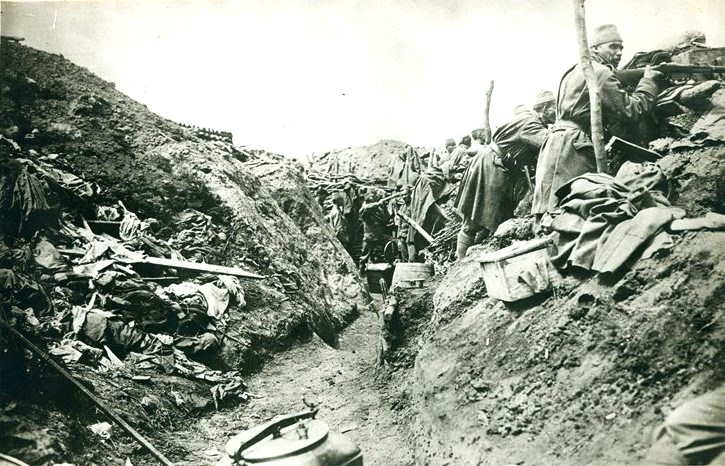
A Bosniak infantry position in Eastern Galicia during World War I.

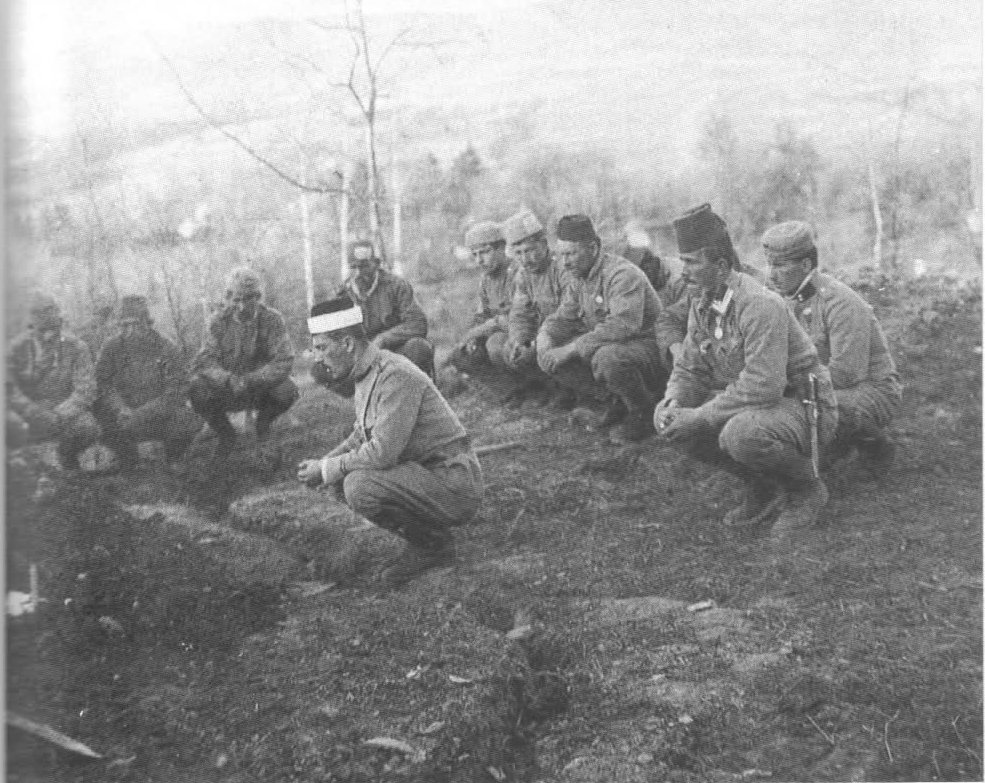
A Bosniak Military Imam in the Austro-Hungarian Army.

The Bosnian-Herzegovinian Infantry (German: Bosnisch-Hercegovinische Infanterie; Serbo-Croatian: Bosanskohercegovačka pješadija / Босанскохерцеговачка пјешадија), commonly called the Bosniaken (German for Bosnians), (Note: Bosniaken was understood by Austrian administration as a name for all inhabitants of Bosnia, not only Bosnian Muslims. In January 1913 39.8% of NCOs and other ranks were Serb Orthodox, 31.4% Muslims and 25.4% Roman Catholic.) were a branch of the Austro-Hungarian Army. Recruited from within the two regions of the Dual-Monarchy which had possessed a significant Muslim population, these regiments enjoyed a special status. They had their own distinctive uniforms and were given their own numbering sequence within the Common Army (KuK).

The units were part of the Austro-Hungarian infantry in 1914 and consisted of four infantry regiments (numbered 1–4) and a Field Rifles Battalion (Feldjägerbataillon). (Note: Unit strengths as of August 1914.)

== Background ==
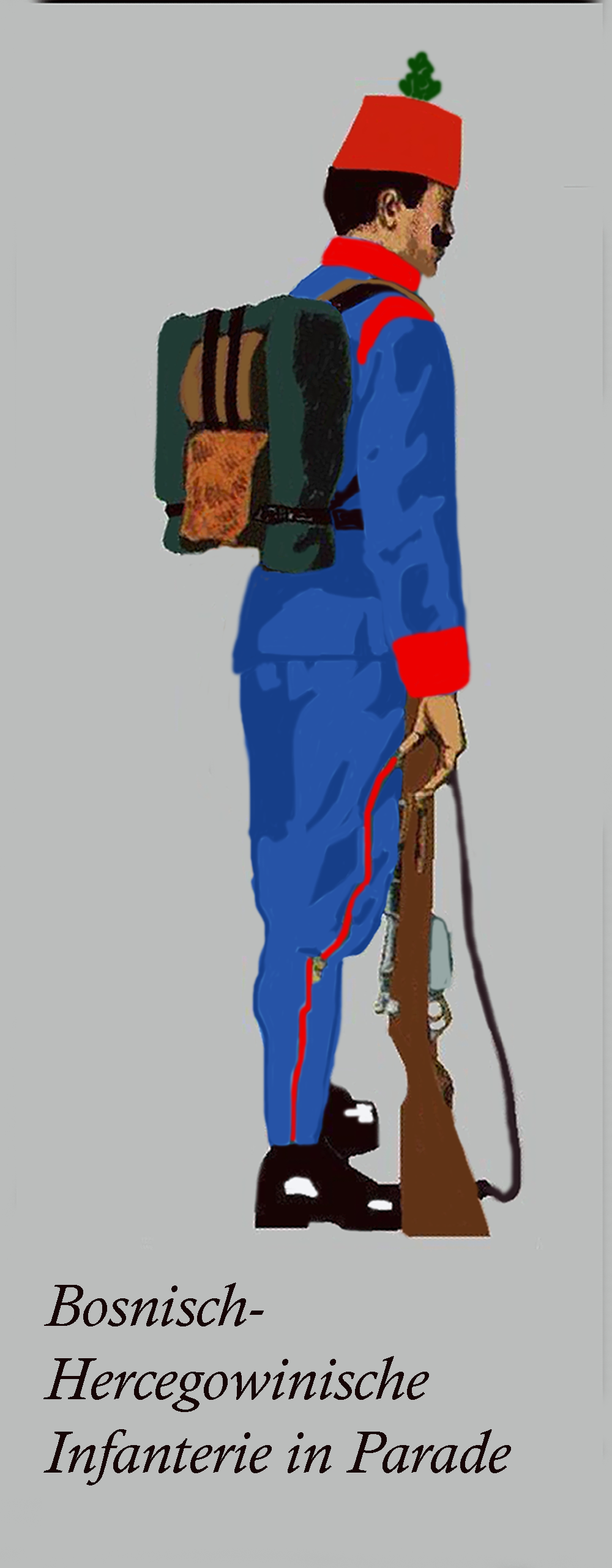
Bosnian-Herzegovinian Infantry parade dress

The Congress of Berlin of 1878 assigned two Ottoman provinces, the Vilayet of Bosnia and the Sanjak of Novi Pazar to administration by Austro-Hungary. In July of the same year Austrian troops began the occupation of the two provinces but encountered widespread resistance from the Muslim population of Bosnia. During a campaign that lasted until October 1878 the Austrian forces suffered casualties of 946 dead and 3,980 wounded.

Although the two provinces constitutionally still belonged to the Ottoman Empire, the Austrian Imperial Administration began to build up a rudimentary administrative apparatus based on a reform of the existing systems. There was ongoing communal tension and resistance to Habsburg rule in many rural areas, especially in Herzegovina and along the eastern border with Montenegro. "The Austrians set up a special local militia force there, the 'Pandurs'; but many of these militia men became rebellious themselves, and some took to brigandage."

"In November 1881 the Austro-Hungarian government passed a Military Law (Wehrgesetz) imposing an obligation upon all Bosnians to serve in the Imperial Army." This led to widespread riots through December 1881 and January 1882 - which were suppressed by military means. The Austrians appealed to the Mufti of Sarajevo, Mustafa Hilmi Hadžiomerović (born 1816) and he soon issued a Fatwa "calling on the muslims to obey military Law." Other important Muslim community leaders such as Mehmed-beg Kapetanović, later Mayor of Sarajevo, also appealed to young Muslim men to serve in the Habsburg military.

== Creation ==
Infantry formations were first set up in 1882 in each of the four main recruiting districts of Sarajevo, Banja Luka, Tuzla, and Mostar. Initially each was composed of one infantry company which was enlarged in subsequent years by a company each. By 1889 there were eight independent battalions. In 1892 three more battalions were established. In 1894 the military administration set up the Bosnian Herzegovinian Infantry Regiment Association (Regimentsverband der Bosnisch-Hercegowinischen Infanterie) in order to integrate them into the rest of the Imperial Austrian army. On 1 January 1894 a "Most High Resolution" (Allerhöchste Entschließung) formalised this measure but it proved to be difficult and was not completed until 1897.

The Field Rifles Battalion (Feldjägerbataillon) was established in 1903.

== Composition ==
Immediately prior to the outbreak of World War I the four Bosnian-Herzegovinian infantry regiments numbered 1 through 4 containing 10,156 men (plus 21,327 reservists) in 12 battalions. The Field Rifles Battalion comprised 434 serving jägers, with 1,208 reservists. In January 1913 31.04% of NCOs and other ranks were Muslims, 39.12% were Serb Orthodox and 25.04% were Roman Catholic. The remainder were a mix of Greek Catholics, Jews and Protestants. Regardless of religious faith all other ranks wore the fez.

== World War I ==
In the course of the war the Bosnian-Herzegovinian infantry regiments (including jägers) expanded to a maximum of 36 battalions. Each had a strength of about 1,200 men when at full strength.

Following the outbreak of the war, Serbs were treated as an unreliable element in the army and ways were sought to disarm them and keep them from combat duty. In November 1914 in Komarom, around 600 Serb soldiers were ordered to wade into the Danube barefoot to extract sand for embankments, leading to many cases of frostbite and hospitalisation. The Serbs of the IV Bosnian-Herzegovinian regiment were disarmed and sent to Vienna to work as labourers. Due to the manpower shortages starting in 1915 after the initial year of the war, those men were recalled to the unit. However, they were dispersed, so that in the trenches and in the barracks, each Orthodox Serb was accompanied by two soldiers of other faiths.

The pressures of heavy casualties led to a breakdown of rigid regional recruitment after 1915, with Hungarian, Polish, Czech and Ukrainian troops serving in Bosnian units, while Bosnians were drafted into the nominally German and Hungarian regiments of the K.u.K. Army. Vladimir Ćorović notes that this was particularly prevalent in the officer corps, even though the Serbian intelligentsia from Bosnia and Herzegovina was not allowed to attend officer schools starting in March 1915. Inevitably this diversity led to a dilution of the effectiveness of individual units but the Bosnian-Herzegovian regiments retained a high reputation for loyalty and effectiveness until the very end of the war. The pressures of heavy casualties also necessitated the recruitment of Serbs held hostage by Austria-Hungary or those imprisoned in its internment camps and prisons. These would be marked with "p.v." ("politically suspicious") and were subjected to a particularly harsh treatment by the officers and other soldiers.

In 1916 Austria-Hungary occupied Albania and about 5,000 Albanian men were recruited "to serve in a militia with Bosnian Muslim officers." This unit, known as the Albanian Legion consisted of Albanian clansman from mostly the regions of Northern Albania and Kosovo.

Captain Gojkomir Glogovac was awarded Austria-Hungary's highest military honour, the Military Order of Maria Theresa, for extreme bravery in 1917; he was subsequently ennobled as Baron Glogovac. Another prominent Bosnian officer to rise in the ranks was Colonel Hussein Biscevic (Husein Biščević or Biščević-beg) who later served in the Waffen SS. Muhamed Hadžiefendić (1898–1943) served as a lieutenant in a Bosnian-Herzegovinian unit during World War I.

== Uniform ==
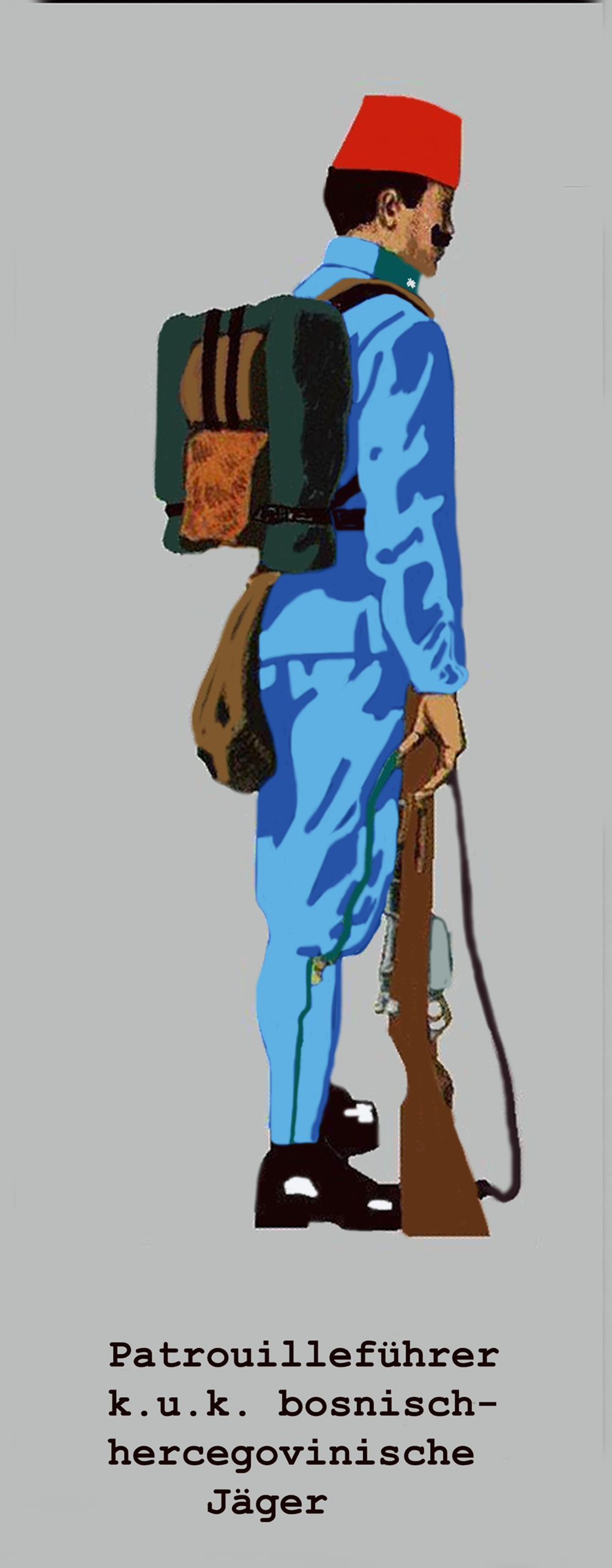
Bosnian-Herzegovinian rifleman (jager)

Bosnian infantry regiments had several uniform features which distinguished them from other units of the Austro-Hungarian army. The most distinctive of these garments was the Oriental fez, which was worn both on parade and in field uniform. The fez was made of reddish-brown felt and equipped with a tassel of black sheep's wool. This tassel was 18.5 cm long and mounted on a rosette fringes. The fez had to be worn so that the tassel was at the back. Officers and cadets usually wore standard Austrian military infantry rigid black caps or full-dress shakos. However, if officers were Muslim, they had the option of wearing the fez.

Except for colour, full dress tunics and normally worn blouses were consistent with those of the standard "German" line infantry of the K.u.K. Army. The buttons were of bronze metal, carrying the appropriate regimental number. Officers' uniforms consisted of light blue tunics, with red collar and yellow buttons, and light blue trousers.

Ordinary soldiers had a light blue uniform with red facings. Included were widely cut oriental-style breeches, which narrowed below the knee (see coloured illustrations above).

The Field Rifles Battalion (Feldjägerbataillon) had a different uniform. The officers and cadets wore the same uniform as the Tyrolean Jägerbataillon, while the ordinary soldiers wore grey uniforms with green facings and the red-brown fez. The žandamerijski corps wore the standard jäger hat with black feathers.

In 1908 "pike-grey" (light blue-grey) uniforms were introduced for field service and ordinary duty wear. The pale blue tunics and breeches were retained for parade and off-duty wear until the outbreak of war in 1914. In 1910 a pike-grey fez was adopted, although the red-brown model was retained for full dress and walking out.

During the early months of World War I the pike-grey uniform proved too conspicuous against the dark forest backgrounds common on the Eastern Front. Greenish tinged "field-grey" uniforms of a similar shade to that of the Imperial German Army were accordingly issued. For reasons of economy the distinctive knee-breeches of the Bosnian regiments were replaced with the universal model of the Austro-Hungarian infantry. In practice, supply shortages led to mixtures of field-grey, pike-grey and even peacetime blue clothing being worn for the remainder of the war. The fez remained in general use.

Soldiers of the Albanian Legion initially wore a lambswool white qeleshe. However, this was later replaced with a field-grey fez donning a red-black-red cockade.

== Weaponry ==
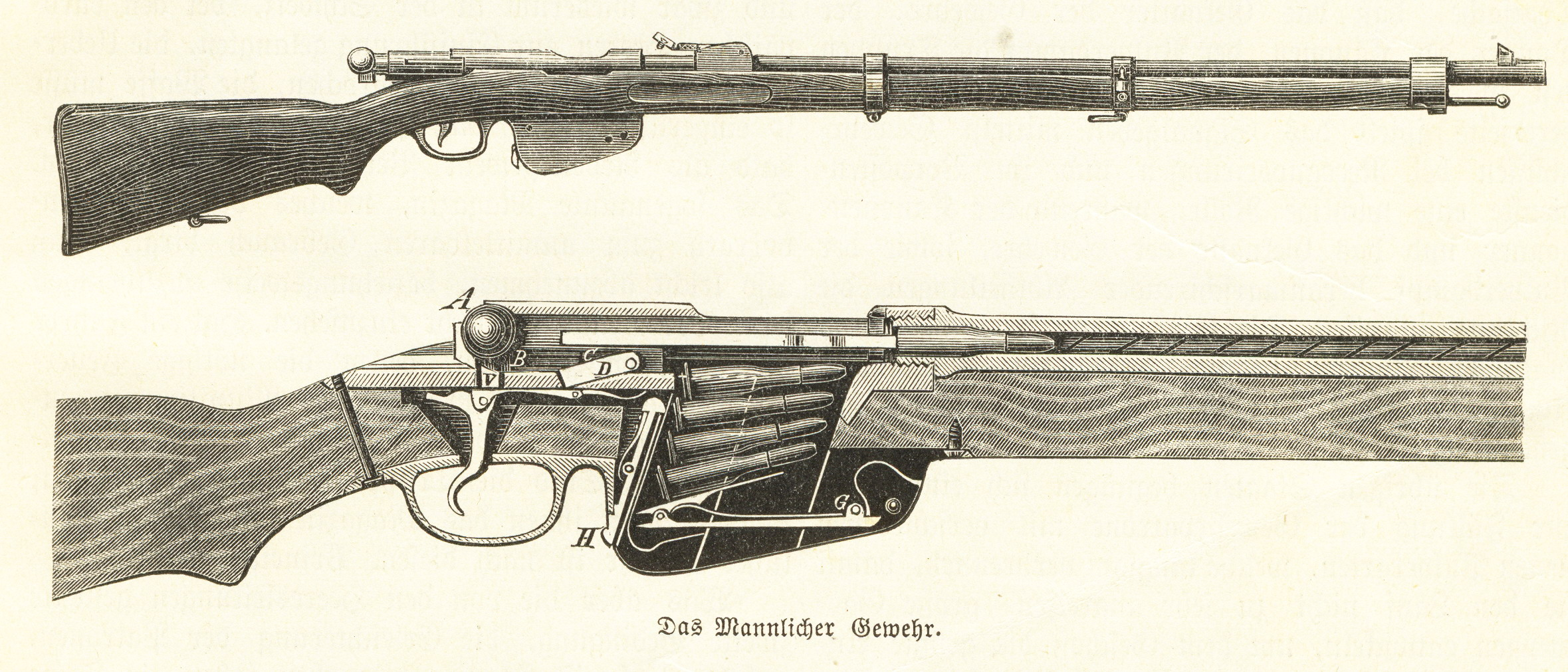
Gewehr Mannlicher M 1890

For most of its existence the Bosnian units were equipped with the Austrian Gewehr Mannlicher M 1890 rifle.

== Commemoration and legacy ==
The collapse of the Austro-Hungarian Empire naturally brought about the disbandment of the k.u.k. army and hence the Bosnian-Herzegovinian troops. These went back to their home country, although several thousand Bosniaks saw their return delayed, having been captured as prisoners of war.

In 1895 Eduard Wagnes wrote the "Die Bosniaken Kommen" march to honour the k.u.k. Bosnian soldiers, the second Infantry Regiment in particular.

Many Bosnian soldiers from the Second Regiment died over 1916 and 1917 in fighting in north Italy during World War I and were subsequently buried in the small village of Lebring-Sankt Margarethen, near Graz, Austria. Since 1917 locals have held a modest memorial service to mark the anniversary of the Battle of Monte Meletti in South Tyrol, only interrupted briefly during the Nazi period. Currently there is a Memorial plaque and a street named "Zweierbosniakengasse" ("2nd Bosniak Street") in Graz. The Italians and the Austrians have also erected a Memorial plaque to the role of the Bosnian soldiers in the biggest Italian military defeat of the war. An impassable ridge defended by Bosnian soldiers four kilometers north of Gorizia is now called the "Passo del Bosniaco" (Pass of the Bosniak). In honour of the Fourth regiment a monument has been erected on the eastern slope of Rombon mountain in Slovenia. Two Bosnian soldiers wearing fez are carved on granite, which takes into account the Rombon. The monument was made by Ladislav Kofranek, a sculptor from Prague.

In 1929 the Army History Museum in Vienna erected a Memorial Plaque to the Bosnian veterans.

Cemetery of the 2nd regiment, Bosnian-Herzegovinian Infantry in Lebring-Sankt Margarethen, Austria
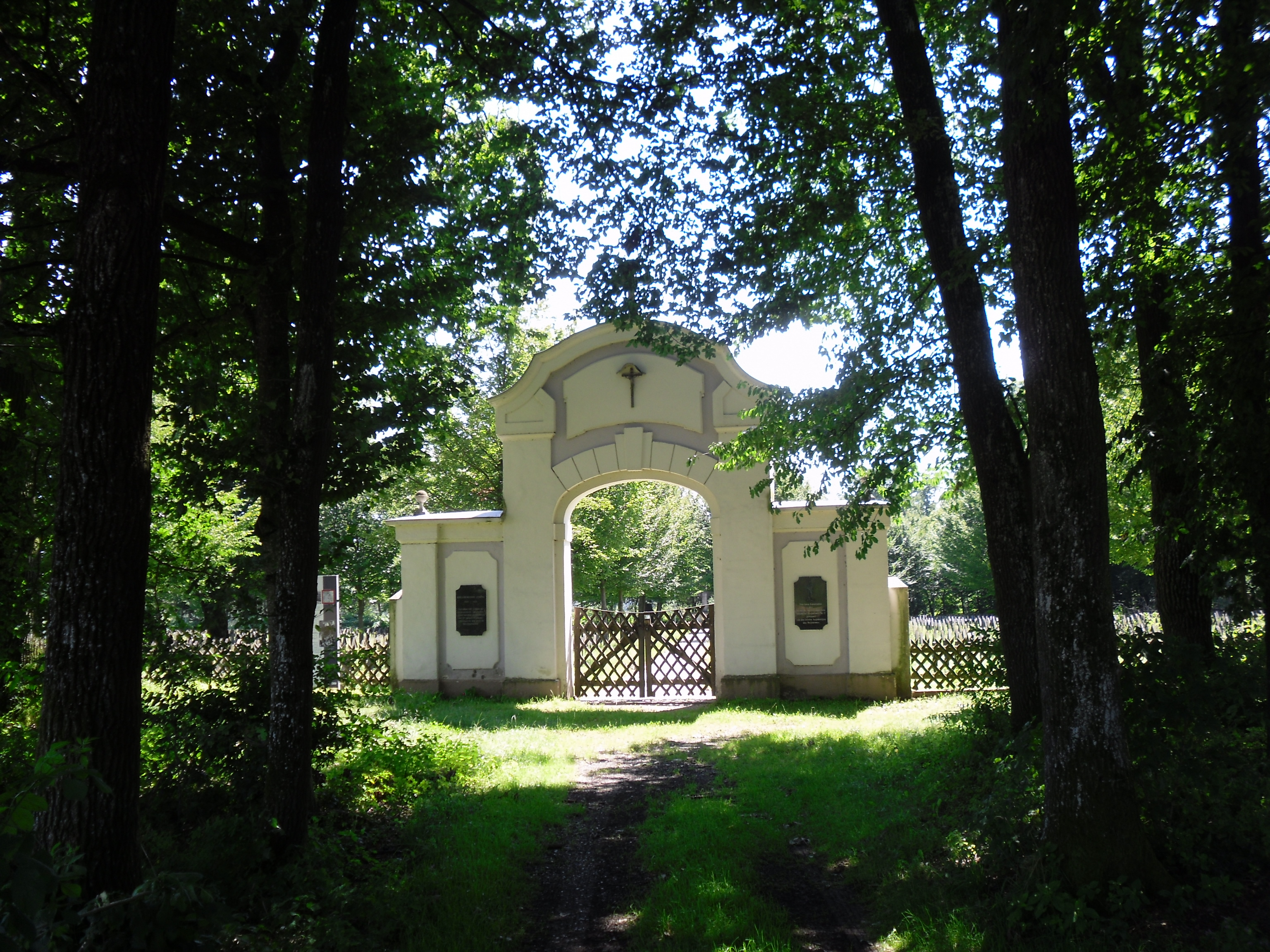
Cemetery entrance

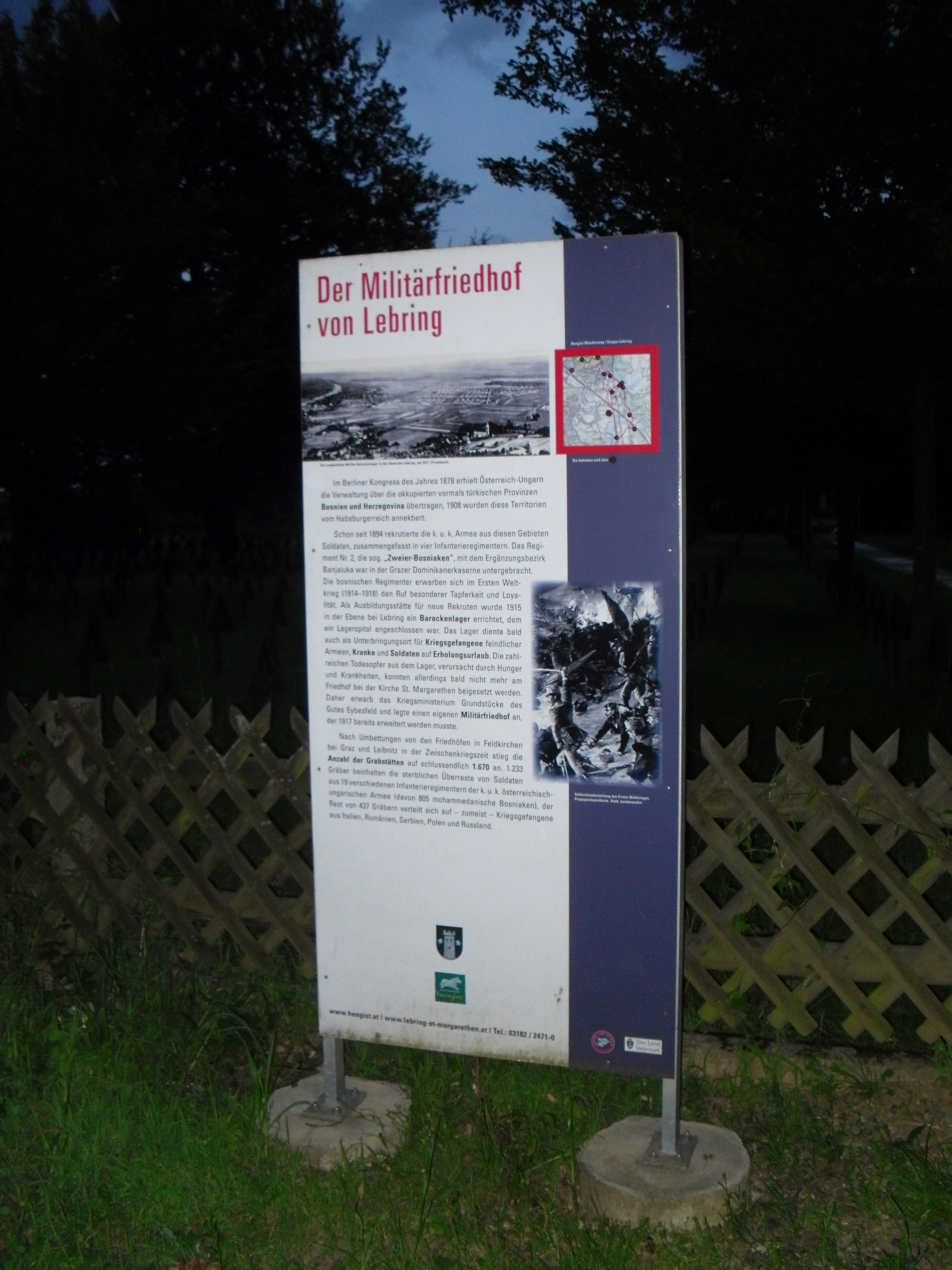
Memorial plaque

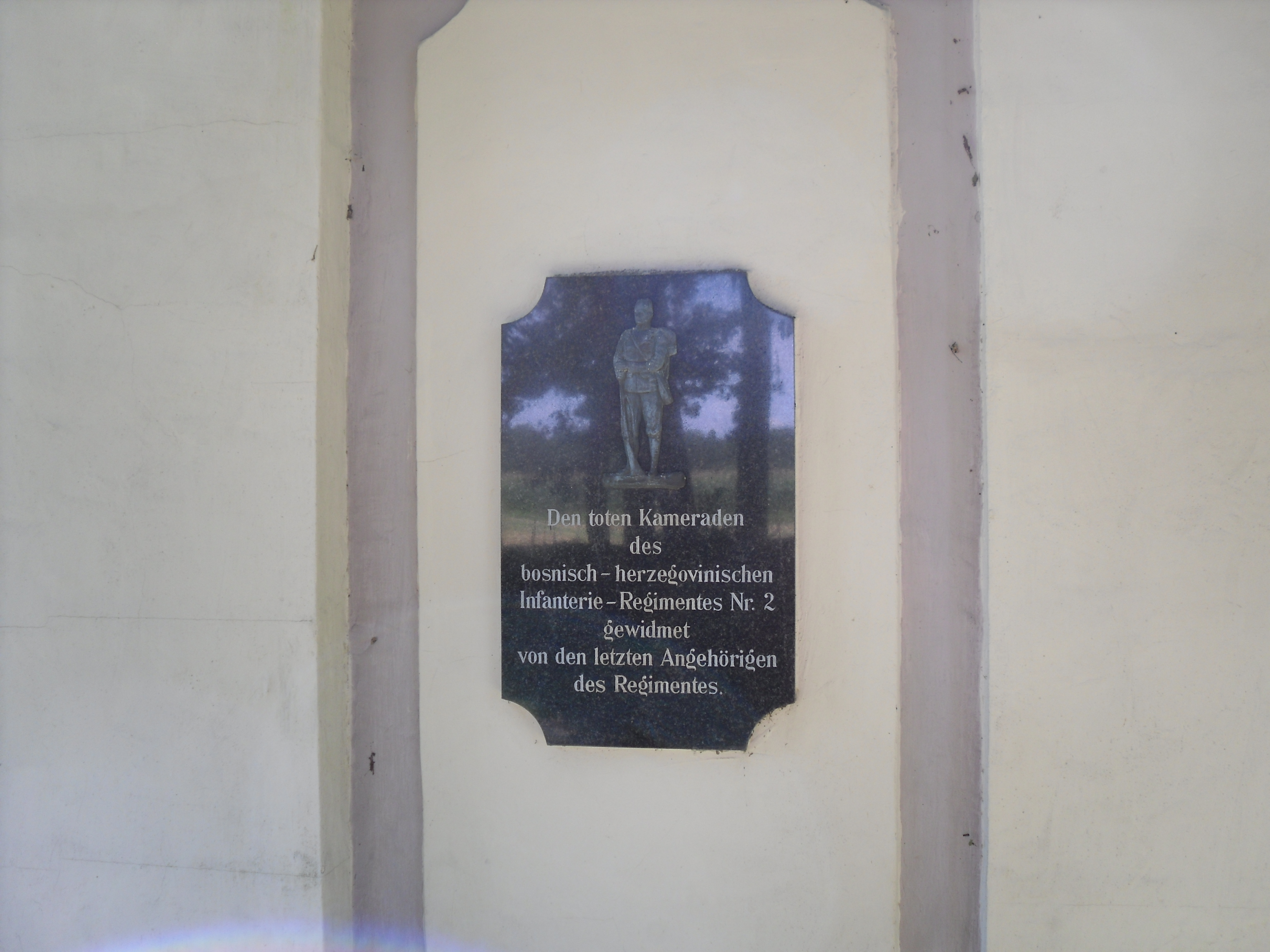
Memorial plaque on the left

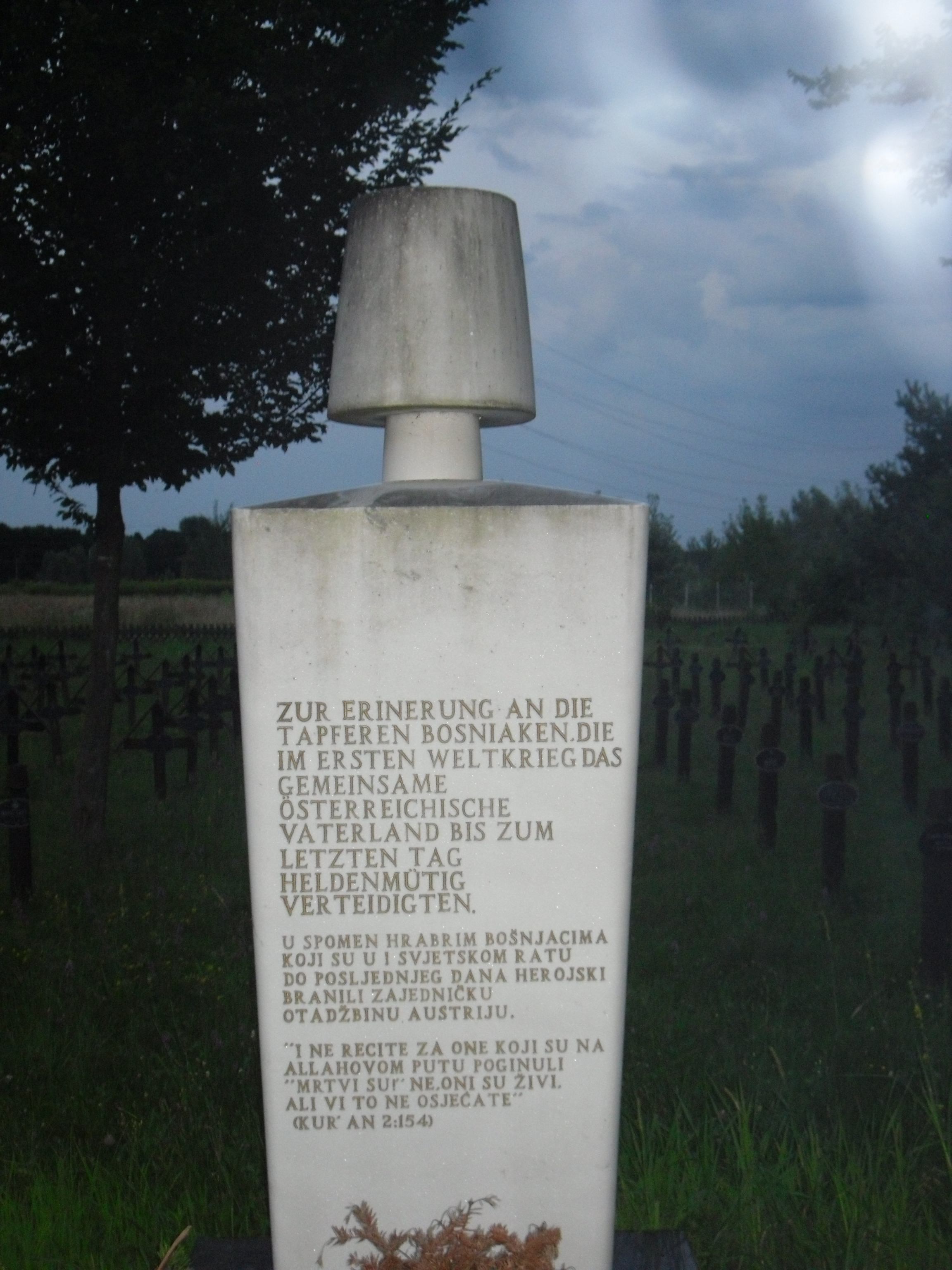
Central tomb

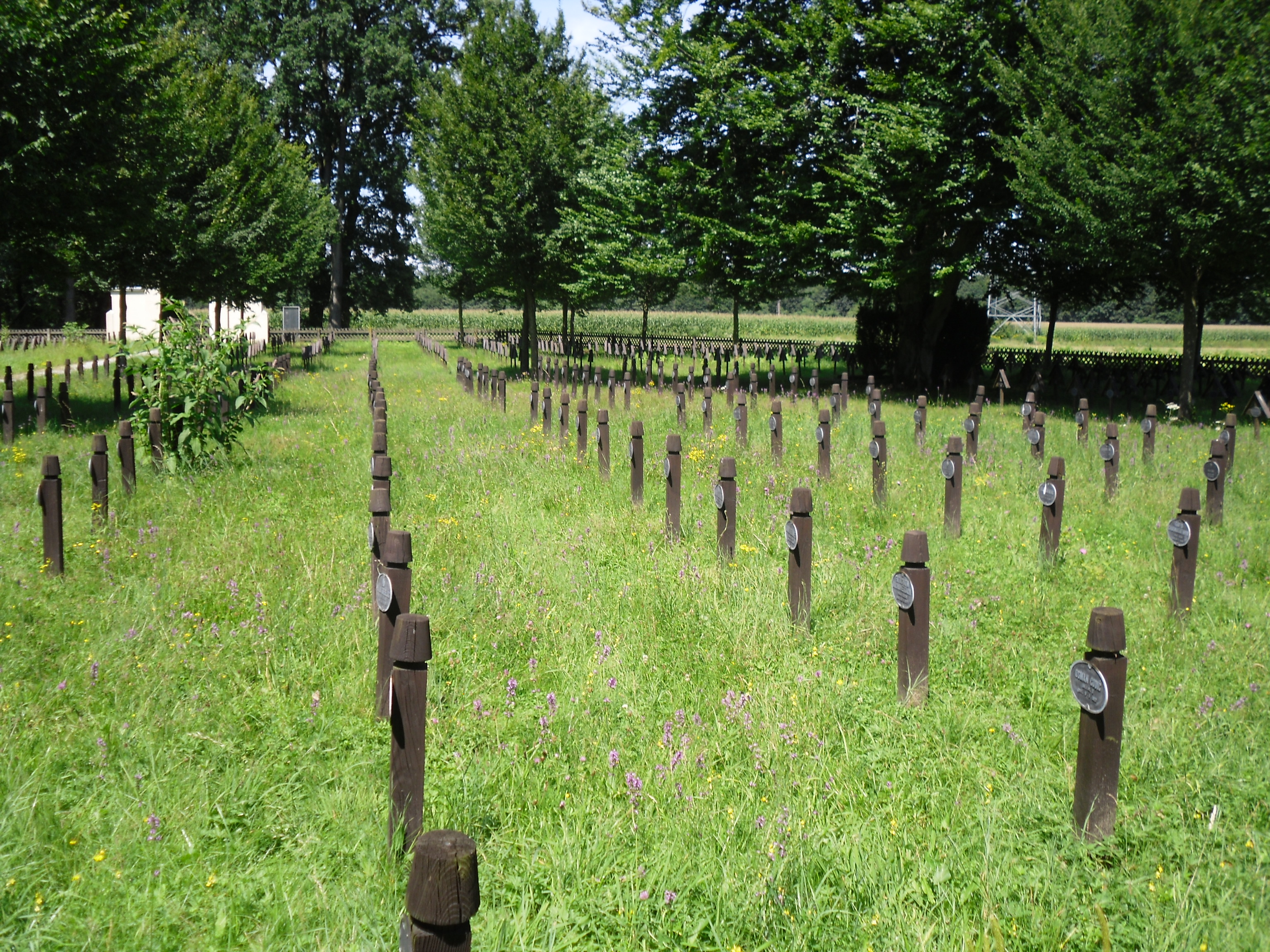
View of cemetery from the south

== Gallery ==
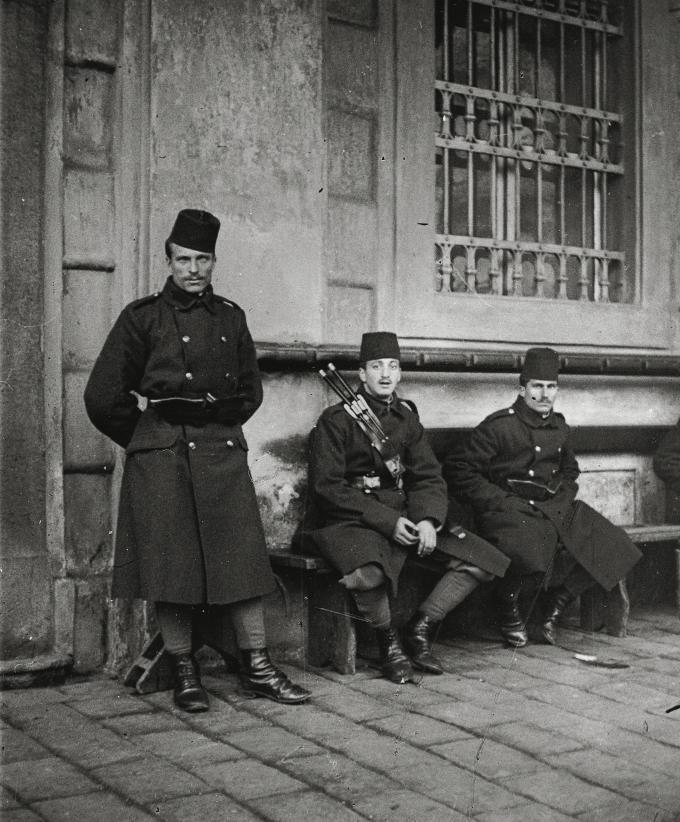

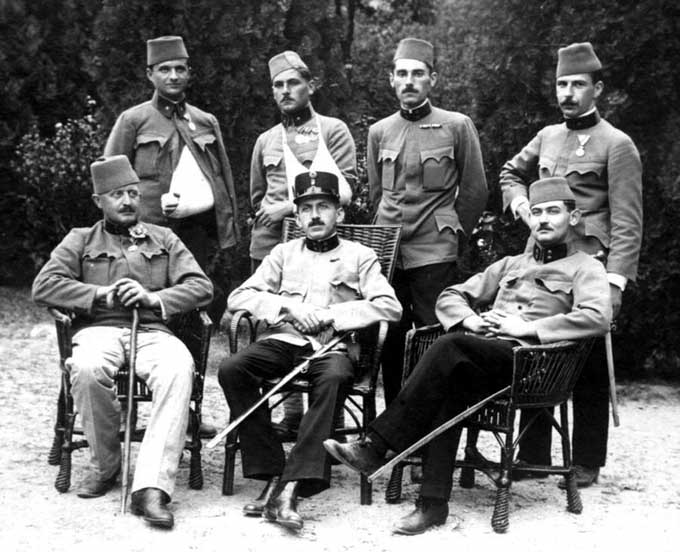

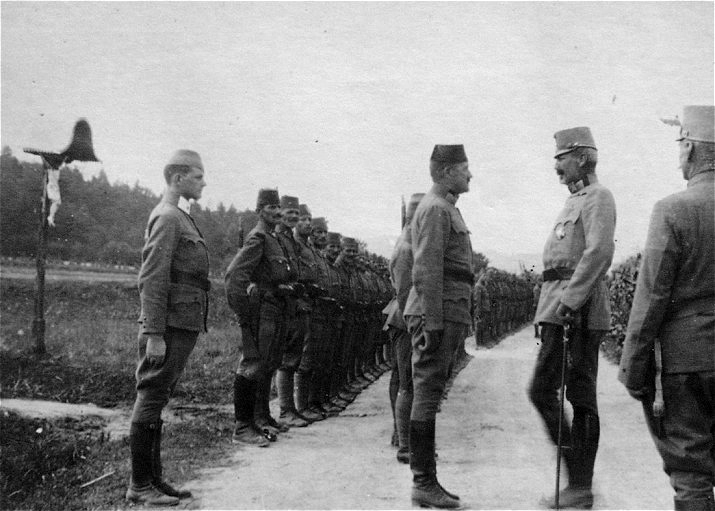

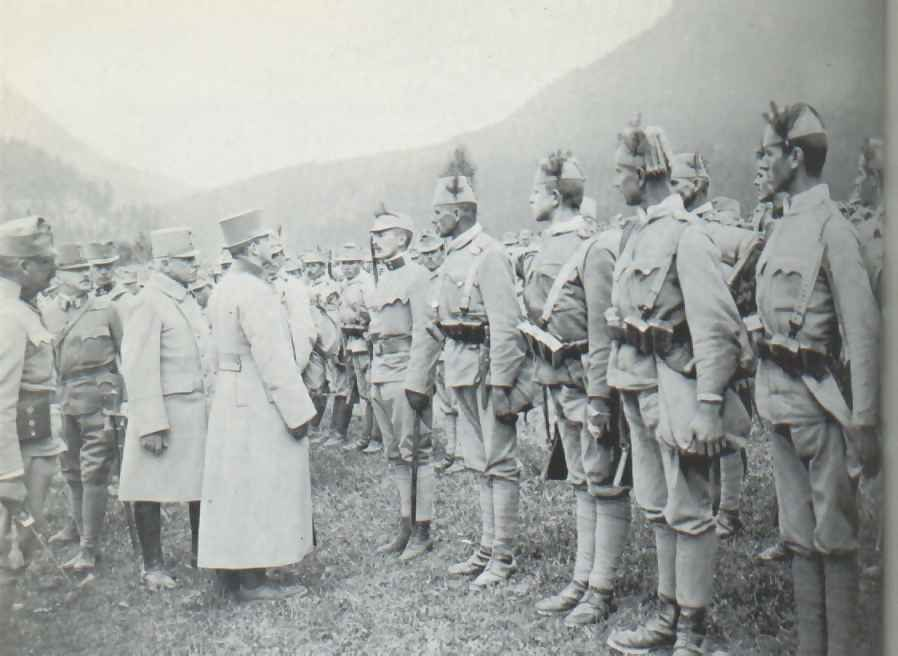

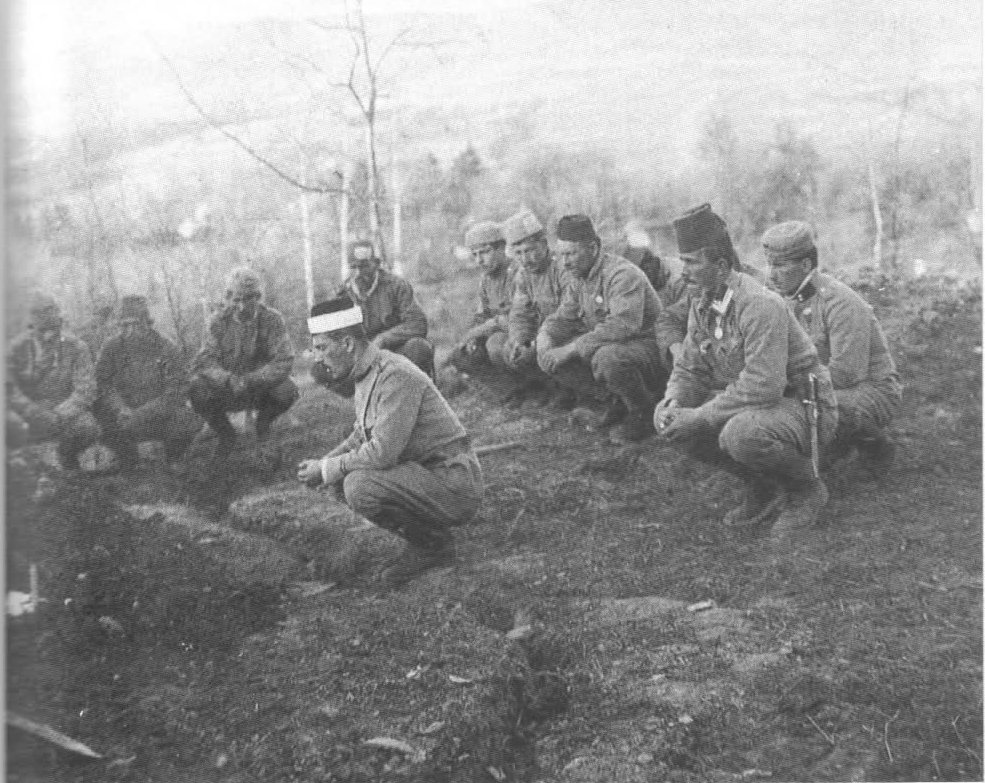

== Sources ==
- Neumayer, Christoph. The Emperor's Bosniaks. ISBN 978-3-902526-17-5.
- Karčić, Fikret (1999). The Bosniaks and the Challenges of Modernity: Late Ottoman and Habsburg Times. ISBN 9789958230219.
