= Ethnic Macedonians in Bulgaria =

Macedonians in Bulgaria Македонци во Бугарија Makedonci vo Bugarija
Total population
- 1,143 (2021 census)

Regions with significant populations
- Blagoevgrad Province and Sofia

Languages
- Bulgarian and Macedonian

Religion
- Bulgarian Orthodox Church

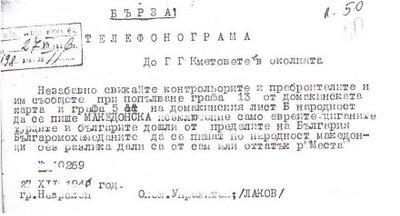
A facsimile of a telegram with instructions from the Nevrokop District Governor during the census of the population in the area in December 1946. The instructions read that the official census takers must record as "Macedonians" all locals.

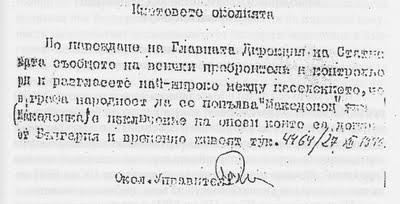
A facsimile of a telegram № 4464 with instructions about the census in Bulgaria in 1946 with order to the scrutineers all people in Pirin Macedonia to be counted as "Macedonians". A second explanatory telegram was issued on the same day, clarifying that if a misunderstanding among the families arises, adults can register their nationality as they wish, while minors must match the head of the family.

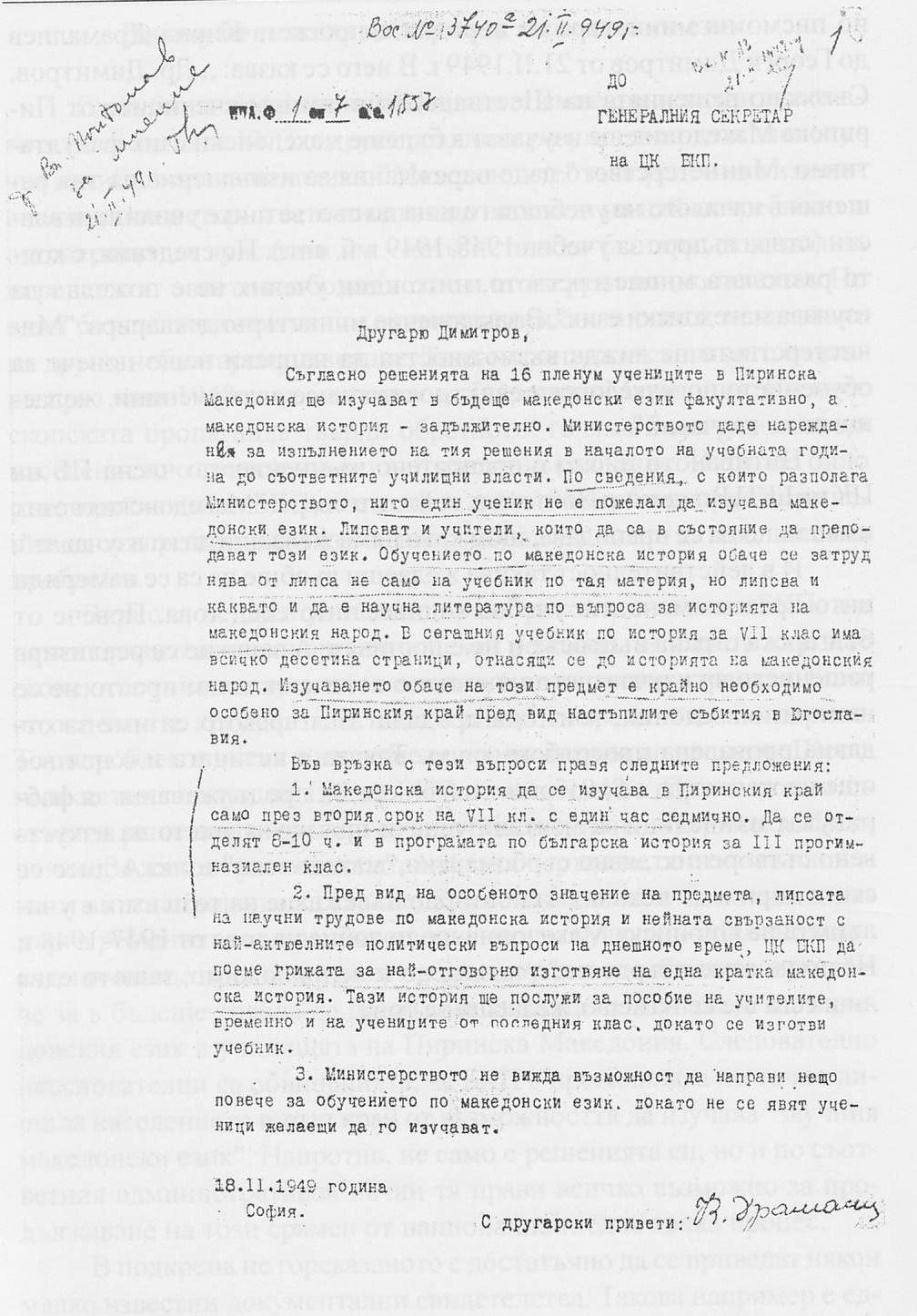
Letter from Bulgarian Education Minister Kiril Dramaliev dated 18 February 1949 informing the General Secretary of the Central Committee of the Bulgarian Communist Party and Prime Minister Georgi Dimitrov that the students from Pirin Macedonia do not want to study the newly codified Macedonian language.

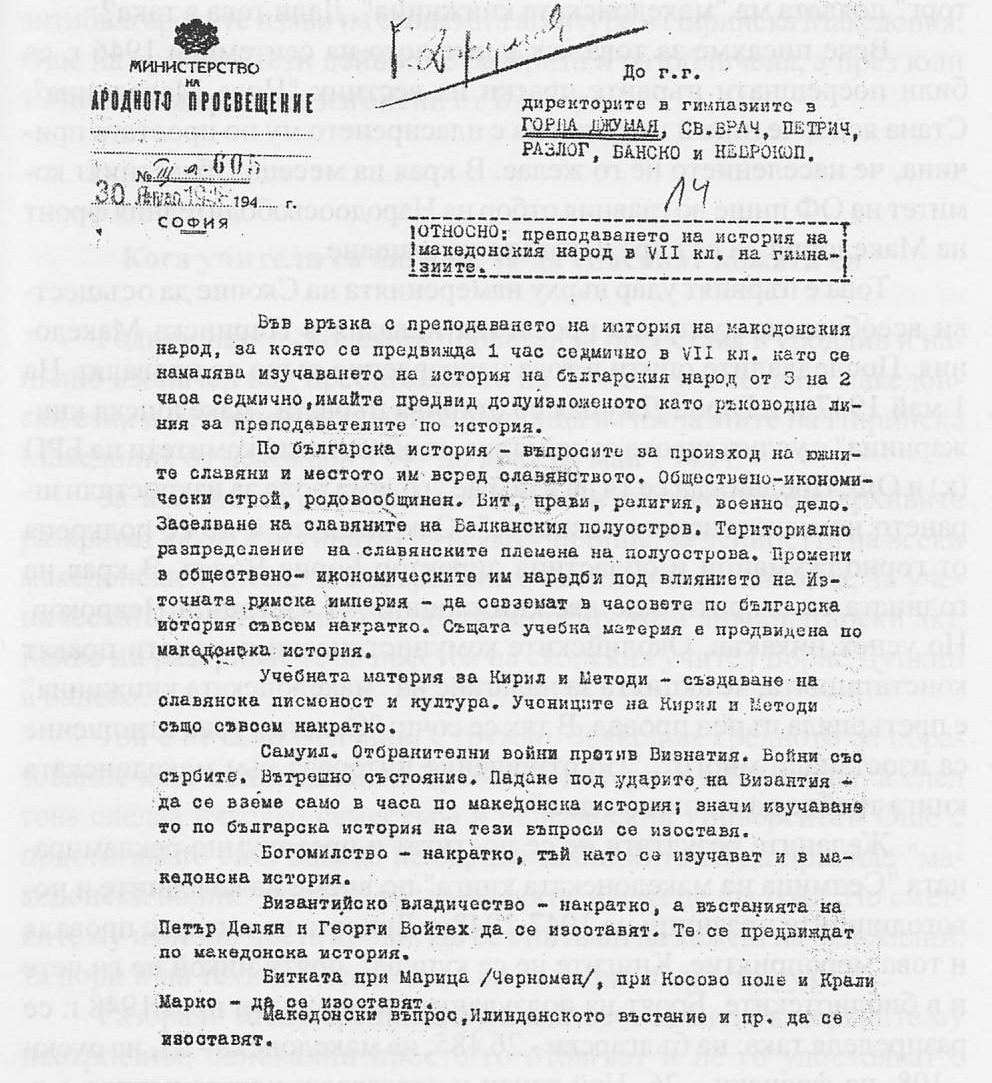
Order of the Ministry of Education of the People's Republic of Bulgaria the pupils to begin study the history of Macedonia separately from the history of Bulgaria, 30 January 1948. Instructions are given as to which sections of school material to drop out to fit the new historical narrative for separate history of Macedonia.

Ethnic Macedonians in Bulgaria (Macedonian: Македонци во Бугарија, romanized: Makedonci vo Bugarija) are one of the ethnic communities in Bulgaria. The issue surrounding this community is highly controversial as Bulgarian authorities traditionally claim that there is no actual ethnic difference between Macedonians and Bulgarians.

At the 1934 census, no Macedonians were recorded in Bulgaria. During World War II, most parts of Yugoslav and Greek Macedonia were annexed by Bulgaria, and the local Slavic-speakers were regarded by the authorities as Bulgarians. After WWII the Macedonian Slavs were recognized as a distinct nationality in Yugoslavia, and between 1946 and 1958 they were recognized in Bulgaria as a separate minority too. During this period there was a surge of Macedonistic policies, the government went as far as to declare the newly codified Macedonian an official language of the Pirin region. The Bulgarian Communist Party was compelled by Joseph Stalin to accept the formation of a distinct Macedonian nation, in order to create with the Yugoslav and Greek communists a United Macedonian state, as part of a scheduled Balkan Communist Federation (see also the 1947 Bled Agreement). In the 1946 census the results indicated their number of almost 170,000. There are clear indications that the vast majority of the population from Blagoevgrad Province then was listed as ethnic Macedonians ex officio by order of the authorities.

However, differences soon emerged with regard to the Macedonian question. Whereas Bulgarians envisaged a state where Yugoslavia and Bulgaria would be placed on an equal footing, the Yugoslavs saw Bulgaria as a seventh republic in an enlarged Yugoslavia. Their differences also extended to the national character of the Macedonians – whereas Bulgaria considered them to be a national offshoot of the Bulgarians, the Yugoslavs regarded them as people who had nothing to do with the Bulgarians. As result, gradual change of that policy came in Bulgaria after the Tito–Stalin split in 1948. After Stalin's death in 1953 Bulgaria started changing the policies towards the ethnic Macedonians. In 1956 census, despite some presence of pressure by the regime to declare as Bulgarians, 187,789 people of Bulgaria declared themselves to be ethnic Macedonians. After 1958 the Bulgarian authorities has openly denied the presence of Macedonian minority in the country, claiming there is no ethnic difference between both communities. At a Plenum of the Central Committee of the BCP in March 1963 Todor Zhivkov finally denounces any notion of “a separate Macedonian nation” in Bulgaria. Zhivkov asserted there was no separate, historically traceable Macedonian nation prior to World War II. He accused historians in the People's Republic of Macedonia of falsifying Bulgarian history and claimed the modern Macedonian national identity was a political project, created on an anti-Bulgarian basis under the influence of Yugoslav Communists. At the 1965 census 9,632 citizens were listed as Macedonian.

According to the Bulgarian Helsinki Committee in 1998, their number ranged from 15,000 to 25,000. In 2006, per the personal evaluation of a leading local ethnic Macedonian activist Stojko Stojkov, they counted already between 5,000 and 10,000 people. The 1992 census indicated 10,830 Macedonians, but in the 2001 census this figure had decreased to 5,071. However, in the 2011 Bulgarian census 1,654 people declared themselves to be ethnic Macedonians, while in the latest 2021 Bulgarian census, only 1,143 citizens declared themselves as ethnic Macedonians.

== Background ==
Until 1913 the majority of the Slavic-speaking population of all three parts of the region of Macedonia identified as Bulgarian. However, clear national consciousness existed among intelligentsia, revolutionaries and clergy on the other hand the peasantry was not involved in national debates, they were meaningless to their concern. Thus, as seen by observers, the affiliation of Macedonian Slavs to different national camps was not indeed belonging to an ethnic group, but rather political and flexible option. In October 1925 the Slavic population in the Bulgarian part of Macedonia repulsed a brief invasion by Greece, fighting alongside the Bulgarian army. In 1922, a referendum was held in Bulgaria to try those responsible for the Second Balkan and First World Wars, which were lost by Bulgaria and which led to the full accession of Macedonia. Macedonians in Bulgaria voted "no" en masse because of the pro-Yugoslav line of the ruling Bulgarian Agrarian National Union (BZNS) and because of the accusation that its leaders assisted the defeat of Bulgaria in the last war due to their leadership military mutiny. The rest of Bulgaria voted mostly 'yes' because (outside several cities) they were strongly opposed to the ruling Agrarianist government and with weaker communist opposition. During World War II, most parts of Yugoslav and Greek Macedonia were annexed by Bulgaria, and the local Slavic-speakers were regarded and self-identified as Macedonian Bulgarians. Not until much later did the process of Macedonian national identity formation gain momentum. After 1944, the People's Republic of Bulgaria and the Socialist Federal Republic of Yugoslavia began a policy of making Macedonia a connecting link for the establishment of new Balkan Federative Republic and stimulating there a development of distinct Slav Macedonian consciousness. The Communist Party of Greece and its fraternal parties in Bulgaria and Yugoslavia had already been influenced by the Resolution of the Comintern on the Macedonian Question, and it was the only political party in Greece to recognize Macedonian national identity. The region of Vardar Macedonia received the status of a constituent republic within Yugoslavia as the Socialist Republic of Macedonia, and in 1945 a separate Macedonian language was codified. The local Slavic population was proclaimed to be ethnically Macedonian – a new nationality meant to be different from the Bulgarians or Serbs.

== History ==
=== Recognition of the minority ===
For a period of some years after the war, the Yugoslav and Bulgarian leaders Josip Broz Tito and Georgi Dimitrov worked on a project to merge their two countries into a Balkan Federative Republic according to the projects of Balkan Communist Federation. At that time, Stalinist regime was gradually imposed in Bulgaria. It covered the period from 1944 to 1956. Mass repressions, political murders, forced collectivization and industrialization began. Tens of thousands were imprisoned without trial in labor camps or interned. As a concession to the Yugoslavian side, Bulgarian authorities agreed to the recognition of a distinct Macedonian ethnicity and language as part of their own population in the Bulgarian part of geographical Macedonia. This was one of the conditions of the Bled agreement, signed between Yugoslavia and Bulgaria on 1 August 1947. In November 1947, pressured by the Yugoslavs, Bulgaria also signed a treaty of friendship with Yugoslavia, and teachers were sent from the Socialist Republic of Macedonia to Blagoevgrad Province to teach the newly codified Macedonian language. The Bulgarian president Georgi Dimitrov was sympathetic to the Macedonian Question. The Bulgarian communist government was compelled once again to adapt its stand to Soviet interests in the Balkans.

At the same time, the organisation of the old Bulgarian nationalist movement the Internal Macedonian Revolutionary Organization (IMRO) was suppressed by the Bulgarian communist authorities. Former IMRO functionaries, local leaders and wealthier citizens were arrested. On the night of October 4–5, 1944, 39 of them were shot and laid in a mass grave in the area above Dobrinishte. Similar mass executions were also carried out in the village of Aydarovo and in the Tserovsko dere area above Gorna Dzhumaya. Apart from this figure, the Nevrokop court issued 27 death sentences and 23 life sentences. Another 11 people were sentenced to various terms of imprisonment. Similar extraordinary courts were also established in the other district centers - G. Dzhumaya, Razlog and Sveti Vrach. The People's Court in the district center issued 40 death sentences, 23 - life sentences and another 25 - to various terms of imprisonment. The largest number of convicts is in Razlog – 89. Of these, 37 people were sentenced to death, 35 to life imprisonment and another 14 received lesser sentences. In Sv. Vrach, 10 life sentences were issued and another 28 – to various terms of imprisonment. This statistics does not exhaust the circle of those repressed in the period immediately after the September 9th Coup. The families of all the convicts were interned in various places in Northern Bulgaria.

In the autumn of 1944, the Bulgarian communist leadership agreed with the YCP and CPM to promote the unification of the Macedonian people, to assist in the awakening of Macedonian national consciousness in the Pirin region, and to recognize its population as Macedonian. This was seen as a first step towards the region's accession to a future United Macedonia within the framework of a Balkan Federation, of which Bulgaria would also become a part. In 1945, the opposition press published alarming reports about the Macedonist intentions of the communist party. Sharply critical of the leadership of the Bulgarian Communist Party were the warnings that it was preparing to denationalize the population in Pirin Macedonia. From the beginning of 1946, a much better organized and directed state propaganda began in Pirin Macedonia, which had a sharply offensive character. It found allies in the circles of the regional organization of the Bulgarian Communist Party, whose functionaries fell entirely under Yugoslav influence. Thus, in the summer of 1946, at a joint Bulgarian-Yugoslav meeting in Moscow, Stalin approved a Yugoslav plan to grant cultural autonomy to Pirin Macedonia, and the Bulgarian communists gave its consent to it. Stalin also demanded that Bulgaria develop a "Macedonian consciousness" much more intensively among the population in the Pirin region, stating that the fact that such a consciousness had not yet developed meant nothing. According to him, there was no Belarusian identity in Belarus when it was declared a Soviet republic, and later a Belarusian nation was successfully formed. As a result of the August Plenum of the Central Committee of the Bulgarian Communist Party in 1946, a decision was made to open schools in which the newly codified Macedonian language would be taught and Macedonian history would be studied according to the new Macedonian historiography. As a result of the decisions of the plenum, Macedonian National Theater in Gorna Dzumaya and the Macedonian Bookstore were opened, and mass events began to be held in direct cooperation with the People's Republic of Macedonia. For this purpose, 93 teachers from the People's Republic of Macedonia arrived in Pirin Macedonia, who prepared the school curriculum in the local schools.

=== Reversal of recognition ===
However, differences soon emerged with regard to the Macedonian question. Whereas Dimitrov envisaged a state where Yugoslavia and Bulgaria would be placed on an equal footing and Macedonia would be more or less attached to Bulgaria, Tito saw Bulgaria as a seventh republic in an enlarged Yugoslavia tightly ruled from Belgrade. Their differences also extended to the national character of the Macedonians – whereas Dimitrov considered them to be an national offshoot of the Bulgarians, Tito regarded them as an independent nation which had nothing to do with the Bulgarians. Thus the initial tolerance for the Macedonization of Bulgarian Macedonia gradually grew into outright alarm. As result gradual change of that policy came in Bulgaria after the Tito–Stalin split in 1948.

After 1948, Bulgarian authorities targeted people who supported teaching the Macedonian language in schools, supported partial Macedonian unification within Yugoslavia, claimed that Macedonians in Bulgaria were not free, or people who showed sympathy toward the People's Republic of Macedonia leading to mass arrests, expulsions, and accusations of "Titoism". Between late 1948 and 1953, hundreds of party members in Pirin Macedonia were imprisoned, and 4,700 expelled from the party and removed from their positions. All individuals who had studied in the People's Republic of Macedonia were ordered to return to Bulgaria, where they were persuaded by the Bulgarian security services. Those who refused were subsequently sent to labor camps and mines. Shortly afterwards, the concentration of military forces along the border intensified in anticipation of an expected war with Yugoslavia, leading to the closure of the border with barbed wire networks and strict surveillance. The diversionary activities between Bulgaria and Yugoslavia claimed numerous lives and resulted in the imprisonment of many innocent people from border villages. The Bulgarian authorities also implemented internal exile against Macedonians who did not comply with the state policy. Macedonian researchers estimate that over 200 families were subjected to the internal exile. Shortly afterwards, Bulgarian authorities started equating "Titoists" with "Mihailovists", accusing both groups of sympathizing with Yugoslavia or advocating for an independent Macedonia under American protection. This policy culminated in a series of judicial processes, most notably the trial in March 1949 against participants of ASNOM and the Macedonian National Liberation Front, where activists faced sentences ranging from 15 years imprisonment to execution, including the February 1950 execution of four Macedonian partisans who had fought in the Democratic Army of Greece. In April 1950, Bulgarian authorities held trials in Blagoevgrad against twelve people accused of separatism and "Titoism", while at the same time Communist Party policies in Bansko provoked anti‑Bulgarian sentiment, expressed through slogans "Long live independent Macedonia – out with the Bulgarian occupiers". According to an official June 1952 report by the Bulgarian State Security, in the period 1948–1952, 193 families were deported from the Petrich region. 120 of these were labeled "traitors to the homeland" and the rest as "hostile elements". In the Blagoevgrad region, 405 families were deported. 215 of these were categorized as "traitors to the homeland" and the rest as "Mihailovists and fascists". A proposal to intern the relatives of these deportees in forced labour camps was approved by the head of the district of the Ministry of Internal Affairs in Blagoevgrad. The report concluded that "the expulsions had a positive effect on strengthening the border among the Pomak and Macedonian populations".

Hürriyet claimed that Macedonians in Bulgaria wishing to join Yugoslavia reportedly conducted guerilla warfare in 1951. Per Kathimerini, about 400 Macedonian prisoners were being held in the Belene labour camp in 1951. At that time, a significant collective identity did not crystallize in the Pirin region, which may be qualified as a Macedonian minority. According to modern Bulgarian authors and sources, such people were in fact not ethnic Macedonians who wish to join Yugoslavia, but IMRO right-wing activists, supporters of the idea about an Independent Macedonia. Some of them formed anti-communist detachments, while others were arrested by the communist authorities and interned in labour camps. However, based on reports from the Bulgarian Secret Services in 1956, even pro-Yugoslav Macedonian organizations from Bulgaria that wanted to unite Pirin Macedonia with SR Macedonia as part of SFR Yugoslavia were classified as "Mihajlovists" (originally IMRO anti-communist right-wing activists). Furthermore, there were also anti-communist armed groups composed of both ethnic Macedonian nationalists and ethnic Bulgarians (such as the group of Gerasim Todorov), as well as groups consisting exclusively of ethnic Macedonians (such as the group of Georgi Dukimov in Nevrokop). Per Bulgarian historian Mihail Gruev, Pirin Macedonia at that time became an arena of confrontation between the Macedonian separatism of the former IMRO, which was a kind of specific regional Bulgarian patriotism, and two different varieties of Macedonian nationalism – the Cominternist Macedonism of the IMRO (U), proclaimed by the communist authorities in Sofia, which retained some links with the Bulgarian national idea, and the Yugoslav Macedonism that emerged during World War II, propagated from Skopje, which stood at the foundations of the then rapidly developing modern Macedonian national identity. In 1954 the first action of Macedonian students appeared. The Macedonian students in Dupnitsa and Sofia demanded education in the Macedonian language, protested the classification of poets Nikola Vaptsarov and Hristo Smirnenski as Bulgarians, and accused Bulgarian leaders of Macedonian origin of "abandoning Macedonia". A state investigation found similar demands among pupils and teachers in Sandanski, resulting in one teacher's expulsion from the Communist Party. In 1956, according to the Bulgarian State Security, nationalist activity in Pirin Macedonia intensified, with seven known youth groups calling for unification of Pirin Macedonia with Yugoslavia. That same year, Macedonians from Petrich region signed a declaration and tried to send it to the Soviet Union hoping that Nikita Khrushchev is going to allow the unification, but the letter was intercepted. The groups were quickly discovered by the authorities and the organization was disbanded. One person was sent to Belene labour camp without trial, five were imprisoned, and more than ten were expelled from school. The regional party committee also expelled several members from local villages for separatism.

A change of policy came after Stalin's death in 1953. At the plenum of the Bulgarian Communist Party held in 1958, the decision was made that the Macedonian nation and language did not exist. Afterwards, the teaching of the Macedonian language was discontinued and the Macedonian teachers from Yugoslavia were expelled. By the late 1950s, as Bulgaria abandoned its policy of "Macedonization", BCP officials expressed concern that a large part of the Pirin population still identified as Macedonian, which sparked both individual and organized resistance. Since 1958, Bulgaria has not recognized a Macedonian minority in the Pirin region and in the following ten years, the 178,862 strong Macedonian population fell to just 1,600. The March Plenum of the Central Committee of the BCP openly denounces any notion of "a separate Macedonian nation" in Bulgaria. However, in 1960 the Bulgarian State Security reported that they revealed youth organizations where Blagoevgrad region occupies a leading position, indicating that most of them are on "nationalist" Macedonian base. In 1964 four people were tried for writing: "We are Macedonians" and "Long live the Macedonian nation" on a restaurant wall.

In 1964–1965, Bulgarian authorities launched a campaign in Pirin Macedonia to replace the passports of the ethnic Macedonians and register them as Bulgarians in passports. Initially, around 30,000 people (11%) insisted on identifying as Macedonians. Those who refused to change their passports faced pressures and repression of various kinds, and their passports were torn up or confiscated by the police when they used them to identify themselves. In the 1965 census, the number of ethnic Macedonians in Pirin Macedonia dropped from 178,862 to only 1,437 (0.4%), while in the other parts of Bulgaria the number of Macedonians remained similar to the previous census. According to the memoirs from the repressed, the 1964–1965 "re-Bulgarisation" campaign in Pirin Macedonia was enforced through organized assemblies, intimidation, and census enumerators who forcibly registered residents as Bulgarians, refusing requests to be identified as Macedonians or even Slavs. Individuals who resisted, such as music teacher Pandelej Paskov (punished for singing Macedonian patriotic songs) or the village headman of Skrat (who wrote in his census card "by order of the Bulgarian Communist Party I declare that I am a Bulgarian"), faced repercussions including exile and family suffering. This sparked frequent resistance among youth in the Sandanski and Petrich regions, described by the Bulgarian secret services as "anti-national" and "treacherous". The resistance by the minority groups ultimately led to the removal of the "nationality" column from Bulgarian passports to prevent future ethnic registration disputes.

=== After fall of communism ===
After the fall of communism, Macedonians continued to face severe discrimination. In the early 1990s various associations have been set up to represent the minority, these include the association United Macedonian Organisation (UMO-Ilinden), the political party United Macedonian Organisation: Ilinden–Pirin (UMO Ilinden-Pirin) and the Internal Macedonian Revolutionary Organisation - Independent (IMRO-I). These organizations have called for the restoration of rights granted to Macedonians during the 1940s and 1950s. However, such organizations in Pirin were restrained by Bulgarian authorities in the 1990s. Police also prevented ethnic Macedonians from commemorating Jane Sandanski at his gravesite. The Republic of Bulgaria has not recognized the Macedonian language. However, in 1999 the linguistic controversy between the two countries was solved with the help of the phrase: "the official language of the country in accordance with its constitution".

Meanwhile, in 1999, Ivan Kostov and Lyubcho Georgievski, the prime ministers of Bulgaria and Macedonia respectively, signed a common declaration, which proclaimed that no Macedonian minority exists within Bulgaria.

In 2006, according to a personal evaluation of a leading local ethnic Macedonian political activist Stoyko Stoykov, the present number of Bulgarian citizens with ethnic Macedonian self-consciousness is between 5,000 and 10,000. He has claimed that the result of the 2011 census, which counted only 1,654 Macedonians is a consequence of manipulation. Stoykov has explained that from this figure, even about 1,000 people were registered as Macedonia citizens. According to the Bulgarian Helsinki Committee, the vast majority of the population in Pirin Macedonia has a Bulgarian national self-consciousness and a regional Macedonian identity similar to the Macedonian regional identity in Greek Macedonia. Moreover, the majority of Bulgarians believe that most of the population of North Macedonia is Bulgarian. In 2019, Bulgaria adopted a framework position on the EU accession of North Macedonia, in which it demanded that North Macedonia refrain from supporting the Macedonian minority in the country in any way and re-affirmed its non-recognition of the minority. Bulgaria maintained this stance despite repeated European Court of Human Rights rulings urging such recognition, which Bulgaria has ignored.

In 2021, Krassimir Kanev, the president of Bulgarian Helsinki Committee stated in an interview that "anyone who declares themselves as Macedonian in Bulgaria may be subjected to harassment".

While the repressive nationality policies of the communist era under Todor Zhivkov have been largely mitigated for the other minorities in Bulgaria since 1989, most of Bulgaria's official positions towards ethnic Macedonians remain unchanged, continuing the communist-era policy still implemented today.

== Census results ==
Historical population
Year	Pop.	±%
1934	not available	—
1946	169,544	—
1956	187,789	+10.8%
1965	9,632	−94.9%
1992	10,803	+12.2%
2001	5,071	−53.1%
2011	1,654	−67.4%
2021	1,143	−30.9%

=== Government intervention ===
From 20 to 31 December 1946, the People's Republic of Bulgaria conducted a census during which, on 27 December the governor of Blagoevgrad districts sent a telegram with an order all Bulgarians (excluding the ones migrated from other regions of Bulgaria) in the region to be counted as ethnic Macedonians, including the Bulgarian Muslims. According to the census results 169,544 people of Bulgaria declared themselves to be ethnic Macedonians. Of the total 252,908 inhabitants of Blagoevgrad Province 160,541 or roughly 64% of the population declared themselves to be ethnic Macedonians. Other areas of Macedonian declaration was 2,638 in Sofia, 2,589 in Plovdiv, 1,825 in Burgas and a further 1,851 were scattered throughout Bulgaria.

The forcible change of the ethnicity of the population was confirmed by the leader of the opposition party BZNS "Nikola Petkov" who on 30 December 1946 stated that "the population is disgusted by this outrageous violation of conscience." This issue was confirmed by the ex-president of the Republic of Bulgaria Petar Stoyanov and Veselin Angelov (аssoc scientist, Ph.D. in history), from the Regional Historical Museum of Blagoevgrad - where the document with the order is kept.

Ethnic Groups in Blagoevgrad (1946 Census)	Nevrokop	%	Gorna Dzumaya	%	Sveti Vrach	%	Petrich	%	Razlog	%	Total	%
Ethnic Macedonians	29,251	45.1%	24 169	47%	41,247	82.5%	42,047	91%	23,837	60%	160 541	63.64%
Bulgarians	14,007	21.5%	24,825	48.3%	7,600	15.1%	2,927	6.4%	5,066	12.8%	54,425	21.5%
Macedonian or Bulgarian Muslims	18,174	27.9%	874	1.7%	55	0.1%	35	0,1%	9,786	24.6%	28 924	3.03%

There are strong indications that the majority of the population from Blagoevgrad Province was listed as ethnic Macedonians against their will in the 1946 census.

Since April 1956, the new communist leader Todor Zhivkov, carried out a policy of relative political liberalisation and de-Stalinization in Bulgaria, similar to the Khrushchev Thaw in the Soviet Union. Per Tchavdar Marinov the directives for the 1956 census emphasized that the gross error of the first census from 1946 should not be allowed. The party-state leadership decided that those previously officially registered as "Macedonians" could now define themselves "as they feel and that everyone should freely determine their nationality, without any violence". According to Raymond Detrez and James Pettifer, the Bulgarian regime pressured the Macedonians to declare as Bulgarians in the December 1956 census, and despite the pressures, 187,789 people of Bulgaria declared themselves to be ethnic Macedonians. According to Stefan Troebst and Ulrich Büchsenschütz, these results were product of repression and political pressure on the population to identify themselves as "Macedonians". However, according to a BCP official in Pirin, any pressure that existed in 1956 was directed toward Bulgarian self-identification, confirming that the political climate favored declaring oneself as Bulgarian rather than Macedonian. Of the 281,015 inhabitants of Blagoevgrad Province, 178,862 people declared themselves to be Macedonians; a rate which stayed the same at roughly 64% of the population. Other areas of Macedonian declaration consisted of: 4,046 from Sofia, 1,955 from Plovdiv and the remaining 2,926 were scattered throughout Bulgaria.

The change in the population came in 1965 census, when the people in the province declared free as Bulgarians, within ten years the 187,789 strong Macedonian minority fell to just 9,632 individuals. The 1965 census counted only 9,632 people declaring themselves to be Macedonians. While the number of Macedonians from other parts of Bulgaria did not change compared to previous censuses (c. 8–9,000), the number of Macedonians in the district of Blagoevgrad fell to 1,432 in the 1965 census. The Communist Party of Bulgaria insisted at the time that the process had been completed in a completely "free" manner, but 20 years later Zhivkov mentioned a "manoeuvre" he had employed, known only to four persons, to turn the all the population of the region of Pirin into Bulgarians "within a few days". Some researchers described this process as "statistical genocide" of the Macedonian minority.

=== Government intervention withdrawn ===
In the 1992 census, 10,803 people declared themselves to be Macedonian. Of them, 3,500 registered Macedonian as their mother tongue. According to the President of the Bulgarian Helsinki Committee Krasimir Kanev in 1998, the number of Macedonians in Bulgaria varied from 15,000 to 25,000.

Results of the 2001 census in the Blagoevgrad region of Bulgaria.

Ethnic Groups in Blagoevgrad Province (2001 Census)	Total	%
Bulgarians	286,491	83.97%
Ethnic Macedonians	3117	0.91%
Others	51,565	15.12%
Total	341,173	100.00%

As regards self-identification, a total of 1,654 people officially declared themselves to be ethnic Macedonians in the latest Bulgarian census in 2011 (0,02%) and 561 of them are in Blagoevgrad Province (0,2%). There are 1,091 citizens of North Macedonia who are permanent residents in Bulgaria.

== Political representation ==
The UMO Ilinden-Pirin party claims to represent the ethnic Macedonian minority in Bulgaria. In 2007 it was accepted as member of the European Free Alliance. On 29 February 2000, by decision of the Bulgarian Constitutional Court, UMO Ilinden–Pirin was banned, as a separatist party, which is banned by the Bulgarian constitution, which also forbids parties on ethnic and religious grounds. Without a political party of their own, Macedonian voters in Bulgaria were left to choose among other parties, all of which rejected the existence of a distinct Macedonian identity. On 25 November, the European Court of Human Rights in Strasbourg condemned Bulgaria because of violations of the UMO Ilinden–Pirin's freedom of organizing meetings. The court stated that Bulgaria had violated Act 11 from the European Convention of Human Rights.

Many other Macedonian organizations have been set up since the fall of communism they include; Independent Macedonian Association – Ilinden, Traditional Macedonian Organization — TMO, Union for the Prosperity of Pirin Macedonia, Committee on the Repression of Macedonians in the Pirin part of Macedonia, Solidarity and Struggle Committee of Pirin Macedonia, the Macedonian Democratic Party and the People's Academy of Pirin Macedonia.

On 30 October 2022, a Macedonian culture club named after Nikola Vaptsarov was opened. Prior to the opening of the club, on 18 October 2022, the Council of the Blagoevgrad Municipality adopted a declaration which banned the opening of the club. During the opening a verbal incident occurred, and delegations were blocked laying wreaths on the Gotse Delchev monument in Blagoevgrad by members of VMRO-BND.

On 4 February 2023, the glass façade of the club was smashed by unknown individuals with stones on 4 February 2023. Multiple people were arrested. The perpetrators stated that their actions were a response to Bulgarian citizens being stopped at the border and denied entry when they attempted to pay their respects to the remains of Gotse Delchev in Skopje on the occasion of the 151st anniversary of his birth. The incident was condemned by North Macedonia's president, Stevo Pendarovski, and by the European Free Alliance.

== Macedonian-language media ==
In 1947 the newspaper Pirinski Vestnik (Pirin Newspaper) was established and a "Macedonian Book" publishing company were set up. These were part of the measures to promote the Macedonian language and consciousness and were subsequently shut down in 1958. In the early 1990s a new newspaper was established for the ethnic Macedonian minority in Blagoevgrad Province, it is called Narodna Volja and its main office is in Blagoevgrad. The ideology of the newspaper is similar to official state policies and historiography in North Macedonia. Among its main topics are the history and culture of Macedonia and the Macedonians in Bulgaria.

== Reports by European and International Human Rights Bodies ==
=== European Court of Human Rights Decisions and European Parliament ===
Macedonians have been refused the right to register political parties (see United Macedonian Organization Ilinden and OMO Ilinden - PIRIN) on the grounds that the party was an "ethnic separatist organization funded by a foreign government", something that is against the Bulgarian constitution. The constitutional court has not however banned the Evroroma (Евророма) and MRF(ДПС) parties, who are widely considered as ethnic parties. The European Court of Human Rights held "unanimously, that there had been a violation of Article 11 (freedom of assembly and association) of the European Convention on Human Rights."

In November 2006, the members of the European Parliament Milan Horáček, Joost Lagendijk, Angelika Beer and Elly de Groen-Kouwenhoven introduced an amendment to the accession of Bulgaria to the European Union protocol calling "on the Bulgarian authorities to prevent any further obstruction to the registration of the political party of the ethnic Macedonians (OMO-Ilinden PIRIN) and to put an end to all forms of discrimination and harassment vis-à-vis that minority."

On 28 May 2018, the European Court of Human Rights made two decisive rulings against Bulgaria in violation of Article 11 (freedom of assembly and association) of the Convention for the Protection of Human Rights and Fundamental Freedoms. In the two rulings: Case of Vasilev and Society of the Repressed Macedonians in Bulgaria Victims of the Communist Terror v. Bulgaria (Application no. 23702/15); and Case of Macedonian Club for Ethnic Tolerance in Bulgaria and Radonov v. Bulgaria (Application no. 67197/13), the European Court of Human Rights unanimously ruled that Bulgaria violated Article 11 (freedom of assembly and association) of the Convention for the Protection of Human Rights and Fundamental Freedoms, and that Bulgaria must pay a collective total of 16,000 euros to the applicants.

In 2023, the Committee of Ministers of the Council of Europe urged Bulgaria to take decisive action to ensure the freedom of association of UMO Ilinden and similar Macedonian organizations. The Committee noted that Bulgaria had failed to implement multiple European Court of Human Rights judgments for over 17 years and called on the authorities to adopt measures that would guarantee compliance with Article 11 of the European Convention on Human Rights.

In 2024, the Council of Europe's Advisory Committee concluded that people identifying as Macedonians in Bulgaria are unable to enjoy access to individual minority rights under the Framework Convention for the Protection of National Minorities. It found that Bulgarian authorities continue to deny their existence as a minority and block the registration of their associations, despite repeated European Court of Human Rights rulings. The Committee urged Bulgaria to adopt a more pragmatic approach based on free self‑identification and to ensure effective protection of minority rights.

=== United Nations Treaty Bodies ===
In November 2023 the United Nations Committee on the Elimination of Racial Discrimination (CERD) raised concerns about Bulgaria's refusal to recognize a Macedonian minority, noting repeated denials of registration for Macedonian organizations and political parties, and highlighting ongoing cases before the European Court of Human Rights. While the Committee noted Bulgaria's claim that all citizens may self-identify, it expressed concern over restrictions on Macedonian groups' freedom of assembly and association, and recommended that Bulgaria implement European Court rulings, remove barriers to registering minority associations, and support their activities.

In April 2026, after a complaint by an ethnic Macedonian from Bulgaria and co-president of UMO Ilinden-Pirin, the UN Human Rights Committee concluded that Bulgaria violated the right to freedom of association when domestic courts rejected his application to register a non‑profit human rights organisation without valid legal justification. The Committee concluded that the decisions were excessively formalistic, failed to provide clear reasoning, and called on Bulgaria to review the rulings and compensate the complainant.

=== Amnesty International ===
In 2007, Amnesty International reported that the Bulgarian authorities and the judiciary have consistently denied the existence of a Macedonian minority in Bulgaria, insisting that there is no legal obligation to protect this group, a position that was supported by all political parties represented in parliament. The report also noted that despite European Court of Human Rights rulings that Bulgaria had violated the right to freedom of association, the authorities continued to refuse registration of UMO Ilinden-Pirin.

== Notable individuals ==
- Dimitar Blagoev (1856–1924), political leader and philosopher
- Krsto Enčev, co-founder of Narodna Volja ("People's Will") newspaper
- Georgi Hristov, poet
- Vasil Ivanovski (1906–1991), journalist
- Ivan Katardžiev (1926–2018), historian and politician
- Jordan Kostadinov, ethnic Macedonian rights activist, co-founder of OMO Ilinden Party
- Slave Makedonski, poet and writer
- Venko Markovski (1915–1988), writer, poet, and partisan
- Krste Misirkov (1874–1926), philologist, writer, historian, and ethnographer
- Katerina Nurdzhieva (1922–2018), ethnic Macedonian activist
- Georgi Radulov, professor
- Boris Sarafov (1872–1907), IMRO revolutionary
- Mihail Smatrakalev, poet and activist
- Georgi Solunski, actor
- Stojko Stojkov (historian), historian and journalist
- Stefan Vlahov Micov, political activist

== See also ==
- Bulgaria–North Macedonia relations
- Bulgarians in North Macedonia
- Ethnic groups in Bulgaria
- Macedonian diaspora
