= Aydarov =

Aydarov (Russian: Айда́ров; masculine) or Aydarova (Айда́рова; feminine) is a Russian last name. It derives either from the Turkic male first name Aydar, which was occasionally used by Russians as a secular name, or from the Volga region dialectal word "айдар" (aydar), which referred to a certain type of a Cossack haircut and was used as a nickname given to people with that kind of haircut.

People with the last name

- Alexei Aidarov (Alexey Aydarov) (b. 1974), Ukrainian biathlete
- Sergei Aydarov (b. 1998), Russian footballer
- Sergey Aydarov, actor playing a steward in the 1922 Soviet movie Polikushka

== See also ==
- Aydarovo, several rural localities in Russia
