= Bulgaria–North Macedonia relations =

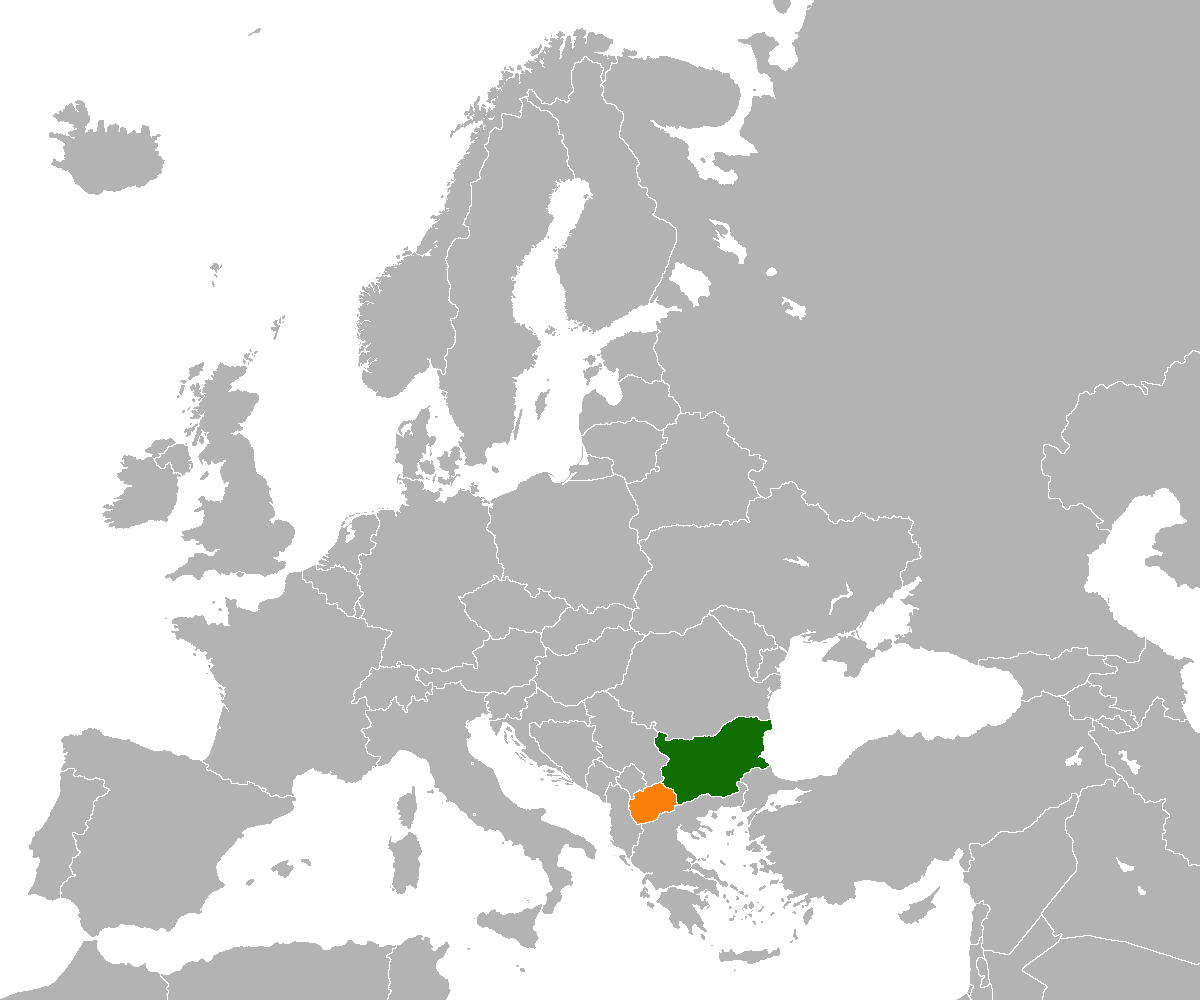

- Bulgaria: North Macedonia

Bilateral relations exist between the Republic of Bulgaria and the Republic of North Macedonia. Both countries are members of the Council of Europe and NATO. Bulgaria is a member of the European Union, while North Macedonia has been an official candidate to join the EU since 2005. While Bulgaria had been the first country to recognize the independence of its neighbour in 1992 and both states signed a friendship treaty in 2017, North Macedonia and Bulgaria still have complicated neighborly relations: the Bulgarian factor is known in Macedonian politics as "B-complex". European politics have been adding to the complexity of constellations.

In 2020, Bulgaria offered a compromise and agreed to recognize the Macedonian language and national identity if North Macedonia would recognize both nations and languages have common historical roots. This proposal was rejected by North Macedonia as threatening. The acknowledgement of Bulgarian influence on Macedonian history is highly problematic for many Macedonians, because it clashes with the post-WWII Yugoslav Macedonian nation-building narrative, which was based on a deeply anti-Bulgarian stance. Another revisionist strand of Macedonian historiography is that their national history had already been taken earlier by the Bulgarian national historiography. The resurgence of Bulgarian irredentism due to the deepening of chauvinism and national historical myths in post-Communist Bulgaria has awarded Macedonia a sacred place in Bulgarian nationalism, as Bulgarians are frustrated with the existence of a Macedonian nation, which they consider "artificial", and of a Macedonian language, which they consider a dialect of Bulgarian.

After the Mickoski government came to power in 2024, North Macedonia's relations with Bulgaria deteriorated to the point that in July 2026, the President of North Macedonia, Siljanovska, described them as if they were severed.

== History ==
=== Background ===
On January 15, 1992, Bulgaria was the first country to recognize the independence of the then-Republic of Macedonia. Bulgaria has however refused to recognize the existence of a separate ethnic Macedonian nation and a separate Macedonian language. It argues that ethnic Macedonians are a subgroup of the Bulgarian nation, and that the Macedonian language is a Bulgarian dialect. This leads to some complications when signing treaties between the two countries. Such treaties are signed with this long phrase at the end: "done in the official languages of the two states—the Bulgarian language, according to the Constitution of the Republic of Bulgaria, and the Macedonian language, according to the Constitution of the Republic of North Macedonia". North Macedonia has developed its relations with Bulgaria in the political, economic, and military spheres. The governments of the two countries have worked to improve business relations. A landlocked Macedonia relied heavily on Greek ports like Thessaloniki. When Greece imposed a major trade embargo and port blockade in 1994-1995, Macedonia circumvented the embargo by importing vital supplies through Bulgaria's Black Sea ports. The rules governing good neighbourly relations agreed between Bulgaria and North Macedonia were set in the Joint Declaration of February 22, 1999 reaffirmed by a joint memorandum signed on January 22, 2008, in Sofia. In 1999 and 2001, Bulgaria provided 94 T-55 tanks and various heavy mortars, munitions and firearm to North Macedonia. These aided in defending the country's sovereignty during a domestic Albanian insurgency.

On the other hand, according to political scientist Mirjana Maleska, while in SR Macedonia, the Bulgarophobia almost reached the level of state ideology, creating negative stereotypes for Bulgaria and its people, and continued after the fall of the communism with less intensity. These sentiments come partly from tragic historical events that Macedonians suffered caused by Bulgarian nationalists and chauvinists, but primarily results from the need to distinguish the Macedonian nation and state from Bulgaria. As a result, Skopje treats as "ethnic Macedonians" a number of figures from Bulgarian history from the region during the period from the 9th century to the end of the Second World War. Reacting to the publication of a controversial encyclopedia by the Macedonian Academy of Sciences and Arts (MANU) in 2009, Bulgaria warned that "it is unacceptable for a country aspirant for NATO and EU membership to resort to terminology typical for the ideology of the Cold War era," and that the encyclopedia "gives no contribution to the strengthening of the neighborly relations and curbing down of 'hate speech'." In connection with the administrative, police and other types of pressure allegedly being exercised on citizens of Bulgaria and citizens of North Macedonia with Bulgarian self-identification in North Macedonia, on August 4, 2009, the Bulgarian Foreign Ministry declared that "Bulgaria will examine the approach of the Macedonian side in such cases as one of the criteria on the basis of which to assess the country's readiness to make the changes that would allow the European integration of the Republic of North Macedonia." Bulgaria has proposed to sign a treaty (based on that 1999 Joint Declaration) guaranteeing the good neighbourly relations between the two countries, in order to enable Bulgarian support for the accession of North Macedonia to the European Union. Thousands of citizens of North Macedonia have applied for Bulgarian citizenship, with more than 100,000 having already received Bulgarian passports. In order to obtain the passport, the citizens of North Macedonia who apply for Bulgarian citizenship must prove that they have Bulgarian origins and a Bulgarian national consciousness. Between January 1 to November 18, 2011, the Bulgarian Council for citizenship considered 22,241 applications for citizenship, of which 13,607 were approved. However, the majority of applicants are motivated primarily by economic opportunities rather than Bulgarian ethnic identity, often declaring origin based on false statements or falsified certificates of Bulgarian origin.

=== Friendship treaty and beyond ===
The Governments of Bulgaria and North Macedonia signed a friendship treaty to bolster the relations between the two Balkan states on 1 August 2017. The so-called Treaty of Friendship, Good-Neighbourliness and Cooperation was ratified by the Parliaments of the Republic of North Macedonia and Bulgaria on 15 and 18 January 2018, respectively. A joint commission on historical and educational issues was formed in 2018 to serve as a forum where controversial, historical and educational issues could be raised and discussed. According to the reports, this commission has made little progress in its work for a period of one year. In October 2019, Bulgaria set out a "framework position", warning that it would block the EU accession process unless North Macedonia fulfilled a number of demands regarding what Bulgaria perceived as "anti-Bulgarian ideology" in the country. In October 2020, Bulgaria offered a compromise and agreed to recognize the Macedonian language and Macedonian identity if North Macedonia recognizes that they historically had Bulgarian roots. Foreign Minister Ekaterina Zaharieva said that "just as we are ready to acknowledge the reality, so they must acknowledge the past." 30 Bulgarian historians, scholars and professors published a letter opposing the memorandum sent by the Bulgarian government to EU member states, in which they argued that Macedonian ethnogenesis is similar to that of other nations and rejected its presentation as a product of "Yugoslav propaganda" along with the official Bulgarian interpretation of a common Bulgaro-Macedonian history as unilaterally Bulgarian. The Bulgarian proposal was rejected by North Macedonia. Macedonian President Pendarovski and Prime Minister Zaev announced that they were neither negotiating nor would ever negotiate whether the Macedonian language and identity were related historically to Bulgaria. As a result, on November 17, 2020, Bulgaria refused to approve the European Union's negotiation framework for North Macedonia, effectively blocking the official start of accession talks with this country. Germany and the EU institutions criticized Sofia's unconstructive behavior. According to Polish political scientist Tomasz Kamusella, Bulgaria's EU membership should not be weaponized as an instrument of pressure on EU candidate states to spread Bulgarian ethnopolitical influence across the region, from Moldova to North Macedonia and Albania.

In an interview with Bulgarian media in November 2020, Prime Minister Zoran Zaev acknowledged many historical facts about the common history of both peoples that have been altered and concealed for decades in North Macedonia. The interview sparked controversy and was followed by a wave of nationalism in Skopje, as well by protests demanding Zaev's resignation. According to the opinion of the former Macedonian Prime Minister Ljubčo Georgievski, who insists on the Bulgarian roots of the Macedonians, these reactions were the result of ignorance, hypocrisy or politicking. He said that the “deep state” in North Macedonia disrupted the normal relations between the two countries. It built hatred and enmity towards Bulgaria. Expressions of anti-Bulgarian sentiment remain a serious concern with the repeated burning of Bulgarian flags. These actions have been condemned strongly by Stevo Pendarovski, President of North Macedonia, and by Ekaterina Zakharieva, Foreign Minister of Bulgaria.

In late March 2021, after it was discovered that the Macedonian government under Zoran Zaev had been funding an institute called the International Institute for Middle East and Balkan Studies (IFIMES) between 2017 and 2020 a scandal erupted in Bulgaria. IFIMES had published a number of articles describing Bulgaria and Germany as “mafia states interested in Nazism”. This was perceived in Bulgaria as a defamation campaign funded by North Macedonia in order to discredit Bulgaria in front of its EU partners. The government of North Macedonia has denied these Bulgarian claims.

On 18 January 2022, the two new prime ministers, Kiril Petkov of Bulgaria and Dimitar Kovačevski of North Macedonia, met in Skopje, seeking to improve relations talks and discussing EU negotiations and other issues to be resolved. Five months later, on 24 June 2022, Bulgaria's parliament approved the lifting of the country's veto on opening EU accession talks with North Macedonia. Bulgaria insists on recognition of Bulgarian minority in the constitution of North Macedonia. In June 2022, France proposed a compromise to lift Bulgaria's veto on North Macedonia's EU accession, which Bulgaria accepted with reservations regarding the Macedonian language and identity, while North Macedonia's government initially rejected it before considering a revised "cosmetic" version announced by President Macron. This deal sparked large demonstrations in Skopje starting July 2, as opponents argued the proposal threatened national identity by requiring constitutional recognition of a Bulgarian minority and implicitly accepting Bulgarian historical narratives. However, on July 17, 2022, the foreign ministers of the both countries signed a bilateral protocol in Sofia implementing the French proposal, which lifted Bulgaria's veto on EU accession talks in exchange for North Macedonia's commitment to amend its constitution to recognize the Bulgarian minority. Numerous provocative statements by Bulgarian officials during that period contributed to a negative atmosphere and fueled nationalism in North Macedonia, and despite the Macedonian government's acceptance of the French proposal in July 2022 with a parliamentary vote of 68, it failed to reach the required two-thirds majority for constitutional amendments due to opposition from the VMRO-DPMNE party, whilst the majority of the population were also against the government's decision.

People that stuck to their Bulgarian identity in North Macedonia during the 1990s met hostility among the authorities and the rest of the population. Trials against Bulgarophiles have periodically occurred there. Hostility towards Bulgarians in North Macedonia has been regularly manifested as public hate speech, discrimination, and targeted vandalism or violence. In 2001, the Radko association was declared unconstitutional and banned by the Constitutional Court of the Republic of Macedonia. However, the European Court of Human Rights held that the dissolution of the Association infringed Article 11 of the European Convention on Human Rights. The court ordered the Macedonian state to pay five thousand euros in respect of non-pecuniary damage and four thousand euros in respect of costs and expenses. The state paid the compensation and the Committee of Ministers, having verified that the respondent state adopted all necessary individual and general measures to comply with the European Court of Human Rights' judgment, officially declared its supervisory functions fulfilled and closed the case. In 2022, the Jews in North Macedonia condemned naming Bulgarian cultural associations after Nazi German collaborators such as "Tsar Boris III" and "Ivan Mihailov". In October 2022, the lawyer Toni Menkinoski filled an initiative against the Bulgarian association "Tsar Boris III" before the Constitutional Court of North Macedonia, claiming that it aimed to violently destroy the constitutional order and to incite national hatred in the country. In November the parliament of North Macedonia approved a law to ban political parties and groups named after personalities, regarded as being associated with fascism, and requested the associations to change the names to avoid being removed from the registers after 3 months. Bulgaria’s Foreign Ministry came up with the position that these law changes were aimed at discriminatory restrictions. Other Bulgarian cultural associations with non-controversial names were allowed to continue operating. There are total of 16 active Bulgarian organisations in North Macedonia of which nine are cultural associations. Per Bulgarian cultural anthropologist Ivaylo Ditchev, Bulgaria's claims of discrimination of people identifying as Bulgarians in North Macedonia are lacking substantial proof, as no case has made it to the ECtHR yet. In June 2026, European Parliament condemned the attempts to destroy Bulgarian historical heritage in North Macedonia. Regret was expressed over the destruction and falsification of Bulgarian historical inscriptions. Simultaneously, the Parliamentary Assembly of the Council of Europe was alerted to a persistent series of attacks against official Bulgarian institutions, local organizations, and Bulgarian citizens in North Macedonia. Per Prof. Angel Dimitrov, Bulgarian historian and diplomat, co-chair of the Joint multidisciplinary commission between Bulgaria and North Macedonia, the anti-Bulgarian propaganda in Macedonia has not had a day off since 1944.

On the other hand, while the repressive nationality policies of the communist era under Todor Zhivkov have been largely mitigated for the other minorities in Bulgaria since 1989, Macedonians continue to face severe discrimination. Bulgaria denies existence of Macedonian minority in Bulgaria–a stance rooted in communist-era policies under Todor Zhivkov and requires North Macedonia to renounce the claims of Macedonian minority in the country, and ignores repeated European Court of Human Rights rulings urging such recognition. Although Bulgarian cultural and civic organizations operate legally in North Macedonia without explicit constitutional recognition, Bulgaria continues to prohibit Macedonian organizations despite multiple European Court of Human Rights and United Nations rulings ordering their registration. Bulgaria also prohibits political parties representing the ethnic Macedonian minority. Under EU pressure during its accession process, Bulgaria briefly registered the Macedonian party UMO Ilinden-Pirin in 1999, only for the Constitutional Court to ban it the following year as a threat to state unity, leaving Macedonian voters to choose among parties that are denying their distinct ethnic identity. Despite repeated rulings by the ECtHR against Bulgaria's ban on UMO Ilinden-Pirin, Bulgarian authorities have systematically refused to register the party. Furthermore, in March 2026, Bulgaria issued an entry ban to Toni Menkinoski, a lawyer representing ethnic Macedonian organizations in Bulgaria before the European Court of Human Rights, under the pretext that he posed a threat to state security. This led to a reaction by the Prime Minister Hristijan Mickoski, who stated that "it's another point of shame for the democracy of our eastern neighbor". Commissioner for Human Rights Michael O'Flaherty announced an investigation on the case of entry ban. The Foreign Minister Timčo Mucunski criticized Bulgaria for using "retrograde mechanisms", and stated that he expects the EU not to support Bulgaria on that case. Bulgaria has been criticized for applying double standards to North Macedonia over minority rights. Hristijan Mickoski also criticized the EU for double standards over Bulgarian policy towards North Macedonia. The new government of North Macedonia regards Bulgaria's implementation of the ECHR rulings as a condition for introducing constitutional changes to recognize the Bulgarian minority in North Macedonia.

== International organizations ==
Bulgaria joined the EU in 2007, whereas North Macedonia is a candidate country. While Bulgaria joined NATO in 2004, North Macedonia joined in 2020.

== Resident diplomatic missions ==
- Bulgaria has an embassy in Skopje and consulate-general in Bitola.
- North Macedonia has an embassy in Sofia.
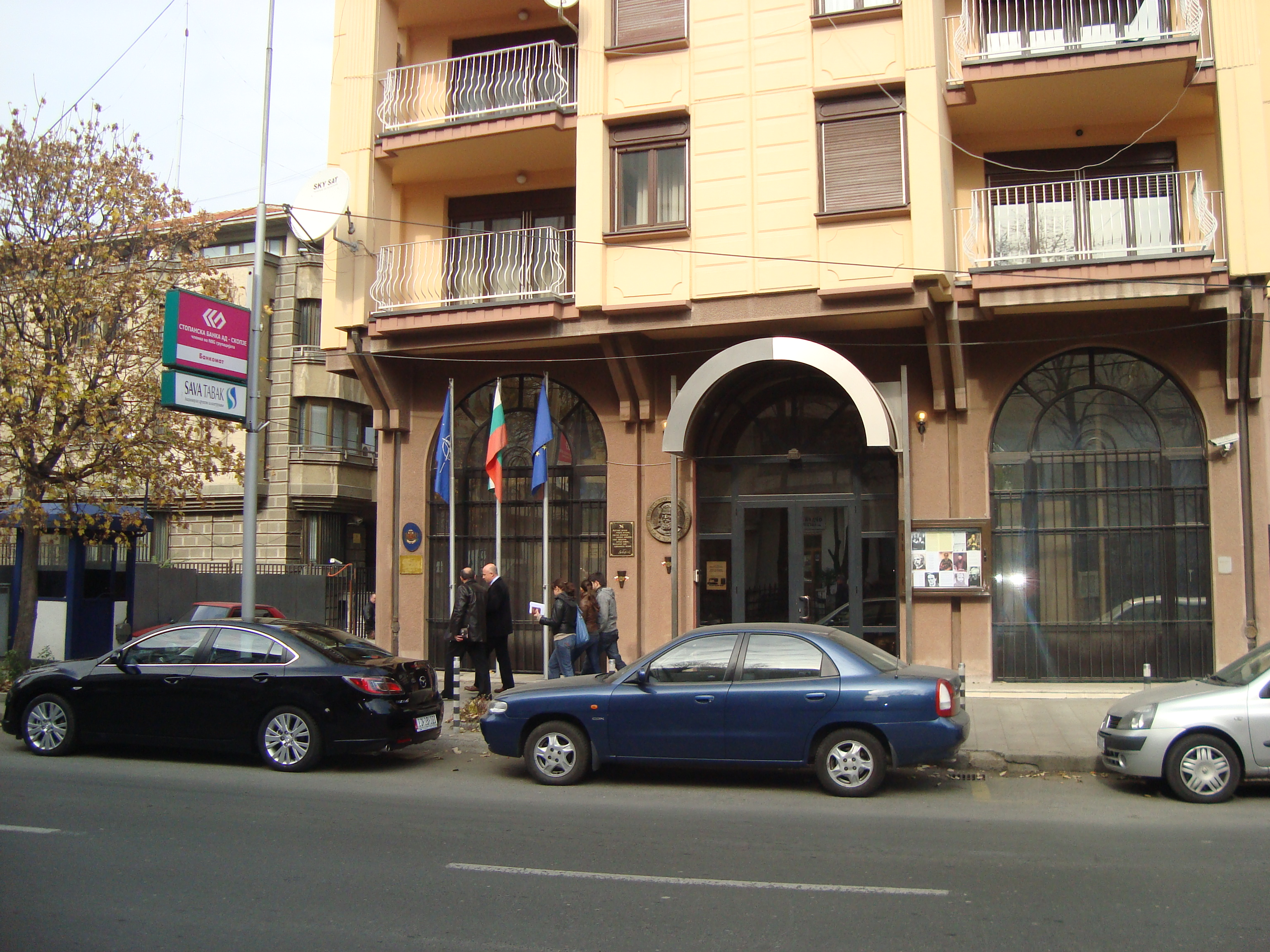
Embassy of Bulgaria in Skopje

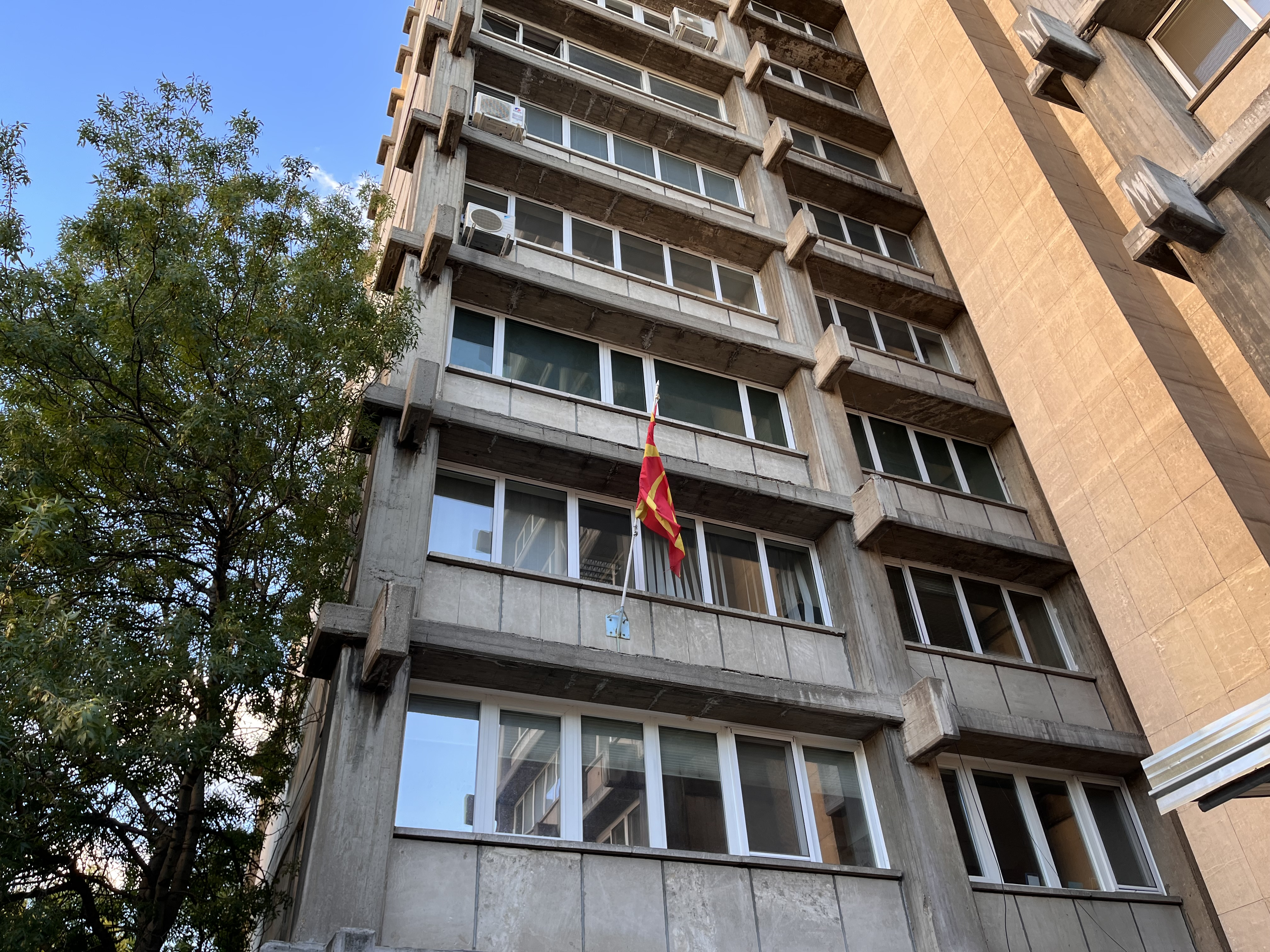
Embassy of North Macedonia in Sofia

== See also ==
- Macedonians in Bulgaria
- Bulgarians in North Macedonia
- Bulgaria–Yugoslavia relations
- Foreign relations of Bulgaria
- Foreign relations of North Macedonia
- Accession of North Macedonia to the European Union
