= Potential accession of North Macedonia to the European Union =

Ongoing accession process of North Macedonia to the EU

Process of potential accession of North Macedonia to the European Union
- Status: Candidate negotiating (screening complete)
Application
Membership application	24 March 2004
Screened & negotiations commence
Negotiations
Chapters closed	Not yet applicable
Memberships & Treaties
Association Agreement
Economic and monetary policy
Travel
Energy
Foreign and military policy
North Atlantic Treaty Organization (NATO)	27 March 2020
Human rights and international courts
International Court of Justice (ICJ)
Impact (27+1)
Population	446,828,803
Area	4,233,262 km^{2} 1,634,472 mi^{2}
HDI	0.896
GDP (PPP)	$25.399 trillion
GDP per capita (PPP)	$56,928
GDP	$17.818 trillion
GDP per capita	$39,940
Gini	30.0
Official Languages	24	25 + 1 (Macedonian)

The potential accession of North Macedonia to the European Union has been on the agenda for future enlargement of the EU since 2005, when it became an official candidate for accession. The then-Republic of Macedonia submitted its membership application in 2004, thirteen years after its independence from Yugoslavia. It is one of nine current EU candidate countries, together with Albania, Bosnia and Herzegovina, Georgia, Moldova, Montenegro, Serbia, Turkey and Ukraine.

The use of the country name "Macedonia" was the object of a dispute with neighbouring Greece between 1991 and 2019, resulting in a Greek veto against EU and NATO accession talks, which lasted from 2008 to 2019. After the issue was resolved, the EU gave its formal approval to begin accession talks with North Macedonia and Albania in March 2020.

However, in November 2020, Bulgaria effectively blocked the official start of North Macedonia's EU accession negotiations over what it perceives as slow progress on the implementation of the 2017 friendship treaty between the two countries, state-supported or tolerated hate speech and minority claims towards Macedonians in Bulgaria.

On 24 June 2022, Bulgaria's parliament approved lifting the country's veto on opening EU accession talks with North Macedonia. On 16 July 2022, the Assembly of North Macedonia also approved the revised French proposal, allowing accession negotiations to begin. The start of negotiations was officially launched on 19 July 2022. Continued support for North Macedonia’s EU path has been expressed by senior EU officials, including the EU Ambassador in Skopje, Michalis Rokas, who has emphasised that his primary mandate is to assist the country in joining the EU as swiftly as possible, highlighting the Union's unwavering commitment to support the integration process through necessary reforms that yield tangible benefits for its citizens. To make progress, however, the country must change its constitution to officially recognize local Bulgarians as an ethnic minority, and overcome the latent opposition of neighbouring Bulgaria. However, several parties have consistently blocked the parliamentary passage of the required constitutional amendment.

== History ==
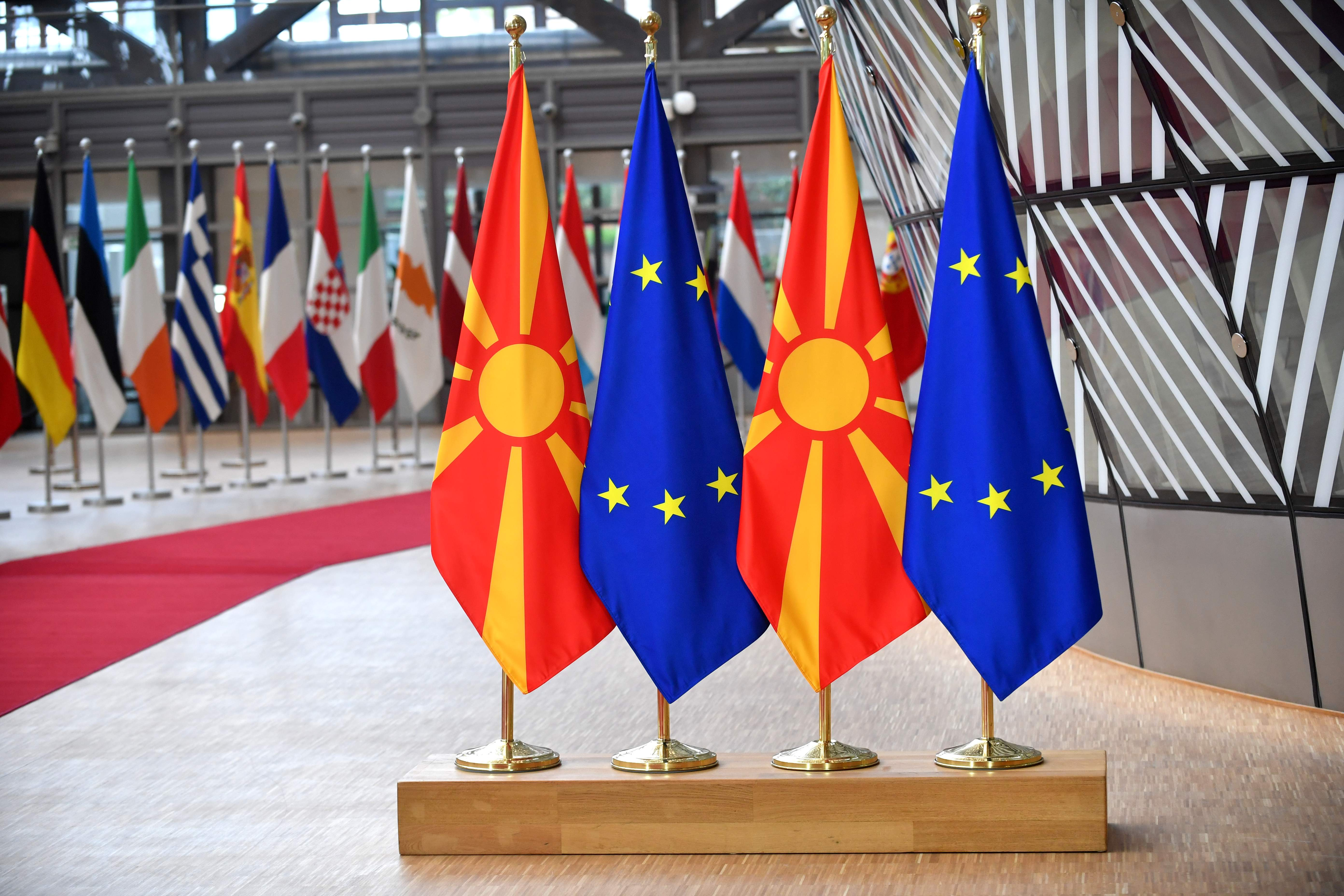
The flags of the European Union and North Macedonia

The Republic of Macedonia (now North Macedonia) began its formal process of rapprochement with the European Union in 2000, by initiating negotiations about the EU's Stabilisation and Association Process, and it became the first non-EU country in the Balkans to sign the Stabilisation and Association Agreement (SAA), on 9 April 2001 in Luxembourg. The agreement was ratified by the Macedonian parliament on 12 April 2001 and came into force on 1 April 2004.

On 22 March 2004, the Republic of Macedonia submitted its application for EU membership. On 6 September 2004, the Macedonian government adopted a National Strategy for European integration, supported by the country's parliament through its Commission for European Issues. The government subsequently began the procedure of answering the questionnaire of the European Commission regarding its performance in preparation for membership in accordance with the Copenhagen criteria, a process that was finished by 31 January 2005. The European Council officially granted the country candidate status on 17 December 2005, after a review and a positive recommendation of the candidacy by the European Commission.

After the naming dispute with Greece was solved in 2019, accession negotiations were expected to start within the same year, but in June 2019 the EU General Affairs Council decided to postpone the decision to October, due to objections from a number of countries including the Netherlands and France. France vetoed the decision again in October. On 25 March 2020 the Council of the European Union decided to open accession negotiations, which was endorsed by the European Council the following day.

On 17 November 2020 Bulgaria blocked the official start of accession talks with the country. North Macedonia was told to offer further guarantees to Bulgaria that it would honour the 2017 friendship treaty, which deals with historical issues.

=== Name dispute with Greece ===
A major obstacle for the accession process was the country's unresolved dispute with Greece over its name, as Greece argued that it implied territorial ambitions towards Greece's own northern province of Macedonia. While the country preferred to be called by its constitutional name, Republic of Macedonia, the European Union, in acknowledgment of concerns raised by Greece, maintained a practice of recognising it only as the "former Yugoslav Republic of Macedonia", a compromise of "provisional reference" introduced by the United Nations in 1993. Greece, as any other EU country, has veto power against new accessions, and blocked Macedonian accession due to the naming dispute.

On 12 June 2018, an agreement was reached between Greek prime minister Alexis Tsipras and his Macedonian counterpart Zoran Zaev, known as the Prespa agreement, under which the country would be renamed the "Republic of North Macedonia". As part of this deal, Greece explicitly withdrew its previous opposition, allowing the EU to approve on 26 June 2018 a pathway to starting accession talks.

=== Historical and linguistic dispute with Bulgaria ===
Although Bulgaria was the first country to recognise the independence of the then Republic of Macedonia, most of its academics, as well as the general public, do not recognise the Macedonian language and nation formed after the Second World War as being separate from Bulgarian proper. As part of the efforts to find a solution to the Macedonia name dispute with Greece, the Macedonian constitution was changed twice (in 1995, and then again in 2018) to formally exclude any possible territorial aspirations towards neighbouring countries.

Macedonia and Bulgaria signed a friendship treaty to improve their complicated relations in August 2017. A joint commission on historical and educational issues was formed in 2018 to serve as a forum where controversial historical and educational issues could be raised and discussed. The Bulgarian commission interprets the outcome of the work should be "common" history, which indicates sameness, while the Macedonian commission interprets is as "shared" history, which indicates it does not mean "same". The interpretation also came to a point of disagreement. The Macedonian commission, was composed of mostly younger generations of researchers, while the Bulgarian commission was composed mostly of senior diplomats. According to researcher Ulf Brunnbauer, the members of the Macedonian commission were selected because of their academic merits, while the Bulgarian members were selected because they were "heavyweights in politics of history". Furthermore, according to him, it is obvious that Bulgarian experts on Macedonia, who were against the Bulgarian nationalist mainstream, were left in absence. The commission has made little progress in its work. Despite the meetings, its work has stalled for years and did not advance beyond the medieval period.

In October 2019, Bulgaria set out a "Framework position" warning that it would block the accession process unless North Macedonia fulfilled demands regarding anti-Bulgarian ideology in the country, and ultimately over an "ongoing nation-building process" based on historical negationism of the Bulgarian identity, culture and legacy in the broader region of Macedonia.

Bulgarian politicians claim North Macedonia remains the only country in NATO, that is an EU-candidate, whose politics is based on communist historical and linguistic dogmas accepted by ASNOM. On the other hand, researchers claim that Bulgaria's official positions towards Macedonia are rooted in ideological positions dating back to the communist period under Todor Zhivkov. Concerning the Macedonian language, Bulgaria advises the EU to avoid using the term "Macedonian language" during the accession talks, and instead use the term "Official language of Republic of North Macedonia", reaffirming that it does not recognise the language as separate from Bulgarian. In North Macedonia this is widely perceived as a direct attack on its national identity and language.

In September 2020, Bulgaria sent an explanatory memorandum to the Council of the European Union containing its framework position on the accession of North Macedonia. The conditions required North Macedonia to adopt Bulgaria's version of the region's history and renounce any claims regarding the existence of a Macedonian minority in Bulgaria, despite repeated European Court of Human Rights rulings urging such recognition, which Bulgaria has ignored. On 17 November 2020, Bulgaria refused to approve the European Union's negotiation framework for North Macedonia, effectively blocking the official start of accession talks with this country over slow progress on the implementation of the 2017 Friendship Treaty between the two countries, state-supported or tolerated hate speech and minority claims towards Bulgaria. A survey conducted in November 2020, by Alpha Research of 803 people from all over Bulgaria, found that 83.8% of Bulgarians were against the accession of North Macedonia in the EU until the historical dispute is solved, only 10.2% of Bulgarians supported the accession with the rest not having an opinion.

Per political scientists Yorgos Christidis and Florian Bieber, and experts from European think tanks such as the Jacques Delors Institute, DGAP, the Clingendael Institute, and Carnegie Europe, the Bulgarian vetoes have undermined the EU's credibility in North Macedonia and across the Western Balkans. The vetoes also received condemnation by some Bulgarian intellectuals, and criticism from international observers.

In June 2022 at the very end of the French Presidency of the Council of the European Union (January–June), an urgent proposal was put out by the president Emmanuel Macron to resolve the dispute between the two countries. The proposal provoked a political crisis in Bulgaria. On June 8, Slavi Trifonov withdrew his party from Bulgaria's governing coalition, citing the issue of North Macedonia. This faced criticism from President Rumen Radev, who said the proposal was relatively good. However, the government abdicated its responsibility and delegated it entirely to the parliament. As result on 22 June the Bulgarian government faced a motion of no confidence, which it lost. Nevertheless, on 24 June, after heated discussions, the parliament approved lifting the veto. President Macron claimed that the European leaders had put a lot of pressure on Bulgaria to accept this deal, confirming its approval was a "very good signal". On June 25, the Ministry of Foreign Affairs in Sofia stated that the speed with which North Macedonia would approach the EU membership, already depended on itself. Two days before the end of the French presidency of the EU, the Prime Minister of North Macedonia Kovačevski stated that the government remains of the opinion that the agreement proposed from Paris and approved by Bulgaria is unacceptable for the country. However, since then, the proposal has been backed by the government of North Macedonia. A preliminary poll in July 2022 showed that over 70% of ethnic Macedonian respondents and 56% from the respondents as a whole rejected the French proposal, while only 15% of ethnic Macedonians and 29% of all respondents expressed support, underscoring widespread dissatisfaction with the negotiation framework. Per foreign policy analyst Edward P. Joseph in 2023, Levica, an Eurosceptic party, has been gaining increasing support among ethnic Macedonians as disillusionment with the EU was building. Small parties like Levica, Edinstvena Makedonija, and the Democratic Party of Serbs in Macedonia channeled frustration over EU vetoes and the French proposal into protests, digital campaigns, and parliamentary obstruction, radicalizing identity politics and cultivating ties with Russia, China, and Serbia, thereby turning marginal influence into durable anti-European platforms. In early July 2022, protests began in North Macedonia against the French proposal. However, the proposal was accepted by the Assembly of North Macedonia on 16 July 2022.

On 17 July 2022 in Sofia, the foreign ministers of Bulgaria and North Macedonia signed a second bilateral protocol to the Treaty of Good Neighborhood and Friendship between the two countries. Such protocols were supposed to be signed every year, but in practice they have not been signed since 2019. According to the decision of the Bulgarian National Assembly of June 24, the signing of this protocol is a condition for Bulgaria to approve the Negotiating Framework for the Republic of North Macedonia. The protocol contains specific measures and deadlines for the implementation of agreements on historical issues between the two countries, measures against hate speech, etc.

On 24 June 2022, Bulgaria's parliament approved lifting the country's veto on opening EU accession talks with North Macedonia. On 16 July 2022, the Assembly of North Macedonia also approved the revised French proposal, allowing accession negotiations to begin. The start of negotiations was officially launched on 19 July 2022. The approved document includes the condition to stop "hate speech" against all "minorities and communities", that North Macedonia recognise a shared history with Bulgaria, and the inclusion of Bulgarian people as a recognised minority in the Constitution. On July 17, North Macedonia signed a special protocol with Bulgaria to cooperate on these subjects. However, there was no progress in the inclusion of the Bulgarian minority in the Constitution of North Macedonia, though in February 2023, the Bulgarian parliament adopted a declaration condemning, an alleged anti-Bulgarian campaign there and warned it could stop North Macedonia's EU integration again. A week later, the Bulgarian sociologist and former Minister of Science and Education, Georgy Fotev, stated that the main problem for lack of progress lies in Bulgaria, where a parliamentary party, and a party with a Member of the European Parliament, deny the existence of the Macedonian nation and language, claiming instead that they are Bulgarian and that Macedonia is Bulgarian land. According to researchers, the French proposal incorporated bilateral historical and identity disputes directly into North Macedonia's official EU negotiation framework, which allowed the inclusion of issues contradictory to the criteria for accession, thereby creating potentially problematic precedent. Furthermore, think-tank researcher and former EU official Erwan Fouéré argued that Macron's proposal "basically endorsed the Bulgarian government's demands". Ulf Brunnbauer stated: "This whole episode shows how EU membership gives leverage to member states which can highjack the accession process in the name of agendas that have nothing to do with the EU at all." Per researchers, this stalled, non-merit based accession process undermines EU democratic standards, risks regional instability, and invites geopolitical interference from outside.

Following the formal start of accession negotiations in July 2022, the next step is for North Macedonia to meet the conditions to start substantial negotiations by the opening of the first 5 negotiating chapters (Fundamentals cluster) at a second intergovernmental conference. This step will not begin until the "opening phase" has been completed, which according to the Council conclusions of July 2022 is conditional on the Assembly of North Macedonia approving the agreed constitutional amendment related to the Bulgarian minority. A two-thirds majority vote in the Assembly of North Macedonia is needed in order to approve the required constitutional amendment. However, VMRO-DPMNE which insisted that the French proposal leads to "Bulgarianisation" of the country, has consistently blocked the passage of the required constitutional amendment and campaigned on the idea that the EU negotiation framework instead should be changed to omit this requirement. These policies directly contributed to the party's decisive victory at the elections in May 2024.

On 25 September 2024, the EU announced the decoupling of Albania from North Macedonia on the EU accession path, due to the disputes between North Macedonia and Bulgaria around the Bulgarian minority in North Macedonia, which had delayed further talks. Following the decision on decoupling of their processes, the EU opened negotiations on the first chapters with Albania separately on 15 October 2024.

According to foreign and domestic experts, Bulgaria's veto widened internal divisions in North Macedonia and turned EU accession prospects into "a nightmare of potentially endless Bulgarian demands". This situation is viewed as "perpetually destabilising for the country" and "a fiasco for EU politics". Fearing additional Bulgarian demands, the government of North Macedonia under Mickoski insists that constitutional changes could not proceed unless the EU provided credible assurances that this would be the final identity-related demand and that Bulgaria would not be able to impose further vetoes based on historical or linguistic disputes after the amendment is adopted.

Edward P. Joseph described Bulgaria as a "bully", claiming Bulgarian historical pretensions towards North Macedonia are similar to Serbia's posture toward Montenegro and Russia's stance toward Ukraine, and proposed that constitutional amendments linked to EU accession should contain a safeguard clause rendering them automatically void if the accession process is halted due to new bilateral demands from Bulgaria. He also argued that the EU is making a mistake by exerting pressure on North Macedonia to implement the agreement without providing clear guarantees that Bulgaria would adhere to its spirit and refrain from introducing new identity‑related demands. Furthermore, as the European Court of Human Rights has repeatedly found Bulgaria in violation of international conventions regarding the Macedonian minority, and its recommendations have remained unimplemented, Mickoski's government regards their implementation by Sofia as a second condition for introducing constitutional changes.

A 2026 survey by the Institute for Democracy "Societas Civilis", the Konrad Adenauer Foundation, and Wilfried Martens Centre for European Studies found that largest share of citizens (27%) preferred renegotiating the EU negotiation framework, 24% (backed by 57% of ethnic Albanians and only 11% of ethnic Macedonians) supported constitutional amendments, 21% expressed pessimism or passivity by answering "do nothing", 17% favored stopping the negotiation process, and 11% did not respond. In May 2026, the doyen of Macedonian diplomacy, Viktor Gaber, submitted a proposal to the parliament in Skopje to call a referendum to decide on the acceptance of the French proposal and the inclusion of Bulgarians in the country's constitution. The idea was also supported by the leader of the opposition SDSM, Venko Filipče. However, the government of Hristijan Mickoski refused to hold such a referendum. Around the same time, law professor Denko Maleski wrote about the historical dispute with Bulgaria, stating that North Macedonia is distancing itself from the French proposal (including shared history) as a solution to the dispute. According to Maleski, the EU stands behind Bulgaria and the Bulgarian interpretation of the shared history with Macedonians.

=== Annual reports on North Macedonia's progress towards EU accession ===
In July 2025 the European Parliament adopted a resolution on the report on North Macedonia's progress towards EU accession. According to the commission's report, North Macedonia continued to demonstrate a high level of alignment with EU foreign and security policy and moderate preparedness in most areas of the acquis, with progress noted in public administration reform, economic governance and anti‑corruption legislation, but concerns remained over judicial independence, political influence, corruption, public procurement and democratic oversight. The accession process was left stalled largely due to unresolved political and legal issues in relations with Bulgaria. The report also expressed concern about the roles of the Hungarian and Serbian Governments in advancing China's and Russia's geopolitical influence, and by the role of the "Serbian world" project in the country. It was claimed there that some representatives in Mickoski's government have promoted this concept, that aims to establish a Serbian influence on the Balkans.

On 3 June 2026, the European Parliament's Committee on Foreign Affairs (AFET) adopted its report on North Macedonia, reiterating full support for the country's EU membership aspirations based on measurable progress and strict but fair conditionality. The report noted lack of progress since 2025 and emphasized the need for renewed political commitment, constitutional amendments, cross‑party cooperation and effective parliamentary oversight, while welcoming North Macedonia's contributions to regional cooperation and stability through initiatives such as the Berlin Process, the Growth Plan for the Western Balkans and common regional market agreements. On June 17, the report was adopted by the European Parliament. It underlined its support for North Macedonia’s commitment to EU membership, but stressed the lack of progress, especially on the rule of law, judicial reforms and the corruption issues. The report urges the country to adopt the necessary constitutional amendments that would allow the opening of the first negotiation cluster. The European Parliament warned North Macedonia about the threat posed by the so-called “Serbian world” and emphasized that including Bulgarians in the country's constitution is a mandatory condition, calling on the country to open the archives of the Yugoslav Communist secret services. The report called also on the Joint Commission on Historical and Educational Issues between Bulgaria and North Macedonia to achieve results, based on verified historical sources and documents, in accordance with the Good-Neighborliness Treaty between both countries. Attempts to destroy and falsify Bulgarian historical heritage in the country were condemned.

== Domestic politics ==
=== EU funding ===
North Macedonia has so far received €1.3 billion of development aid until 2020 from the Instrument for Pre-Accession Assistance, a funding mechanism for EU candidate countries.

In November 2025, a corruption scandal involving the EU‑funded IPARD programme led to the arrest of several officials, including the director of the Agency for Financial Support of Agriculture and Rural Development, on charges of bribery. As a result, the European Commission suspended all IPARD III payments to the country. Following an audit which found no systemic irregularities, the suspension was lifted in April 2026 and funding was restored.

=== Campaign ===
The government's motto for the candidacy is "The Sun, too, is a star.", referring to the sun from the flag of North Macedonia being displayed among the other stars in the flag of Europe.

=== Government structuring ===
North Macedonia's government has established a management infrastructure for the European integration process on the basis of a paper adopted in 1997 under the title "The strategic bases of the Republic of [North] Macedonia on achieving the membership of the European Union". It consists of the following institutions:

- The Committee for Euro-Atlantic Integration plays the central role in the decision-making of the country's policies in the European integration process. It is chaired by the Prime Minister with members including Deputy Prime Ministers, all ministers in the Government, the Governor of the National Bank of North Macedonia, and the President of the Macedonian Academy of Sciences and Arts.
- The Working Committee for European Integration of the Government of the Republic of [North] Macedonia (WCEI) – It is chaired by the Deputy Prime Ministers in charge of EU Integration, whose deputy is the Minister of Economy. The members are the secretaries from all Ministries. It is an operational, inter-ministerial body establishing the methods and dynamics for implementation of strategic decisions, political guidelines and priorities of the Government, as well as monitoring the realisation of the concrete tasks.
- The Deputy to the President of the Government is responsible for the European integration as centre in the management and co-ordination of the operational part of the integration process. Its support and service is the Sector for European Integration within the General Secretariat of the Government of the former Yugoslav Republic of Macedonia.
- The Sector for European Integration within the Republic's government is given the task to organise, co-ordinate and synchronise the EU integration process. It is organised in seven units in charge of the approximation of the national legislation with that of the EU, translation of the EU legal acts, institution building, support to the WCEI, co-ordination of foreign assistance, and information to the broader public on EU and the European integration process.
- Departments/Sectors/Units for European Integration within the Ministries have similar structure and competencies as the central Sector for European Integration within the Government, being a key link in the institutional infrastructure.
- The Ministry of Foreign Affairs – EU domain – is responsible for communications with the EU structures through the Mission of former Yugoslav Republic of Macedonia in Brussels, gathering valid and timely information that have impact on the integration process and presenting the uniform perspectives and positions in the European structures.

The other institutions supporting the EU integration process are the following:

- The Republic's Assembly and its Commission for European Issues
- The Secretariat for Legislation
- The General Secretariat of the Government
- The Subcommittee of the WCEI for approximation of the legislation with its working groups

== Public opinion ==
Per a nationwide poll by the International Republican Institute in 2021, around 79% of the population of North Macedonia was in favour of EU accession. However, per the poll, those who think North Macedonia is closer to EU entry today than it was in 2005, when it first received candidate member status, dropped from 57% to 32% between 2018 and 2021.

According to Konrad Adenauer Foundation, public support for EU accession was 68% in 2021, and the percentage of the citizens of North Macedonia that "view the EU as the most powerful foreign actor" dropped from 44.80% in 2019 to only 9.47% in 2021.

According to the 2025 annual survey of opinion in North Macedonia, 65% of citizens have a positive attitude towards the EU (23% very positive, 42% fairly positive), while trust in the EU is 75%. It is also revealed that 70% of citizens would vote in favour of North Macedonia's membership of the EU if a referendum was held, while 70% of citizens believe that EU memebership would bring more advantages than disadvantages.

== Chronology of relations with the EU ==
Timeline
Date	Event
October 1992	The Republic of Macedonia appoints its representative in Brussels, agreeing to the use of the "former Yugoslav" before its constitutional name ("Republic of Macedonia") designation in bilateral relations.
22 December 1995	The Republic and the EU establish diplomatic relations. Negotiations commence directed at an agreement with a wide scope of co-operation in the fields of trade, financial operations and transport.
10 March 1996	Macedonia becomes a full partner in the PHARE Programme (Poland and Hungary: Assistance for Reconstruction of their Economies).
November 1997	The Transport Agreement enters into force
1 January 1998	The Cooperation Agreement enters into force.
February 1998	1st political talks on ministerial level are held in Ohrid, in accordance with the Cooperation Agreement.
11 March 1998	A Trade and Textile Agreement is signed (it remains in force until 1998 and is later replaced with a new agreement on 1 January 2000).
21 and 22 March 1998	1st meeting of a mutual Cooperation Council in Skopje.
5 March 1999	2nd meeting of the Cooperation Council in Brussels
24 January 2000	The European Commission adopts directives regarding co-operation and regarding the official start of negotiations for potential membership.
March 2000	Opening of the EU Delegation in Skopje; appointment of the first Chief of the Delegation.
5 April 2000	Start of 1st round of negotiations on the SAA.
June 2000	Adoption of a Perspective (regulation) on Potential Membership by the European Council in Fiera.
24 November 2000	The SAA is initiated at the Zagreb Summit.
December 2000	Entering into force of Council Regulation on Introducing Exceptional Trade Measures; Macedonia joins the Regional CARDS Programme 2002–2006.
16 February 2001	Interim Agreement on SAA Trade Provisions signed.
9 April 2001	SAA and Interim Agreement on Trade and Trade Issues signed. The Agreement enters into force on 1 June 2001.
January 2002	Supplementary Protocol on Wine and Spirits, and Textile Products Trade Agreement.
20 February 2003	The President of the European Commission, Romano Prodi, visits Skopje, reconfirming the EU position on the country's perspective for EU membership.
25 July 2003	Last of 6 meetings of the Cooperation Council in Brussels.
February 2004	"Declaration on the Application for EU membership" signed by the Macedonian parliament.
22 March 2004	At a ceremony in Dublin, Ireland, the Macedonian government submitted the application for membership in the EU.
1 April 2004	SAA enters into force following the ratifications by all the EU Member States. Status of SAA ratification: Event / North Macedonia / Croatia / Albania / Montenegro (Note: Montenegro started negotiations in November 2005 while a part of Serbia and Montenegro. Separate technical negotiations were conducted regarding issues of sub-state organizational competency. A mandate for direct negotiations with Montenegro was established in July 2006. Direct negotiations were initiated on 26 September 2006 and concluded on 1 December 2006.) / Bosnia and Herzegovina / Serbia (Note: Serbia started negotiations in November 2005 while part of Serbia and Montenegro, with a modified mandate from July 2006.) / Kosovo (Note: Kosovo declared independence from Serbia in 2008 but is still claimed by Serbia as part of its territory. The European Union remains divided, with five EU member states not recognizing its independence. The EU launched a Stabilisation Tracking Mechanism for Kosovo on 6 November 2002 with the aim of aligning its policy with EU standards. On 10 October 2012 the European Commission found that there were no legal obstacles to Kosovo signing a SAA with the EU, as independence is not required for such an agreement.); SAA negotiations start / 2000-04-05 / 2000-11-24 / 2003-01-31 / 2005-10-10 / 2005-11-25 / 2005-10-10 / 2013-10-28; SAA initialled / 2000-11-24 / 2001-05-14 / 2006-02-28 / 2007-03-15 / 2007-12-04 / 2007-11-07 / 2014-07-25; SAA/IA signature / 2001-04-09 / 2001-10-29 / 2006-06-12 / 2007-10-15 / 2008-06-16 / 2008-04-29 / 2015-10-27; Interim Agreement: EC ratification / 2001-04-27 / 2002-01-30 / 2006-06-12 / 2007-10-15 / 2008-06-16 / 2009-12-08 / N/A (Note: No Interim Agreement associated with Kosovo's SAA was concluded.); SAP state ratification / 2001-04-27 / 2002-01-30 / 2006-10-09 / 2007-11-14 / 2008-06-20 / 2008-09-22 / N/A; entry into force / 2001-06-01 / 2002-03-01 / 2006-12-01 / 2008-01-01 / 2008-07-01 / 2010-02-01 / N/A; Deposit of the instrument of ratification: SAP state / 2001-04-27 / 2002-01-30 / 2006-11-09 / 2007-11-13 / 2009-02-26 / 2008-09-22 / 2016-02-26; Austria / 2002-09-06 / 2002-03-15 / 2008-05-21 / 2008-07-04 / 2009-09-04 / 2011-01-13 / N/A; Belgium / 2003-12-29 / 2003-12-17 / 2008-10-22 / 2010-03-29 / 2010-03-29 / 2012-03-20 / N/A; Bulgaria / joined the EU later / / / 2008-05-30 / 2009-03-13 / 2010-08-12 / N/A; Croatia / joined the EU later / / / / / / N/A; Cyprus / joined the EU later / / 2008-05-30 / 2008-11-20 / 2009-07-02 / 2010-11-26 / N/A; Czech Republic / joined the EU later / / 2008-05-07 / 2009-02-19 / 2009-07-23 / 2011-01-28 / N/A; Denmark / 2002-04-10 / 2002-05-08 / 2008-04-24 / 2008-06-25 / 2009-05-26 / 2011-03-04 / N/A; Estonia / joined the EU later / / 2007-10-17 / 2007-11-22 / 2008-09-11 / 2010-08-19 / N/A; Finland / 2004-01-06 / 2004-01-06 / 2007-11-29 / 2009-03-18 / 2009-04-07 / 2011-10-21 / N/A; France / 2003-06-04 / 2003-06-04 / 2009-02-12 / 2009-07-30 / 2011-02-10 / 2012-01-16 / N/A; Germany / 2002-06-20 / 2002-10-18 / 2009-02-19 / 2009-11-16 / 2009-08-14 / 2012-02-24 / N/A; Greece / 2003-08-27 / 2003-08-27 / 2009-02-26 / 2010-03-04 / 2010-09-20 / 2011-03-10 / N/A; Hungary / joined the EU later / / 2007-04-23 / 2008-05-14 / 2008-10-22 / 2010-11-16 / N/A; Ireland / 2002-05-06 / 2002-05-06 / 2007-06-11 / 2009-06-04 / 2009-06-04 / 2011-09-29 / N/A; Italy / 2003-10-30 / 2004-10-06 / 2008-01-07 / 2009-10-13 / 2010-09-08 / 2011-01-06 / N/A; Latvia / joined the EU later / / 2006-12-19 / 2008-10-17 / 2009-11-12 / 2011-05-30 / N/A; Lithuania / joined the EU later / / 2007-05-17 / 2009-03-04 / 2009-05-04 / 2013-06-26 / N/A; Luxembourg / 2003-07-28 / 2003-08-01 / 2007-07-04 / 2009-06-11 / 2010-12-22 / 2011-01-21 / N/A; Malta / joined the EU later / / 2008-04-21 / 2008-12-11 / 2010-01-07 / 2010-07-06 / N/A; Netherlands / 2002-09-09 / 2004-04-30 / 2007-12-10 / 2009-01-29 / 2009-09-30 / 2012-02-27 / N/A; Poland / joined the EU later / / 2007-04-14 / 2009-02-06 / 2010-04-07 / 2012-01-13 / N/A; Portugal / 2003-07-14 / 2003-07-14 / 2008-07-11 / 2008-09-23 / 2009-06-29 / 2011-03-04 / N/A; Romania / joined the EU later / / / 2009-01-15 / 2010-01-08 / 2012-05-22 / N/A; Slovakia / joined the EU later / / 2007-07-20 / 2008-07-29 / 2009-03-17 / 2010-11-11 / N/A; Slovenia / joined the EU later / / 2007-01-18 / 2008-02-07 / 2009-03-10 / 2010-12-07 / N/A; Spain / 2002-10-04 / 2002-10-04 / 2007-05-03 / 2009-03-12 / 2010-06-15 / 2010-06-21 / N/A; Sweden / 2002-06-25 / 2003-03-27 / 2007-03-21 / 2009-03-11 / 2009-09-14 / 2011-04-15 / N/A; United Kingdom / 2002-12-17 / 2004-09-03 / 2007-10-16 / 2010-01-12 / 2010-04-20 / 2011-08-11 / N/A; European Communities or European Union and Euratom / 2004-02-25 / 2004-12-21 / 2009-02-26 / 2010-03-29 / 2015-04-30 / 2013-07-22 / 2016-02-24 (Note: Kosovo's SAA was the first signed after the entry into force of the Lisbon treaty, which conferred a legal personality to the EU. As a result, unlike previous SAAs Kosovo's is exclusively between it and the EU and Euratom, and the member states are not parties independently.); SAA entry into force / 2004-04-01 / 2005-02-01 / 2009-04-01 / 2010-05-01 / 2015-06-01 / 2013-09-01 / 2016-04-01; EU membership (SAA lapsed) / (TBD) / 2013-07-01 / (TBD) / (TBD) / (TBD) / (TBD) / (TBD); N/A: Not applicable.
3 June 2004	1st meeting of the Stabilisation and Association Committee held in Skopje.
6 September 2004	National Strategy for European Integration adopted by the Macedonian government.
14 September 2004	1st meeting of the Stabilisation and Association Council in Brussels.
1 October 2004	Questionnaire on accession preparation submitted to the Macedonian government by the European Commission.
31 January 2005	Answers to the Questionnaire finalised by the Macedonian government.
14 February 2005	Answers to the Questionnaire submitted to the European Commission by a Macedonian delegation in Brussels.
10 May 2005	Additional questions to the Questionnaire of the European Commission that were received on 22 April 2005 are answered, accepted by the Republic's government, and sent to Brussels.
9 November 2005	Positive recommendation on Macedonian accession issued by the European Commission.
17 December 2005	The European Council in Brussels approves the candidate status.
9 November 2006	The European Commission decides to start visa facilitation negotiations with the Republic.
23 June 2008	Following the EU summit, the resolution of the naming dispute was added as a precondition to EU accession.
14 October 2009	The European Commission recommended the start of the accession negotiations for full-fledged membership of the Republic of Macedonia.
29 March 2012	European Commission launches a High Level Accession Dialogue with Skopje.
25 January 2019	The Prespa Agreement enters into force on 25 January 2019, ending the decades long naming-dispute. It is outlined in the agreement that Greece will no longer veto the accession talks between North Macedonia and the European Union. Main article: Prespa agreement
26 March 2020	The European Council formally approved start of accession talks.
19 July 2022	Accession negotiations started.

=== Visa liberalisation process ===
On 1 January 2008 the visa facilitation and readmission agreements between Macedonia and the EU entered into force. Macedonia began a visa liberalisation dialogue with the EU in February 2008 and was added to the list of visa exempt nationals on 19 December 2009, allowing their citizens to enter the Schengen Area and Cyprus without a visa when travelling with biometric passports.

=== Security and Defence Partnership between the EU and North Macedonia ===
On 19 November 2024, the European Union and North Macedonia signed a Security and Defence Partnership.

== Negotiation progress ==
No chapters have been opened since screening was completed in December 2023.

Screening and Chapter Dates
Progression	33 / 33 100% complete	33 / 33 100% complete	0 / 33 0% complete	0 / 33 0% complete
Acquis chapter	Screening Started	Screening Completed	Chapter Opened	Chapter Closed
1. Free Movement of Goods	2023-01-30	2023-03-09	–	–
2. Freedom of Movement For Workers	2023-01-30	2023-03-09	–	–
3. Right of Establishment & Freedom To Provide Services	2023-01-17	2023-03-09	–	–
4. Free Movement of Capital	2022-10-07	2023-03-09	–	–
5. Public Procurement	2022-09-15	2023-01-16	–	–
6. Company Law	2023-02-03	2023-03-09	–	–
7. Intellectual Property Law	2023-01-17	2023-03-09	–	–
8. Competition Policy	2023-01-17	2023-03-09	–	–
9. Financial Services	2022-10-07	2023-03-09	–	–
10. Information Society & Media	2023-03-27	2023-06-15	–	–
11. Agriculture & Rural Development	2023-07-17	2023-12-01	–	–
12. Food Safety, Veterinary & Phytosanitary Policy	2023-07-17	2023-12-01	–	–
13. Fisheries	2023-07-17	2023-12-01	–	–
14. Transport Policy	2023-03-15	2023-09-15	–	–
15. Energy	2023-03-15	2023-09-15	–	–
16. Taxation	2023-03-31	2023-06-15	–	–
17. Economic & Monetary Policy	2023-06-13	2023-06-15	–	–
18. Statistics	2022-09-19	2023-01-16	–	–
19. Social Policy & Employment	2023-05-23	2023-06-15	–	–
20. Enterprise & Industrial Policy	2023-05-26	2023-06-15	–	–
21. Trans-European Networks	2023-03-15	2023-09-15	–	–
22. Regional Policy & Coordination of Structural Instruments	2023-07-17	2023-12-01	–	–
23. Judiciary & Fundamental Rights	2022-09-27	2023-01-16	–	–
24. Justice, Freedom & Security	2022-09-27	2023-01-16	–	–
25. Science & Research	2023-04-28	2023-06-15	–	–
26. Education & Culture	2023-04-27	2023-06-15	–	–
27. Environment & Climate Change	2023-03-18	2023-09-15	–	–
28. Consumer & Health Protection	2023-02-17	2023-03-09	–	–
29. Customs Union	2022-10-20	2023-06-15	–	–
30. External Relations	2023-12-06	2023-12-06	–	–
31. Foreign, Security & Defence Policy	2023-12-07	2023-12-07	–	–
32. Financial Control	2022-12-09	2023-01-16	–	–
33. Financial & Budgetary Provisions	2023-07-17	2023-12-01	–	–
34. Institutions	N/A	N/A	N/A	N/A
35. Other Issues	N/A	N/A	N/A	N/A
Please note as of 2021, clusters have been implemented to provide better organisation and some additional items have been added to align with the new EU methodology.
Clusters	Acquis Chapter	State of Play	Cluster Opened	Cluster Closed
Overview	Overview	0 out of 33	0 out of 6	0 out of 6
Fundamentals	23. Judiciary & Fundamental Rights	–	–	–
Fundamentals	24. Justice, Freedom & Security	–	–	–
Fundamentals	Economic criteria	–	–	–
Fundamentals	Functioning of democratic institutions	–	–	–
Fundamentals	Public administration reform	–	–	–
Fundamentals	5. Public Procurement	–	–	–
Fundamentals	18. Statistics	–	–	–
Fundamentals	32. Financial Control	–	–	–
Internal Market	1. Free Movement of Goods	–	–	–
Internal Market	2. Freedom of Movement For Workers	–	–	–
Internal Market	3. Right of Establishment & Freedom To Provide Services	–	–	–
Internal Market	4. Free Movement of Capital	–	–	–
Internal Market	6. Company Law	–	–	–
Internal Market	7. Intellectual Property Law	–	–	–
Internal Market	8. Competition Policy	–	–	–
Internal Market	9. Financial Services	–	–	–
Internal Market	28. Consumer & Health Protection	–	–	–
Competitiveness and inclusive growth	10. Information Society & Media	–	–	–
Competitiveness and inclusive growth	16. Taxation	–	–	–
Competitiveness and inclusive growth	17. Economic & Monetary Policy	–	–	–
Competitiveness and inclusive growth	19. Social Policy & Employment	–	–	–
Competitiveness and inclusive growth	20. Enterprise & Industrial Policy	–	–	–
Competitiveness and inclusive growth	25. Science & Research	–	–	–
Competitiveness and inclusive growth	26. Education & Culture	–	–	–
Competitiveness and inclusive growth	29. Customs Union	–	–	–
Green agenda and sustainable connectivity	14. Transport Policy	–	–	–
Green agenda and sustainable connectivity	15. Energy	–	–	–
Green agenda and sustainable connectivity	21. Trans-European Networks	–	–	–
Green agenda and sustainable connectivity	27. Environment	–	–	–
Resources, agriculture and cohesion	11. Agriculture & Rural Development	–	–	–
Resources, agriculture and cohesion	12. Food Safety, Veterinary & Phytosanitary Policy	–	–	–
Resources, agriculture and cohesion	13. Fisheries	–	–	–
Resources, agriculture and cohesion	22. Regional Policy & Coordination of Structural Instruments	–	–	–
Resources, agriculture and cohesion	33. Financial & Budgetary Provisions	–	–	–
External relations	30. External Relations	–	–	–
External relations	31. Foreign, Security & Defence Policy	–	–	–
	34. Institutions	–	–	–
	35. Other Issues	–	–	–

November 2026 European Commission Report
Acquis chapter	Status as of Nov 2025	Chapter Status as of August 2026
Overview	2 chapters in early stage, 1 chapter with some level of preparation, 1 chapter with some/moderate preparation, 16 chapters with a moderate level of preparation, 6 chapters with a moderate/good level of preparation, 7 chapters with a good level of preparation	33 unopened chapters
1. Free Movement of Goods	Moderately prepared	Chapter unopened
2. Freedom of Movement For Workers	Early stage	Chapter unopened
3. Right of Establishment & Freedom To Provide Services	Moderately prepared	Chapter unopened
4. Free Movement of Capital	Moderate / Good	Chapter unopened
5. Public Procurement	Moderately prepared	Chapter unopened
6. Company Law	Good level of preparation	Chapter unopened
7. Intellectual Property Law	Moderately prepared	Chapter unopened
8. Competition Policy	Moderately prepared	Chapter unopened
9. Financial Services	Moderately prepared	Chapter unopened
10. Information Society & Media	Moderate / Good	Chapter unopened
11. Agriculture & Rural Development	Moderately prepared	Chapter unopened
12. Food Safety, Veterinary & Phytosanitary Policy	Good level of preparation	Chapter unopened
13. Fisheries	Moderately prepared	Chapter unopened
14. Transport Policy	Moderately prepared	Chapter unopened
15. Energy	Moderately prepared	Chapter unopened
16. Taxation	Moderately prepared	Chapter unopened
17. Economic & Monetary Policy	Moderate / Good	Chapter unopened
18. Statistics	Moderate / Good	Chapter unopened
19. Social Policy & Employment	Moderately prepared	Chapter unopened
20. Enterprise & Industrial Policy	Moderate / Good	Chapter unopened
21. Trans-European Networks	Good level of preparation	Chapter unopened
22. Regional Policy & Coordination of Structural Instruments	Moderately prepared	Chapter unopened
23. Judiciary & Fundamental Rights	Some / Moderate	Chapter unopened
24. Justice, Freedom & Security	Moderately prepared	Chapter unopened
25. Science & Research	Good level of preparation	Chapter unopened
26. Education & Culture	Moderate / Good	Chapter unopened
27. Environment & Climate Change	Some level of preparation	Chapter unopened
28. Consumer & Health Protection	Moderately prepared	Chapter unopened
29. Customs Union	Good level of preparation	Chapter unopened
30. External Relations	Good level of preparation	Chapter unopened
31. Foreign, Security & Defence Policy	Good level of preparation	Chapter unopened
32. Financial Control	Moderately prepared	Chapter unopened
33. Financial & Budgetary Provisions	Early stage	Chapter unopened
34. Institutions	Nothing to adopt	Nothing to adopt
35. Other Issues	Nothing to adopt	Nothing to adopt
Legend: Well advanced Good / Well advanced Good level of preparation Moderate / Good Moderately prepared Some / Moderate Some level of preparation Early stage / Some Early stage

Report history
Clusters	Acquis Chapter	December 2011	October 2012	October 2013	October 2014	October 2015	November 2016	April 2018	May 2019	October 2020	October 2021	October 2022	November 2023	October 2024	November 2025	November 2026
1. Fundamentals	Public administration reform	-	-	-	-	Moderately prepared	Moderately prepared	Moderately prepared	Moderately prepared	Moderately prepared	Moderately prepared	Moderately prepared	Moderately prepared	Moderately prepared	Moderately prepared	Moderately prepared
1. Fundamentals	23. Judiciary & Fundamental Rights	Considerable efforts needed	Further efforts needed	Further efforts needed	Further efforts needed	Some level of preparation	Some level of preparation	Some level of preparation	Some / Moderate	Some / Moderate	Some / Moderate	Some / Moderate	Some / Moderate	Some / Moderate	Some / Moderate	Some / Moderate
1. Fundamentals	24. Justice, Freedom & Security	Further efforts needed	Moderately prepared	Moderately prepared	Further efforts needed	Moderately prepared	Moderately prepared	Moderately prepared	Some / Moderate	Some / Moderate	Moderately prepared	Moderately prepared	Moderately prepared	Moderately prepared	Moderately prepared	Moderately prepared
1. Fundamentals	Economic criteria	-	-	-	-	Good level of preparation	Good level of preparation	Good level of preparation	Good level of preparation	Good level of preparation	Good level of preparation	Good level of preparation	Good level of preparation	Good level of preparation	Good level of preparation	Good level of preparation
1. Fundamentals	5. Public Procurement	Well advanced	Moderately prepared	Moderately prepared	Moderately prepared	Moderately prepared	Moderately prepared	Moderately prepared	Moderately prepared	Moderately prepared	Moderately prepared	Moderately prepared	Moderately prepared	Moderately prepared	Moderately prepared	Moderately prepared
1. Fundamentals	18. Statistics	Moderately prepared	Moderately prepared	Moderately prepared	Moderately prepared	Moderately prepared	Moderately prepared	Moderately prepared	Moderately prepared	Moderately prepared	Moderately prepared	Moderately prepared	Moderately prepared	Moderate / Good	Moderate / Good	Moderate / Good
1. Fundamentals	32. Financial Control	Further efforts needed	Early stage	Early stage	Moderately prepared	Moderately prepared	Moderately prepared	Moderately prepared	Moderately prepared	Moderately prepared	Moderately prepared	Moderately prepared	Moderately prepared	Moderately prepared	Moderately prepared	Moderately prepared
2. Internal Market	1. Free Movement of Goods	Moderately prepared	Moderately prepared	Moderately prepared	Moderately prepared	Moderately prepared	Moderately prepared	Moderately prepared	Moderately prepared	Moderately prepared	Moderately prepared	Moderately prepared	Moderately prepared	Moderately prepared	Moderately prepared	Moderately prepared
2. Internal Market	2. Freedom of Movement For Workers	Early stage	Early stage	Early stage	Early stage	Early stage	Early stage	Early stage	Early stage	Early stage	Early stage	Early stage	Early stage	Early stage	Early stage	Early stage
2. Internal Market	3. Right of Establishment & Freedom To Provide Services	Early stage	Moderately prepared	Further efforts needed	Moderately prepared	Moderately prepared	Moderately prepared	Moderately prepared	Moderately prepared	Moderately prepared	Moderately prepared	Moderately prepared	Moderately prepared	Moderately prepared	Moderately prepared	Moderately prepared
2. Internal Market	4. Free Movement of Capital	Further efforts needed	Moderately prepared	Moderately prepared	Moderately prepared	Moderately prepared	Moderately prepared	Moderately prepared	Moderately prepared	Moderately prepared	Moderately prepared	Moderately prepared	Moderately prepared	Moderately prepared	Moderate / Good	Moderate / Good
2. Internal Market	6. Company Law	Considerable efforts needed	Moderately prepared	Moderately prepared	Moderately prepared	Good level of preparation	Good level of preparation	Good level of preparation	Good level of preparation	Good level of preparation	Good level of preparation	Good level of preparation	Good level of preparation	Good level of preparation	Good level of preparation	Good level of preparation
2. Internal Market	7. Intellectual Property Law	Further efforts needed	Moderately prepared	Moderately prepared	Moderately prepared	Moderately prepared	Moderately prepared	Moderately prepared	Moderately prepared	Moderately prepared	Moderately prepared	Moderately prepared	Moderately prepared	Moderately prepared	Moderately prepared	Moderately prepared
2. Internal Market	8. Competition Policy	Moderately prepared	Moderately prepared	Moderately prepared	Moderately prepared	Moderately prepared	Moderately prepared	Moderately prepared	Moderately prepared	Moderately prepared	Moderately prepared	Moderately prepared	Moderately prepared	Moderately prepared	Moderately prepared	Moderately prepared
2. Internal Market	9. Financial Services	Further efforts needed	Moderately prepared	Moderately prepared	Moderately prepared	Moderately prepared	Moderately prepared	Moderately prepared	Moderately prepared	Moderately prepared	Moderately prepared	Moderately prepared	Moderately prepared	Moderately prepared	Moderately prepared	Moderately prepared
2. Internal Market	28. Consumer & Health Protection	Moderately prepared	Moderately prepared	Moderately prepared	Moderately prepared	Moderately prepared	Moderately prepared	Moderately prepared	Moderately prepared	Moderately prepared	Moderately prepared	Moderately prepared	Moderately prepared	Moderately prepared	Moderately prepared	Moderately prepared
3. Competitiveness; and inclusive growth	10. Information Society & Media	Further efforts needed	Moderately prepared	Moderately prepared	Moderately prepared	Good level of preparation	Good level of preparation	Moderately prepared	Moderately prepared	Moderately prepared	Moderately prepared	Moderately prepared	Moderately prepared	Moderately prepared	Moderately prepared	Moderate / Good
3. Competitiveness; and inclusive growth	16. Taxation	Further efforts needed	Moderately prepared	Moderately prepared	Moderately prepared	Moderately prepared	Moderately prepared	Moderately prepared	Moderately prepared	Moderately prepared	Moderately prepared	Moderately prepared	Moderately prepared	Moderately prepared	Moderately prepared	Moderately prepared
3. Competitiveness; and inclusive growth	17. Economic & Monetary Policy	Moderately prepared	Moderately prepared	Moderately prepared	Moderately prepared	Moderately prepared	Moderately prepared	Moderately prepared	Moderately prepared	Moderately prepared	Moderately prepared	Moderately prepared	Moderate / Good	Moderate / Good	Moderate / Good	Moderate / Good
3. Competitiveness; and inclusive growth	19. Social Policy & Employment	Considerable efforts needed	Considerable efforts needed	Early stage	Moderately prepared	Moderately prepared	Moderately prepared	Moderately prepared	Moderately prepared	Moderately prepared	Moderately prepared	Moderately prepared	Moderately prepared	Moderately prepared	Moderately prepared	Moderately prepared
3. Competitiveness; and inclusive growth	20. Enterprise & Industrial Policy	Some level of preparation	Considerable efforts needed	Moderately prepared	Moderately prepared	Moderately prepared	Moderately prepared	Moderately prepared	Moderately prepared	Moderately prepared	Moderately prepared	Moderately prepared	Moderately prepared	Moderate / Good	Moderate / Good	Moderate / Good
3. Competitiveness; and inclusive growth	25. Science & Research	Considerable efforts needed	Further efforts needed	Moderately prepared	Moderately prepared	Good level of preparation	Good level of preparation	Good level of preparation	Good level of preparation	Good level of preparation	Good level of preparation	Good level of preparation	Good level of preparation	Good level of preparation	Good level of preparation	Good level of preparation
3. Competitiveness; and inclusive growth	26. Education & Culture	Moderately prepared	Moderately prepared	Moderately prepared	Moderately prepared	Moderately prepared	Moderately prepared	Moderately prepared	Moderately prepared	Moderately prepared	Moderately prepared	Moderately prepared	Moderately prepared	Moderately prepared	Moderately prepared	Moderate / Good
3. Competitiveness; and inclusive growth	29. Customs Union	No major difficulties expected	Moderately prepared	Moderately prepared	Moderately prepared	Good level of preparation	Good level of preparation	Good level of preparation	Good level of preparation	Good level of preparation	Good level of preparation	Good level of preparation	Good level of preparation	Good level of preparation	Good level of preparation	Good level of preparation
4. Green agenda; and sustainable connectivity	14. Transport Policy	Moderately prepared	Moderately prepared	Moderately prepared	Moderately prepared	Moderately prepared	Moderately prepared	Moderately prepared	Moderately prepared	Moderately prepared	Moderately prepared	Moderately prepared	Moderately prepared	Moderately prepared	Moderately prepared	Moderately prepared
4. Green agenda; and sustainable connectivity	15. Energy	Moderately prepared	Moderately prepared	Moderately prepared	Moderately prepared	Moderately prepared	Moderately prepared	Moderately prepared	Moderately prepared	Moderately prepared	Moderately prepared	Moderately prepared	Moderately prepared	Moderately prepared	Moderately prepared	Moderately prepared
4. Green agenda; and sustainable connectivity	21. Trans-European Networks	Moderately prepared	Moderately prepared	Moderately prepared	Moderately prepared	Good level of preparation	Good level of preparation	Good level of preparation	Good level of preparation	Good level of preparation	Good level of preparation	Good level of preparation	Good level of preparation	Good level of preparation	Good level of preparation	Good level of preparation
4. Green agenda; and sustainable connectivity	27. Environment	Considerable efforts needed	Further efforts needed	Further efforts needed	Further efforts needed	Moderately prepared	Some level of preparation	Some level of preparation	Some level of preparation	Some level of preparation	Some level of preparation	Some level of preparation	Some level of preparation	Some level of preparation	Some level of preparation	Some level of preparation
5. Resources, agriculture; and cohesion	11. Agriculture & Rural Development	Moderately prepared	Moderately prepared	Moderately prepared	Moderately prepared	Moderately prepared	Moderately prepared	Moderately prepared	Moderately prepared	Moderately prepared	Moderately prepared	Moderately prepared	Moderately prepared	Moderately prepared	Moderately prepared	Moderately prepared
5. Resources, agriculture; and cohesion	12. Food Safety, Veterinary & Phytosanitary Policy	Good level of preparation	Early stage	Early stage	Early stage	Some level of preparation	Some level of preparation	Good level of preparation	Good level of preparation	Good level of preparation	Good level of preparation	Good level of preparation	Good level of preparation	Good level of preparation	Good level of preparation	Good level of preparation
5. Resources, agriculture; and cohesion	13. Fisheries	Moderately prepared	Further efforts needed	Further efforts needed	Further efforts needed	Moderately prepared	Moderately prepared	Moderately prepared	Moderately prepared	Moderately prepared	Moderately prepared	Moderately prepared	Moderately prepared	Moderately prepared	Moderately prepared	Moderately prepared
5. Resources, agriculture; and cohesion	22. Regional Policy & Coordination of Structural Instruments	Moderately prepared	Moderately prepared	Moderately prepared	Some level of preparation	Moderately prepared	Moderately prepared	Moderately prepared	Moderately prepared	Moderately prepared	Moderately prepared	Moderately prepared	Moderately prepared	Moderately prepared	Moderately prepared	Moderately prepared
5. Resources, agriculture; and cohesion	33. Financial & Budgetary Provisions	Totally incompatible with acquis	Early stage	Early stage	Early stage	Early stage	Early stage	Early stage	Early stage	Early stage	Early stage	Early stage	Early stage	Early stage	Early stage	Early stage
6. External relations	30. External Relations	Some level of preparation	Moderately prepared	Moderately prepared	Moderately prepared	Moderately prepared	Moderately prepared	Moderately prepared	Moderately prepared	Moderately prepared	Moderately prepared	Moderately prepared	Moderately prepared	Good level of preparation	Good level of preparation	Good level of preparation
6. External relations	31. Foreign, Security & Defence Policy	Moderately prepared	Moderately prepared	Moderately prepared	Moderately prepared	Moderately prepared	Moderately prepared	Moderately prepared	Moderately prepared	Moderately prepared	Moderately prepared	Good level of preparation	Good level of preparation	Good level of preparation	Good level of preparation	Good level of preparation
	34. Institutions	N/A	N/A	N/A	N/A	N/A	N/A	N/A	N/A	N/A	N/A	N/A	N/A	N/A	N/A	N/A
	35. Other Issues	N/A	N/A	N/A	N/A	N/A	N/A	N/A	N/A	N/A	N/A	N/A	N/A	N/A	N/A	N/A
Legend: Well advanced Good / Well advanced Good level of preparation Moderate / Good Moderately prepared Some / Moderate Some level of preparation Early stage / Some Early stage Legacy evaluations: No major difficulties expected Further efforts needed Considerable efforts needed Totally incompatible with acquis

== Impact of joining ==
Member countries	Population	Area (km^{2})	GDP (billion US$)	GDP per capita (US$)	Languages	Scripts
North Macedonia	1,836,713	25,713	12.383	6,143	Macedonian	Cyrillic
EU27	447,007,596	4,233,262	17,046	38,957	24	3
EU27+1	448,844,309 (+0.45%)	4,258,975 (+0.61%)	17,277.98 (+0.06%)	38,134 (–0.2%)	25 (+1)	3

== North Macedonia's foreign relations with EU member states ==
- Austria
- Belgium
- Bulgaria
- Croatia
- Cyprus
- Czech Republic
- Denmark
- Estonia
- Finland
- France
- Germany
- Greece
- Hungary
- (Republic of Ireland) Ireland
- Italy
- Latvia
- Lithuania
- Luxembourg
- Malta
- Netherlands
- Poland
- Portugal
- Romania
- Slovakia
- Slovenia
- Spain
- Sweden

== See also ==
- Foreign relations of North Macedonia
- Foreign relations of the European Union
- Accession of Albania to the European Union
- Accession of Kosovo to the European Union
- Accession of Serbia to the European Union
- North Macedonia–NATO relations
- Yugoslavia–European Communities relations
- Potential enlargement of the European Union
- Bulgaria–North Macedonia relations
- Greece–North Macedonia relations
