= Czech Republic–North Macedonia relations =

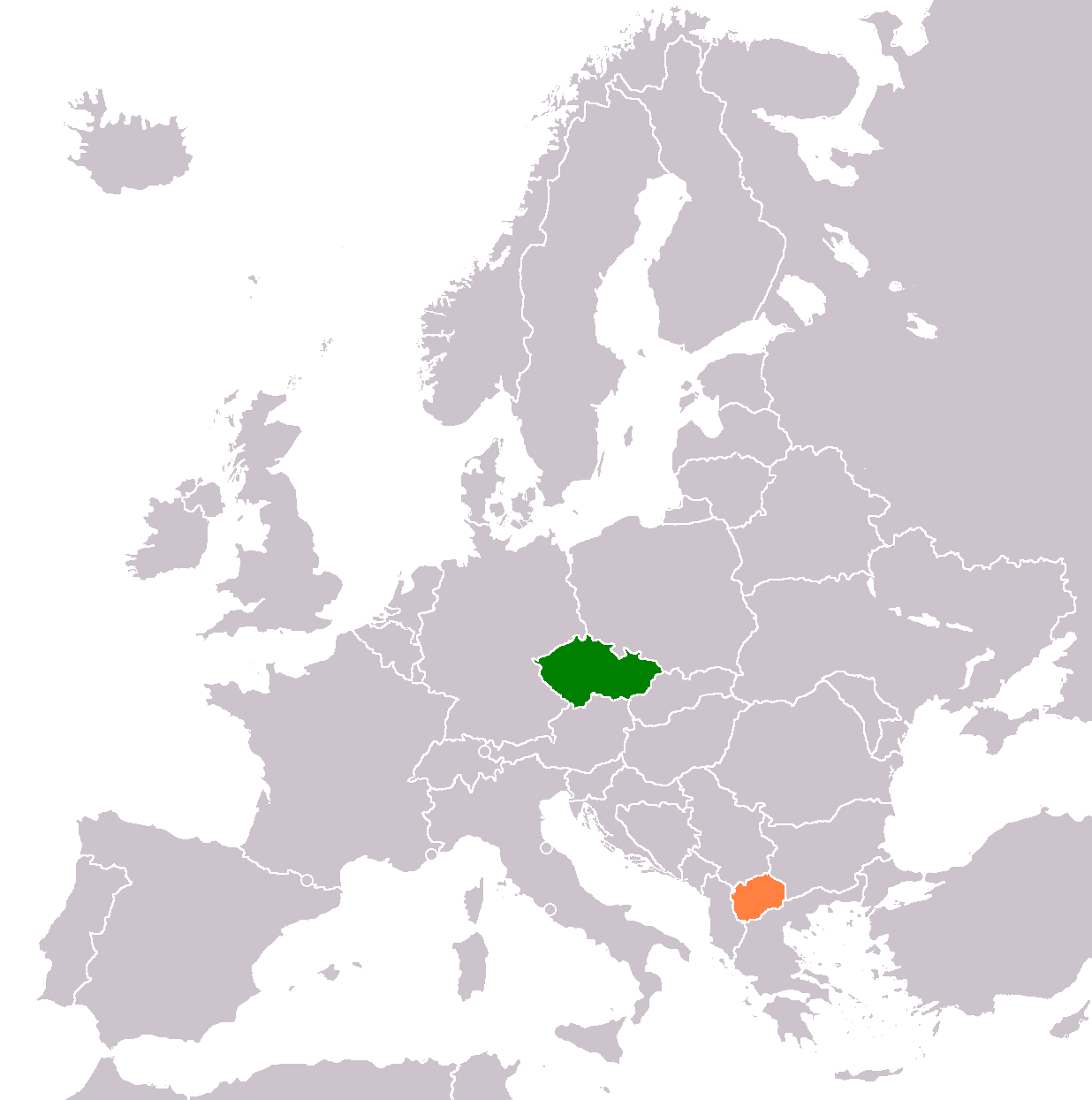

- Czech Republic: North Macedonia

Czech Republic–North Macedonia relations refers to the bilateral political relations between the Czech Republic and the Republic of North Macedonia. Both countries are members of the Council of Europe, and NATO. Also Czech Republic is an EU member and North Macedonia is an EU candidate.

Bilateral relations are excellent and besides the fact that North Macedonia became an independent country only in 1991, Czech Republic–North Macedonia relations have a long tradition. The Czech Republic fully supports North Macedonia's accession to the EU.

== Historical relations ==
Before 1991, much of the relations occurred in the context between Yugoslavia and Czechoslovakia.

Between the two world wars, from 1924 to 1938, the Czechoslovak Republic had a consulate in Skopje, which in that period was (as was the whole of today's North Macedonia) a part of the Kingdom of Yugoslavia.

The Czechoslovak consul in Skopje in 1928, Vladimír Znojemský, underlined in his reports the existence of a Macedonian nation in the region of Macedonia, which is "different from what the others are, whose people speak a different language and feel different".

In the period between 1918 and World War II Czechoslovakia supported the several Macedonian initiatives on recognition of the Macedonian nation. At that time, the Macedonian nation was not recognized by the authorities of the Kingdom of Yugoslavia. Instead, the Macedonians were regarded as (Southern) Serbs.

In 1968, when the Warsaw Pact invaded Czechoslovakia, the Socialist Republic of Macedonia (at that time a republic within the Socialist Federal Republic of Yugoslavia) supported Czechoslovakia. A lot of manifestations were held there in order to support Czechoslovakia and to protest against what was happening.

== Relations since 1991 ==
The Czech Republic offers continuous support to North Macedonia considering the country's accession to the European Union, which is among the top strategic priorities of North Macedonia.

The cooperation in the field of economy between North Macedonia and the Czech Republic is good and improving. The level of trade exchange between the two countries shows a positive trend. Many companies from the Czech Republic have so far invested in North Macedonia.

Other spheres of good cooperation between the two states are tourism and education.

The Czech Republic is also a country that recognized North Macedonia under its former constitutional name Republic of Macedonia, before the Prespa Agreement. The Czech Republic therefore was one of 131 states in total, which had recognized North Macedonia by its former constitutional name.

During 2015 European migrant crisis Czech government supported Macedonian border protection and sent auxiliary Czech Police troops to the country. This was also subsequently stressed by President Miloš Zeman's visit in Skopje in June 2016.

== Diplomatic representations ==
The embassy of the Czech Republic in Macedonia was opened in September 2006 and is located in Skopje. North Macedonia's embassy in the Czech Republic, which was opened in January 2008, is in the capital Prague.

== See also ==
- Foreign relations of the Czech Republic
- Foreign relations of North Macedonia
- Accession of North Macedonia to the EU
- NATO-EU relations
- Macedonians in the Czech Republic
