= Macedonians in the Czech Republic =

Macedonians in the Czech Republic Македонци во Чешка Makedonci v České republice
Total population
- 1,785 – 11,623

Regions with significant populations
- Prague

Languages
- Primarily Macedonian and Czech

Religion
- Predominantly Macedonian Orthodox

Related ethnic groups
- Macedonians

There is a small community of ethnic Macedonians in the Czech Republic. Among the refugees of the Greek Civil War who were admitted to Czechoslovakia in the late 1940s, roughly 4,000 were of Macedonian ethnicity; they resettled primarily in the Czech portion of the country. In commemoration of 75 years since the exodus of the child refugees to Czechoslovakia and Poland, an exhibition was held in Krnov in June 2023.

== Notable people ==
- Petra Cetkovská (b. 1985), a tennis player
- Marek Jankulovski (b. 1977), a football player

== See also ==
- Czech Republic–North Macedonia relations
- Macedonian diaspora
- Ethnic groups in the Czech Republic

== Sources ==
- Sloboda, Marián (2003), "Řecká a makedonská etnická skupina v Česku: lingvistické aspekty jejich vzniku a vývoje", in Nábělková, M.; Šimková, M. (eds.), Varia X: Zborník materiálov z X. kolokvia mladých jazykovedcov (PDF), Bratislava: Slovenská jazykovedná spoločnosť pri SAV, pp. 103–113, ISBN 80-89037-04-6, archived from the original (PDF) on 2023-04-08
