= Aydarovo =

Aydarovo (Russian: Айдарово) is the name of several rural localities in Russia:

- Aydarovo, Chuvash Republic, a village in Andreyevo-Bazarskoye Rural Settlement of Kozlovsky District in the Chuvash Republic
- Aydarovo, Kaluga Oblast, a village in Iznoskovsky District of Kaluga Oblast
- Aydarovo, Pskov Oblast, a village in Loknyansky District of Pskov Oblast
- Aydarovo, Tyulyachinsky District, Republic of Tatarstan, a village in Tyulyachinsky District of the Republic of Tatarstan
- Aydarovo, Zelenodolsky District, Republic of Tatarstan, a village in Zelenodolsky District of the Republic of Tatarstan
- Aydarovo, Tula Oblast, a village in Bunyrevsky Rural Okrug of Aleksinsky District in Tula Oblast
- Aydarovo, Voronezh Oblast, a selo in Aydarovskoye Rural Settlement of Ramonsky District in Voronezh Oblast
