= 1934 Bulgarian census =

The census of the population in the Kingdom of Bulgaria was held on 31 December 1934.

== Ethnic groups ==
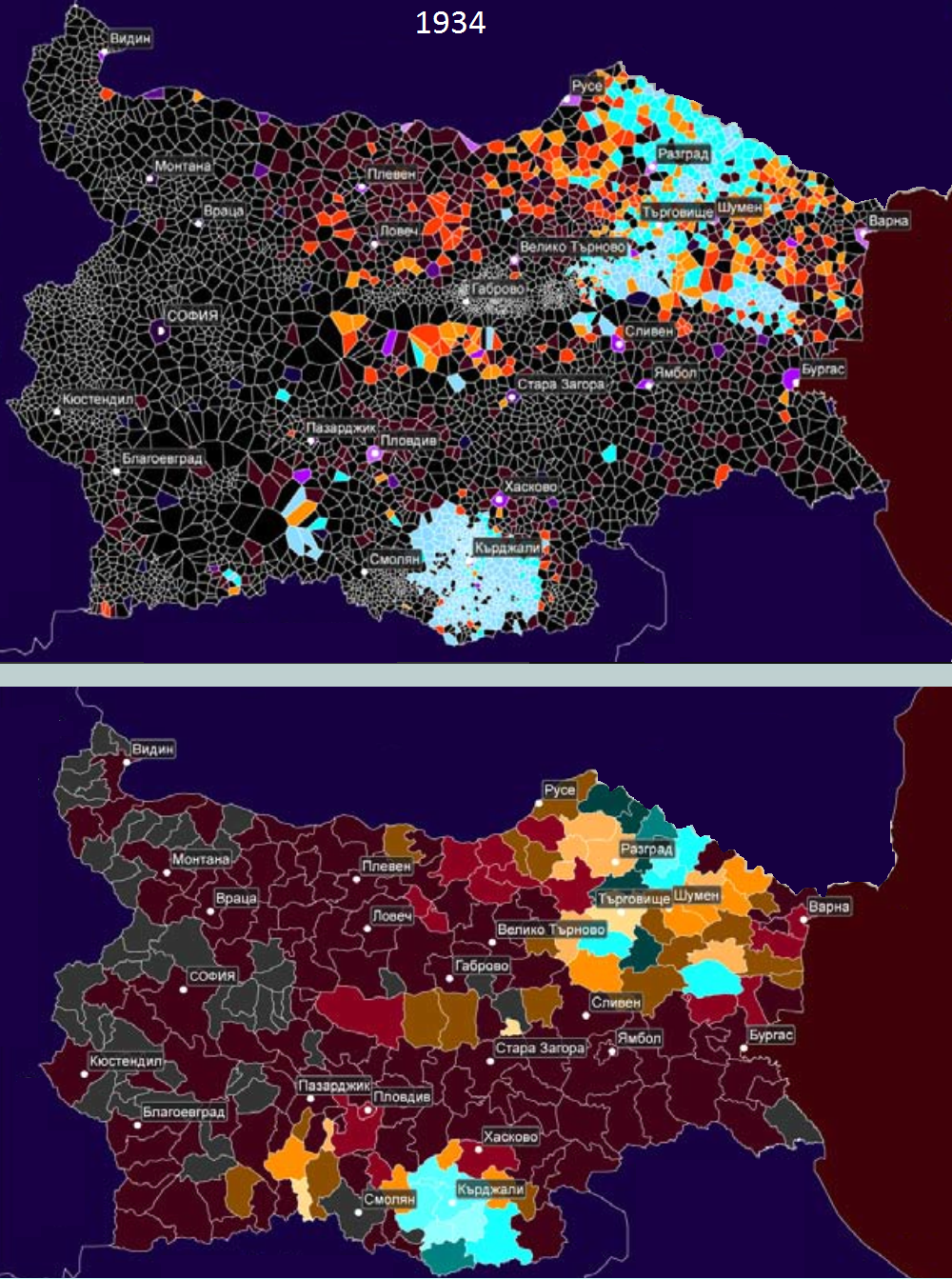
Share of Turks in town halls, compared to the territories of today's municipalities.

Number and share of ethnic groups.

Ethnicity	Numbers	%
Bulgarians	5,204,217	85.6
Turks	591,193	9.7
Roma	149,385	2.5
Jews	48,565	0.8
Armenians	25,963	0.4
Romanians	16,504	0.3
Russians	11,928	0.2
Greeks	9,601	0.2

Ethnicity (1934)
Bulgarians	85.6%
Turks	9.7%
Roma	2.5%
Jews	0.8%
Armenians	0.4%

== Religion ==
Number and share of the population by religion.

Religion	Numbers	%
Orthodox	5,128,890	84.3
Islam	821,298	13.5
Jews	48,398	0.7
Catholic	45,704	0.7
Armenian Gregorian	23,476	0.3
Protestants	8,371	0.1
Others	1,802	0.0
