= Aydarovo, Voronezh Oblast =

Aydarovo Айдарово
- Selo
- Location within Voronezh Oblast Location within Russia
- Coordinates: 51°54′N 39°17′E
- Country: Russia
- Region: Voronezh Oblast
- District: Ramonsky District
- Time zone: UTC+3:00

Aydarovo (Russian: Айдарово) is a rural locality (a selo) and the administrative center of Aydarovskoye Rural Settlement, Ramonsky District, Voronezh Oblast, Russia. The population was 939 as of 2010. There are 27 streets.

== Geography ==
Aydarovo is located 4 km west of Ramon (the district's administrative centre) by road. VNISS is the nearest rural locality.
