= United Macedonian Organization Ilinden–Pirin =

United Macedonian Organization Ilinden–Pirin Обединена македонска организация: Илинден–Пирин
- Founded: 13 October 2001; 24 years ago
- European affiliation: European Free Alliance
- National Assembly: 0 / 240
- European Parliament: 0 / 17

Party flag

United Macedonian Organisation: Ilinden–Pirin (Обединена македонска организация: Илинден–Пирин) is a Macedonian organisation in Bulgaria, whose self-declared aims are protection of the human rights, language and nationality of the Macedonian minority in the country. In Bulgaria itself the organization is regarded as a foreign government-funded separatist organization.

== History ==
In 1999, the organisation was registered as a political party and took part in the municipal elections the same year. The party polled approximately 3,000 votes in the party's core region, Blagoevgrad Province, in line with the number of self-declared ethnic Macedonians in the region according to the Bulgarian census at the time (3,100 in 2001). The party received, however, almost no votes in the rest of the country.

On February 29, 2000, by decision of the Bulgarian Constitutional Court, UMO Ilinden–Pirin was expelled from the Bulgarian political system, as a separatist party. On November 25, the European Court of Human Rights in Strasbourg, condemned Bulgaria because of violations of the OMO Ilinden–Pirin's freedom of organising meetings. The court stated that Bulgaria had violated Act 11 from the European Convention of Human Rights.

On 26 June 2006, the party held a new founding meeting in the southwestern town of Gotse Delchev despite an IMRO-BNM protest demonstration. The party's leader, Stojko Stojkov, called the party Bulgarian and not ethnically based.

According to the organization, their headquarters have been attacked and vandalized twice - once in 2007, and another time in 2008. Police refused to start an investigation, because according to them, the amount of damage done was not big enough for an investigation.

On July 30 Sofia's City Court confirmed the decision to deny registration; the arguments advanced by the court were, among others, that the necessary quorum of 530 signatures had not been reached and that there were many irregularities among those presented.

UMO Ilinden–Pirin has been accepted as a full member of the European Free Alliance in April 2007.

In April 2026, after a complaint by Stojko Stojkov, co-president of the organization, the UN Human Rights Committee concluded that Bulgaria violated the right to freedom of association when domestic courts rejected his application to register a non‑profit human rights organisation without valid legal justification. The Committee concluded that the decisions were excessively formalistic, failed to provide clear reasoning, and called on Bulgaria to review the rulings and compensate the complainant.

== See also ==
- Ethnic Macedonians in Bulgaria
