= Demographics of Macedonia =

Demographics of Macedonia may refer to:

- Demographics of North Macedonia: current demography, as reflected in the 2002 census
- Demographic history of North Macedonia: demographic history since 1948 of the former Yugoslav republic of Macedonia and current North Macedonia
- Demographic history of Macedonia: demographic history before World War II of the historical region of Macedonia, spanning several current borders
