= Demographic history of North Macedonia =

This article presents the demographic history of North Macedonia through census results since 1948.

== 1948 census ==
- TOTAL = 1,152,986
- Macedonians = 789,603 (68.5%)
- Albanians = 197,603 (17.1%)
- Turks = 95,940 (8.3%)
- Serbs = 29,721 (2.6%)
- Romani = 19,500 (1.7%)
- Aromanians = 9,511 (0.8%)
- Montenegrins = 2,348 (0.2%)
- Croats = 2,090
- Muslims = 1,560
- Others = 5,324 (0.46%)

== 1953 census ==
- TOTAL = 1,394,514
- Macedonians = 860,699 (66%)
- Albanians = 162,000 (12.4%)
- Turks = 203,928 (15.6%)
- Romani = 20,462 (1.6%)
- Serbs = 35,112 (2.7%)
- Croats = 2,771
- Montenegrins = 2,526 (0.18%)
- Muslims = 1,591
- Others = 56,981 (1.07%)

== 1961 census ==
- TOTAL = 1,406,003
- Macedonians = 900,685 (71.2%)
- Albanians = 183,108 (13%)
- Turks = 131,481 (9.4%)
- Serbs = 42,728 (2.7%)
- Romani = 20,606 (1.5%)
- Croats = 3,801
- Montenegrins = 3,414 (0.24%)
- Yugoslavs = 1,260
- Muslims = 3,002
- Slovenes = 1,147
- Others = 90,549 (1.03%)

== 1971 census ==
- TOTAL = 1,647,308
- Macedonians = 1,142,375 (69.3%)
- Albanians = 279,871 (17%)
- Turks = 108,552 (6.6%)
- Romani = 24,505 (1.5%)
- Yugoslavs = 3,652 (0.24%)
- Serbs = 46,465 (2.85%)
- Aromanians = 7,000 (0.42%)
- Croats = 3,882
- Montenegrins = 3,246 (0.19%)
- Muslims = 1,248
- Others = 34,005 (1.55%)

== 1981 census ==
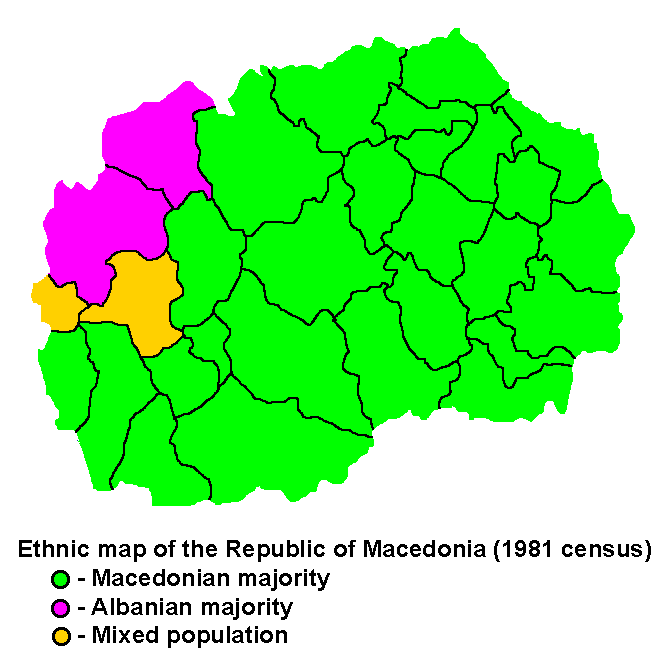
Ethnic map of North Macedonia, according to the 1981 census

- TOTAL = 1,909,146
- Macedonians = 1,279,323 (67%)
- Albanians = 377,208 (19.8%)
- Turks = 86,591 (4.5%)
- Romani = 43,125 (2.3%)
- Aromanians = 6,384 (0.3%)
- Serbs = 44,613 (2.3%)
- Muslims = 39,555 (2.2%)
- Yugoslavs = 14,240
- Croats = 3,349
- Montenegrins = 3,940 (0.21%)
- Others = 10,818 (0.56%)

== 1991 census ==
- TOTAL = 2,033,964
- Macedonians = 1,328,187 (65.3%)
- Albanians = 441,987 (21.73%)
- Turks = 77,080 (3.79%)
- Romani = 52,103 (2.56%)
- Aromanians = 7,764 (0.38%)
- Serbs = 42,755 (2.1%)
- Muslims = 31,356 (1.54%)
- Greeks = 474 (0.02%)
- Bulgarians = 1,370 (0.07%)
- Others = 50,888 (2.6%)

== 1994 census ==
- TOTAL = 1,936,877
- Macedonians = 1,288,330 (66.5%)
- Albanians = 441,104 (22.86%)
- Turks = 77,252 (4%)
- Romani = 43,732 (2.25%)
- Aromanians = 8,467(0.44%)
- Serbs = 39,620 (2.04%)
- Others = 34,960 (1.8%)

== 2002 census ==
Ethnic groups in North Macedonia, according to the 2002 census

- TOTAL = 2,022,547
- Macedonians: 1,297,981 (64.17%)
- Albanians: 509,083 (25.17%)
- Turks: 77,959 (3.85%)
- Romani: 53,879 (2.66%)
- Serbs: 35,939 (1.78%)
- Bosniaks 17,018 (0.84%)
- Aromanians: 9,695 (0.479%)
- Egyptians: 3,713 (0.184%)
- Croats: 2,686 (0.133%)
- Muslims: 2,553 (0.13%)
- Montenegrins: 2,003 (0.1%)
- Bulgarians: 1,418 (0.073%)
- Greeks: 422 (0.021%)
- Russians: 368 (0.018%)
- Slovenes: 365
- Poles: 162
- Ukrainians: 136
- Hungarians: 129
- Germans: 88
- Czechs: 60
- Slovaks: 60
- Jews: 53
- Italians: 46
- Austrians: 35
- Rusyns: 24
- Regionally affiliated: 829
- Non-declared: 404
- Others: 5,332 (0.264%)

== 2021 census ==
Ethnicity	Number	%
Total	1836713	100
Macedonians	1073299	58.44
Albanians	446245	24.30
Turks	70961	3.86
Romani	46433	2.53
Serbs	23847	1.30
Bosniaks	16042	0.87
Aromanians	8714	0.47
Torbesh	4174	0.23
Bulgarians	3504	0.19
Egyptians	2406	0.13
Croats	2145	0.12
Muslims	1187	0.06
Montenegrins	1023	0.06
Macedonian Muslims	455	0.02
Unknown	472	0.03
Others	2987	0.16
Non-declared	450	0.02
Regionally affiliated	110	0.01
Persons for whom data were obtained from administrative sources	132 260	7.20

== See also ==
- Demographics of North Macedonia
- Demographic history of Macedonia
