= North Macedonia–NATO relations =

Bilateral relations

- NATO: North Macedonia

North Macedonia is a member state of the North Atlantic Treaty Organization (NATO). In 1995, the country joined the Partnership for Peace. It then began taking part in various NATO missions, including the International Security Assistance Force and the Resolute Support Mission in Afghanistan. At the 2008 Bucharest summit, Greece vetoed the country's invitation to join; however, NATO member states agreed that the country would receive an invitation upon resolution of the Macedonia naming dispute. Following an agreement in June 2018 to rename the country, representatives of NATO member states signed a protocol on the accession of North Macedonia to NATO on 6 February 2019. Over the next thirteen months, all of NATO's 29 member states ratified the protocol. The accession protocol entered into force on 19 March 2020, allowing North Macedonia to deposit its instrument of accession and thereby become NATO's 30th member state on 27 March 2020.

== History ==
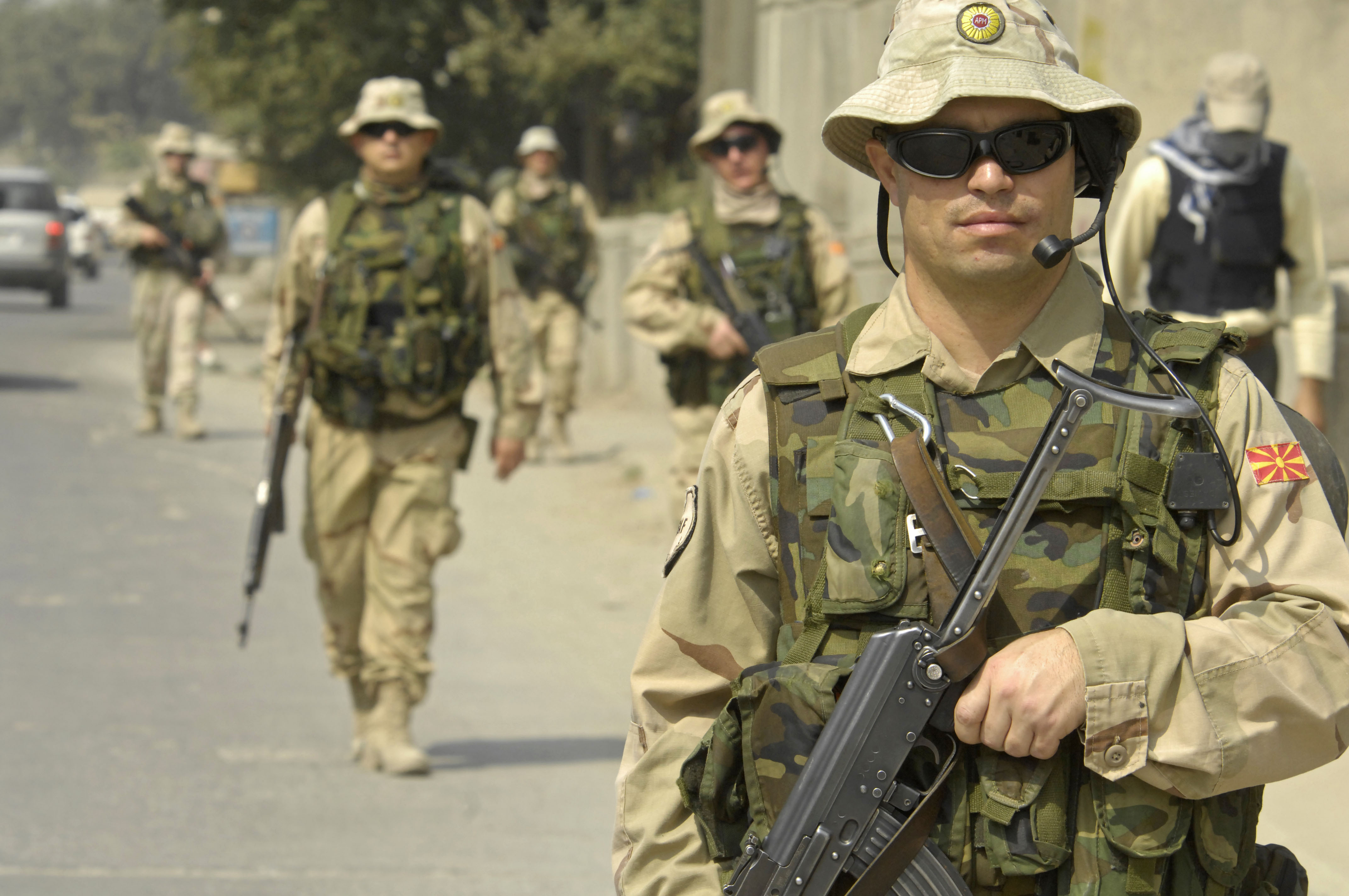
Macedonian troops have participated with NATO security missions including ISAF in Afghanistan and KFOR in Kosovo.

The then-Republic of Macedonia joined the Partnership for Peace in 1995 and commenced its Membership Action Plan in 1999 at the Washington Summit, at the same time as eight other countries (Albania, Bulgaria, Estonia, Latvia, Lithuania, Romania, Slovenia, Slovakia). Macedonia was part of the Vilnius Group and formed the Adriatic Charter with Croatia and Albania in 2003 to better coordinate NATO accession.

Participating in the 1999 NATO intervention in Kosovo, it received aid from NATO in dealing with refugees fleeing from Kosovo. In August 2001, NATO intervened in the 2001 insurgency, during which an Albanian group, the National Liberation Army, fought government forces. In Operation Essential Harvest, NATO troops joined with the Macedonian military to disarm these forces following a cease-fire agreement.

At the 2008 Bucharest summit, Greece vetoed the Republic of Macedonia's invitation to join over the Macedonia naming dispute, however, NATO nations agreed that the country would receive an invitation upon resolution of the disagreement. Greece felt that its neighbour's constitutional name implies territorial aspirations against its own region of Macedonia. The Republic of Macedonia sued Greece in the International Court of Justice over their veto of Macedonia's NATO membership, citing their 1995 interim accord that allowed Macedonia to join international organizations under the name "the Former Yugoslav Republic of Macedonia", which is how NATO, with the exception of Turkey, recognized their bid. Greece counterargued that it was a collective decision of NATO not to invite the Republic of Macedonia, and therefore the interim accord signed between the two countries was not violated. The ICJ ruled in December 2011 that Greece was wrong to have blocked its neighbor's bid, finding them in breach of the agreement. Greece also blocked the Republic of Macedonia's start of negotiations on accession to the European Union over the naming dispute.

Then–United States Secretary of State Hillary Clinton asked the Republic of Macedonia and Greece to find an "acceptable solution" to the dispute, so that the Republic of Macedonia would be free to join NATO. In 2014, prior to the 65th anniversary of its founding, NATO announced that it would not be offering any new countries membership in the organisation that year. Some analysts, such as Jorge Benitez of the Atlantic Council think tank, argued that this reluctance was partly due to the new security climate after Russia's annexation of Crimea. There has been continued debate about how Russia will view the republic's accession.

In March 2016, Macedonian Defense Minister Zoran Jolevski stated his hope that his country's handling of the 2015 European migrant crisis might bring it closer to NATO membership.

On 12 June 2017, Prime Minister Zoran Zaev signaled he would consider alternative names for the country in order to strike a compromise with Greece, settle the naming dispute, and lift Greek objections to Macedonia joining the alliance. Zaev also floated the idea of Macedonia joining the alliance under the provisional name it used at the United Nations. The naming dispute was resolved with the Prespa Agreement in June 2018 under which the country adopted the name North Macedonia, which was supported by a referendum in September 2018. On 11 July 2018, NATO invited the republic to begin membership talks, saying the country could join the organisation once the naming agreement had been implemented. Formal accession talks began on 18 October 2018. On 6 February 2019, the permanent representatives to NATO of the member states signed a protocol on the accession of North Macedonia to NATO.

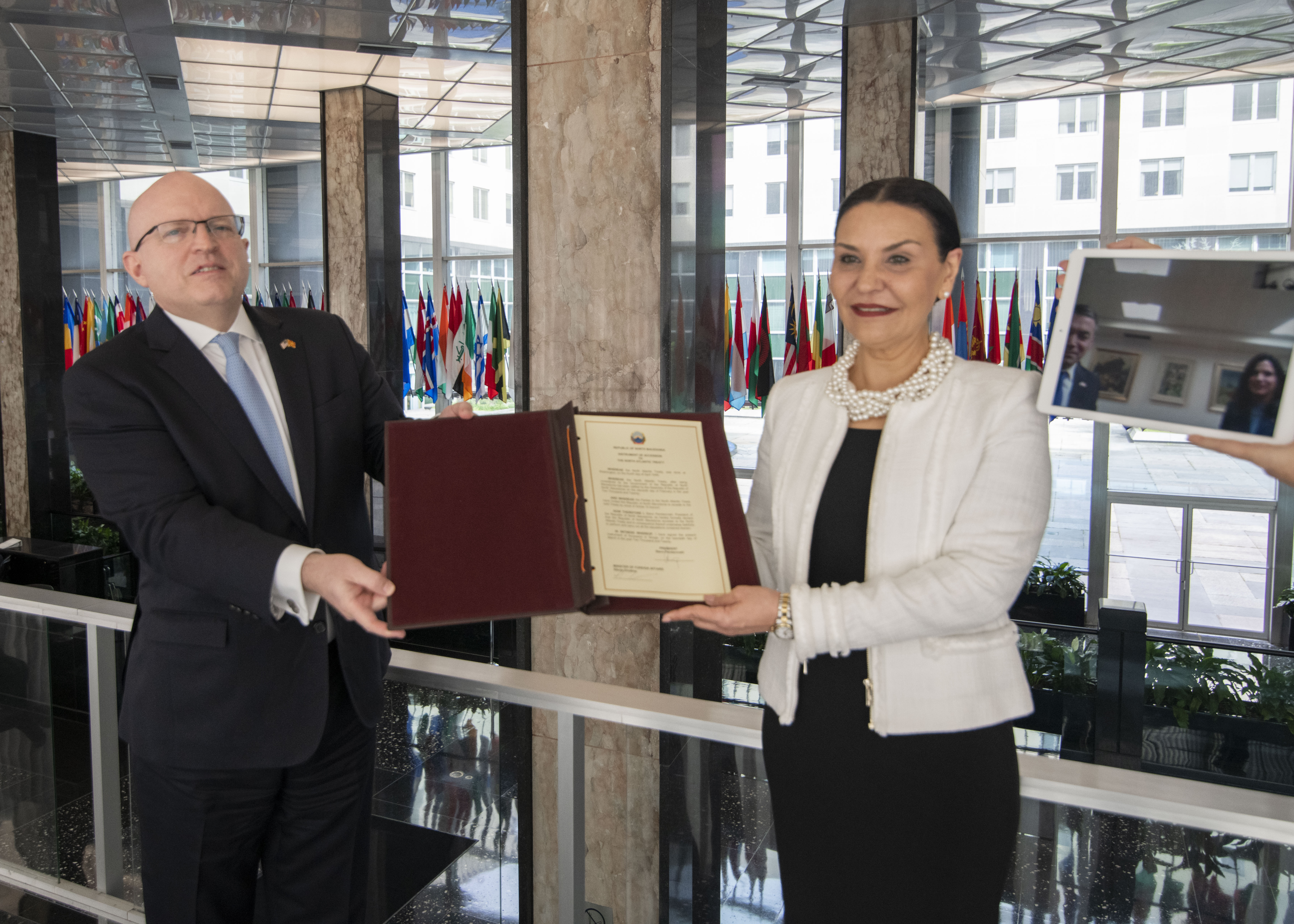
North Macedonia commemorates its accession to NATO at the US Department of State on 27 March 2020

Macedonian Prime Minister Zoran Zaev, speaking alongside NATO Secretary-General Jens Stoltenberg in Skopje on 3 June 2019, said that he expected the ratification process to be finalised by the end of October. By that time North Macedonia was expected to join NATO in early 2020, with the alliance publicly reassuring the country its accession would go ahead. North Macedonia was given a seat at the 2019 London summit alongside other NATO members and was represented by a delegation headed by Prime Minister Zoran Zaev. On 11 February 2020, the Macedonian Sobranie unanimously approved the North Atlantic Treaty, with 114 votes in favour, no abstentions and no opposition. Due to its political crisis, Spain was the last country to ratify the accession protocol, which it did on 19 March 2020. North Macedonia subsequently signed the instrument of accession and became a member state on 27 March 2020.

On 9 December 2021, a ceremony was held at Skopje Airport to mark the inclusion of North Macedonia in the NATO Air Policing system.

The country acceded to the NATO Ottawa Agreement on 2 June 2022.

== Accession ==
North Macedonia NATO Accession Treaty
Protocol to the North Atlantic Treaty on the Accession of the Republic of North Macedonia Macedonian: Протокол кон Северноатлантскиот договор за пристапување на Република Северна Македонија
- Other NATO members North Macedonia
- Type: Accession treaty
- Signed: 6 February 2019
- Location: Brussels, Belgium
- Effective: 27 March 2020
- Condition: Entry into force of the accession treaty after ratification by all current NATO members. Membership of North Macedonia starts after deposit of its instrument of accession after the treaty has entered into force.
- Ratifiers: 29 / 29
- Depositary: United States
- Languages: English and French

=== Negotiation progress ===
| Event | Date |
|---|---|
| Partnership for Peace | 15 November 1995 |
| Membership Action Plan | 19 April 1999 |
| Invitation to join | 11 July 2018 |
| Accession protocol | 6 February 2019 |
| Domestic ratification | 11 February 2020 |
| Treaty in force | 19 March 2020 |
| Member of NATO | 27 March 2020 |

=== Ratification process ===
Ratification status for North Macedonia's membership in NATO
| Signatory | Date | Institution | In favour | Against | AB | Deposited | Ref. |
|---|---|---|---|---|---|---|---|
| Albania | 14 February 2019 | Parliament | 140 | 0 | 0 | 1 April 2019 | |
| Albania | 20 February 2019 | Presidential assent | Granted | | | 1 April 2019 | |
| Belgium | 25 April 2019 | Chamber of Representatives | 131 | 2 | 2 | 6 June 2019 | |
| Belgium | 17 May 2019 | Royal assent | Granted | | | 6 June 2019 | |
| Bulgaria | 20 February 2019 | National Assembly | 140 | 0 | 0 | 18 March 2019 | |
| Bulgaria | 23 February 2019 | Presidential assent | Granted | | | 18 March 2019 | |
| Canada | 19 June 2019 | House of Commons | Passed (Note: The treaty was laid before the House of Commons on 18 March 2019, and the last day a negative resolution could be passed was 19 June 2019.) | | | 19 June 2019 | |
| Croatia | 1 March 2019 | Parliament | 116 | 2 | 0 | 22 May 2019 | |
| Croatia | 6 March 2019 | Presidential assent | Granted | | | 22 May 2019 | |
| Czech Republic | 12 June 2019 | Senate | 52 | 0 | 13 | 25 October 2019 | |
| Czech Republic | 12 September 2019 | Chamber of Deputies | 124 | 8 | 16 | 25 October 2019 | |
| Czech Republic | 8 October 2019 | Presidential assent | Granted | | | 25 October 2019 | |
| Denmark | 26 March 2019 | Folketing | 97 | 0 | 9 | 12 April 2019 | |
| Estonia | 12 June 2019 | Riigikogu | 76 | 0 | 17 | 18 July 2019 | |
| Estonia | 17 June 2019 | Presidential assent | Granted | | | 18 July 2019 | |
| France | 17 October 2019 | Senate | Passed | | | 9 December 2019 | |
| France | 21 November 2019 | National Assembly | Passed | | | 9 December 2019 | |
| France | 28 November 2019 | Presidential assent | Granted | | | 9 December 2019 | |
| Germany | 6 June 2019 | Bundestag | 545 | 160 | 4 | 21 August 2019 | |
| Germany | 28 June 2019 | Bundesrat | Passed | | | 21 August 2019 | |
| Germany | 4 July 2019 | Presidential assent | Granted | | | 21 August 2019 | |
| Greece | 8 February 2019 | Parliament | 153 | 140 | 1 | 21 February 2019 | |
| Greece | 15 February 2019 | Presidential promulgation | Granted | | | 21 February 2019 | |
| Hungary | 25 June 2019 | National Assembly | 153 | 0 | 0 | 24 July 2019 | |
| Hungary | 27 June 2019 | Presidential assent | Granted | | | 24 July 2019 | |
| Iceland | 24 October 2019 | Althing | 32 | 0 | 11 | 14 November 2019 | |
| Italy | 25 June 2019 | Chamber of Deputies | 442 | 0 | 1 | 2 December 2019 | |
| Italy | 16 October 2019 | Senate | 237 | 0 | 2 | 2 December 2019 | |
| Italy | 24 October 2019 | Presidential assent | Granted | | | 2 December 2019 | |
| Latvia | 16 May 2019 | Saeima | 81 | 0 | 0 | 4 June 2019 | |
| Latvia | 22 May 2019 | Presidential assent | Granted | | | 4 June 2019 | |
| Lithuania | 14 March 2019 | Seimas | 92 | 0 | 0 | 30 May 2019 | |
| Lithuania | 20 March 2019 | Presidential assent | Granted | | | 30 May 2019 | |
| Luxembourg | 2 July 2019 | Chamber of Deputies | 58 | 2 | 0 | 25 July 2019 | |
| Luxembourg | 12 July 2019 | Grand Ducal promulgation | Granted | | | 25 July 2019 | |
| Montenegro | 1 March 2019 | Parliament | 44 | 0 | 0 | 18 April 2019 | |
| Montenegro | 4 March 2019 | Presidential assent | Granted | | | 18 April 2019 | |
| Netherlands | 4 July 2019 | House of Representatives | 129 | 21 | 0 | 19 November 2019 | |
| Netherlands | 12 November 2019 | Senate | 59 | 16 | 0 | 19 November 2019 | |
| Netherlands | 13 November 2019 | Royal promulgation | Granted | | | 19 November 2019 | |
| Norway | 5 June 2019 | Storting | 96 | 1 | 0 | 19 July 2019 | |
| Norway | 14 June 2019 | Royal assent | Granted | | | 19 July 2019 | |
| Poland | 4 April 2019 | Sejm | 388 | 1 | 2 | 1 July 2019 | |
| Poland | 11 April 2019 | Senate | 59 | 0 | 0 | 1 July 2019 | |
| Poland | 25 April 2019 | Presidential assent | Granted | | | 1 July 2019 | |
| Portugal | 15 May 2019 | National Assembly | 193 | 36 | 1 | 8 October 2019 | |
| Portugal | 7 August 2019 | Presidential assent | Granted | | | 8 October 2019 | |
| Romania | 27 February 2019 | Chamber of Deputies | 273 | 0 | 0 | 18 July 2019 | |
| Romania | 13 March 2019 | Senate | 96 | 0 | 0 | 18 July 2019 | |
| Romania | 18 March 2019 | Presidential assent | Granted | | | 18 July 2019 | |
| Slovakia | 4 April 2019 | National Council | 111 | 13 | 1 | 22 May 2019 | |
| Slovakia | 24 April 2019 | Presidential assent | Granted | | | 22 May 2019 | |
| Slovenia | 12 February 2019 | National Assembly | 72 | 12 | 0 | 22 March 2019 | |
| Slovenia | 20 February 2019 | Presidential assent | Granted | | | 22 March 2019 | |
| Spain | 27 February 2020 | Congress of Deputies | 279 | 1 | 51 | 19 March 2020 | |
| Spain | 17 March 2020 | Senate | 243 | 0 | 21 | 19 March 2020 | |
| Spain | 17 March 2020 | Royal assent | Granted | | | 19 March 2020 | |
| Turkey | 11 July 2019 | National Assembly | 255 | 7 | 1 | 9 December 2019 | |
| Turkey | 24 July 2019 | Presidential assent (legislative) | Granted | | | 9 December 2019 | |
| Turkey | 4 October 2019 | Presidential assent (executive) | Granted | | | 9 December 2019 | |
| United Kingdom | 25 September 2019 | Parliament | Passed (Note: In the United Kingdom, there is no requirement for a formal law approving of treaties before their ratification, but the Ponsonby Rule is that they are laid before Parliament with an explanatory memorandum. The treaty was laid before parliament on 27 June 2019, and the last day a negative resolution could be passed was 25 September 2019.) | | | 24 October 2019 | |
| United Kingdom | 16 October 2019 | Government | Granted | | | 24 October 2019 | |
| United States | 22 October 2019 | Senate | 91 | 2 | 0 | 29 November 2019 | |
| United States | 26 November 2019 | Presidential assent | Granted | | | 29 November 2019 | |

== Public opinion ==
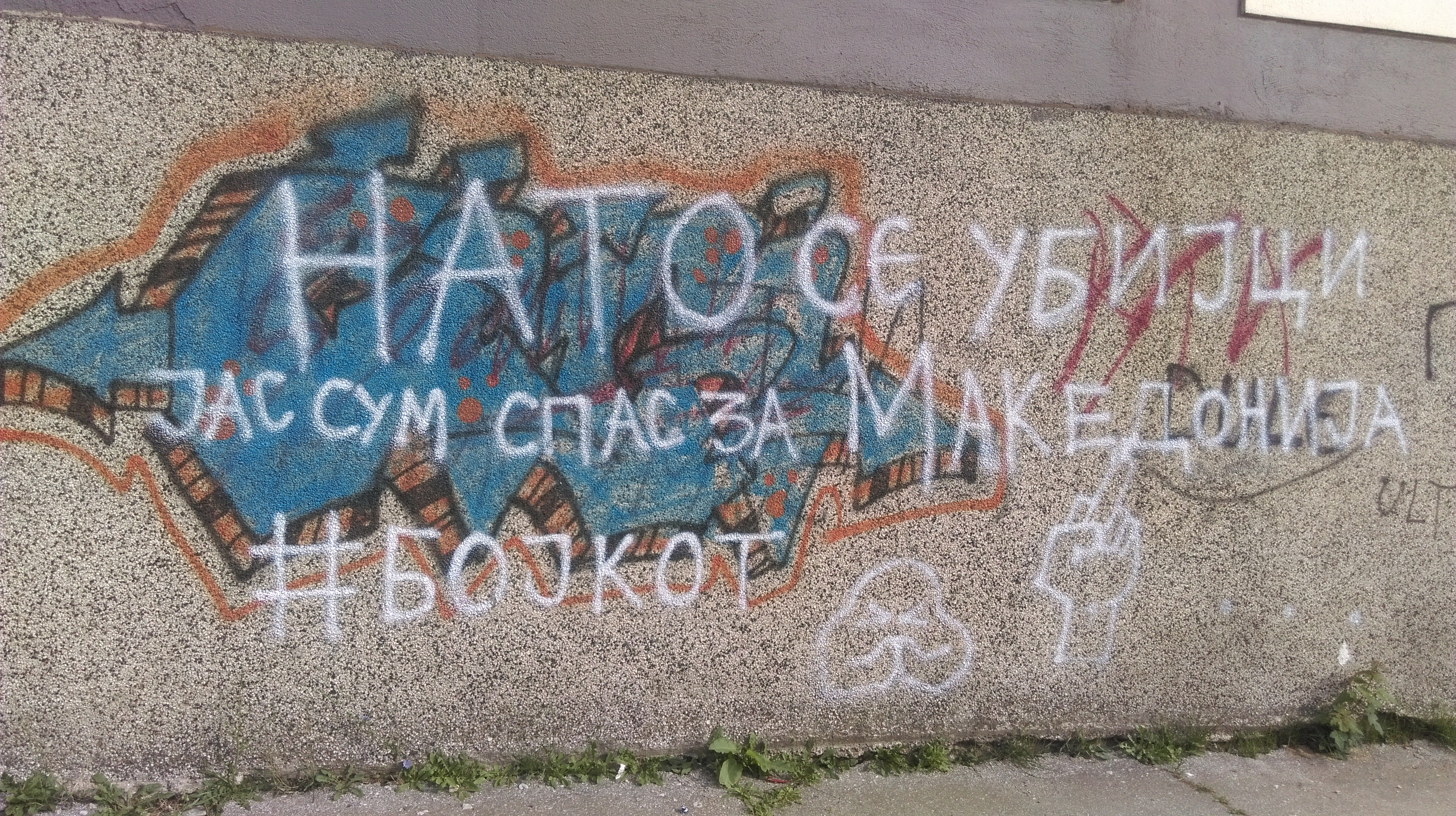
Anti-NATO graffiti in Ohrid in July 2018, translating to "NATO are killers. I am the salvation of Macedonia. #Boycott."

During the Kosovo War of 1999, the Macedonian government maintained a pro-NATO position. A majority of the population of the Republic of Macedonia criticised the government stance and opposed NATO intervention in Kosovo due to fears over irredentism from ethnic Albanians within the country, the unstable economy, disruption of trade brought about by war, and Slavic solidarity with Serbs. Prime Minister Ljubčo Georgievski stated during the war that anti-NATO sentiment was the "second biggest threat" to the country after the arrival of Albanian refugees from Kosovo. The country's Albanian population supported NATO and its intervention to assist the Albanians of Kosovo.

In 2008, a poll following the NATO summit showed that 82.5% of ethnic Macedonian citizens opposed changing their country's constitutional name in order to join NATO. NATO membership in general in 2008 was supported by 85.2% of the population. Elections were called following the 2008 summit, resulting in further support for the center-right pro-NATO party, VMRO-DPMNE. The elections were marred by violence that attracted criticism from NATO members.

In a statewide 2010 survey, 80.02% of respondents said they would vote for the Republic of Macedonia to become part of NATO if a referendum on accession were to take place. In another survey, some 65% of ethnic Macedonians expressed that they opposed a name change of the state as being the price for NATO membership.

In a 2016 poll, some 68% of ethnic Macedonians supported joining NATO, possibly under the FYROM name. Albanians of North Macedonia harbour strongly pro-NATO sentiments.

== North Macedonia's foreign relations with NATO member states ==
- Albania
- Belgium
- Bulgaria
- Canada
- Croatia
- Czech Republic
- Denmark
- Estonia
- Finland
- France
- Germany
- Greece
- Hungary
- Iceland
- Italy
- Latvia
- Lithuania
- Luxembourg
- Montenegro
- Netherlands
- Norway
- Poland
- Portugal
- Romania
- Slovakia
- Slovenia
- Spain
- Sweden
- Turkey
- United Kingdom
- United States

== See also ==
- Accession of North Macedonia to the European Union
- Enlargement of NATO
- Foreign relations of North Macedonia
- Macedonia naming dispute
