= Macedonians of Croatia =

Macedonians in Croatia Македонци во Хрватска Makedonci u Hrvatskoj
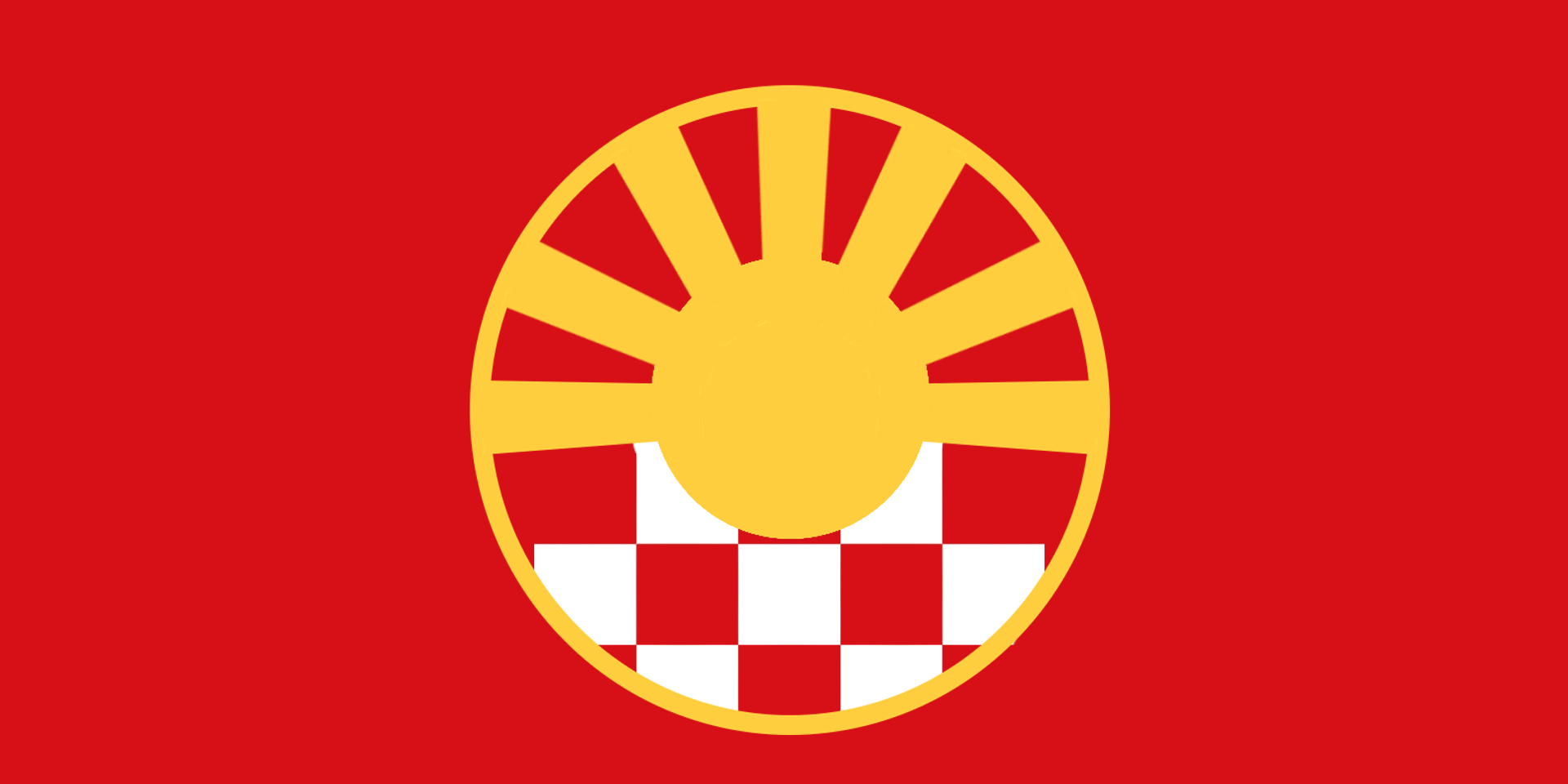

Total population
- 4,138

Regions with significant populations
- Zagreb; Zagreb County; Istria County; Osijek-Baranja

Languages
- Macedonian and Croatian

Religion
- Macedonian Orthodox Latin Catholic

Related ethnic groups
- Other South Slavs

Macedonians in Croatia refers to the group of ethnic Macedonians who reside in Croatia. According to the official census of 2011, there are 4,138 ethnic Macedonians in Croatia.

Macedonians are recognised as an autochthonous national minority, and as such they elect a special representative to the Croatian Parliament, shared with members of four other national minorities.

== Migration ==
Macedonians have been migrating to Croatia since the time of the SFR Yugoslavia. Early migration was primarily of Macedonians from a rural background. These migrants have been joined by newer business migrants who have come to Croatia for the opportunities offered. Many settled in the national capital, Zagreb, and the Istria region. Macedonian communities can also be found in larger towns such as Osijek, Pula, and Zadar.

== Culture ==
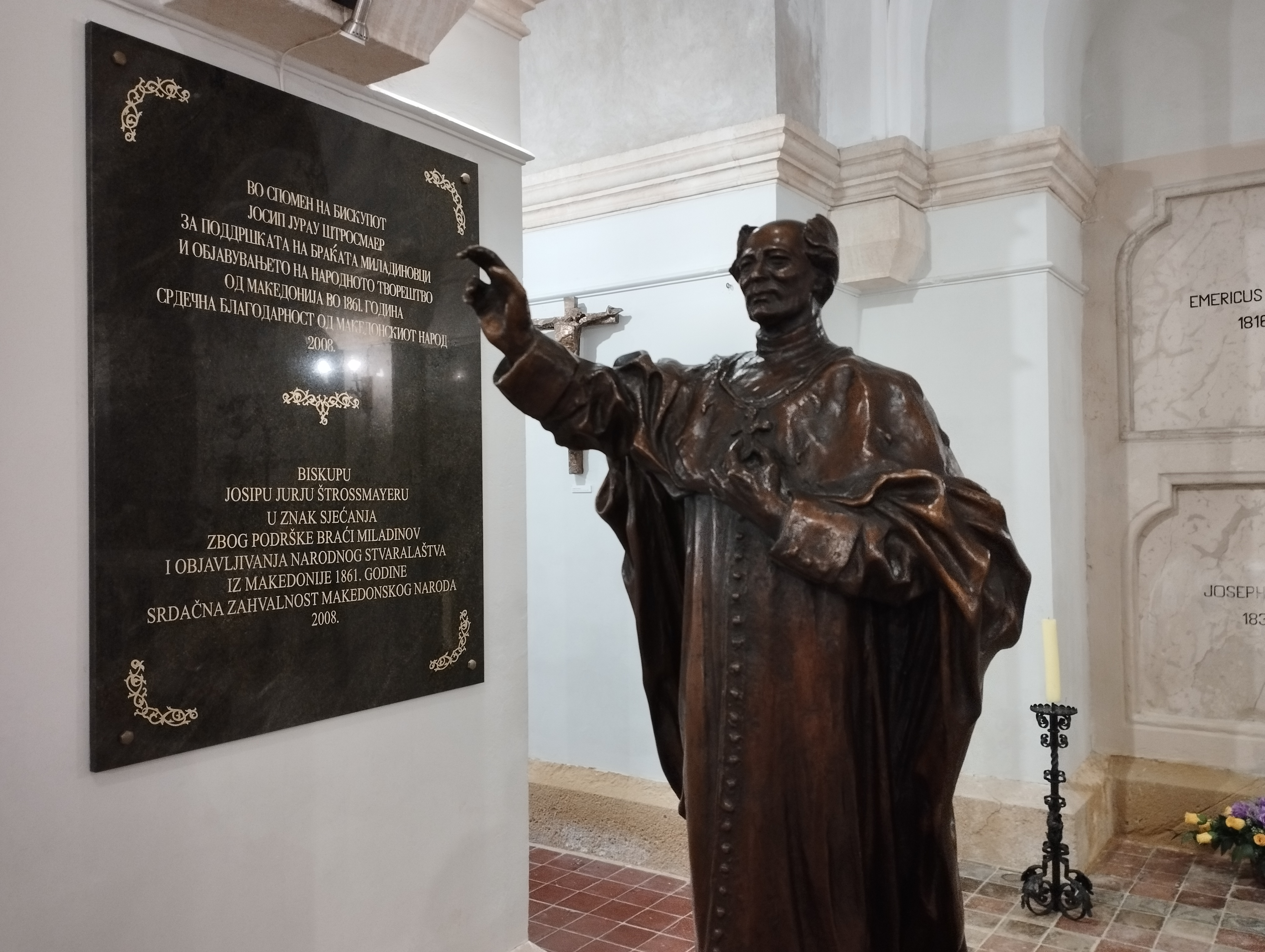
Macedonian memorial in the krypt of the Đakovo Cathedral.

The main Macedonian cultural association in Croatia is the Macedonian Community in Republic of Croatia (Croatian: Zajednica Makedonaca u Republici Hrvatskoj). It was founded in 1992 and it branches over six other smaller organisations from the major cities where Macedonians reside. The Cultural associations are as follows; KUD-Ohridski Biser from Zagreb, KUD-Makedonija from Split, KUD-Biljana from Zadar, KUD-Brak Miladinov from Osijek, KUD-Ilinden from Rijeka and KUD-Kočo Racin from Pula.

The associations encourage traditional Macedonian folklore and customs from the motherland. They also encourage the upkeep of Macedonian heritage, language and traditions in Croatia.

A lectorate in Macedonian language was established at the University of Rijeka in 2008.

== Religion ==
Macedonians in Croatia are predominantly adherents to the Macedonian Orthodox Church . There are four organised church communities which are abbreviated to the MPCO (Macedonian: Makedonska Pravoslavna Crkovna Opština). The four Communities are St. Zlata Meglenska of Zagreb, St.Naum of Ohrid in Split, St.Joachim of Osogovo of Pula and St.Tsar Constantin and Tsaritsa Elena of Rijeka. Father Kiro Velinski holds liturgy in Zagreb and Split.

The Macedonian Orthodox Church of Saint Zlata of Meglen in Zagreb was dedicated in May 2023.

== Media ==
There are several Macedonian language newspapers operating in Croatia. The most prominent is Makedonski glas (Macedonian: Македонски Глас, meaning Macedonian voice) which has been in print since the 1990s. It is printed with financial assistance from the Croatian government.

== Macedonians by counties and cities ==
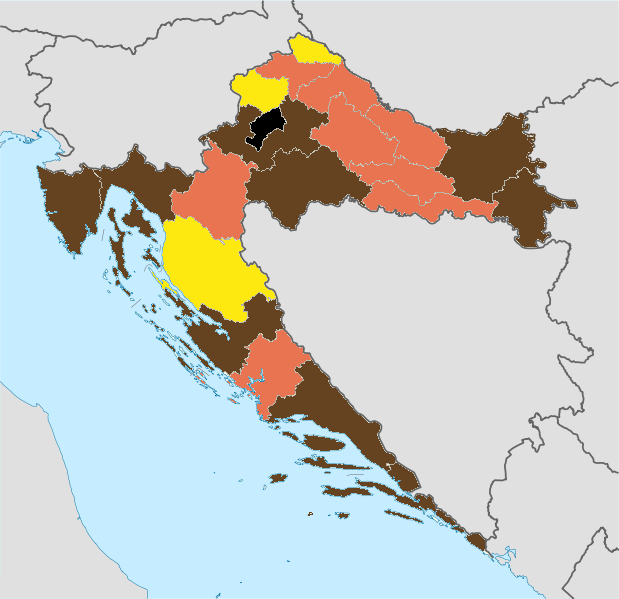
<1000 100-500 50-100 50<

County	Macedonians	%
City of Zagreb	1,036	0.14%
Istria	488	0.25%
Primorje-Gorski Kotar	443	0.17%
Split-Dalmatia	269	0.06%
Osijek-Baranja	230	0.09%
Zagreb County	206	0.07%
Zadar	98	0.06%
Sisak-Moslavina	90	0.06%
Dubrovnik-Neretva	89	0.08%
Karlovac	86	0.08%
Vukovar-Syrmia	69	0.05%
Šibenik-Knin	68	0.07%
Bjelovar-Bilogora	56	0.05%
Požega-Slavonia	48	0.07%
Međimurje	47	0.04%
Varaždin	43	0.03%
Virovitica-Podravina	43	0.06%
Koprivnica-Križevci	42	0.04%
Krapina-Zagorje	41	0.03%
Brod-Posavina	39	0.03%
Lika-Senj	24	0.06%

10 most populated cities with Macedonians
No	City	Macedonians	%
1	Zagreb	1,036	0.14
2	Rijeka	240	0.22
3	Pula	203	0.39
4	Split	145	0.09
5	Osijek	139	0.14
6	Zadar	63	0.09
7	Karlovac	62	0.13
8	Velika Gorica	57	0.09
9	Šibenik	46	0.11
10	Sisak	43	0.11

== Notable Macedonian Croatians ==
- Ljupka Dimitrovska - singer
- Ljiljana Nikolovska - singer
- Aki Rahimovski - singer
- Ordan Petlevski - artist
- Sibila Petlevski - author
- Goce Sedloski - football manager, former footballer
- Branko Trajkov - drummer
- Kostadinka Velkovska - actor

== See also ==
- Croatia–North Macedonia relations
- Macedonian diaspora
- Ethnic groups in Croatia
- Croats in North Macedonia
- St. Zlata Meglenska's Church, Zagreb
