= Croatia–North Macedonia relations =

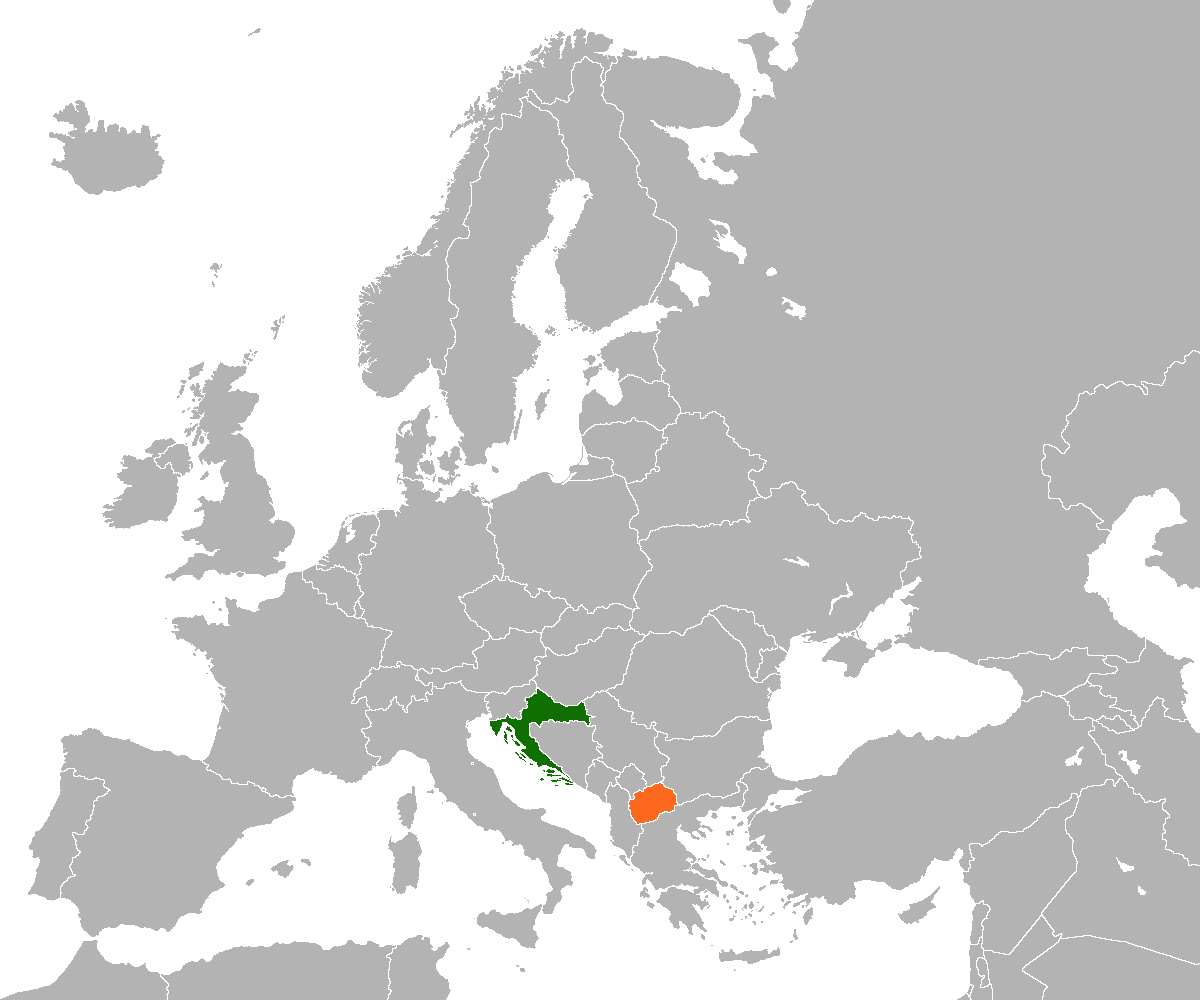

- Croatia: North Macedonia

Croatia–North Macedonia relations are the foreign relations between Croatia and North Macedonia. The two countries established diplomatic relations on 30 March 1992. Croatia is represented in North Macedonia via its embassy in Skopje and an honorary consulate in Strumica, while North Macedonia is represented in Croatia via its embassy and the Cultural and Informational Center in Zagreb, as well as a consulate in Rijeka and an honorary consulate in Zadar. Croatia supports North Macedonia's European Union membership. Before their independence in the early 1990s, both countries were constituent republics of the Socialist Federal Republic of Yugoslavia as SR Croatia and SR Macedonia, respectively. Croatia was one of the first countries in the world to recognize the independence of the country during the period in which Zagreb itself awaited international recognition. During the long-lasting Macedonia naming dispute (1991–2019) and before the signing of the Prespa agreement, Croatia was the first country in the world to recognize North Macedonia under its constitutional name of the Republic of Macedonia instead of the designation "the former Yugoslav Republic of Macedonia". Today, both countries are full members of the Council of Europe and NATO. Croatia is an EU member and North Macedonia is an EU candidate. Since 2006, North Macedonia has been a member state of the Central European Free Trade Agreement, while Croatia was a member of the agreement between 2003 and 2013. Croatia strongly supports accession of North Macedonia to the European Union and also supported its NATO membership, being one of the first countries to ratify the membership protocol. Trade between the two countries reached 221 million euros in 2020.

In her 2013 analysis of Croatian relations with Western Balkans countries Senior Research Associate at the Institute for Development and International Relations in Zagreb Senada Šelo Šabić recognized that Croatian policy towards Macedonia is based on fostering good relations. Nevertheless, she also recognized insufficiencies of this approach in which in the case of any instability Zagreb would follow the official position of Brussels institutions instead of being a well informed link between the region and the EU capable of helping Brussels decision-making in prevention of possible escalation.

== History ==
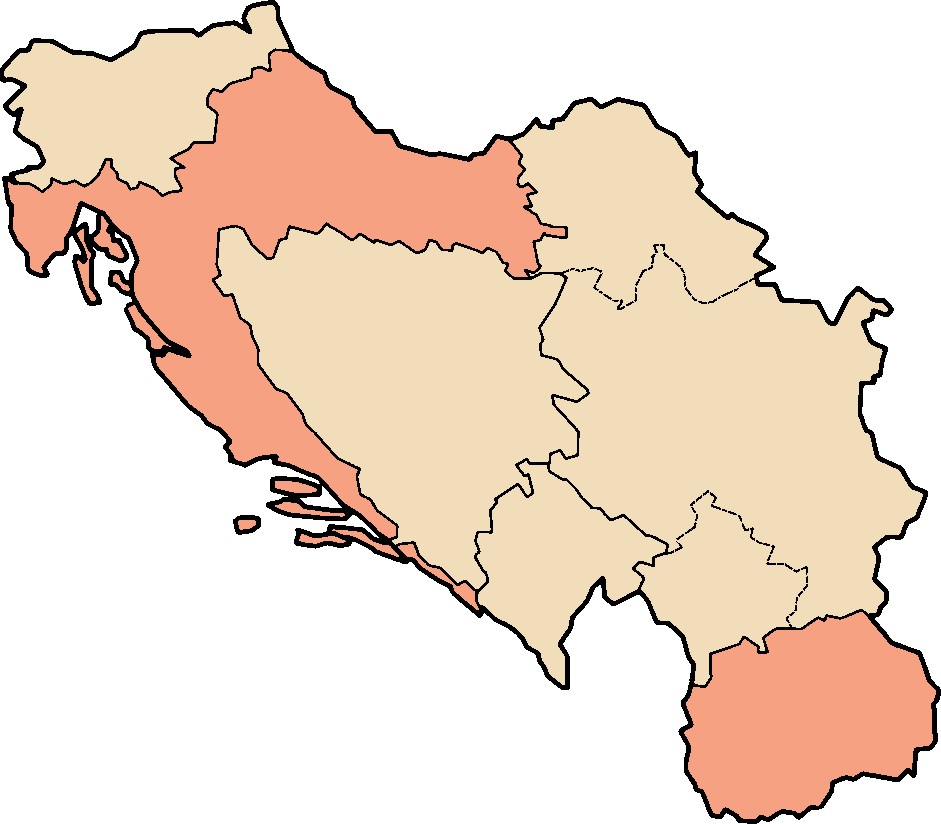
Historical map of the SR Croatia and SR Macedonia within the SFR Yugoslavia.

During the existence of Kingdom of Yugoslavia extreme nationalist and fascist Croatian organization of Ustaše and the Internal Macedonian Revolutionary Organization collaborated in their disruptive and terrorist activities, most notoriously in the case of 1934 assassination of King of Yugoslavia Alexander I and French Foreign Minister Louis Barthou in Marseille during king's state visit to France. In 26 August 1936 at the University of Zagreb a group of Macedonian students belonging to the MANAPO signed the Political Declaration, an illegal document requesting political and social emancipation of Macedonians in the Kingdom of Yugoslavia.

== Cultural and scientific cooperation ==
The independent Section for Macedonian language and literature at the Department of South Slavic Languages of the Faculty of Humanities and Social Sciences, University of Zagreb was established in 1967/68.

== NATO and EU ==
Croatia joined NATO and the EU in 2009 and 2013, respectively. Croatia supported North Macedonia's aspirations to join NATO and ratified North Macedonia's accession in 2019. North Macedonia joined NATO in 2020 and is an EU candidate.

== Resident diplomatic missions ==
- Croatia has an embassy in Skopje and an honorary consulate in Strumica.
- North Macedonia has an embassy in Zagreb, a consulate in Rijeka, and an honorary consulate in Zadar.
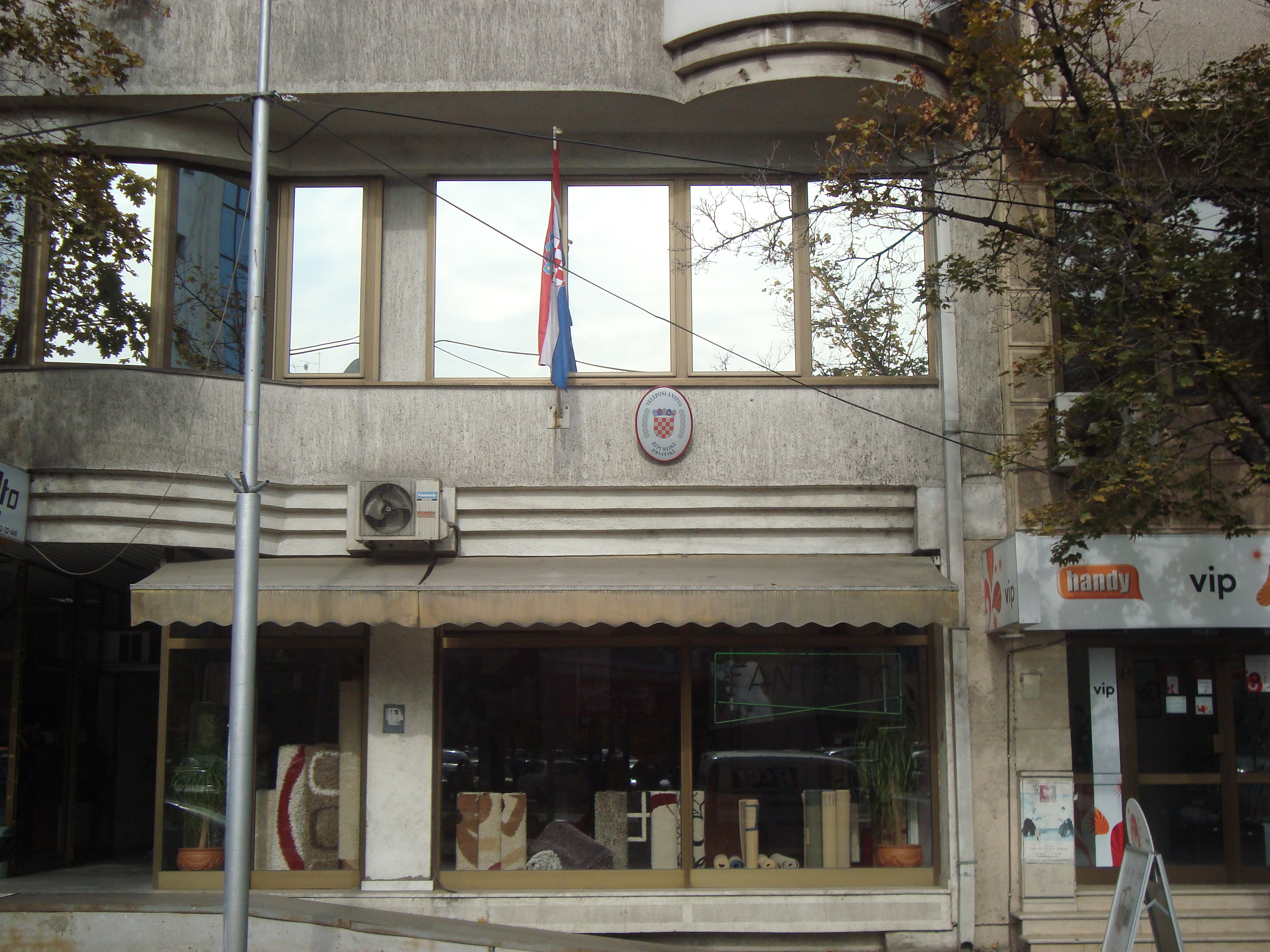
Embassy of Croatia in Skopje

== See also ==
- Foreign relations of Croatia
- Foreign relations of North Macedonia
- Accession of North Macedonia to the EU
- NATO-EU relations
- Macedonians of Croatia
- Croats of North Macedonia
- Agreement on Succession Issues of the Former Socialist Federal Republic of Yugoslavia
