= Sibila Petlevski =

Croatian poet

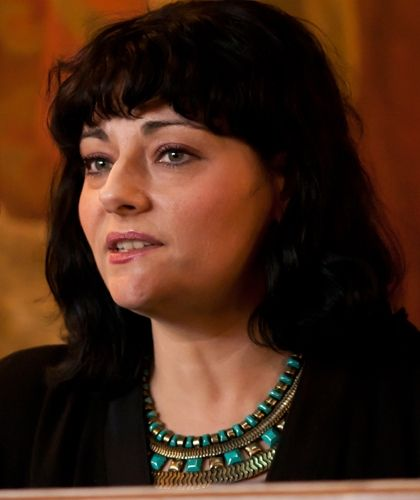
- Born: May 11, 1964 (age 62); Zagreb
- Occupations: Poet, playwright, novelist, academic
- Relatives: Ordan Petlevski
- Writing career
- Notable awards: Vladimir Nazor Award

Sibila Petlevski (born 11 May 1964) is a Croatian writer of Macedonian descent, who is a poet, playwright, and Professor at the Academy of Dramatic Arts, University of Zagreb.

== Biography ==
Petlevski was born in Zagreb on 11 May 1964. Her father was the famous painter Ordan Petlevski, and her mother is the painter Biserka Baretić. She graduated with a degree in Comparative Literature and English Language at the Faculty of Philosophy in Zagreb in 1988, and received her master's degree in 1991. Her doctorate was awarded in 1996 with the dissertation "Modernism: Examples from Croatian Theater and Drama and their Central European Context". She is a member of the French L'Académie Mallarmé (fr) and l'Académie Européenne de Poésie, was President of the Croatian PEN Center (2001-2005) and was a Member of the International Steering Committee of PEN International (2002-2007). She has also been appointed to the jury for the EU Prize for Literature. She is professor at the Academy of Dramatic Arts, University of Zagreb. Her award-winning poetry has been compared to that of Adriana Škunca (hr), Gordana Benić, Milana Vuković Runjić (hr) and Dubravka Oraić Tolić.

== Awards ==
- Vladimir Nazor Award, Annual National Prize for Literature and Arts (1993)
- Petar Brečić Prize for Theatre Studies (2001)
- tportal prize for Best Croatian Novel
- Teatar.hr Award - Person of the Year (2013)
