= Montenegrins of North Macedonia =

Montenegrins of North Macedonia Македонски Црногорци
Total population
- 1,023

Languages
- Macedonian, Montenegrn

Religion
- Eastern Orthodoxy, Islam

Related ethnic groups
- Montenegrins

Montenegrins form an ethnic minority in North Macedonia. In the 2021 census, there were 1,023 declared Montenegrins. Today, the majority of Montenegrins primarily speak Macedonian. In 2010, it was estimated that around 10,000 Macedonians have Montenegrin ancestry, and 253 Montenegrins lived in Ohrid.

== History ==
The first significant immigration of Montenegrins to Macedonia started soon after the creation of the Kingdom of Serbs, Croats, and Slovenes, with the process of the colonization of the Vardar Banovina (25 September 1920 Settlement Decree), where they received land in Debelo Polje. The main centers were near the Greek border, around the towns of Gevgelija, Dojran, Kavadarci, Resen, Bitola, and Ohrid. Today, there are around 250 descendants of this wave living in Ohrid. The second period occurred after the end of the Second World War, in 1955-56, during a wave of emigration of Muslims from Yugoslavia to Turkey. This was caused by the 1953 informal agreement between Yugoslavia and Turkey to expedite the emigration of Yugoslav Turks, especially those who had relatives in Turkey. In SR Macedonia, the process was initiated through the Turkish Consulate in Skopje. However, many non-Turkish Muslims in Yugoslavia passed through the process because of documentary issues, especially for applicants outside the state, administrative apathy, and the liberal approach of Turkish immigration policy. However, after the closure of the border in 1956- when the Consulate started to strictly permit only Macedonian Turks- some Montenegrins remained in Prilep, Dolneni, Lažani, Veles, and Skopje. Finally, the third period started after the 1963 Skopje earthquake, primarily from northern Montenegro. They settled in enclaves around the city: Ljubin, Donje Konjare, and Gornje Konjare. One part of this community has since moved to Skopje, and another part emigrated to western Europe. Besides this, intermittent naturalization of officers, civil servants, and others, upon the completion of their education, occurred.

In 2006, the organization Community of Montenegrins in RN Macedonia was founded.

== Demographics ==
Historical population
Year	Pop.	±%
1948	2,348	—
1953	2,526	+7.6%
1961	3,414	+35.2%
1971	3,246	−4.9%
1981	3,940	+21.4%
1991	3,225	−18.1%
1994	2,318	−28.1%
2002	2,003	−13.6%
2021	1,023	−48.9%

== See also ==
- Montenegro–North Macedonia relations
- Montenegrin diaspora
- Ethnic groups in North Macedonia
- Macedonians in Montenegro
