= Ordan Petlevski =

Croatian visual artist (1930–1997)

Ordan Petlevski (24 January 1930, Prilep – 22 January 1997, Zagreb) was a prominent artist working in the media of painting, drawing, graphic arts and illustration.

== Education and career ==
In the early 1950s, Petlevski came to study in Zagreb, where he remained for the rest of his life. In 1955, he graduated from the Academy of Applied Arts; then from 1955 to 1960, he was an associate of the Master workshop. In the early phase of his career (1954–1957), he painted stylized human figures, which he later replaced with surrealism, and later still with his own version of the informal art style with organic art forms.

== Exhibitions and awards ==
He exhibited at many solo shows in Zagreb, Belgrade, Skopje, Sarajevo and Paris, and participated in over 200 international exhibitions:

- He exhibited at the Venice Biennale in 1964 with Oton Gliha, Edo Murtić, Zlatko Prica, Fran Šimunović, Vojin Bakić and Dušan Džamonja.
- Two retrospective exhibitions were held featuring his work: one at the Art Pavilion in Zagreb, (1973) and one at Gallery Klovićevi Dvori (Zagreb, 1999).

He received numerous awards, including:

- First Prize at the 1st International Youth Biennale (Paris, 1959),
- Swiss Award for Painting (Lausanne, 1961),
- First Prize for Painting at the 1st Yugoslavian Triennial of Fine Arts (Belgrade, 1961),
- First Prize at the 1st Contemporary Croatian Graphic Arts Biennale (Split, 1974), and the Vladimir Nazor Award (1978).

== Artist style ==
His first works were based on his tradition and his own world view while reflecting his personality and held a somewhat morbid tone. His later works combined abstract expression with organic and biological expression. They bordered the real and unreal. Even with the explosion of colors and shapes, he still maintained a morbid tone.

== Personal life ==
Petlevski was married to the painter Biserka Baretić, with whom he had a daughter, Sibila Petlevski.

== Published works on Ordan Petlevski ==
- Zidić, Igor - Ordan Petlevski, (Art Gallery, Sarajevo, 1968).
