= Montenegro–North Macedonia relations =

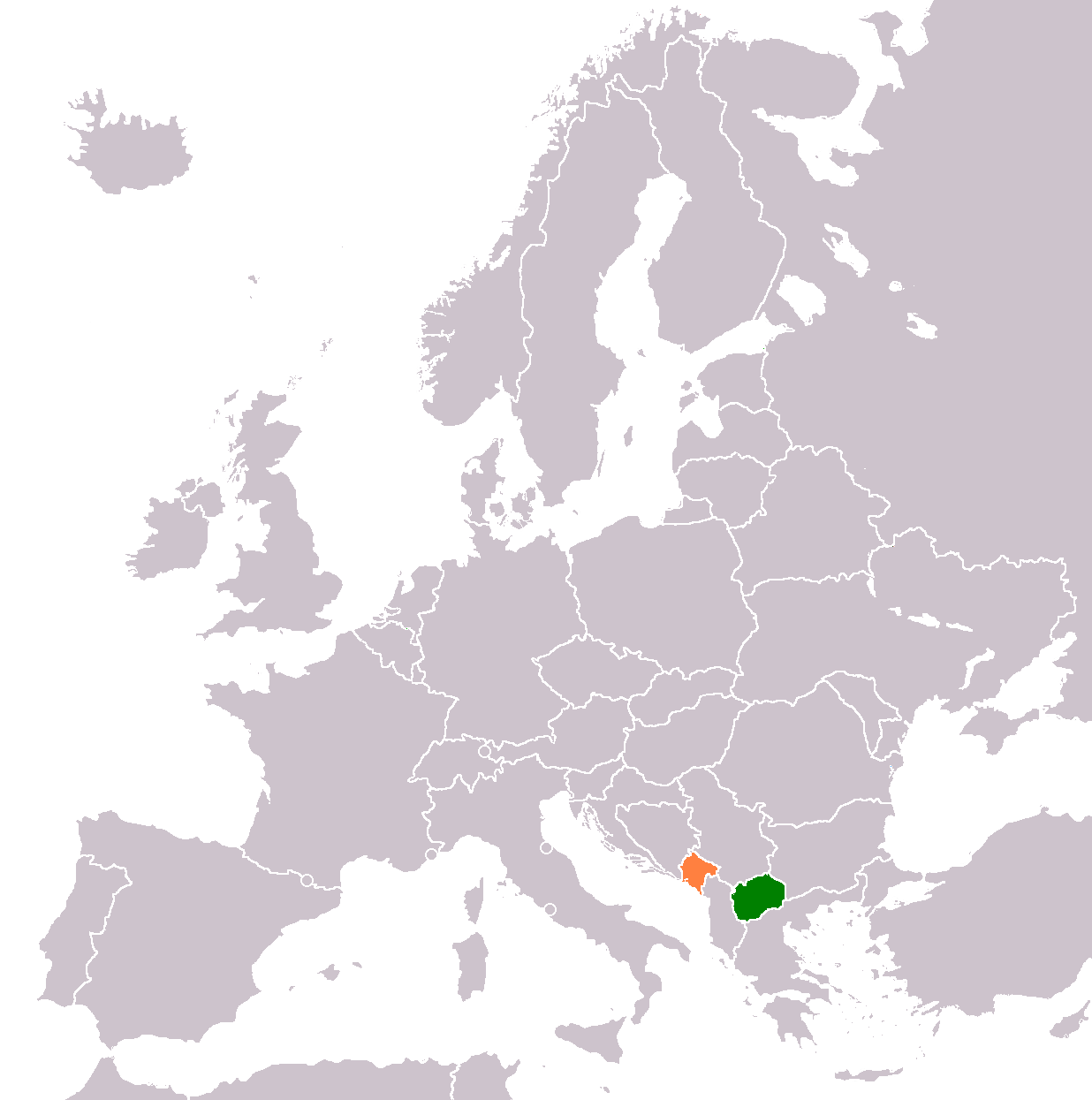

- North Macedonia: Montenegro

Both Montenegro and the Republic of North Macedonia are full members of the Council of Europe and of the NATO. Both countries are candidates for the EU. The Foreign Ministry of North Macedonia states the two countries have excellent political ties, without any open issues between the two countries. The embassy of North Macedonia to Montenegro is located in the capital city of Podgorica. Montenegro's embassy in North Macedonia is also located in the country's capital city, which is Skopje. Also, Montenegro has an honorary consulate in the city of Bitola.

== History ==
The two now-independent states of Montenegro and North Macedonia share a common history, as both were constituent republics of the Socialist Federal Republic of Yugoslavia.

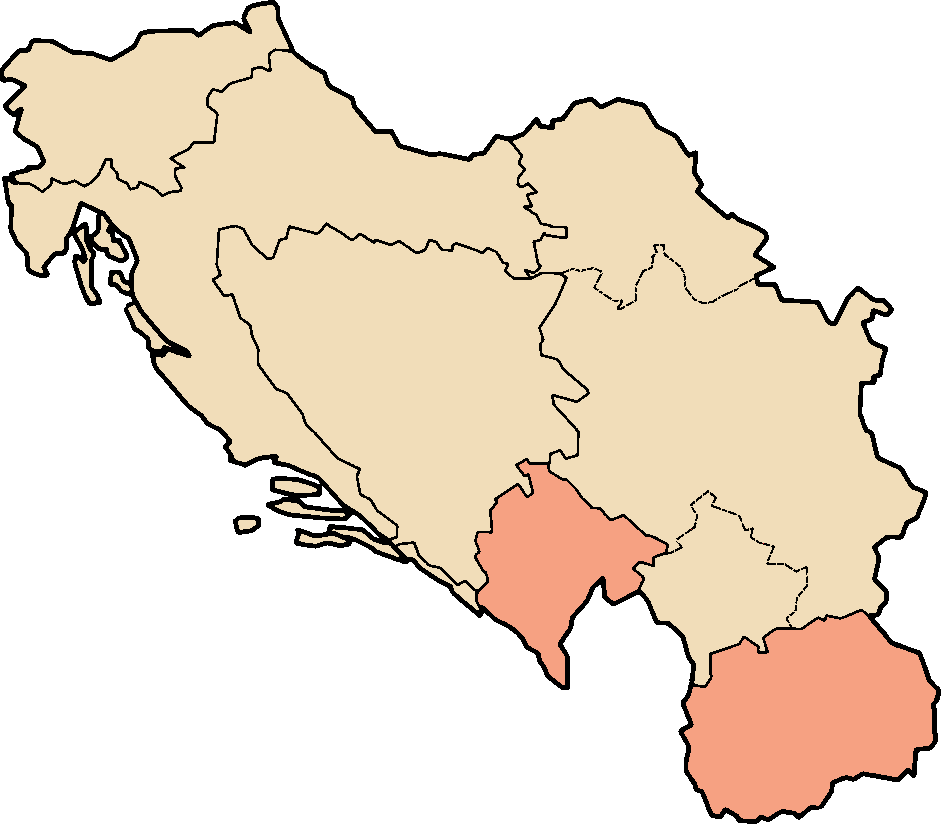
The Socialist Republic of Montenegro and the Socialist Republic of Macedonia inside Yugoslavia

When Yugoslavia began dissolving in the early 1990s, the two Yugoslav republics Slovenia and Croatia declared independence from Yugoslavia on 25 June 1991. The Republic of Macedonia voted on a referendum on 8 September 1991 in favor of a sovereign state and also declared independence. Montenegro organised an independence referendum as well, but decided to stay in Yugoslavia.

In April 1992 the remaining Yugoslav republics Montenegro and Serbia formed the Federal Republic of Yugoslavia. Diplomatic relations between the Federal Republic of Yugoslavia and the Republic of Macedonia were established on 8 April 1996. The relations between the two countries were solid and friendly. In 2003, the name of the Federal Republic of Yugoslavia was changed to State Union of Serbia and Montenegro, reflecting the two parts (republics) of which it consisted.

In 2006, Montenegro held a second referendum on its independence. The referendum was successful and Montenegro became a sovereign state, thus Serbia and Montenegro was dissolved resulting in Serbia also becoming an independent country.

== Relations ==
Diplomatic relations between Montenegro and North Macedonia were established on 14 June 2006.

Relations are close with both countries sharing the common goal of joining the European Union. Montenegro is also among the 131 states in the world which recognized North Macedonia by its former constitutional name.

== Montenegrins in North Macedonia ==
There is a small number of Montenegrins living in North Macedonia. According to the last census carried out in North Macedonia in 2002, the Montenegrin minority makes up 2,003 people, which is about 0.1% of the total population of North Macedonia.

== Macedonians in Montenegro ==
A small Macedonian minority also exists in Montenegro. The last census carried out in 2023 showed that 834 persons declared themselves to be Macedonian, which is 0,13% of the total population of Montenegro. 301 of them live in the capital city of Podgorica.

== Resident diplomatic missions ==
- Montenegro has an embassy in Skopje.
- North Macedonia has an embassy in Podgorica.

== See also ==
- Foreign relations of Montenegro
- Foreign relations of North Macedonia
- Agreement on Succession Issues of the Former Socialist Federal Republic of Yugoslavia
