= Croats in North Macedonia =

Ethnic Croats form a small minority North Macedonia. As of 2002, there were 2,686 declared Croats living in the country . They mostly live in the capital city Skopje, the second largest city Bitola and around Lake Ohrid.

In 2006, Croatian President Stjepan Mesić and his Macedonian counterpart Nikola Gruevski announced that the Croats would receive national minority status in Macedonia.

== Union of Croats of Macedonia ==
The Union of Croats in Macedonia (Croatian: Zajednica Hrvata u Republici Sjevernoj Makedoniji; Macedonian: Заедница на Хрватите во Македонија, romanized: Zaednica na Hrvatite vo Makedonija) is the name of an umbrella group which represents the ethnic Croats living in North Macedonia. The Union was founded in 1996. It is headquartered in Skopje, with branches in Bitola, Štip and Ohrid-Struga. The Union has 1,187 members as of 2008, which is approximately 45% of the entire Croat population in the Republic of Macedonia, according to the 2002 census.

In 2005, along with the Croatian Heritage Foundation, the union organised the Week of Croats in Macedonia in Zagreb as part of its annual minority week.

== Party of Croats of Macedonia ==
In early 2026, the Party of Croats in Macedonia (Croatian: Stranka Hrvata u Sjevernoj Makedoniji) was founded as a way to promote the interests of the Croatian minority. The party aims to enshrine the status of the Croats as a national minority in the constitution. It also holds strong Pro-European and Atlanticist views, wanting North Macedonia to be integrated into EU and NATO, seeing it as the only way to preserve national interests, which includes the interests of the Croats.

== Demographics ==
Number of Croats in North Macedonia and their % share of the population between 1953–1991
North Macedonia	1953	1961	1971	1981	1991
Croats	2,710 (0.2%)	3,750 (0.3%)	3,882 (0.2%)	3,307 (0.2%)	2,450 (0.1%)

== See also ==
- Croatia–North Macedonia relations
- Croats
- Ethnic groups in North Macedonia
- Macedonians of Croatia
