= Demographics of North Macedonia =

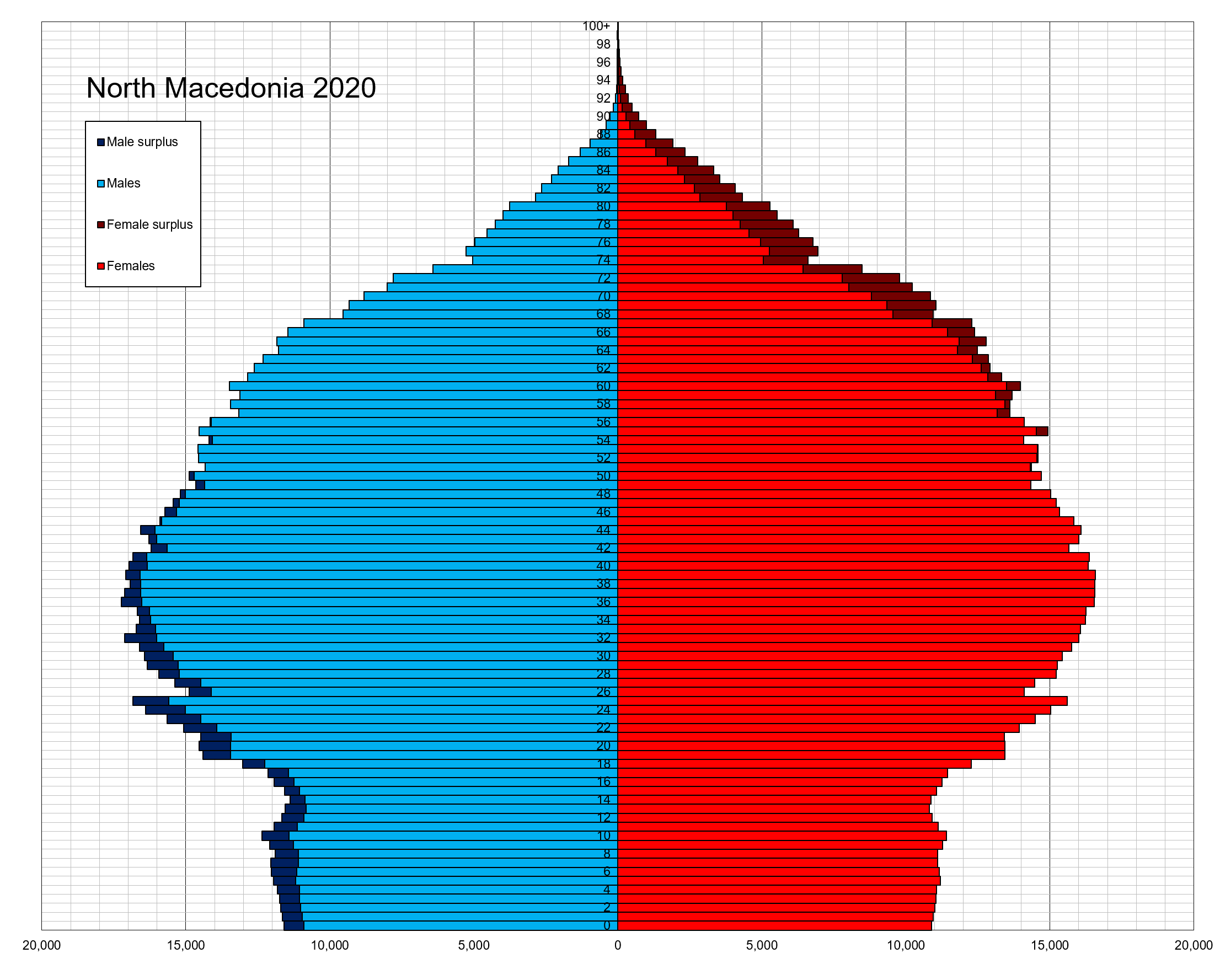
- North Macedonia population pyramid in 2020
- Population: ▼1,836,713 (2021)
- Growth rate: ▼ −0.32% (2020)
- Birth rate: ▼9.2 per 1,000 (2020)
- Death rate: ▲12.4 per 1,000 (2020)
- Life expectancy: ▲76.40 years (2020)
  - male: ▲74.45 years (2020)
  - female: ▲78.41 years (2020)
- Fertility rate: ▲1.59 live births per woman (2020)
- Infant mortality: ▲6.7 per 1,000 (2020)
- Net migration rate: ▲ −766 (2020)
- Immigrant share: 8.3% (2024)

Age structure
- 0–14 years: ▼17.1% (2012)
- 15–64 years: ▲71.0% (2011)
- 65 and over: ▲11.9% (2012)

Sex ratio
- Total: 1 male(s)/female (2004 est.)
- At birth: 1.08 male(s)/female (2012)
- Under 15: 1.08 male(s)/female (2004 est.)
- 15–64 years: 1.02 male(s)/female (2004 est.)
- 65 and over: 0.78 male(s)/female (2004 est.)

Nationality
- Nationality: Macedonian
- Major ethnic: ▼ Macedonians (58.44%)
- Minor ethnic: ▼ Albanians (24.30%); ▲ Turks (3.86%); ▼ Romanis (2.53%); ▼ Serbs (1.30%); ▲ Bosniaks (0.87%); ▼ Aromanians (0.47%); ▲ Other groups (8.23%)

Language
- Official: Macedonian and Albanian (co-official)
- Spoken: Macedonian (61.38%); Albanian (24.34%); Administrative sources (7.2%); Turkish (3.41%); Romani (1.73%); Bosnian (0.85%); Serbian (0.61%); Aromanian (0.17%); Other (0.15%)

Demographic features of the population of North Macedonia include population density, ethnicity, education level, health of the populace, economic status, religious affiliations and other aspects of the population.

== Total population ==
Year	Resident population	Growth rate	Population density per km^{2}
1921	808,724	—	31.5
1931	949,958	+17.46%	36.9
1948	1,152,986	+21.37%	44.8
1953	1,304,514	+13.14%	50.7
1961	1,406,003	+7.78%	54.7
1971	1,647,308	+17.16%	64.1
1981	1,909,136	+15.89%	74.2
1991	2,033,964	+6.54%	79.1
1994	1,945,932	−4.33%	75.7
2002	2,022,547	+3.94%	78.7
2021	1,836,713	−9.19%	71.4
Source: State Statistical Office, North Macedonia

View source data.
View source data.
View source data.

== International statistics and estimates ==
According to statistics from the European Union, the actual population has been reduced by at least 230,000 people who emigrated into European Union member states between 1998 and 2011. Further Albanian news sources estimated at October 2012 that the real population is closer to the sum of 1,744,237 people who are accounted within all of the health funds of the country. According to Bozhidar Dimitrov, the Bulgarian authorities have granted 87,000 to many of those emigrants a Bulgarian passport, as of 2012, which requires that they declare to be ethnic Bulgarians. Since Bulgaria's entry into the European Union, and under pressure from fellow European Union members, Bulgaria imposed more stringent rules and measures for the acquisition of a Bulgarian citizenship and passport.

The provisions of the Ohrid agreement to elevate any minority language if the minority in question is above 20% of the population of any municipality into a co-official language for that municipality has created friction within the government, and between officials of different political and ethnic interests, resulting in the indefinite postponement of the census for almost twenty years until it was finally conducted in 2021.

== Vital statistics ==
Source: State Statistical Office of the Republic of North Macedonia

Population Data for period 2003-2020 was revised by the Statistical Office of the Republic of North Macedonia

	Average population	Live births	Deaths	Natural change	Crude birth rate (per 1000)	Crude death rate (per 1000)	Natural change (per 1000)	Total fertility rate	Female fertile population (15–49 years)
1950	1,229,000	49,560	18,023	31,537	40.3	14.7	25.7	5.70	294,931
1951	1,262,000	45,329	20,747	24,582	35.9	16.4	19.5	5.14	301,089
1952	1,280,000	51,054	17,978	33,076	39.9	14.0	25.8	5.64	307,247
1953	1,310,000	49,665	19,312	30,353	37.9	14.7	23.2	5.26	313,405
1954	1,338,000	50,984	16,722	34,262	38.1	12.5	25.6	5.27	317,457
1955	1,355,000	49,093	17,919	31,174	36.2	13.2	23.0	4.95	321,509
1956	1,357,000	47,486	15,386	32,100	35.0	11.3	23.7	4.63	325,561
1957	1,364,000	46,107	17,341	28,766	33.8	12.7	21.1	4.21	341,923
1958	1,375,000	44,619	13,917	30,702	32.5	10.1	22.3	4.27	324,023
1959	1,382,000	44,638	14,998	29,640	32.3	10.9	21.4	4.21	326,697
1960	1,391,927	44,059	14,007	30,052	31.7	10.1	21.6	4.11	330,666
1961	1,408,302	42,182	13,141	29,041	30.0	9.3	20.6	3.87	334,636
1962	1,427,771	40,615	16,155	24,460	28.4	11.3	17.1	3.68	339,207
1963	1,449,932	41,284	13,229	28,055	28.5	9.1	19.3	3.70	346,815
1964	1,473,996	42,897	13,286	29,611	29.1	9.0	20.1	3.79	355,915
1965	1,499,729	42,433	12,758	29,675	28.3	8.5	19.8	3.67	364,762
1966	1,525,841	41,434	12,307	29,127	27.2	8.1	19.1	3.55	374,067
1967	1,550,453	40,763	12,523	28,240	26.3	8.1	18.2	3.44	385,649
1968	1,575,714	40,123	12,461	27,662	25.5	7.9	17.6	3.35	385,966
1969	1,602,993	40,342	13,111	27,231	25.2	8.2	17.0	3.24	407,438
1970	1,629,061	37,862	12,430	25,432	23.2	7.6	15.6	2.98	414,466
1971	1,647,308	37,904	12,447	25,457	22.9	7.5	15.4	2.93	421,227
1972	1,679,456	38,187	13,096	25,091	22.7	7.8	14.9	2.85	433,922
1973	1,704,602	37,478	12,217	25,261	22.0	7.2	14.8	2.72	441,858
1974	1,729,935	38,382	12,143	26,239	22.2	7.0	15.2	2.70	449,166
1975	1,756,335	39,579	12,629	26,950	22.5	7.2	15.3	2.70	459,158
1976	1,783,518	39,809	12,377	27,432	22.3	6.9	15.4	2.68	460,430
1977	1,810,148	38,932	12,899	26,033	21.5	7.1	14.4	2.54	471,191
1978	1,836,270	38,790	12,577	26,213	21.1	6.8	14.3	2.49	477,743
1979	1,863,728	39,407	12,653	26,754	21.1	6.8	14.4	2.49	485,717
1980	1,891,319	39,784	13,542	26,242	21.0	7.2	13.9	2.46	493,691
1981	1,909,136	39,488	13,383	26,105	20.6	7.0	13.6	2.48	491,236
1982	1,941,914	39,789	13,510	26,279	20.5	7.0	13.5	2.45	494,342
1983	1,967,556	39,210	14,391	24,819	19.9	7.3	12.6	2.40	506,961
1984	1,992,424	38,861	14,066	24,795	19.5	7.1	12.4	2.35	510,613
1985	2,016,942	38,722	14,408	24,314	19.2	7.1	12.1	2.32	516,226
1986	2,041,064	38,234	14,438	23,796	18.7	7.1	11.7	2.27	521,084
1987	2,065,005	38,572	14,644	23,928	18.7	7.1	11.6	2.27	529,021
1988	2,088,651	37,879	14,565	23,314	18.1	7.0	11.2	2.22	530,321
1989	2,070,912	35,927	14,592	21,335	17.3	7.0	10.3	2.09	538,168
1990	2,053,172	35,401	14,643	20,758	17.2	7.1	10.1	2.06	547,749
1991	2,033,964	34,830	14,789	20,041	17.1	7.3	9.8	2.30	512,254
1992	2,017,694	33,238	16,022	17,216	16.5	7.9	8.5	2.20	507,575
1993	1,999,955	32,374	15,591	16,783	16.2	7.8	8.4	2.15	502,896
1994	1,945,932	31,421	15,649	15,772	16.1	8.0	8.1	2.09	501,788
1995	1,966,033	29,886	16,169	13,717	15.2	8.2	7.0	1.98	505,349
1996	1,983,009	28,946	15,882	13,064	14.6	8.0	6.6	1.90	511,941
1997	1,996,869	26,830	16,373	10,457	13.4	8.2	5.2	1.75	517,392
1998	2,007,523	26,639	16,628	10,011	13.3	8.3	5.0	1.73	520,862
1999	2,017,142	24,964	16,622	8,342	12.4	8.2	4.1	1.61	523,687
2000	2,026,350	26,168	17,085	9,083	12.9	8.4	4.5	1.68	526,563
2001	2,034,882	24,183	16,790	7,393	11.9	8.3	3.6	1.55	529,374
2002	2,022,547	24,154	17,866	6,288	12.0	8.8	3.1	1.59	522,016
2003	2,022,725	23,596	17,813	5,783	11.7	8.8	2.9	1.55	523,044
2004	2,016,186	23,361	17,944	5,417	11.6	8.9	2.7	1.54	520,696
2005	2,005,330	22,482	18,406	4,076	11.2	9.2	2.0	1.49	516,960
2006	1,994,287	22,585	18,630	3,955	11.3	9.3	2.0	1.51	513,243
2007	1,982,933	22,688	19,594	3,094	11.4	9.9	1.6	1.53	509,072
2008	1,971,493	22,945	18,982	3,963	11.6	9.6	2.0	1.56	504,139
2009	1,958,782	23,684	19,060	4,624	12.1	9.7	2.4	1.63	498,130
2010	1,946,298	24,296	19,113	5,183	12.5	9.8	2.7	1.70	490,751
2011	1,937,398	22,770	19,465	3,305	11.8	10.0	1.7	1.62	483,441
2012	1,929,821	23,568	20,134	3,434	12.2	10.4	1.8	1.71	476,635
2013	1,922,716	23,138	19,208	3,930	12.0	10.0	2.0	1.70	469,371
2014	1,917,557	23,596	19,718	3,878	12.3	10.3	2.0	1.76	461,769
2015	1,912,430	23,075	20,461	2,614	12.1	10.7	1.4	1.76	454,398
2016	1,906,313	23,002	20,421	2,581	12.1	10.7	1.4	1.78	447,443
2017	1,898,657	21,754	20,318	1,436	11.5	10.7	0.8	1.72	440,271
2018	1,889,051	21,333	19,727	1,606	11.3	10.4	0.9	1.73	432,640
2019	1,876,262	19,845	20,446	−601	10.6	10.9	−0.3	1.65	424,658
2020	1,856,124	19,031	25,755	−6,724	10.3	13.9	−3.6	1.62	416,741
2021	1,836,713	18,648	28,516	−9,868	10.2	15.5	−5.4	1.62	410,912
2022	1,830,083	18,073	22,459	−4,386	9.9	12.3	−2.4	1.59	407,934
2023	1,826,633	16,737	20,187	−3,450	9.2	11.0	−1.9	1.48	404,624
2024	1,822,612	16,061	20,201	−4,140	8.8	11.1	−2.3	1.44	401,834
2025	1,819,074	15,850	20,287	−4,437				1.42 (e)	
2026								1.40 (e)	

=== Current vital statistics ===
Life expectancy in North Macedonia since 1950

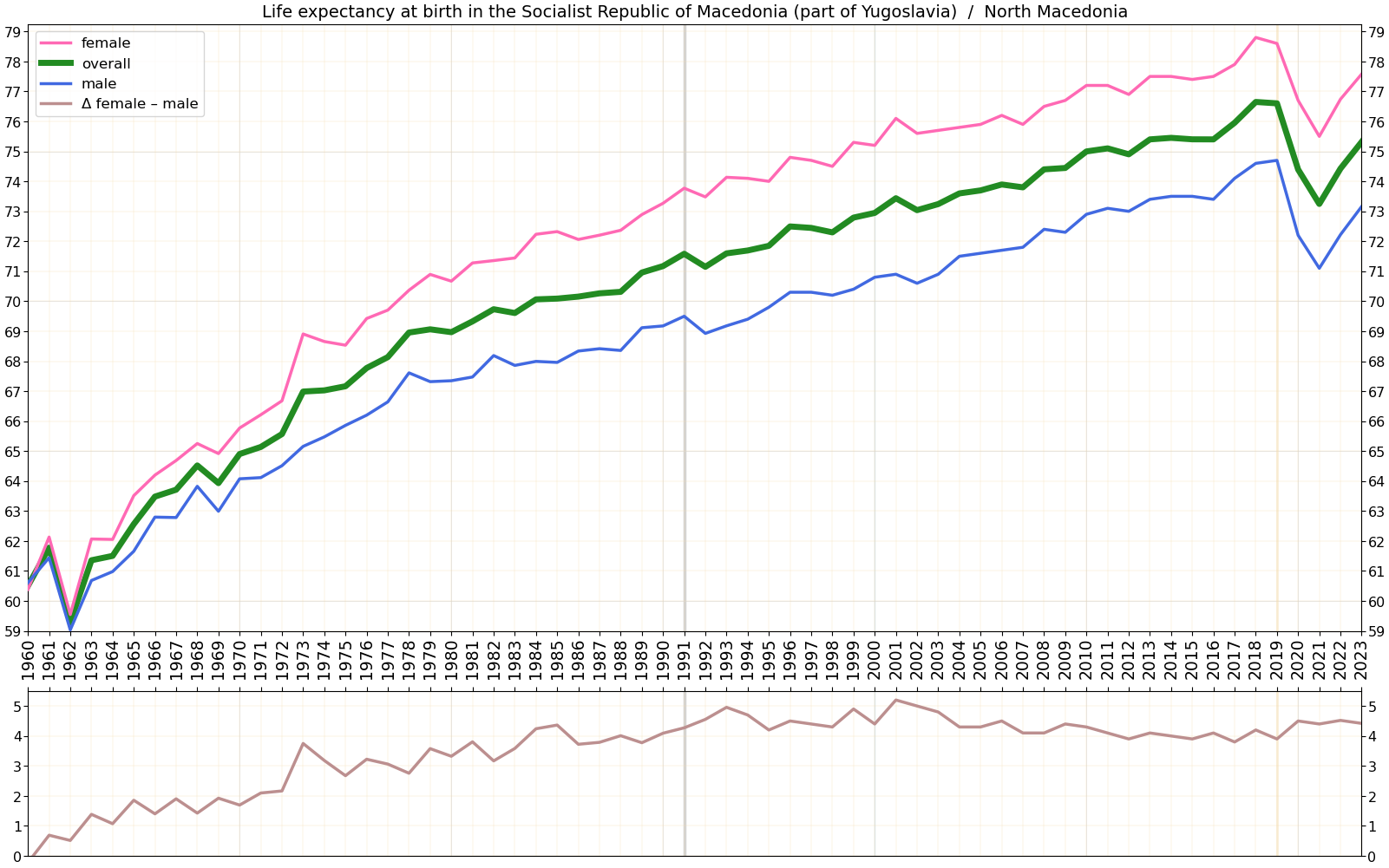
Life expectancy in North Macedonia since 1960 by gender

Period	Live births	Deaths	Natural increase
January-June 2025	7,322	10,113	–2,791
January-June 2026	7,187	10,031	–2,844
Difference	▼ –135 (-1.8%)	▼ –82 (-0.8%)	▼ –53

== Marriages and divorces ==
	Average population	Marriages	Divorces	Crude marriage rate (per 1000)	Crude divorce rate (per 1000)	Divorces per 1000 marriages
1950	1,229,000	14,123	983	11.5	0.8	69.6
1951	1,262,000	13,651	951	10.8	0.8	69.7
1952	1,280,000	12,758	832	10.0	0.7	65.2
1953	1,310,000	11,739	990	9.0	0.8	84.3
1954	1,338,000	12,096	772	9.0	0.6	63.8
1955	1,355,000	12,003	983	8.9	0.7	81.9
1956	1,357,000	11,751	956	8.7	0.7	81.4
1957	1,364,000	11,432	1,079	8.4	0.8	94.4
1958	1,375,000	12,238	970	8.9	0.7	79.3
1959	1,382,000	11,846	1,013	8.6	0.7	85.5
1960	1,391,927	11,941	1,013	8.6	0.7	84.8
1961	1,408,302	11,881	796	8.4	0.6	67.0
1962	1,427,771	11,941	907	8.4	0.6	76.0
1963	1,449,932	11,827	685	8.2	0.5	57.9
1964	1,473,996	13,472	610	9.1	0.4	45.3
1965	1,499,729	13,467	754	9.0	0.5	56.0
1966	1,525,841	12,960	598	8.5	0.4	46.1
1967	1,550,453	13,141	392	8.5	0.3	29.8
1968	1,575,714	13,550	446	8.6	0.3	32.9
1969	1,602,993	14,376	448	9.0	0.3	31.2
1970	1,629,061	14,593	453	9.0	0.3	31.0
1971	1,654,076	14,739	463	8.9	0.3	31.4
1972	1,679,456	14,903	580	8.9	0.3	38.9
1973	1,704,602	15,105	1,053	8.9	0.6	69.7
1974	1,729,935	15,118	1,071	8.7	0.6	70.8
1975	1,756,335	15,554	1,270	8.9	0.7	81.7
1976	1,783,518	15,023	1,066	8.4	0.6	71.0
1977	1,810,148	15,604	822	8.6	0.5	52.7
1978	1,836,270	15,702	776	8.6	0.4	49.4
1979	1,863,728	16,122	816	8.7	0.4	50.6
1980	1,891,319	16,145	890	8.5	0.5	55.1
1981	1,916,713	16,303	911	8.5	0.5	55.9
1982	1,941,914	16,606	911	8.6	0.5	54.9
1983	1,967,556	16,404	747	8.3	0.4	45.5
1984	1,992,424	16,054	886	8.1	0.4	55.2
1985	2,016,942	16,335	817	8.1	0.4	50.0
1986	2,041,064	16,326	1,017	8.0	0.5	62.3
1987	2,065,005	16,799	811	8.1	0.4	48.3
1988	2,088,651	16,380	861	7.8	0.4	52.6
1989	2,070,912	15,842	951	7.6	0.5	60.0
1990	2,053,172	15,688	749	7.6	0.4	47.7
1991	2,035,433	15,311	496	7.5	0.2	32.4
1992	2,017,694	15,354	578	7.6	0.3	37.6
1993	1,999,955	15,080	636	7.5	0.3	42.2
1994	1,982,215	15,736	612	7.9	0.3	38.9
1995	1,964,476	15,823	710	8.1	0.4	44.9
1996	1,981,543	14,089	705	7.1	0.4	50.0
1997	1,996,869	14,072	1,021	7.0	0.5	72.6
1998	2,007,523	13,993	1,027	7.0	0.5	73.4
1999	2,017,142	14,172	1,045	7.0	0.5	73.7
2000	2,026,350	14,255	1,325	7.0	0.7	92.9
2001	2,034,882	13,267	1,448	6.5	0.7	109.1
2002	2,020,157	14,522	1,310	7.2	0.6	90.2
2003	2,026,773	14,402	1,405	7.1	0.7	97.6
2004	2,032,544	14,073	1,645	6.9	0.8	116.9
2005	2,036,855	14,500	1,552	7.1	0.8	107.0
2006	2,040,228	14,908	1,475	7.3	0.7	98.9
2007	2,043,559	15,490	1,417	7.6	0.7	91.5
2008	2,046,898	14,695	1,209	7.2	0.6	82.3
2009	2,050,671	14,923	1,287	7.3	0.6	86.2
2010	2,055,004	14,155	1,720	6.9	0.8	121.5
2011	2,058,539	14,736	1,753	7.2	0.9	119.0
2012	2,061,044	13,991	1,926	6.8	0.9	137.7
2013	2,064,032	13,982	2,045	6.8	1.0	146.3
2014	2,067,471	13,813	2,210	6.7	1.1	160.0
2015	2,070,226	14,186	2,200	6.9	1.1	155.1
2016	2,072,490	13,199	1,985	6.4	1.0	150.4
2017	2,074,502	13,781	1,994	6.6	1.0	144.7
2018	2,076,217	13,494	1,620	6.5	0.8	120.1
2019	2,076,694	13,814	1,990	6.7	1.0	144.1

== Ethnic groups ==
The process of industrialization and urbanization after the Second World War that caused the population growth to decrease involved the ethnic Macedonians to a greater extent than Muslims. Rates of increase were very high among rural Muslims: Turks and Torbesh (Macedonian Muslims) had rates 2.5 times those of the Macedonian majority, while Roma had rates 3 times as high. In 1994, Macedonians had a TFR of 2.07, while the TFR of others were: Albanian (2.10), Turkish (3.55), Roma (4.01), Serb (2.07), Vlachs (1.88) and Others (3.05). The TFR by religions was: Christian (2.17, with 2.20 for Catholics and 2.06 for Orthodox), Islam (4.02) and others (2.16).

However, it is unlikely that this high minority TFR has continued since then in North Macedonia, as Balkan fertility elsewhere (Albania, Bosnia and Herzegovina, Kosovo) has dropped sharply toward the European average. A more recent survey pegs Muslim fertility in North Macedonia at 1.7, versus 1.5 for non-Muslims.

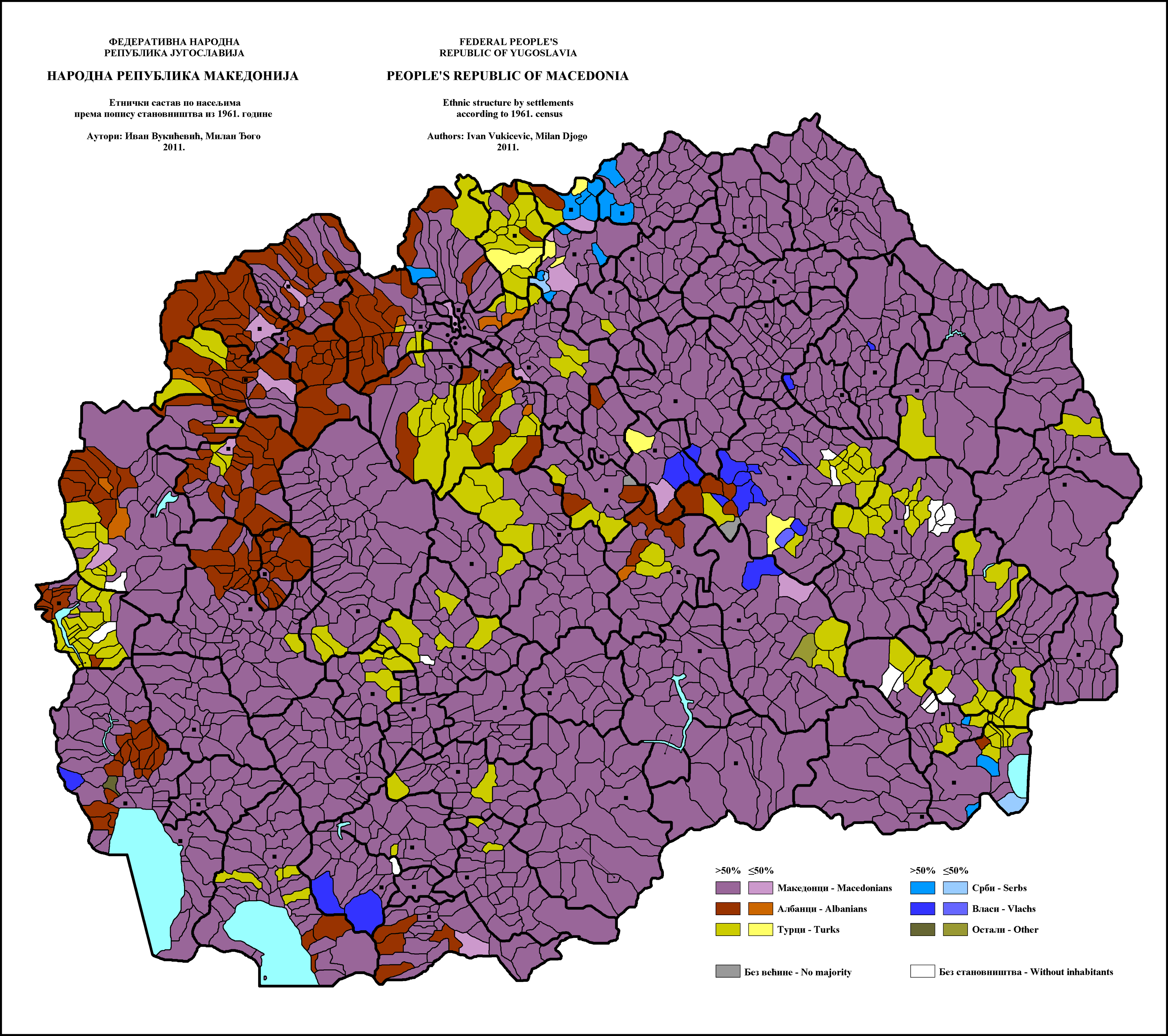
Ethnic structure of SR Macedonia by settlements 1961.

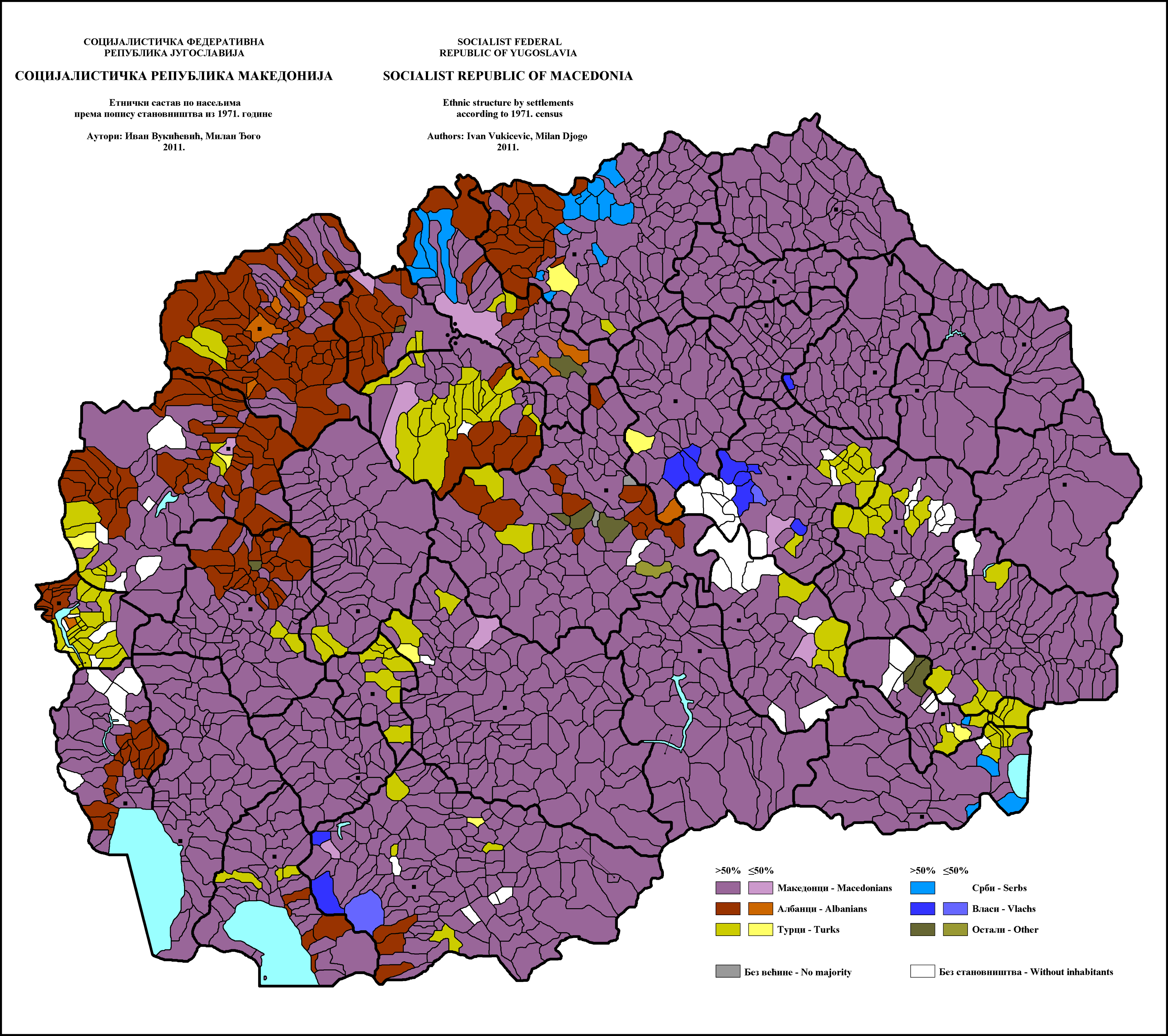
Ethnic structure of SR Macedonia by settlements 1971.

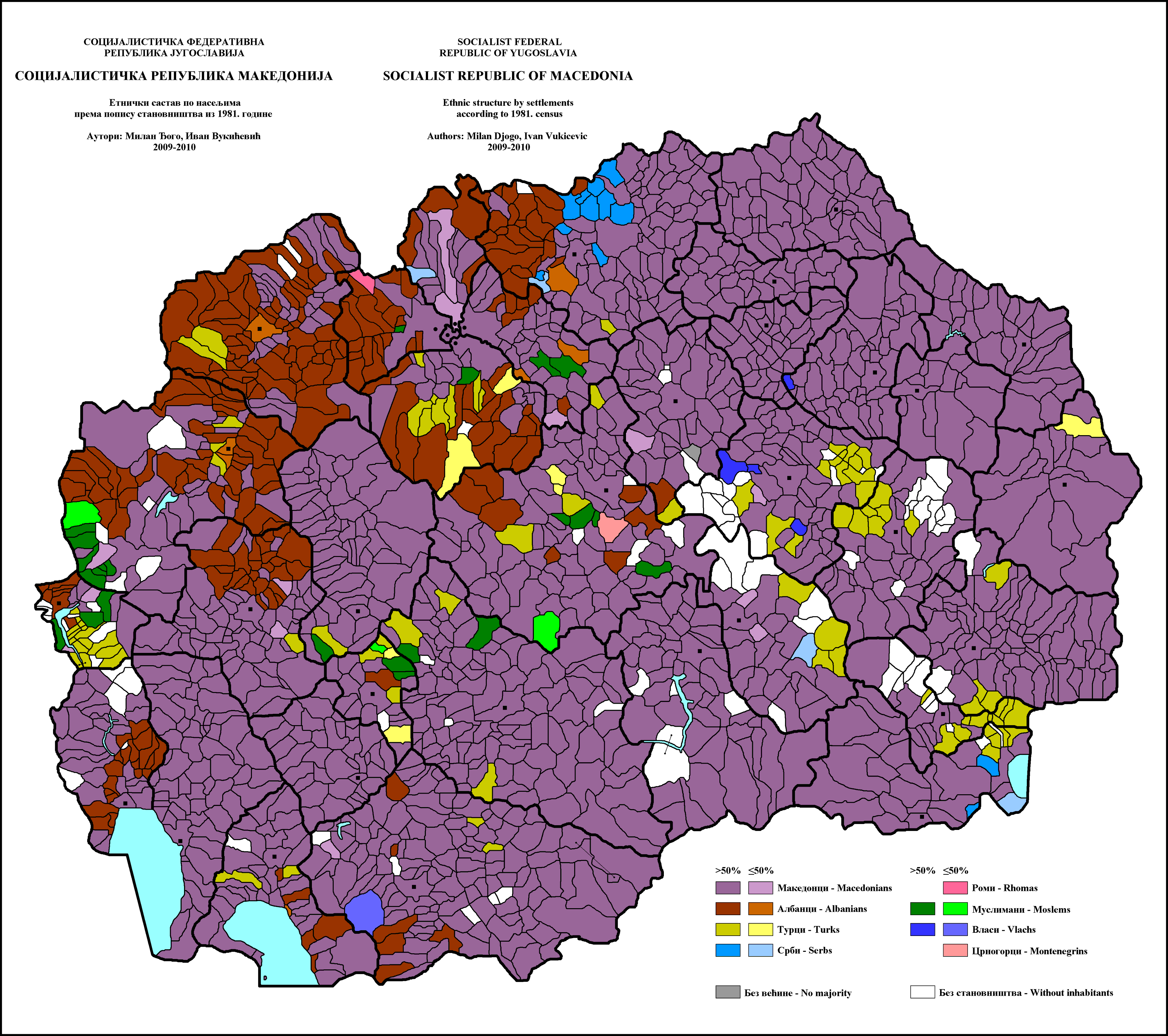
Ethnic structure of SR Macedonia by settlements 1981.

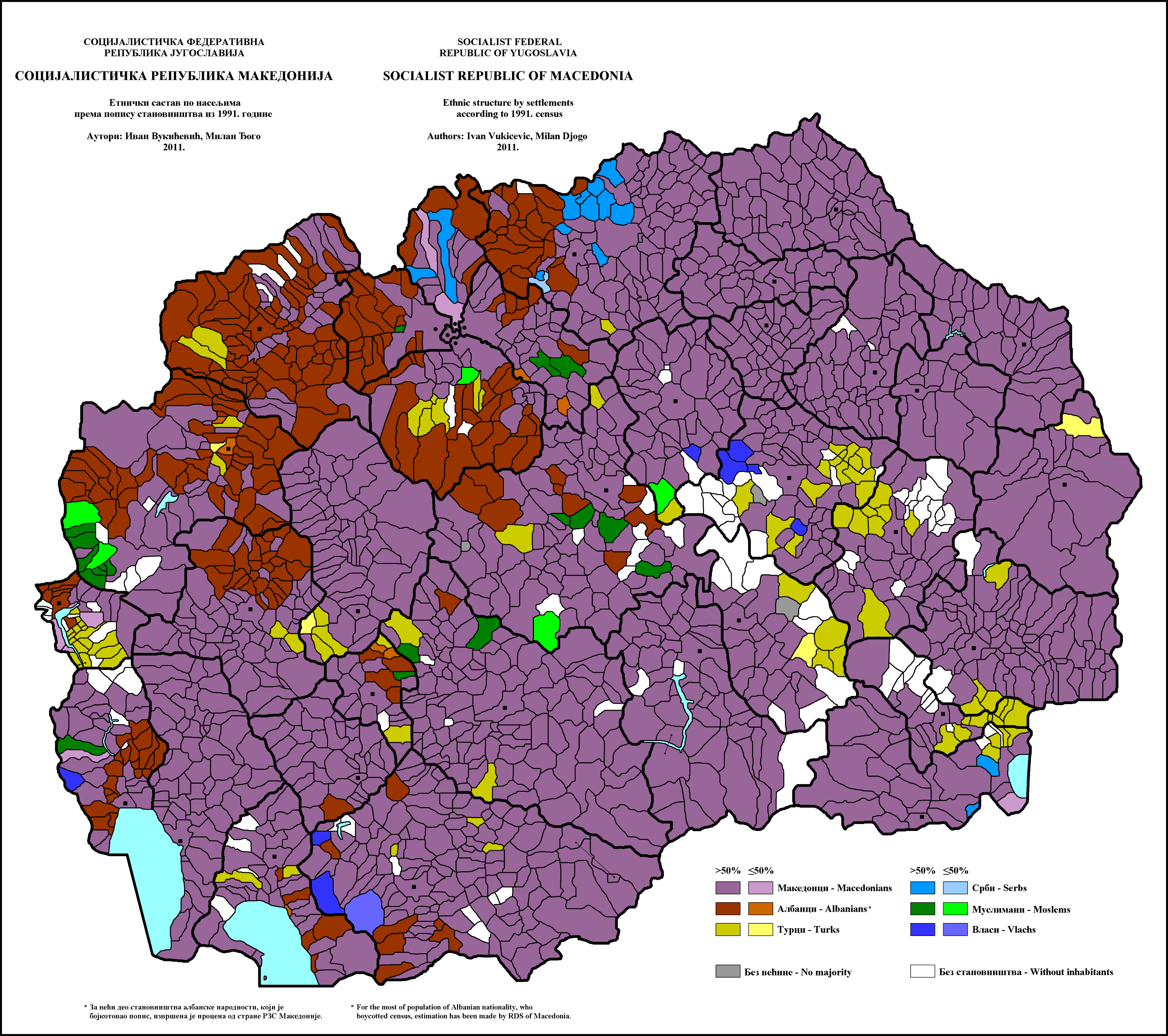
Ethnic structure of SR Macedonia by settlements 1991.

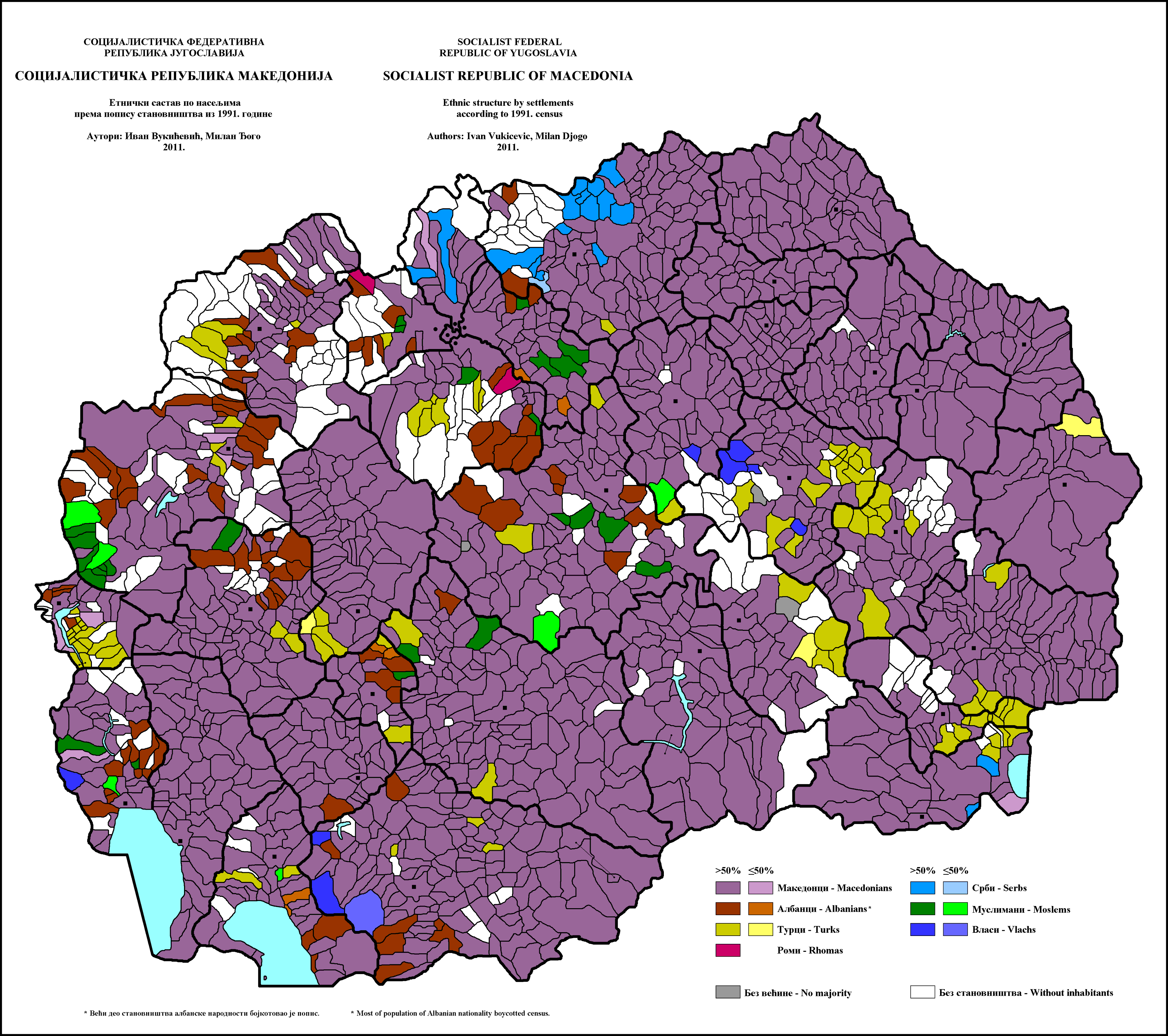
Ethnic structure of SR Macedonia by settlements 1991.

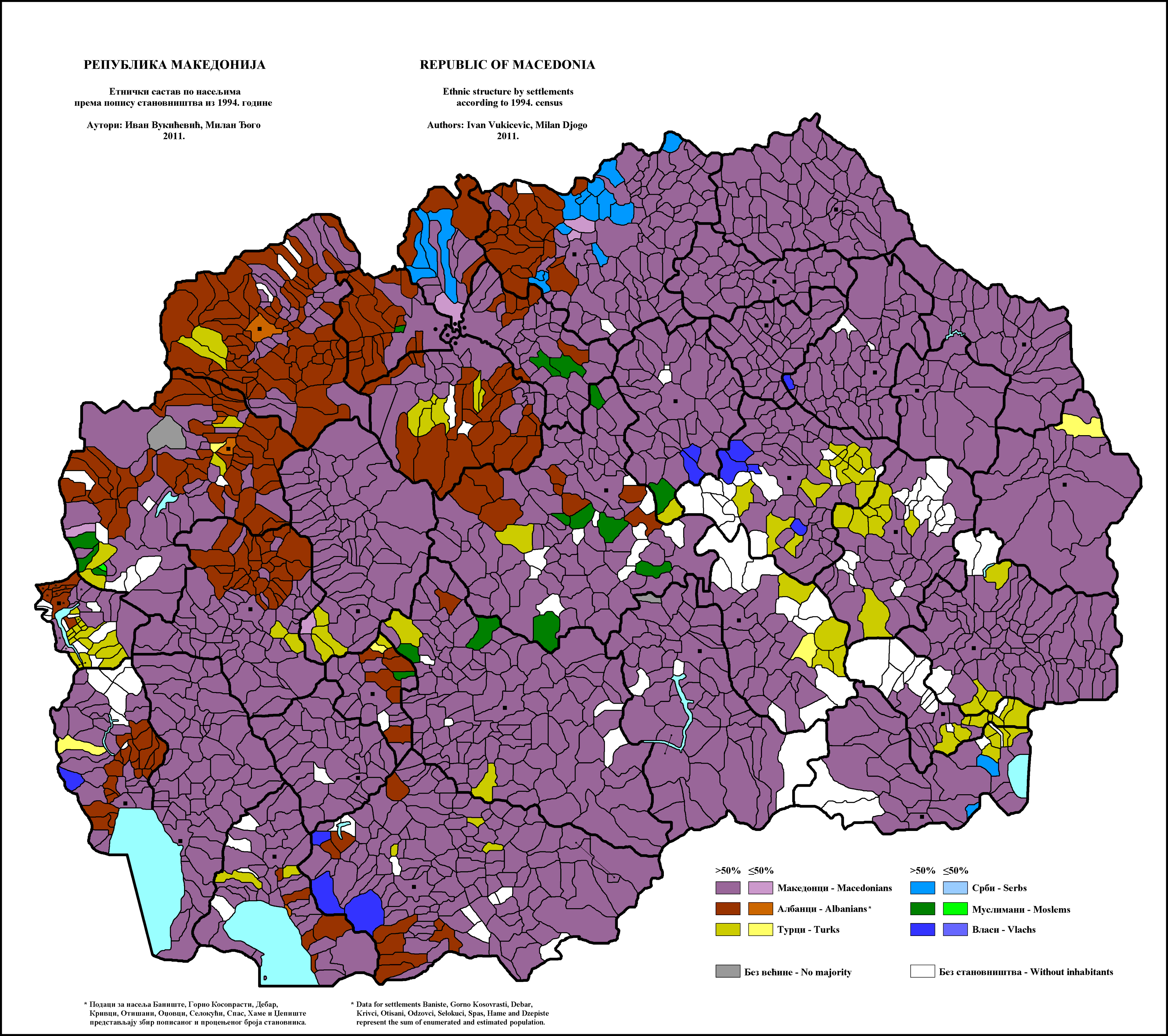
Ethnic structure of R. Macedonia by settlements 1994.

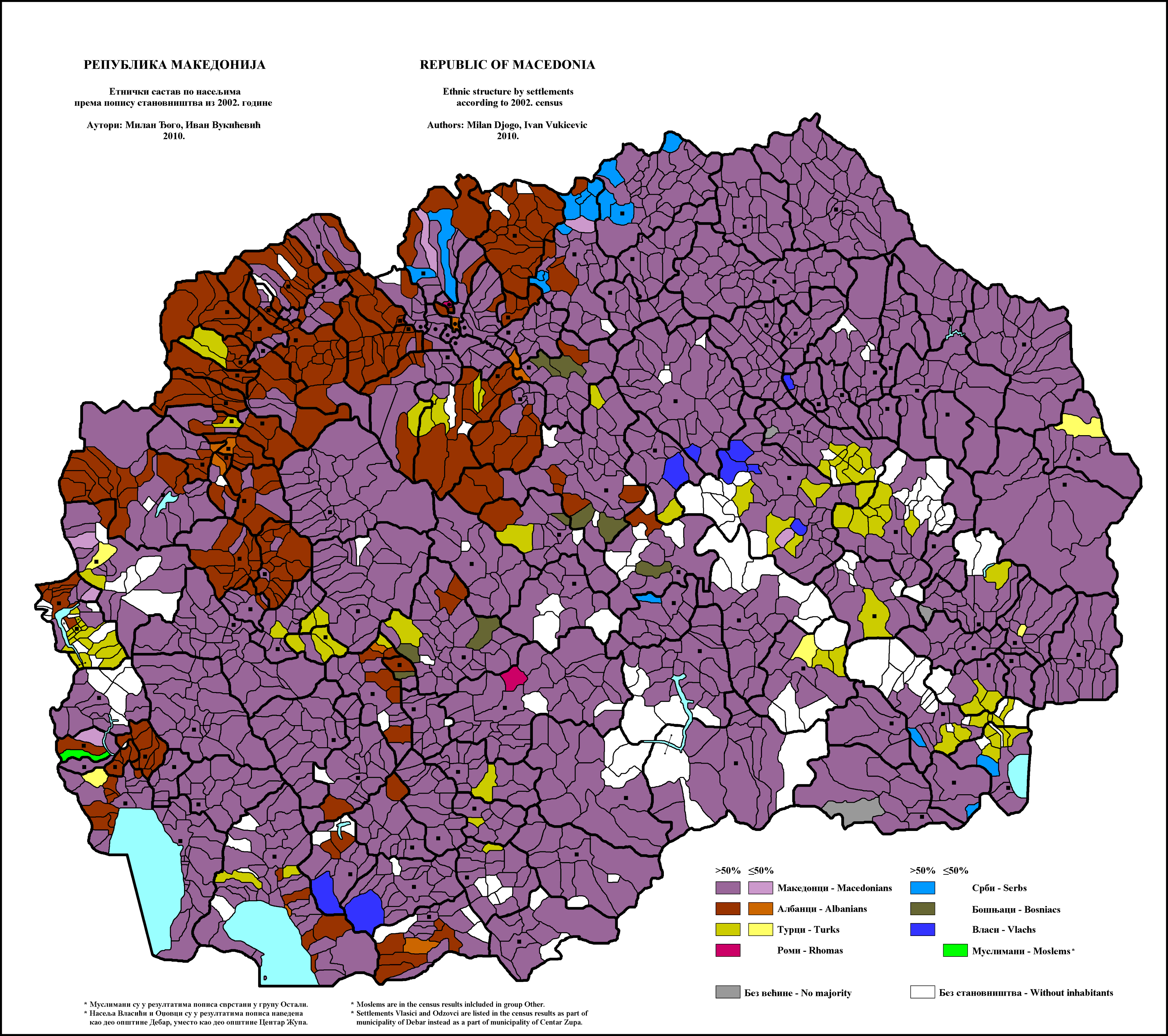
Ethnic structure of R. Macedonia by settlements 2002.

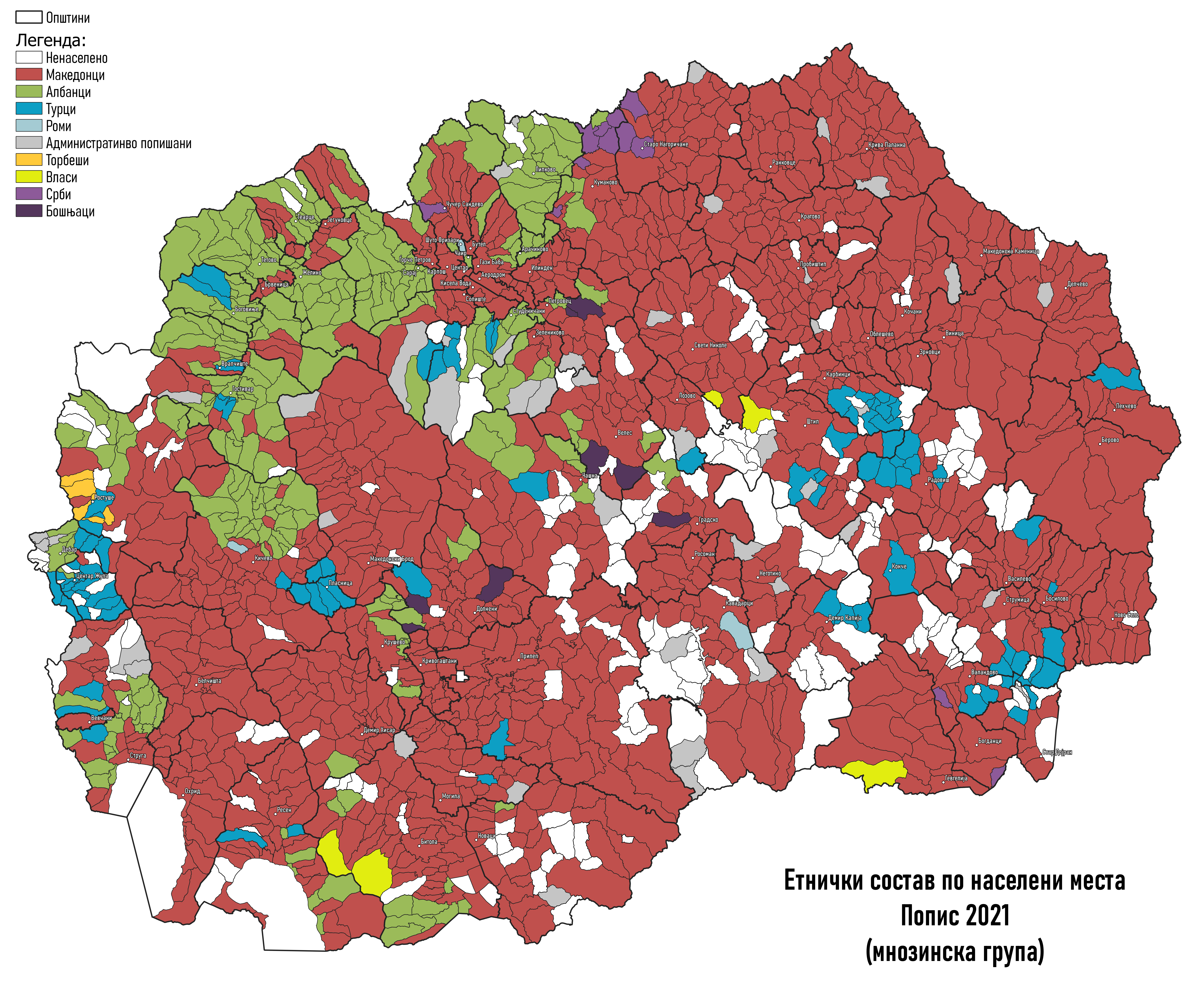
Ethnic structure of R. North Macedonia by settlements 2021.

Population of North Macedonia according to ethnic group 1948–2021
Ethnic group	census 1948		census 1953		census 1961		census 1971		census 1981		census 1991		census 1994^{1}		census 2002		census 2021	
Ethnic group	Number	%	Number	%	Number	%	Number	%	Number	%	Number	%	Number	%	Number	%	Number	%
Macedonians	789,648	68.5	860,699	66.0	1,000,854	71.2	1,142,375	69.3	1,281,195	67.0	1,328,187	65.3	1,295,964	66.6	1,297,981	64.18	1,073,299	58.44
Albanians	197,389	17.1	162,524	12.5	183,108	13.0	279,871	17.0	377,726	19.8	441,987	21.7	441,104	22.7	509,083	25.17	446,245	24.30
Turks	95,940	8.3	203,938	15.6	131,481	9.4	108,552	6.6	86,691	4.5	77,080	3.8	78,019	4.0	77,959	3.85	70,961	3.86
Romani	19,500	1.7	20,462	1.6	20,606	1.5	24,505	1.5	43,223	2.3	52,103	2.6	43,707	2.2	53,879	2.66	46,433	2.53
Serbs	29,721	2.6	35,112	2.7	42,728	3.0	46,465	2.8	44,613	2.3	42,775	2.1	40,228	2.1	35,939	1.78	23,847	1.30
Bosniaks													6,829	0.3	17,018	0.84	16,042	0.87
Aromanians	9,511	0.8	8,668	0.7	8,046	0.6	7,190	0.4	6,392	0.3	7,764	0.4	8,601	0.4	9,695	0.48	8,714	0.47
Torbeši																	4,174	0.23
Bulgarians	889	0.1	920	0.1	3,087	0.2	3,334	0.2	1,984	0.1	1,370	0.1	1,682	0.1	1,417	0.07	3,504	0.19
Ashkali																	2,406	0.13
Croats	2,090	0.2	2,770	0.2	3,801	0.3	3,882	0.2	3,349	0.2	2,878	0.1	2,248	0.1	2,686	0.13	2,145	0.12
Muslims	1,560	0.1	1,591	0.1	3,002	0.2	1,248	0.1	39,555	2.1	31,356	1.5	15,418	0.8	2,553	0.13	1,187	0.06
Montenegrins	2,348	0.2	2,526	0.2	3,414	0.2	3,246	0.2	3,940	0.2	3,225	0.1	2,318	0.1	2,003	0.10	1,023	0.06
Yugoslavs					1,260	0.1	3,652	0.2	14,240	0.7							344	0.02
other/unspecified	4,390	0.4	5,304	0.4	4,616	0.3	22,988	1.4	6,228	0.3	45,239	2.2	9,814	0.5	14,887^{2}	0.74	136,389^{3}	7.42
Total	1,152,986		1,304,514		1,406,003		1,647,308		1,909,136		2,033,964		1,945,932		2,022,547		1,836,713	
^{1} Since 1994 residents who were permanently living abroad were no longer included^{2} Ashkali: 3,713 or 0.184%, Greeks: 422 or 0.021%, Russians: 368 or 0.018%, Slovenes: 365 or 0.018%, Poles: 162 or 0.008%, Ukrainians: 136 or 0.007%, Germans: 88 or 0.004%, Czechs: 60 or 0.005%, Slovaks: 60 or 0.005%, Jews: 53 or 0.003%, Italians: 46 or 0.002%, Austrians: 35 or 0.002%, Rusyns: 24 or 0.001%, Regionally affiliated: 829 or 0.041%, Non-declared: 404 or 0.02%, Others: 5332 or 0.264%^{3} Regionally affiliated: 110 or 0.01%, Non-declared: 450* or 0.02%, Citizens for whom the data are taken from administrative sources, not included directly in the census (without ethnic declaration) 132,260 or 7.20%.*

In 2017, 21,754 children were born in North Macedonia. The ethnic affiliation of these newborns was: 11,260 (51.76%) Macedonian; 7,404 (34.03%) Albanian; 940 (4.32%) Turkish; 1,276 (5.87%) Roma; 40 (0.18%) Vlach; 129 (0.59%) Serbian; 213 (0.98%) Bosniaks; 492 (2.26%) other ethnic affiliation and unknown. In the school year 2016/2017 there were 192 715 students in elementary schools from which 104,756 (55%) were Macedonian, and 60,971 (32%) were Albanian, and in High schools there were 72 482 students from which 43,658 (60.1%) were Macedonian and 22 419 (30.9%) were Albanians. Furthermore, in 1999 Albanians accounted for 34.6% of newborns and 26.1% of students who finished high school in 2016, which was regulated by the Ministry of Education.

Newborns in North Macedonia according to ethnic group
Ethnic group	1994		2002		2012		2021		2022		2023		2024	
Ethnic group	Number	%	Number	%	Number	%	Number	%	Number	%	Number	%	Number	%
Macedonians	16,704	49.88	13,639	49.13	11,995	50.90	9,338	50.08	9,102	50.36	8,411	50.25	6,842	42.60
Albanians	12,010	35.86	10,118	36.45	8,035	34.09	6,663	35.73	6,577	36.39	6,063	36.23	5,475	34.09
Romani	1,378	4.12	1,678	6.04	1,552	6.59	1,267	6.79	1,094	6.05	997	5.96	917	5.71
Turks	1,616	4.83	1,202	4.33	1,092	4.63	835	4.48	756	4.18	735	4.39	602	3.75
Bosniaks					251	1.07	177	0.95	186	1.03	179	1.07	150	0.93
Serbs	403	1.20	168	0.61	125	0.53	123	0.66	117	0.65	109	0.65	84	0.52
Vlach (Aromanians)	25	0.07	23	0.08	37	0.16	17	0.09	26	0.14	31	0.19	15	0.09
other	1,351	4.03	933	3.36	481	2.04	228	1.22	215	1.19	212	1.26	161	1.00
unspecified	1,351	4.03	933	3.36	481	2.04	228	1.22	215	1.19	212	1.26	1,815	11.30
Total	33,487		27,761		23,568		18,648		18,073		16,737		16,061	

== Migration ==
Net migration of North Macedonia (2005–2023)
Year	Immigrants	Emigrants	Net migration
2005	967	18	191
2006	1,029	35	466
2007	861	16	987
2008	557	11	25
2009	1,000	23	467
2010	1,356	84	652
2011	1,747	147	806
2012	2,072	85	1,053
2013	1,940	96	1,390
2014	2,273	99	1,699
2015	3,617	249	2,860
2016	2,481	190	2,134
2017	2,322	283	2,201
2018	2,557	233	2,549
2019	2,811	186	2,349
2020	1,643	145	766
2021	2,629	182	1,532
2022	3,384	469	1,381
2023	2,654	343	799
2024	6,946	235	5,747

== Languages ==
Language, census 2021	Number	%
Total	1,836,713	100.00%
Macedonian	1,127,394	61.38%
Albanian	447,001	24.34%
Turkish	62,723	3.41%
Romani	31,721	1.73%
Vlach	3,151	0.17%
Serbian	11,252	0.61%
Bosnian	15,615	0.85%
Bulgarian	1,519	0.08%
Croatian	958	0.05%
Other languages	2,717	0.15%
Unknown	402	0.02%
Persons for whom data are taken from administrative sources	132,260	7.20%

== Religion ==
Religion, census 2021	Number	%
Total Christians	1,109,908	60.43%
Orthodox	847,390	46.14%
Christians (unspecified)	242,579	13.21%
Evangelical Protestant Christians	8,764	0.48%
Catholics	6,746	0.37%
Protestants	1,313	0.07%
Jehovah's Witnesses	1,137	0.06%
Evangelical Methodists	889	0.05%
Evangelists	678	0.04%
Adventists	371	0.02%
Baptists	70	0.00%
Reformists	50	0.00%
Islam	590,878	32.17%
Buddhists	894	0.05%
Hare Krishna	96	0.01%
Members of the Jewish (Moses) community	74	0.00%
Members of an unlisted religion	113	0.01%
Non-believers (atheists)	8,764	0.48%
Undeclared	16	0.00%
Unknown	76	0.00%
Agnostics	1,964	0.11%
Persons for whom data are taken from administrative sources	132,260	7.20%
Total population	1,836,713	100.00%

== CIA World Factbook demographic statistics ==
The following demographic statistics are from the CIA World Factbook, unless otherwise indicated.

=== Age structure ===
- 0–14 years: 19.5% (male 210,078; female 203,106)
- 15–64 years: 67.8% (male 707,298; female 696,830)
- 65 years and over: 12.7% (male 97,437; female 124,661) (2004 est)

=== Sex ratio ===
- at birth: 1.08 male(s)/female
- under 15 years: 1.08 male(s)/female
- 15–64 years: 1.02 male(s)/female
- 65 years and over: 0.78 male(s)/female
- total population: 1 male(s)/female (2004 est.)

=== Infant mortality rate ===
- total: 11.74 deaths/1,000 live births
- female: 10.73 deaths/1,000 live births (2004 est.)
- male: 12.67 deaths/1,000 live births

=== Life expectancy at birth ===
- total population: 74.73 years
- male: 72.45 years
- female: 77.2 years (2004 est.)

=== Total fertility rate ===
- 1.50 children born/woman (2015 est.)

=== HIV/AIDS ===
- adult prevalence rate: less than 0.1% (2001 est.)
- people living with HIV/AIDS: less than 100 (1999 est.)
- deaths: less than 100 (2001 est.)

=== Nationality ===
- noun: Macedonian/citizen of the Republic of North Macedonia
- adjective: Macedonian / of North Macedonia

== See also ==
- Demographic history of North Macedonia
- Rumelia
- Yugoslavia § Demographics
  - Demographics of the Kingdom of Yugoslavia
  - Demographics of the Socialist Federal Republic of Yugoslavia
- Demographics of Albania
- Demographics of Bulgaria
- Demographics of Greece
- Demographics of Kosovo
- Demographics of Serbia

== Other sources ==
- Statistical Yearbook of the Republic of Macedonia 2004 (CD version)
