= Mile Stojkoski =

Macedonian athlete and humanitarian (born 1965)

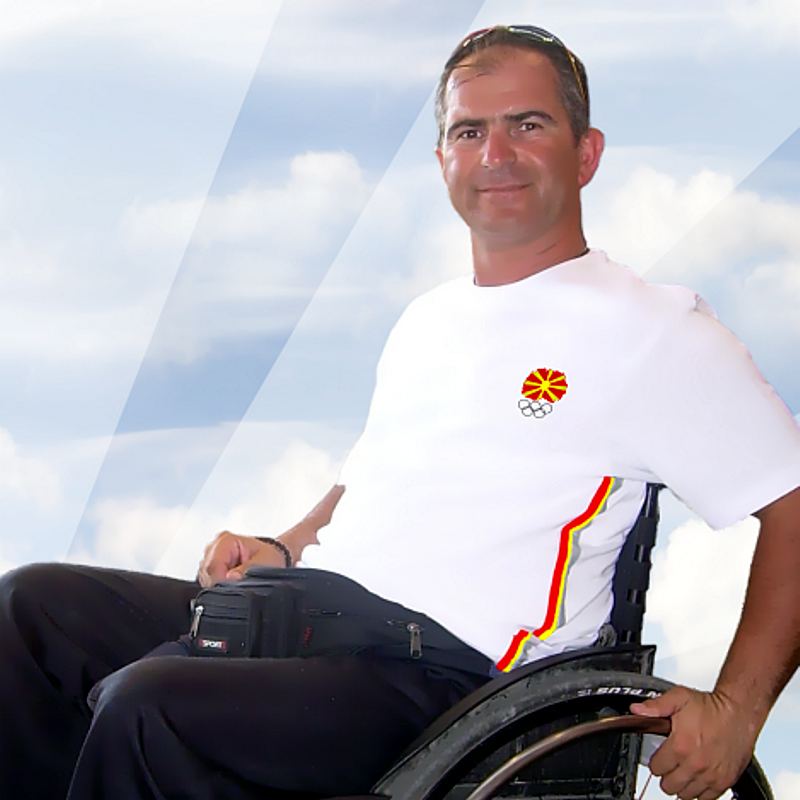
- Stojkoski in 2007

Personal information
- Nationality: Macedonian
- Born: 4 May 1965 (age 61) Prilep, Macedonia (North Macedonia)
- Website: www.milestojkoski.com

Sport
- Sport: Ultramarathon

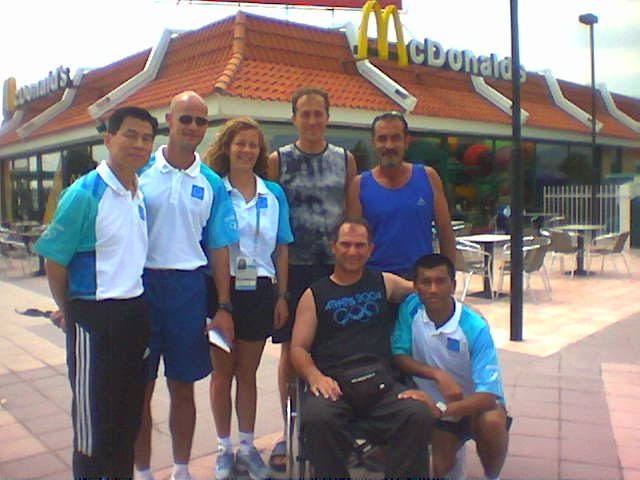
At the Athens Olympic Games in 2004

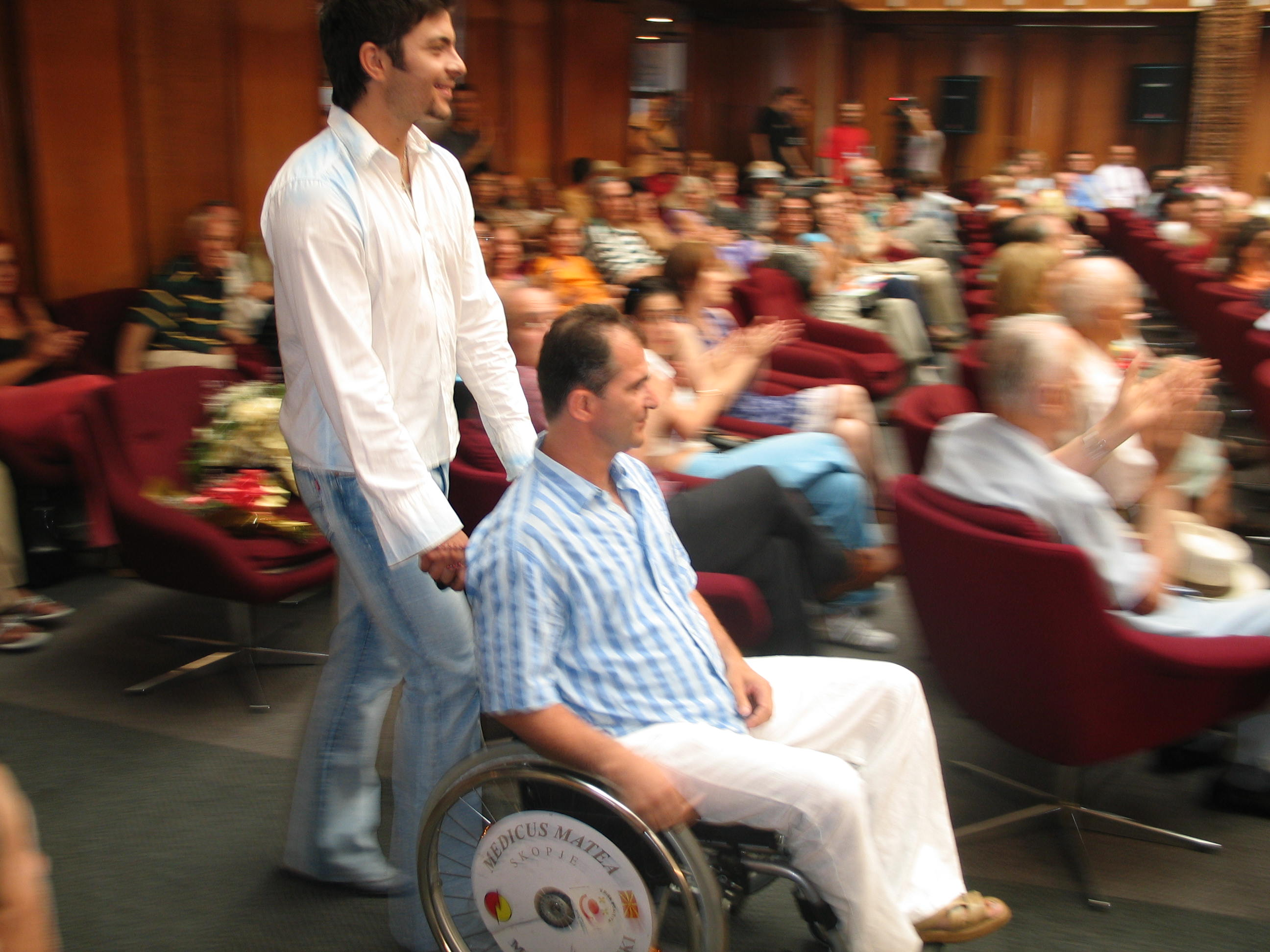
With Toše Proeski in 2004.

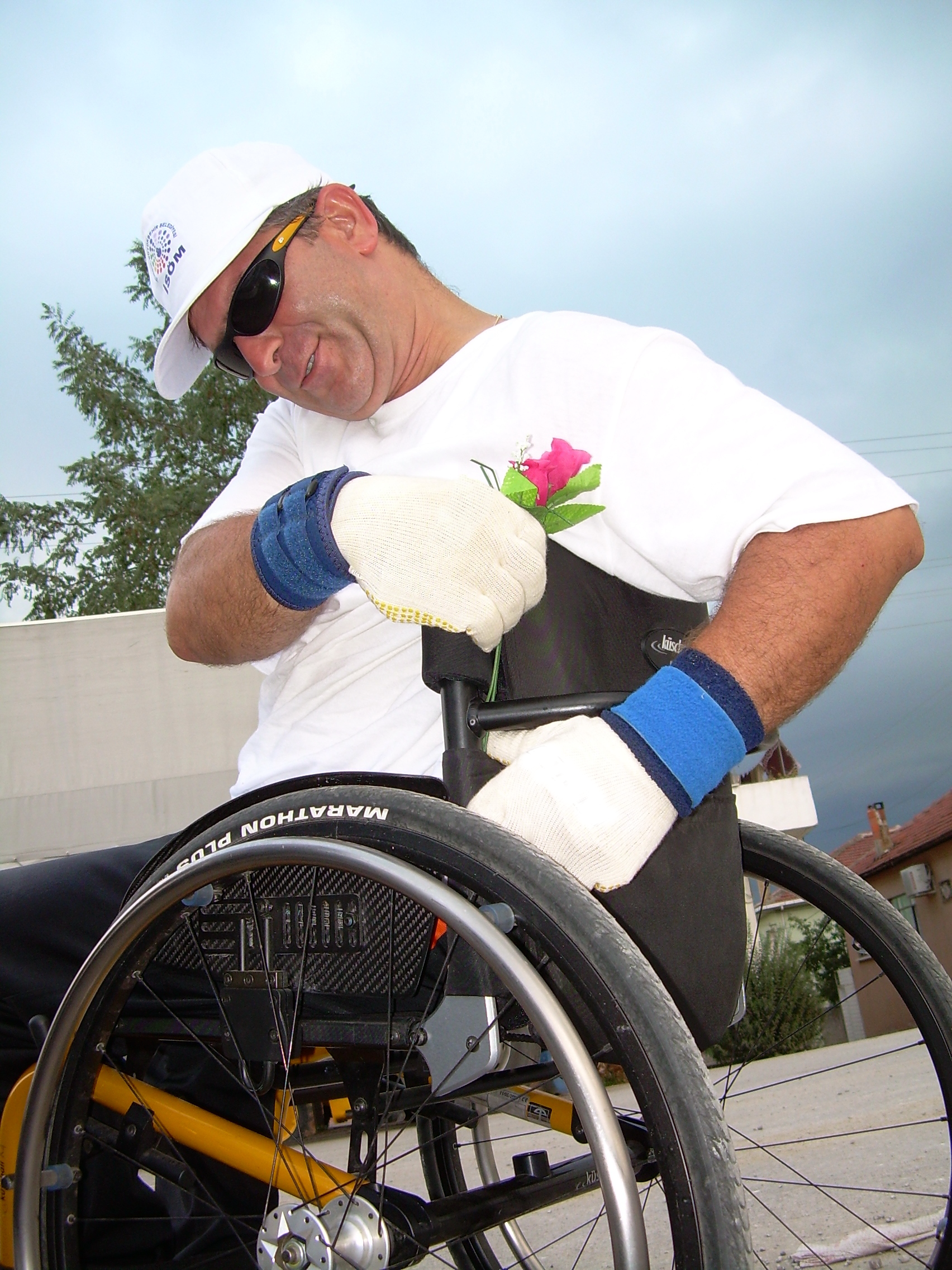
During his marathon to Beijing in 2007

With Adrian Newey and Roberto Carlos at Istanbul Park in 2007

HRH Prince Michael and Mile Stojkoski in 2012

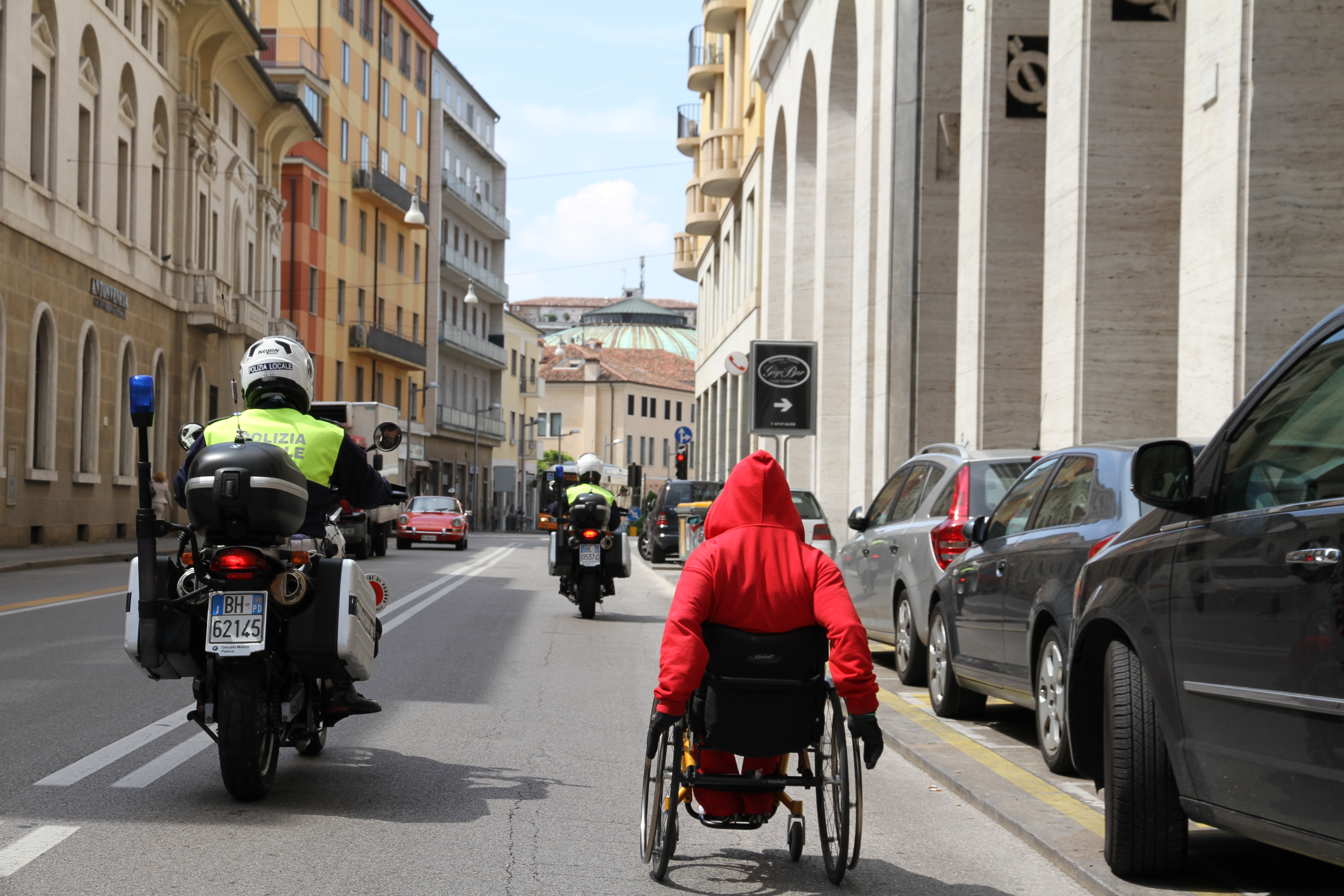
In Vicenza, Italy during his ultramarathon towards 2012 London Olympic and Paralympic Games.

Mile Stojkoski (Macedonian: Миле Стојкоски; born 4 May 1965), is a Macedonian athlete and humanitarian known for going on long-distance marathon runs (ultramarathons) in his wheelchair preceding the Summer Olympic Games. In 1996 he experienced a spinal cord injury from a motorcycle accident leaving him paraplegic, losing use of both his legs. After much emotional struggle and learning about living with his disability he got involved in sports and humanitarian nonprofit organizations. This eventually led him to focus on ultramarathons in his wheelchair with primary goal to raise public awareness and funds in support of people with disabilities in Macedonia. Since 2004 he has gone on nine marathons (4 ultramarathons) gaining public recognition and awards. On 15 March 2012 he started his 10th marathon from Kruševo, Macedonia heading for the 2012 London Summer Olympics.

== Biography ==
Stojkoski was born in Prilep, Macedonia where he received his college degree in economics, resulting with his employment at the Public Communal Enterprise (PCE) Komunalec - Prilep. To be more efficient at his job he used a small motorcycle while working on a day-to-day basis. On 8 September 1996 (Independence Day holiday in Macedonia), Stojkoski was hit by a car while driving his scooter and was immediately rushed to Prilep General Hospital. After receiving primary care he was sent to St. Erazmo Special Hospital for Orthopedic Surgery and Traumatology in Ohrid, Macedonia for further treatment of his spinal injury. He was diagnosed with paraplegia due to the loss of the use of both his legs. From that point onward he has lived being mobile only by using his wheelchair. As Stojkoski described, this change was devastating shock and emotional anguish for him and his family.

As an effective method of physical and psychosocial rehabilitation Stojkoski successfully competed in various sports including table tennis, precise shooting, soccer, kayaking, gymnastics and swimming. However his signature athletic discipline became the ultramarathon mainly because it combines both physical strength and persistence.

Stojkoski noticed that most people with disabilities are not as positive and strong willed in adapting their disability into a normal everyday life as he is. In his everyday interactions he became as inspirational figure and a role model especially, for young people with disability which motivated him to become an activist in raising public awareness. He runs his ultramarathons in a regular wheelchair, not a sport or racing version one in order to inspire and motivate people with disabilities to overcome everyday boundaries and limitations.

In the Macedonian public Stojkoski is also known for his friendship with Toše Proeski. Since Proeski's death Stojkoski made a tradition of honoring their friendship by running a marathon from Prilep to Proeski's Memorial in Kruševo each year on Proeski's birthday – 25 January.

Stojkoski currently lives in his family home in Prilep with his spouse Zaklina and daughter Biljana.

== Achievements ==
In 2004 the Macedonian public first heard of Stojkoski when he announced his intention to run a 704 km ultramarathon in his wheelchair from Prilep to the Summer Olympic Games in Athens, Greece. With very few equipment and resources Stojkoski and his team of 4 successfully finished the marathon in 20 days at the official opening 13 August 2004.

In 2005 he was contacted by the non-profit organization Polio Plus which is active in advocacy and support of people with disabilities in Macedonia. They engaged Stojkoski in their campaign for raising 10000 signatures needed to pass a bill in the Macedonian parliament for protection of rights and dignity of people with disability. Within this campaign Stojkoski lead a caravan through Macedonia resulting with a 1500 km ultramarathon and raised 19000 signatures. However, the parliament still hasn't voted to pass the bill.

In the period of 2008-2012 Stojkoski each year on 25 January traveled a distance of 25.6 km from Prilep to Toše Proeski's Memorial in Krushevo on the day of his birthday. Despite uphill terrain and harsh cold weather, Stojkoski succeeded to continue this pilgrimage tradition for 5 years.

After lengthy preparations Stojkoski and his team of 15 people in 2007 started an ultramarathon of 15300 km passing through 31 countries starting from Krushevo, Macedonia and ending in Beijing, China for the Summer Olympic Games in 2008. Stojkoski's main goal was to form a foundation with sufficient funds to build rehabilitation and resocialization centers for people with disabilities in Macedonia.

However, despite passing a 50–70 km ultramarathon per day, due to insufficient funds and unissued visas, Stojkoski only reached the Syrian-Jordan border, completing a 3500 km ultramarathon in total. Stojkoski's event had successful media coverage and accomplished meetings with civic organizations, individuals, companies and institutional representatives in all major cities where he traveled through. After each 100 km the team with support of local representatives planted a Tree of Peace promoting humane values to all troublesome war regions on their travel route.

In 2009 Stojkoski initiated the Civic Caravan project for promotion of political rights and awareness of people with disabilities in Macedonia. The project consisted of an ultramarathon through 24 cities with a total length of 1000 km, timed intentionally during local election campaigns. Stojkoski had the idea to use the occasion and have meetings with political representatives and candidates on local levels as well as local civic organizations. He advocated the affirmative action of employing people with disabilities in local governance and moving forward the idea of people with disabilities running as candidates on local elections.

Stojkoski began his 10th marathon (5th ultramarathon) as a 5700 km journey through 15 European countries (Macedonia, Serbia, Hungary, Slovakia, Austria, Croatia, Slovenia, Italy, Switzerland, Germany, Netherland, Belgium, Luxemburg, France and UK) with total ultramarathon length of 3500 km. This ultramarathon started on 15 March in Krushevo and is scheduled to finish on 27 July 2012 (133 days) at the London Summer Olympics during their official opening. A new personal ultramarathon record for Mile Stojkoski was set at 101.1 km in a 15-hour run from Brescia to Monza, Italy on 6 May 2012. Old record was 86 km run from Adapazarı to Düzce Province, Turkey on 8 September 2007.

== Awards and recognition ==
2004 – Recognition for supporting people with disabilities awarded by the City of Prilep.
2004 – Vulkan Award for humanitarian achievements by Polio Plus.
2004 – Mother Teresa Award for humanitarian achievements by the Mother Teresa Foundation- Skopje.
2005 – Gert-Jan van Apeldoorn Award for Sustainable Development by Macedonian Center for International Cooperation.
2005 – 3ti Noemvri Life work award from the City of Prilep.
2007 – Honorary member of Lions Club – Skopje.

On 31 January 2012 The British Embassy in Skopje organized a reception in honor of HRH Prince Michael of Kent. Prince Michael presented a gift (official Olympic set) to Stojkoski congratulating him for his past achievements and wishing him success on his journey to the London Olympics in 2012.

== See also ==
- Jessica Cox, motivational speaker and world's first licensed armless pilot.
- Claire Lomas, First person to finish the Virgin London Marathon using a robotic walking aid.
- Nick Vujicic, motivational speaker and survivor of Tetra-amelia syndrome.
