= North Macedonia–United Arab Emirates relations =

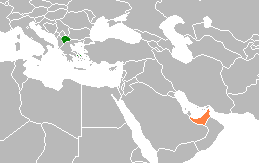

- North Macedonia: United Arab Emirates

Diplomatic mission
- Embassy of North Macedonia, Abu Dhabi: Represented through the Emirati Embassy, Rome, Italy

International relations exist between the nations of North Macedonia and the United Arab Emirates. North Macedonia has an embassy in Abu Dhabi. United Arab Emirates has a non-resident embassy in Rome.

In March 2023, the President of North Macedonia, Stevo Pendarovski, met with the President of the United Arab Emirates, Sheikh Mohamed bin Zayed Al Nahyan. Sheikh Mohamed expressed wishes for a further enhancement of relations between the UAE and North Macedonia. North Macedonia brought a delegation along to the meeting, and the UAE involved its ministers in the meeting.

After the meeting in 2023, a memorandum of understanding was announced providing visa exemptions to holders of passports issued by either of the two nation's governments. The MoU was described in the Khaleej Times as 'testament to the strengthening of bilateral relations between the United Arab Emirates and the Republic of North Macedonia and aims to facilitate travel between the two nations.'

Later that month, the UAE sent a delegation to Ohrid in North Macedonia, and announced its support of a European Union-sponsored plan to normalise relations between Serbia and the Republic of Kosovo. Due to its geography, Balkan security issues are important to North Macedonia. This support from the UAE was re-iterated by the UAE's Minister of Foreign Affairs, Sheikh Abdullah bin Zayed Al Nahyan, after visiting Belgrade and Pristina.

Other bilateral meetings between the leaders of the two nations include an October 2022 meeting between the Prime Minister of North Macedonia and the UAE's prime minister Bin Rashid Al Maktoum. International flights between the two nations was discussed at that meeting.

Some citizens of the United Arab Emirates have fled the state, and sought asylum in North Macedonia. These applications for asylum have in some cases been rejected. The rejection of Hind Mohammad Albolooki's asylum application in 2019 by North Macedonia made international headlines. Her case was rejected by North Macedonia and she attempted to seek asylum elsewhere.

The United Arab Emirates is a common destination for migrants from North Macedonia; particularly for those seeking work.

On 15 April 2025, Macedonian government sent a delegation of senior government officials in the UAE led by Prime Minister Hristijan Mickovski to meet with the president of the UAE and also the Emir of Abu Dhabi, Sheikh Mohammed bin Zayed Al Nahyan and Mohammed bin Rashid Al Maktoum and other high ranking officials to discuss on cooperation and investments in infrastructure between the two countries.

On 26 April 2025, Macedonian Prime Minister Hristijan Mickovski stated that there will be no need to travel to the United Arab Emirates with visas and that from now on it will be visa-free to travel between the two countries.

== See also ==
- Foreign relations of North Macedonia
- Foreign relations of the United Arab Emirates
