= Foreign relations of North Macedonia =

The foreign relations of North Macedonia since its independence in 1991 have been characterized by the country's efforts to gain membership in international organizations such as NATO and the European Union and to gain international recognition under its previous constitutional name, overshadowed by a long-standing, dead-locked dispute with neighboring Greece. Greek objections to the country's name had led to it being admitted to the United Nations and several other international fora only under the provisional designation Former Yugoslav Republic of Macedonia until its official and erga omnes renaming to North Macedonia, a name under which it is now universally recognised.

== Diplomatic relations ==
North Macedonia became a member state of the United Nations on April 8, 1993, eighteen months after its independence from the former Socialist Federal Republic of Yugoslavia. It was referred within the UN as "the former Yugoslav Republic of Macedonia", pending a resolution, to the long-running dispute about the country's name. Unusually, the country's flag was not raised at UN Headquarters when the state joined the UN. It was not until after the country's flag was changed that it was raised at the UN Headquarters. Other international bodies, such as the European Union, European Broadcasting Union, and the International Olympic Committee had adopted the same naming convention. NATO also used that name in official documents but added an explanation on which member countries recognise the constitutional name. A number of countries recognised the country by its former constitutional name – the Republic of Macedonia – rather than the UN reference, notably four of the five permanent UN Security Council members (the United Kingdom, the United States, China, and Russia). All UN member states currently recognise North Macedonia as a sovereign state.

=== List of countries ===
List of countries which North Macedonia maintains diplomatic relations with:

#	Country	Date
1	Slovenia	17 March 1992
2	Croatia	30 March 1992
3	Turkey	26 August 1992
4	Belarus	20 January 1993
5	New Zealand	8 April 1993
6	Bosnia and Herzegovina	12 May 1993
7	Indonesia	25 May 1993
8	Malaysia	22 July 1993
9	Pakistan	12 August 1993
10	China	12 October 1993
11	North Korea	2 November 1993
12	Angola	10 November 1993
13	Denmark	16 December 1993
14	Germany	16 December 1993
15	Italy	16 December 1993
16	Netherlands	16 December 1993
17	United Kingdom	16 December 1993
18	Norway	20 December 1993
19	Sweden	20 December 1993
20	Bulgaria	21 December 1993
21	Albania	24 December 1993
22	Finland	27 December 1993
23	France	27 December 1993
24	Iceland	29 December 1993
25	Poland	30 December 1993
26	Liechtenstein	31 January 1994
27	Russia	31 January 1994
28	Switzerland	31 January 1994
29	Belgium	14 February 1994
30	Japan	1 March 1994
31	Czech Republic	2 March 1994
32	Slovakia	4 March 1994
33	Kyrgyzstan	6 June 1994
34	Vietnam	10 June 1994
35	Bolivia	15 June 1994
36	Spain	28 July 1994
37	Hungary	29 August 1994
38	Luxembourg	19 September 1994
39	Egypt	14 November 1994
40	Portugal	15 November 1994
41	Ireland	13 December 1994
—	Holy See	21 December 1994
42	Austria	23 December 1994
43	Uzbekistan	31 December 1994
44	Romania	11 January 1995
45	Saudi Arabia	11 January 1995
46	Moldova	27 January 1995
47	India	9 February 1995
48	Antigua and Barbuda	21 February 1995
49	Estonia	10 March 1995
50	Iran	10 March 1995
51	Libya	14 April 1995
52	Ukraine	20 April 1995
53	Singapore	8 May 1995
54	Kazakhstan	1 June 1995
55	Mongolia	27 June 1995
56	Azerbaijan	28 June 1995
57	Lithuania	17 July 1995
58	United States	13 September 1995
59	Greece	13 October 1995
60	Australia	20 October 1995
61	Israel	7 December 1995
62	Oman	28 December 1995
63	Tajikistan	4 January 1996
64	Belize	25 January 1996
65	Ghana	7 February 1996
66	Latvia	13 February 1996
67	Bangladesh	14 February 1996
68	Laos	6 March 1996
69	Nicaragua	28 March 1996
70	Serbia	8 April 1996
71	Rwanda	18 April 1996
72	Honduras	25 April 1996
73	Sudan	26 April 1996
74	United Arab Emirates	27 May 1996
75	Turkmenistan	21 June 1996
76	Qatar	25 June 1996
77	Canada	4 July 1996
—	Sovereign Military Order of Malta	12 July 1996
78	Afghanistan	17 July 1996
79	Bahrain	11 September 1996
80	Costa Rica	15 October 1996
81	Dominica	18 October 1996
82	El Salvador	28 October 1996
83	Cambodia	29 October 1996
84	Tanzania	22 January 1997
85	Mozambique	28 February 1997
86	Djibouti	12 June 1997
87	Kuwait	16 June 1997
88	Guinea	28 November 1997
89	Nepal	6 January 1998
90	Zambia	30 March 1998
91	Sri Lanka	10 April 1998
92	Togo	14 April 1998
93	Sierra Leone	17 July 1998
94	Lesotho	3 September 1998
95	Gambia	29 September 1998
96	Yemen	6 October 1998
97	Brazil	14 October 1998
98	Argentina	24 September 1999
99	Democratic Republic of the Congo	27 September 1999
100	Malawi	27 September 1999
101	Chad	13 October 1999
102	Burundi	7 February 2000
103	Cuba	5 May 2000
104	Colombia	22 June 2000
105	Ecuador	22 June 2000
106	Comoros	29 June 2000
107	Guinea-Bissau	29 June 2000
108	São Tomé and Príncipe	11 July 2000
109	Ethiopia	17 July 2000
110	Uganda	26 July 2000
111	Saint Lucia	24 August 2000
112	Eritrea	13 September 2000
113	Ivory Coast	14 September 2000
114	Jordan	15 September 2000
115	Dominican Republic	18 September 2000
116	Gabon	13 November 2000
117	Maldives	13 November 2000
118	Niger	15 November 2000
119	Seychelles	7 February 2001
120	Mauritius	7 February 2001
121	Republic of the Congo	7 February 2001
122	Cameroon	6 April 2001
123	Haiti	11 April 2001
124	Mexico	4 October 2001
125	Guatemala	16 November 2001
126	Vanuatu	16 November 2001
127	Algeria	21 March 2002
128	Panama	18 April 2002
129	Venezuela	18 April 2002
130	Uruguay	17 May 2002
131	Equatorial Guinea	9 July 2002
132	Morocco	18 September 2002
133	Madagascar	18 October 2002
134	Senegal	20 October 2002
135	Central African Republic	20 October 2002
136	Marshall Islands	27 February 2003
137	Timor-Leste	25 March 2003
138	Jamaica	1 April 2003
139	Nigeria	24 April 2003
140	Saint Vincent and the Grenadines	15 May 2003
141	Myanmar	9 July 2003
142	Guyana	22 September 2003
143	Benin	26 November 2004
144	Burkina Faso	27 November 2004
145	Federated States of Micronesia	30 November 2004
146	Nauru	2 December 2004
147	Cape Verde	10 December 2004
148	Thailand	23 January 2005
149	Somalia	17 February 2005
150	Mauritania	23 March 2005
151	Iraq	10 June 2005
152	Peru	29 June 2005
153	Samoa	18 August 2005
154	Kenya	1 February 2006
155	Montenegro	14 June 2006
156	Suriname	12 April 2007
157	Eswatini	6 July 2007
158	Brunei	1 August 2007
159	Paraguay	26 October 2007
160	Chile	15 September 2008
161	Andorra	31 July 2009
162	Botswana	4 September 2009
—	Kosovo	17 October 2009
163	Fiji	15 March 2010
164	Syria	23 September 2010
165	Zimbabwe	13 January 2011
166	Tuvalu	29 June 2011
167	Namibia	21 December 2011
168	Malta	25 January 2017
169	Georgia	16 February 2019
170	South Korea	18 July 2019
171	Cyprus	30 August 2019
172	Saint Kitts and Nevis	12 September 2019
173	Monaco	26 September 2019
174	San Marino	26 September 2019
175	Armenia	27 September 2019
176	Tunisia	27 September 2019
177	Philippines	22 September 2021
178	South Africa	18 September 2023
179	Solomon Islands	23 September 2025
180	Lebanon	25 September 2025
181	Trinidad and Tobago	21 September 2026

== Bilateral relations ==
=== Multilateral ===
Organization	Formal Relations Began	Notes
European Union		See Accession of North Macedonia to the European Union
NATO		See North Macedonia–NATO relations North Macedonia joined NATO on 27 March 2020.

=== Africa ===
Country	Formal Relations Began	Notes
Egypt	14 November 1994	North Macedonia has an embassy in Cairo.
South Africa	18 September 2023	South Africa is represented in North Macedonia by its embassy in Athens, Greece.

=== Americas ===
Country	Formal Relations Began	Notes
Argentina	24 September 1999	Argentina is accredited to North Macedonia from its embassy in Sofia, Bulgaria.; North Macedonia is accredited to Argentina from its embassy in Madrid, Spain.
Brazil	14 September 1998	Brazil is accredited to North Macedonia from its embassy in Sofia, Bulgaria.; North Macedonia has an embassy in Brasília.
Canada	4 July 1996	See Canada–North Macedonia relations: Canada is accredited to North Macedonia from its embassy in Belgrade, Serbia.; North Macedonia has an embassy in Ottawa.; Canada has an honorary consulate in Skopje.
Mexico	4 October 2001	Mexico is accredited to North Macedonia from its embassy in Belgrade, Serbia.; North Macedonia is accredited to Mexico from its embassy in Washington, D.C., United States.; Mexico has an honorary consulate in Skopje.
United States	13 September 1995	See North Macedonia–United States relations Then US President George W. Bush with the political leaders of North Macedonia in 2008 The United States and North Macedonia enjoy excellent bilateral relations. The United States formally recognized North Macedonia on February 8, 1994, and the two countries established full diplomatic relations on September 13, 1995. The U.S. Liaison Office was upgraded to an embassy in February 1996, and the first U.S. Ambassador to Skopje arrived in July 1996. The development of political relations between the United States and North Macedonia has ushered in a whole host of other contacts between the two states. In 2004, the United States recognized the country under its constitutional name of that time – Republic of Macedonia.: North Macedonia has an embassy in Washington, D.C. and consulates-general in Chicago, Detroit and Ridgefield Park.; United States has an embassy in Skopje.

=== Asia ===
Country	Formal Relations Began	Notes
Azerbaijan	28 June 1995	See Azerbaijan–North Macedonia relations: The government of North Macedonia recognized the independence of Azerbaijan on June 25, 1995.; Diplomatic relations were established on June 28, 1995.
China	12 October 1993	See China–North Macedonia relations On October 12, 1993, the Government of the Republic of North Macedonia and the Government of the People's Republic of China (PRC) established diplomatic relations with North Macedonia expressly declaring that the Government of the PRC is the sole legal government of China, and Taiwan as an inalienable part of the Chinese territory. The Government of North Macedonia affirmed it would not establish any form of official relations with Taiwan.: China has an embassy in Skopje.; North Macedonia has an embassy in Beijing.
Georgia	16 February 2019	See Georgia–North Macedonia relations Both countries established diplomatic relations on February 16, 2019.
India	1996	See India–North Macedonia relations Both countries established diplomatic relations in 1996.: North Macedonia has an embassy in New Delhi.
Indonesia		Indonesia is represented in North Macedonia by its embassy in Sofia, Bulgaria.: Indonesia has an honorary consulate in Skopje.
Iran	10 March 1995	Both countries established diplomatic relations on March 10, 1995.: Iran has an embassy in Skopje.; North Macedonia is accredited to Iran from its embassy in Ankara, Turkey.
Israel	7 December 1995	See Israel–North Macedonia relations Both countries established diplomatic relations on December 7, 1995.: Israel has an honorary consulate in Skopje.; North Macedonia has an embassy in Tel Aviv.
Japan	March 1994	See Japan–North Macedonia relations Both countries established diplomatic relations in March 1994. North Macedonia opened its first resident embassy in Tokyo in 2013 and the first resident ambassador of North Macedonia to Japan is H.E. Dr. Andrijana Cvetkovik: Japan has an embassy in Skopje.
Kazakhstan		The two countries hold regular political consultations on subjects of political, economic, cultural, humanitarian issues.: North Macedonia has an embassy in Astana.
North Korea	11 October 1993	Both countries established diplomatic relations on October 11, 1993. They enjoy friendly relations. DPRK is represented in North Macedonia through its embassy in Sofia.
South Korea	18 July 2019	Due to the concern of Greece on Macedonia naming dispute, The Republic of Korea did not establish formal diplomatic relations with Macedonia until it renamed itself "Republic of North Macedonia". Both countries established diplomatic relations on July 18, 2019. South Korea is represented in North Macedonia through its embassy in Sofia, Bulgaria.
Qatar		North Macedonia has an embassy in Doha.; Qatar has an embassy in Skopje.
Taiwan	27 January 1999	Notwithstanding the above, North Macedonia and the Republic of China on Taiwan (ROC) established diplomatic relations on January 27, 1999. This development increased the number of the ROC's diplomatic allies in Europe from one to two (the other being the Holy See). The PRC was opposed to this and in retaliation vetoed the UN resolution renewing the mandate of the UNPREDEP (a peacekeeping force) in North Macedonia. On April 28, 1999, North Macedonia opened an embassy in Taipei, ROC. The Republic of North Macedonia and the PRC normalized their relations on June 18, 2001. On the same day, the ROC severed diplomatic relations with North Macedonia. In the joint communiqué between North Macedonia and People's Republic of China, North Macedonia recognized "emphatically that there is but one China in the world, that the Government of the People's Republic of China is the sole legal government representing the whole of China and that Taiwan is an inalienable part of the Chinese territory".
Turkey		See North Macedonia–Turkey relations Due to historical and cultural mutualities and human bonds North Macedonia and Turkey have very close and friendly relations. Shortly after North Macedonia declared its independence from the former Yugoslavia in 1991, Turkey was among the first countries to recognise North Macedonia's sovereignty. Bilateral relations were established on August 26, 1992.: North Macedonia has an embassy in Ankara and a consulate-general in Istanbul.; Turkey has an embassy in Skopje and a consulate-general in Bitola.; Both countries are full members of NATO.
United Arab Emirates		North Macedonia has an embassy in Abu Dhabi.
Vietnam	10 June 1994	Both countries established diplomatic relations on June 10, 1994.; North Macedonia is represented in Vietnam through its embassy in Beijing, China.; Vietnam is represented in North Macedonia through its embassy in Sofia, Bulgaria.

=== Europe ===
Country	Formal Relations Began	Notes
Albania		See Albania–North Macedonia relations Recently (Aug. 2008) they signed a treaty enabling visa-free movement between the countries. Both countries support each other's ethnic minorities in cultural, political and educational aspects. During the ethnic conflict in 2001, the Albanian government did not interfere and supported a peaceful resolution. Albania had recognized Skopje under the UN provisional reference of the "former Yugoslav Republic of Macedonia", abbreviated as FYROM. Both countries are full members of the NATO and Council of Europe. On 26 November 2019, an earthquake struck Albania. North Macedonia sent €100,000 in financial aid, drones with thermal cameras, rescue teams and mechanical equipment for relief operations. Both countries started EU Accession negotiations on 24 March 2020.: Albania has an embassy in Skopje.; North Macedonia has an embassy in Tirana.
Austria	23 December 1994	See Austria–North Macedonia relations: Austria has an embassy in Skopje.; North Macedonia has an embassy in Vienna.; Both countries are full members of the Council of Europe.; Austria is an EU member and North Macedonia is an EU candidate.
Belgium		Belgium is accredited to North Macedonia from its embassy in Sofia, Bulgaria.; North Macedonia has an embassy in Brussels.; Both countries are full members of NATO.
Bosnia and Herzegovina		See Bosnia and Herzegovina–North Macedonia relations: Bosnia has an embassy in Skopje.; North Macedonia has an embassy in Sarajevo.
Bulgaria	On 15 January 1992, Bulgaria was the first country to officially recognize the then Republic of Macedonia. On 12 September 1992, consulates general of both countries were opened, in Sofia and Skopje respectively. On 21 December 1993, diplomatic relations at the embassy level were established between Bulgaria and the Republic of Macedonia.	See Bulgaria–North Macedonia relations Bulgaria–North Macedonia relations refer to the bilateral relations between Bulgaria and North Macedonia. Rules for governing good neighbourly relations were agreed between Bulgaria and North Macedonia in the Joint Declaration of February 22, 1999 and reaffirmed by a joint memorandum signed on January 22, 2008 in Sofia. The governments of Bulgaria and North Macedonia signed a friendship treaty to bolster the relations between the two Balkan states in August 2017. The treaty was ratified by the parliament of the Republic of North Macedonia on the 15th of and of Bulgaria on 18 January 2018.: Bulgaria is the first country in the world to recognise Macedonia as an independent state.; Both countries are full members of NATO.; Bulgaria has an embassy in Skopje.; North Macedonia has an embassy in Sofia.
Croatia		See Croatia–North Macedonia relations: Croatia has an embassy in Skopje.; North Macedonia has an embassy in Zagreb.; Both countries are full members of NATO.
Cyprus	29 August 2019	See Cyprus–North Macedonia relations Both countries established diplomatic relations on August 29, 2019.
Czech Republic	2 March 1994	See Czech Republic–North Macedonia relations: Both countries are full members of NATO.; North Macedonia has an embassy in Prague.; Czech Republic has a consular agency in Skopje.
Denmark		See Denmark–North Macedonia relations: Both countries are full members of NATO.; North Macedonia has an embassy in Copenhagen.; Denmark has an honorary consulate-general in Skopje.
Estonia	2 March 1995	Both countries established diplomatic relations on March 2, 1995.: Both countries are full members of NATO.; North Macedonia has an embassy in Tallinn.; Estonia has an honorary consulate in Skopje.
Finland		Finland is an EU member and North Macedonia is a candidate.; Both countries are full members of NATO.
France		See France–North Macedonia relations: France has an embassy in Skopje.; North Macedonia has an embassy in Paris.; Both countries are full members of NATO.
Germany		See Germany–North Macedonia relations: Germany has an embassy in Skopje.; North Macedonia has an embassy in Berlin.; Both countries are full members of NATO.
Greece		See Greece–North Macedonia relations North Macedonia and Greece have excellent economic and business relations, with Greece being the largest investor in the country. Until the Prespa Agreement (2019), the indeterminate status of North Macedonia's former name arose from a long-running dispute with Greece. The main points of the dispute were: The name: see Macedonia naming dispute, and the section Naming issue (resolved, below in this article).; The flag: the use of Vergina Sun, a Greek state symbol, on the initial national flag used between 1992 and 1995 (resolved, see below); Constitutional issues: certain articles of the constitution that were seen as claims on Greek territory (resolved, see below).; The naming issue was "parked" in a compromise agreed at the United Nations in 1993. However, Greece refused to grant diplomatic recognition to the Republic and imposed an economic blockade that lasted until the flag and constitutional issues were resolved in 1995. The naming issue was resolved with the Prespa Agreement, signed in 2018, and entered into force in February 2019.: Both countries are full members of NATO.; Greece has an embassy in Skopje.; North Macedonia has an embassy in Athens.
Iceland		Iceland is represented in North Macedonia through its embassy in Vienna, Austria.; North Macedonia is represented in Iceland through its embassy in London, United Kingdom, and an honorary consulate in Reykjavík.; Both countries are full members of NATO.
Italy		Italy has an embassy in Skopje.; North Macedonia has an embassy in Rome and a consulate-general in Venice.; Both countries are full members of NATO.
Kosovo		See Kosovo–North Macedonia relations North Macedonia and Kosovo have very friendly and cordial neighbourly relations which mainly are due to the ethnic Albanian populations that live inside North Macedonia. In October 2008, North Macedonia recognized Kosovo as an independent state with plan to establish diplomatic relations. Kosovo recognized the neighbouring country under its former constitutional name, Republic of Macedonia. Also in October 2008, a bilateral agreement was signed between the two countries after the border between the two was physically marked by a joint committee. Kosovo and North Macedonia have signed a Free Trade Agreement in 2005 to facilitate trade opportunities, investment conditions and improve good-neighbourly relations. North Macedonia's investments are the largest in Kosovo since its independence on February 17, 2008 year.: Kosovo has an embassy in Skopje.; North Macedonia has an embassy in Pristina.
Lithuania	18 July 1995	Both countries established diplomatic relations on July 18, 1995.: Both countries are full members of NATO.; Lithuania has an honorary consulate in Skopje.
Montenegro	14 June 2006	See North Macedonia–Montenegro relations Both countries established diplomatic relations on June 14, 2006.: Both countries are full members of NATO.; North Macedonia has an embassy in Podgorica.; Montenegro has an embassy in Skopje.
Netherlands		the Netherlands has an embassy in Skopje.; North Macedonia has an embassy in The Hague.; Both countries are full members of the Council of Europe and NATO.
Norway	1993	Both countries established diplomatic relations in 1993.: Both countries are full members of NATO.; North Macedonia has an embassy in Oslo.; Norway has an embassy in Skopje.
Poland		North Macedonia has an embassy in Warsaw.; Poland has an embassy in Skopje.; Both countries are full members of NATO.
Romania	11 January 1995	Both countries established diplomatic relations on January 11, 1995.: Both countries are full members of NATO.; North Macedonia has an embassy in Bucharest.; Romania has an embassy in Skopje.
Russia		See North Macedonia–Russia relations: North Macedonia has an embassy in Moscow.; Russia has an embassy in Skopje.
Serbia		See North Macedonia–Serbia relations North Macedonia and Serbia traditionally have friendly relations. Serbia is a main trading partner and recognized its neighbour under its former constitutional name – Republic of Macedonia. Macedonians in Serbia are a recognized national minority, same as Serbs in North Macedonia. However, the non-recognition of the Macedonian Orthodox Church by the Serbian Orthodox Church and North Macedonia's recognition of Kosovo as an independent state are disturbing the relations of these two countries.: North Macedonia has an embassy in Belgrade.; Serbia has an embassy in Skopje.
Slovenia	12 February 1992	See North Macedonia–Slovenia relations North Macedonia and Slovenia have very close political and economic relations. Once part of SFR Yugoslavia, the two republics declared independence in 1991 (Slovenia in June, North Macedonia in September) and recognised each other's independence on February 12, 1992. Diplomatic relations between both countries were established on March 17, 1992. Slovenia supports North Macedonia's sovereignty, territorial integrity, its Euro-integration and visa liberalisation. A significant number of Slovenian investments ended up in North Macedonia. In 2007, about 70 million euros were invested. In January 2009, the Macedonian prime minister Nikola Gruevski announced, that he expects more Slovenian investments in infrastructure and energy projects. Over 70 Slovenian companies are present on the Macedonian market.: Both countries are full members of NATO.; Slovenia has an embassy in Skopje.; North Macedonia has an embassy in Ljubljana.
Spain		See North Macedonia–Spain relations: North Macedonia has an embassy in Madrid.; Spain has an embassy in Skopje.; Both countries are full members of NATO.
Sweden		Sweden is an EU member and North Macedonia is an candidate.; Both countries are full members of NATO.
Ukraine		See North Macedonia–Ukraine relations: North Macedonia has an embassy in Kyiv.; Ukraine has an embassy in Skopje.
United Kingdom	16 December 1993	See North Macedonia–United Kingdom relations North Macedonia established diplomatic relations with the United Kingdom on 16 December 1993.: North Macedonia maintains an embassy in London.; The United Kingdom is accredited to North Macedonia through its embassy in Skopje.; Both countries share common membership of the Council of Europe, the International Criminal Court, NATO, OSCE, and the World Trade Organization. Bilaterally the two countries have a Partnership, Trade and Cooperation Agreement.

=== Oceania ===
Country	Formal Relations Began	Notes
Australia	15 February 1994	See Australia–North Macedonia relations: Both countries established diplomatic relations on 15 February 1994.; Australia is accredited to North Macedonia from its embassy in Belgrade, Serbia.; North Macedonia has an embassy in Canberra.; Australia has an honorary consulate in Skopje.
New Zealand		North Macedonia is accredited to New Zealand from its embassy in Canberra, Australia.; New Zealand is accredited to North Macedonia from its embassy in Rome, Italy.

== Issues ==
=== Flag issue ===
The former flag of the former Republic of Macedonia (used from 1992 to 1995), bearing the Vergina Sun

North Macedonia's first post-independence flag caused a major controversy when it was unveiled. The use of the Vergina Sun on the flag was seen by Greece as territorial claim to the northern Greek region of Macedonia, where the golden larnax containing the symbol was unearthed in 1977 during excavations in Vergina by Greek archaeologist Manolis Andronikos.

The Vergina Sun, claimed by Greece as an exclusive state symbol, was removed from the flag under an agreement reached between the Republic of North Macedonia and Greece in September 1995. The Republic agreed to meet a number of Greek demands for changes to its national symbols and constitution, while Greece agreed to establish diplomatic relations with the Republic and end its economic blockade.

Under the Prespa Agreement, North Macedonia recognised (among other Ancient Macedonian elements) the Vergina Sun as a Hellenic symbol and agreed to remove the Vergina Sun from public display in all State-owned organisations, products, logos, etc. The implementation of this clause started on August 12, 2019.

Within six months following the entry into force of this Agreement, the Second Party [i.e. North Macedonia] shall review the status of monuments, public buildings and infrastructures on its territory, and insofar as they refer in any way to ancient Hellenic history and civilization constituting an integral component of the historic or cultural patrimony of the First Party, shall take appropriate corrective action to effectively address the issue and ensure respect for the said patrimony.

—Article 8, paragraph 2 of the Prespa agreement

The Second Party [i.e. North Macedonia] shall not use again in any way and in all its forms the symbol formerly displayed on its former national flag [i.e. the Vergina Sun]. Within six months of the entry into force of this Agreement, the Second Party shall proceed to the removal of the symbol displayed on its former national flag from all public sites and public usages on its territory. Archaeological artefacts do not fall within the scope of this provision.

—Article 8, paragraph 3 of the Prespa agreement

=== Constitutional issue ===
North Macedonia's first post-independence constitution, adopted on November 17, 1991 included a number of clauses that Greece interpreted as promoting secessionist sentiment among the Slavophone population of northern Greece, and making irredentist claims on Greek territory. Article 49 of the constitution caused particular concern. It read:

(1) The Republic cares for the status and rights of those persons belonging to the Macedonian people in neighboring countries, as well as Macedonian expatriates, assists their cultural development and promotes links with them. In the exercise of this concern the Republic will not interfere in the sovereign rights of other states or in their internal affairs.
(2) The Republic cares for the cultural, economic and social rights of the citizens of the Republic abroad.

The Greek government interpreted this as a licence for North Macedonia to interfere in Greek internal affairs. Given long-standing Greek sensitivities over the position of the country's minority groups, the government saw this as being the most serious of the three main issues affecting relations between the two countries; the issue of the republic's symbols, by contrast, was seen as being of much less substantive importance, even though it aroused the loudest political controversy. The Greek prime minister at the time, Constantine Mitsotakis, later commented that

What concerned me from the very first moment was not the name of the state. The problem for me was that [we should not allow] the creation of a second minority problem in the area of western [Greek] Macedonia [the first minority being the Turkish-speaking Greeks of western Thrace]. My main aim was to convince the Republic to declare that there is no Slavomacedonian minority in Greece. This was the real key of our difference with Skopje.

The offending articles were removed under the 1995 agreement between the two sides.

== See also ==
- List of diplomatic missions in North Macedonia
- List of diplomatic missions of North Macedonia
- List of state visits made by Gjorge Ivanov
- Visa requirements for citizens of North Macedonia
- Foreign relations of Yugoslavia
- Macedonian Center for International Cooperation
