= Kosovo–North Macedonia relations =

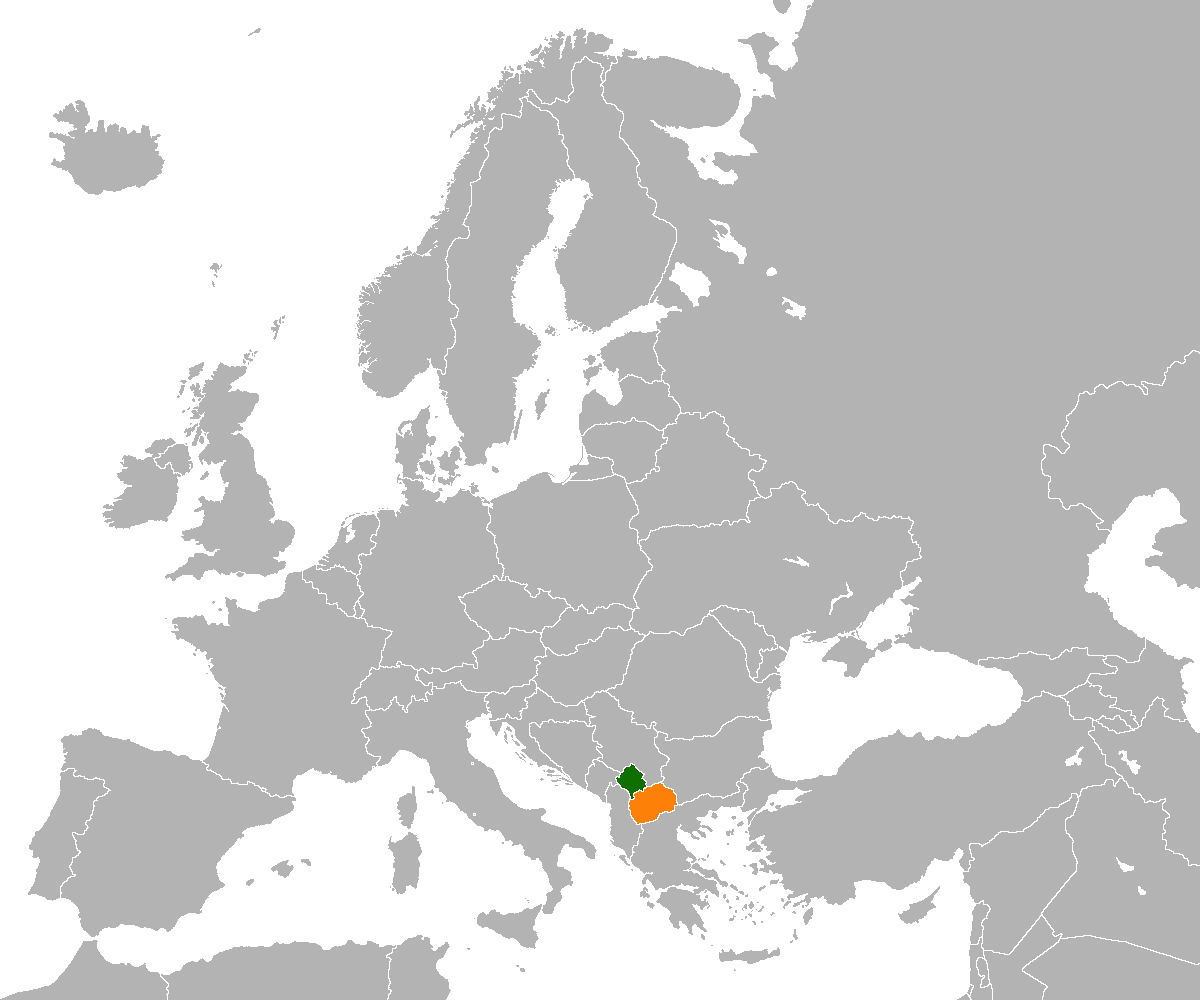

- Kosovo: North Macedonia

Diplomatic mission
- Embassy of Kosovo, Skopje: Embassy of North Macedonia, Pristina

Envoy
- Ambassador Gjergj Dedaj: Ambassador Shpresa Jusufi

Diplomatic relations are maintained between the Republic of Kosovo and the Republic of North Macedonia.

== Diplomatic relations ==
Informal relations started on 9 October 2008 when North Macedonia recognised Kosovo after its declaration of independence from Serbia on 17 February of the same year. In October 2009, Kosovo signed an agreement to re-adjust its border with North Macedonia by exchanging some lands. This agreement was an important landmark in their diplomatic history since it resolved an eight-year-old border dispute that arose from the 2001 Albanian insurgency in North Macedonia. Finalized in 2009 with negotiations under the auspices of the EU and the U.S., the demarcation of the 150-kilometer border was made possible. Both parties described the terms of the deal on sovereignty, integrity of territories, and other merits of the peaceful settlements of the disputes. It also helped people from Kosovo engage in cross-border activities on their properties in North Macedonia. In response to the deal, EU officials hailed it as a marker of a new and profound partnership, a sign of ‘maturity and mutual respect.’

On 17 October 2009, Skopje and Pristina officially established diplomatic relations. On 12 November 2009, North Macedonia upgraded its Liaison Office in Pristina to an Embassy and an Ambassador was appointed. Kosovan Embassy in Albania was initially accredited to North Macedonia until an embassy was opened in Skopje.

== Travel ==
North Macedonia recognised the Kosovan passport on 12 July 2008 prior to the full diplomatic recognition of the Republic of Kosovo. Kosovo citizens have visa-free entry into North Macedonia for a short-term stay of up to 90 days within 6 months, and vice versa. This agreement boosts tourism, business, and family visits without further formalities. However, it is required that travellers ensure their passports have at least six months of validity beyond the period of intended stay. Crossing into North Macedonia with Kosovo citizenship requires a valid biometric passport, but national ID cards may also be allowed for certain categories of visitors. The same is true for Macedonian citizens when they enter Kosovo.

Kosovo and North Macedonia benefit from streamlined processes at border crossings to further facilitate travel between them for mutual tourism and economic cooperation. Such processes form part of the wider regional efforts toward better connectivity within the Western Balkans.

Most of the tourists arrive without a visa but working and residing in the territory for a long time need appropriate permits and documentation. Kosovo citizens, first have to review their purpose for visiting North Macedonia to ensure it is legally acceptable.

== History ==
Before the recognition, President Branko Crvenkovski said "The Republic of Macedonia will decide its view when we deem it most appropriate for our interests. [The Republic of Macedonia] would follow the position of NATO and the European Union on Kosovo, but nations in the two organisations have to yet to assume a common stance." The Democratic Party of Albanians left the government coalition on 13 March 2008 after it failed to meet their six demands, recognising Kosovo's independence being one of them. However, it returned on 24 March 2008 after demanding the recognition of Kosovo. On 27 March 2008, Minister of Foreign Affairs of Macedonia Antonio Milošoski issued the following statement: "In welcoming the constructive position of the Republic of Macedonia concerning Kosovo, the Commission on Foreign Affairs of the European Parliament has expressed concern because of delay in the technical demarcation of the Republic of Macedonia-Kosovo borderline and has asked that this issue be solved in accordance with the Ahtisaari proposal." This reiterated Macedonia's support for the Ahtisaari plan for Kosovo, which was endorsed by the foreign affairs ministry a year earlier, on 30 March 2007. On 10 July, Foreign Ministry spokesman Petar Culev announced that Macedonia will accept new Kosovan passports. Ali Ahmeti, leader of the ethnic Albanian Democratic Union for Integration party, said Macedonia would recognise Kosovo after problems over the border demarcation were resolved. (The Democratic Union for Integration is a member of the governing coalition; however, Ahmeti has no role as minister in the government.) North Macedonia has 158.7 km (98.6 mi)-long border with Kosovo. On 12 May 2009 Gjorge Ivanov became the new president of Macedonia. Soon after his inauguration Ivanov invited the president of Kosovo Fatmir Sejdiu to be the first statesman to visit Macedonia in his mandate, but Sejdiu cancelled his visit to Macedonia, because the visit was planned to be a non-formal meeting. The Kosovan side expected a full official meeting between two statesmen. The following weeks saw something of a crisis in the relations of the two countries. There were even speculations that Macedonia might revert its decision to recognise Kosovo as an independent state. However, Skopje officially denied that it wants to revert the recognition of Kosovo. Relations were normalised soon at a regional meeting.

Bilateral relations between the two neighbouring countries were assessed as good, while the Albanians living in North Macedonia are considered to be a strong connecting bridge with Kosovo. In December 2021, President of the Republic of North Macedonia, Stevo Pendarovski, visited Kosovo. It was the first time a president of this neighboring country visited Kosovo on an official visit. In March 2022, Speaker of the Parliament of North Macedonia, Talat Xhaferi, stated at a meeting with President of the Republic of Kosovo, Vjosa Osmani, in Pristina, that North Macedonia unreservedly supports Kosovo's membership in NATO, the Council of Europe and other international organizations.

According to a 2024 survey conducted by IRI Global, 10% of surveyed Macedonians view Kosovo as North Macedonia’s biggest threat, while Serbia is viewed as the biggest ally by 34% of the surveyed.

== Economic and trade partnership ==
Kosovo and North Macedonia are deepening economic collaboration, particularly in trade and energy sectors, as part of broader regional development initiatives.

Energy Security Collaboration: The countries are collaborating on energy security through initiatives like electricity grid integration and renewable energy promotion. These projects align with the EU’s strategy to diversify energy sources in the Western Balkans, reducing dependency on external suppliers. Joint projects in solar and wind energy are being explored, potentially positioning the region as a leader in sustainable energy practices.

Trade Relations: Kosovo and North Macedonia invest a lot of effort into developing their bilateral trade, which pragmatic work for the most part comprises tariff liberalization and the development of investment ties. Specifically, in 2024, the bilateral talks pointed to two general areas concerning non-tariff barriers that need to be removed for ease of trade facilitation. These measures intend for the main industry sectors, including agriculture, technology, and small-to-medium enterprises (SME) to gain from assistance. Efforts in these fields are coherent with the region’s economic agenda and with the overall EU vision regarding the capacity of Western Balkan economies to integrate with the community.

Also, pursuing competitiveness and business development under the EU-funded Cross-Border Cooperation Program, both countries are working further. This program fosters SME development and works hard to seek cohesion that enhances trade and investment within a border context. Extremely important is that the focus has been made on environmentally sustainable practices and thus the simultaneous application of sustainable economic growth and development and the fight against climate change. These are supplemented by their effort within the framework of the Central European Free Trade Agreement (CEFTA) aimed at updating and liberalizing trading relationships and promoting joint undertakings by the private sector. Such efforts are important for marketing access and to ensure that both nations are able to benefit from their geographical and economic complementarity.

These partnerships are supported by EU mechanisms such as the Growth and Reform Facility, which provides funding for infrastructure and policy reforms, strengthening the economic ties between Western Balkans countries.

== See also ==
- Foreign relations of Kosovo
- Foreign relations of North Macedonia
- Accession of Kosovo to the European Union
- Accession of North Macedonia to the European Union
- North Macedonia–Serbia relations
