= North Macedonia–Ukraine relations =

- North Macedonia: Ukraine

North Macedonia–Ukraine relations are the bilateral relations of the Republic of North Macedonia and Ukraine. There is an embassy of North Macedonia in Kyiv, while Ukraine maintains an embassy in Skopje. Ukraine also has a consulate in Bitola. Over the years, there have been several efforts to strengthen relations between the two countries. Both countries are full members of the BSCE and COE. North Macedonia provided military aid to Ukraine during the Russian invasion of Ukraine. North Macedonia is supporting membership for the NATO which Ukraine applied for in 2022.

== History ==
Relations between Ukraine and North Macedonia were established on 23 July 1993, when Ukraine recognized the independence of the then Republic of Macedonia. Diplomatic relations were established 20 April 1995 by exchange of notes between the Ministry of Foreign Affairs of Ukraine and the Ministry of Foreign Affairs of North Macedonia. North Macedonia opened an embassy in Kyiv during December 1997. Diplomatic mission of Ukraine in North Macedonia began in June 2000. Ukraine opened an embassy in the Republic of North Macedonia during November 2001.

In July 2019, the two countries signed a deal allowing for visa-free travel for citizens of both countries in the other.

== Economic cooperation ==
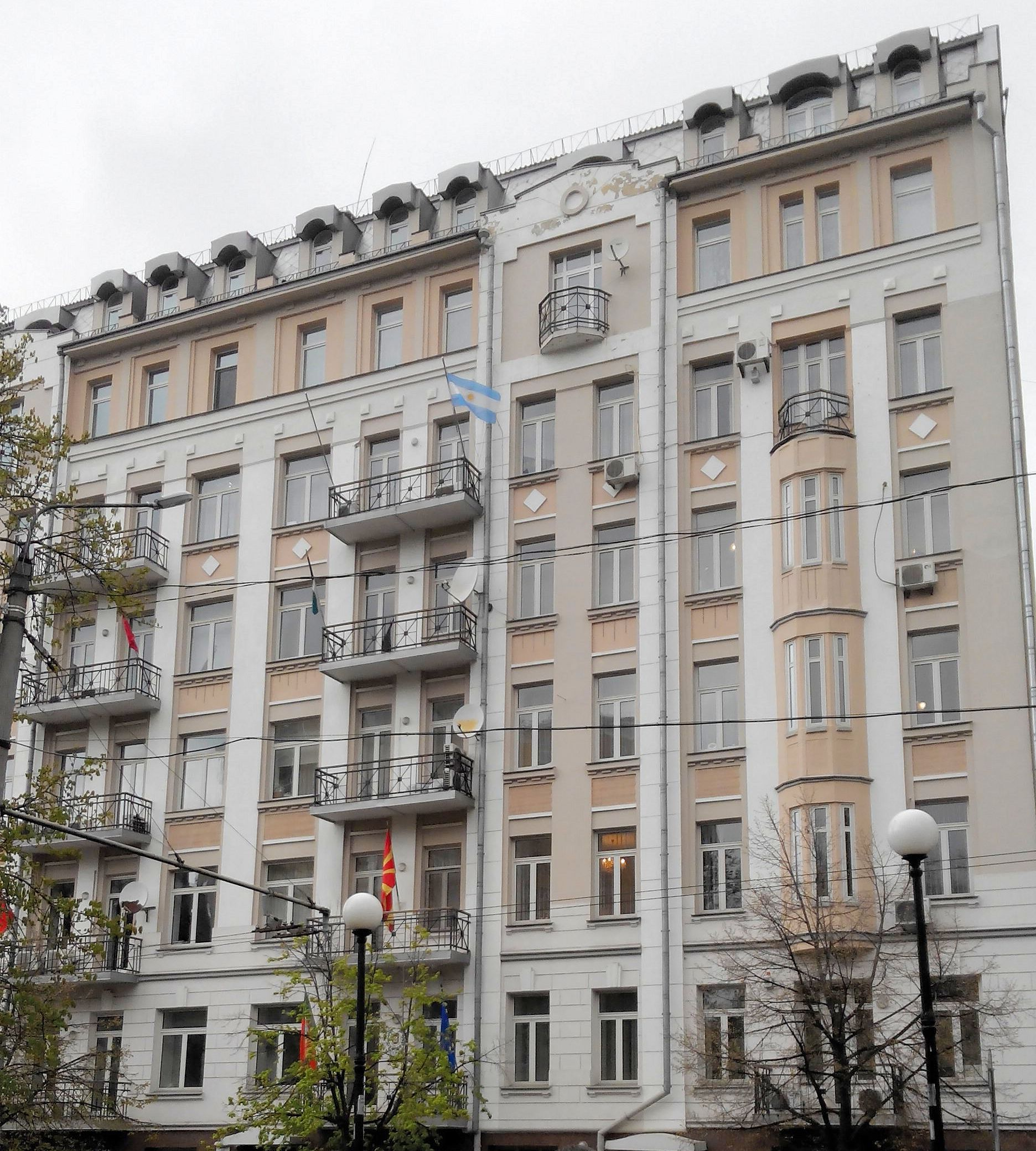
Embassy of North Macedonia in Kyiv

In 2011, a number of buses built in a factory in the city of Lviv, western Ukraine, were exported to North Macedonia, numbering close to 100. Ukrainian buses are used in Skopje, the capital of North Macedonia. As of that year, the Lviv bus plant was the sole supplier of buses to North Macedonia.

== Political cooperation ==
A deal was reached between the ministries of culture of the two countries to sell wax figures from a Kyiv factory to a cultural museum of North Macedonia in August 2008. It was part of an agreement to expand cooperation between North Macedonia and Ukraine in the fields of culture, education, and science.

== Macedonian ambassadors to Ukraine ==
The list of ambassadors of North Macedonia to Ukraine.

1. Vlado Blazhevski
2. Martin Huleski
3. Ilija Isajlovski
4. Aco Spacenoski
5. Stolye Zemjkosky

== Resident diplomatic missions ==
- North Macedonia has an embassy in Kyiv.
- Ukraine has an embassy in Skopje.

== See also ==
- Foreign relations of North Macedonia
- Foreign relations of Ukraine
- Ukraine-NATO relations
- Accession of North Macedonia to the EU
- Accession of Ukraine to the EU
