= Israel–North Macedonia relations =

- Israel: North Macedonia

Israel–North Macedonia relations refer to the bilateral political relations between Israel and Macedonia. Macedonia has an embassy in Tel Aviv. Israel does not have a resident ambassador.

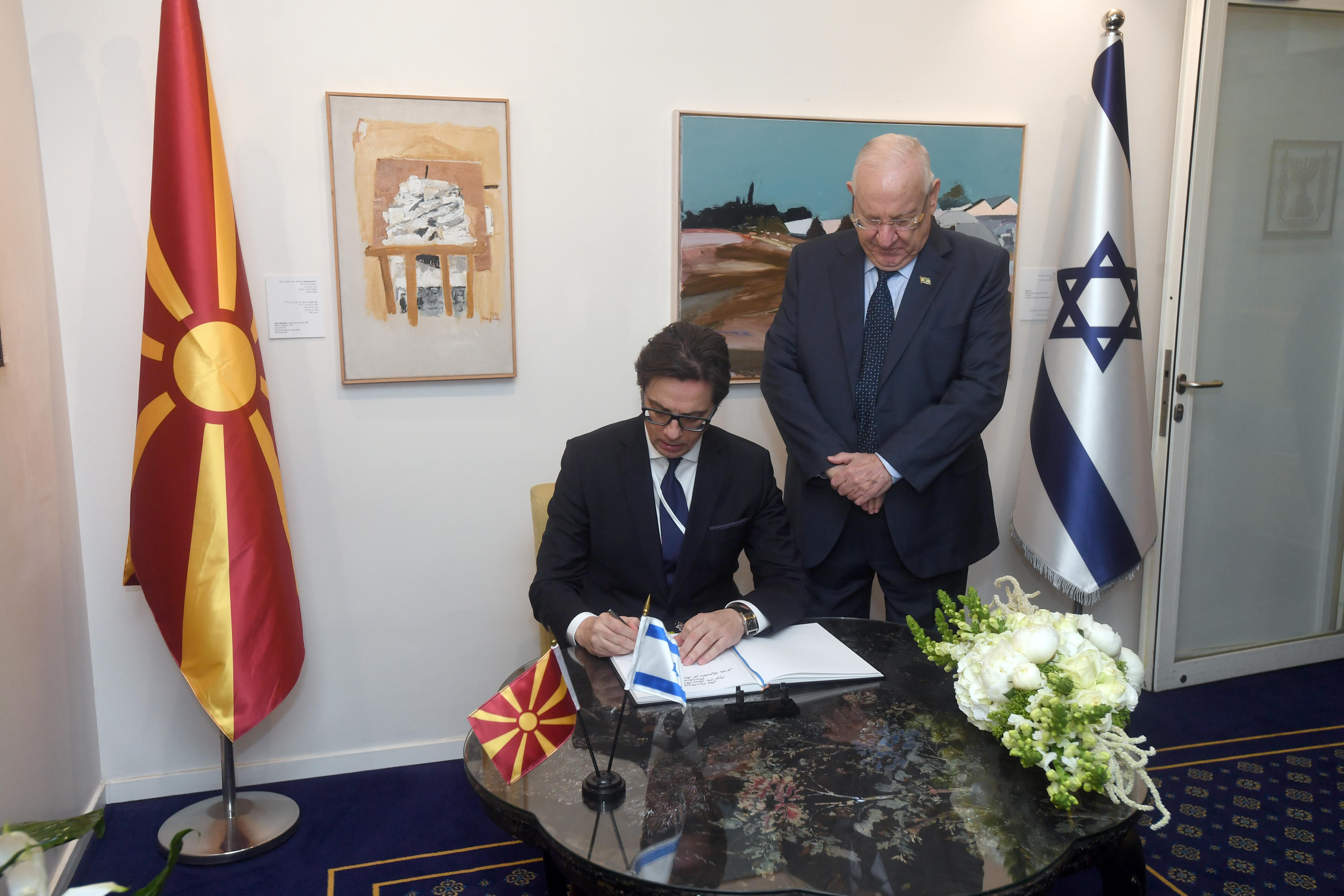
President of Israel Reuven Rivlin with Stevo Pendarovski

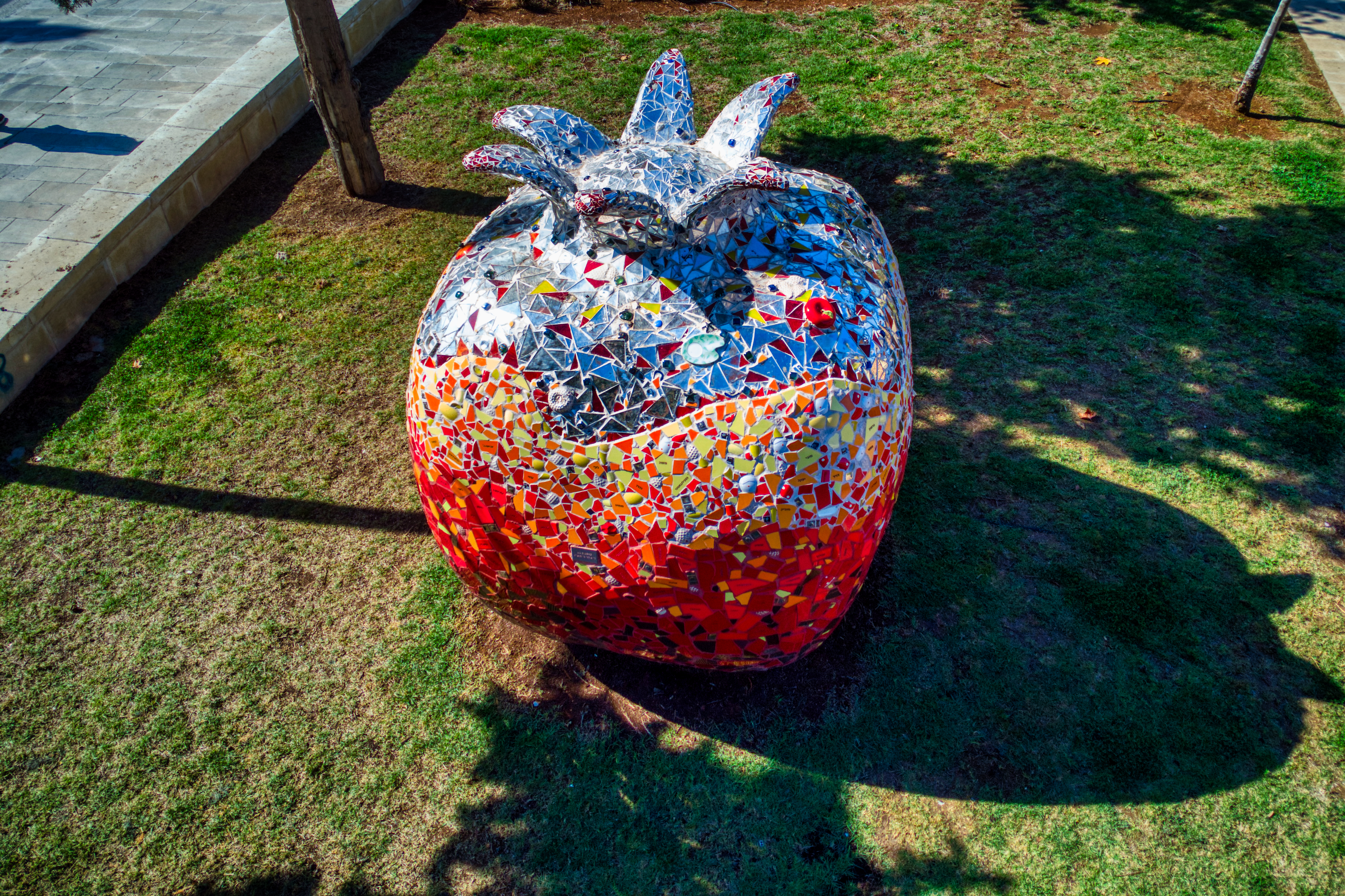
"Pomegranate" monument in Jerusalem dedicated to the memory of the Macedonian Jews murdered in the Holocaust.

Relations between the two states are close and friendly.

== History ==
The two countries established diplomatic relations on 7 December 1995. The establishment of diplomatic relations between Israel and North Macedonia was done under the then-provisional UN reference for North Macedonia - the former Yugoslav Republic of Macedonia - however, Israel later changed its position and recognised North Macedonia under its former constitutional name Republic of Macedonia, thus being one of 133 countries in the world recognising North Macedonia under its chosen name. North Macedonia is one of the few countries in Europe (and in the world) with no political and diplomatic relations with Palestine, of any kind.

Both countries are Ottoman successor states.

In late January 2026, a North Macedonian parliamentary delegation led by MP Rashela Mizrahi, chair of the North Macedonia–Israel Parliamentary Friendship Group, conducted a return visit to the Knesset in Israel to strengthen inter-parliamentary relations and discuss bilateral cooperation. During the visit, members of the delegation met with the Speaker of the Knesset and other Israeli officials and exchanged views on current political and regional issues, reflecting ongoing efforts to deepen ties between the two countries’ legislatures.

== Jews in North Macedonia ==
The existence of Jews in North Macedonia dates back to antiquity.

Today the Jewish community in North Macedonia is a small, but highly respected community, which serves as a bridge of communication between North Macedonia and Israel. It numbers about 200 people, of which most of them live in the capital Skopje, but also in the town of Štip.

The Jewish organizations of North Macedonia have expressed on several occasions that there is no antisemitism in North Macedonia. After a meeting with the new ambassador from Israel to North Macedonia at the end of 2009, they told him that North Macedonia might be the only country where antisemitism cannot be noticed and that the Jews in North Macedonia feel secure, having the feeling to live in a country that loves Jews and has very good relations with Israel.

The Jewish community of North Macedonia has a strong connection to the Jewish community in Serbia and maintains long and close relations with the American Jewish Committee.

In 2002, North Macedonia became one of few countries that has settled claims against heirless Jewish properties, by adopting a resolution that resolved outstanding Jewish communal property claims.

The Government of the Republic of North Macedonia built a Holocaust Memorial Center in North Macedonia's capital Skopje, which is one of the biggest Holocaust memorial centers in the world. The State of Israel highly appreciates that kind of nourishing the Holocaust memory and testimonies of the Jewish presence in the country.

=== Jews of North Macedonia in Israel ===
A small-medium Jewish community of North Macedonia has a very long presence in the Mediterranean coast, especially in Gush Dan and in the Northern Israel.

== See also ==
- Foreign relations of Israel
- Foreign relations of North Macedonia
- History of the Jews in North Macedonia
- List of ambassadors of Israel to North Macedonia
