= List of international presidential trips made by Gjorge Ivanov =

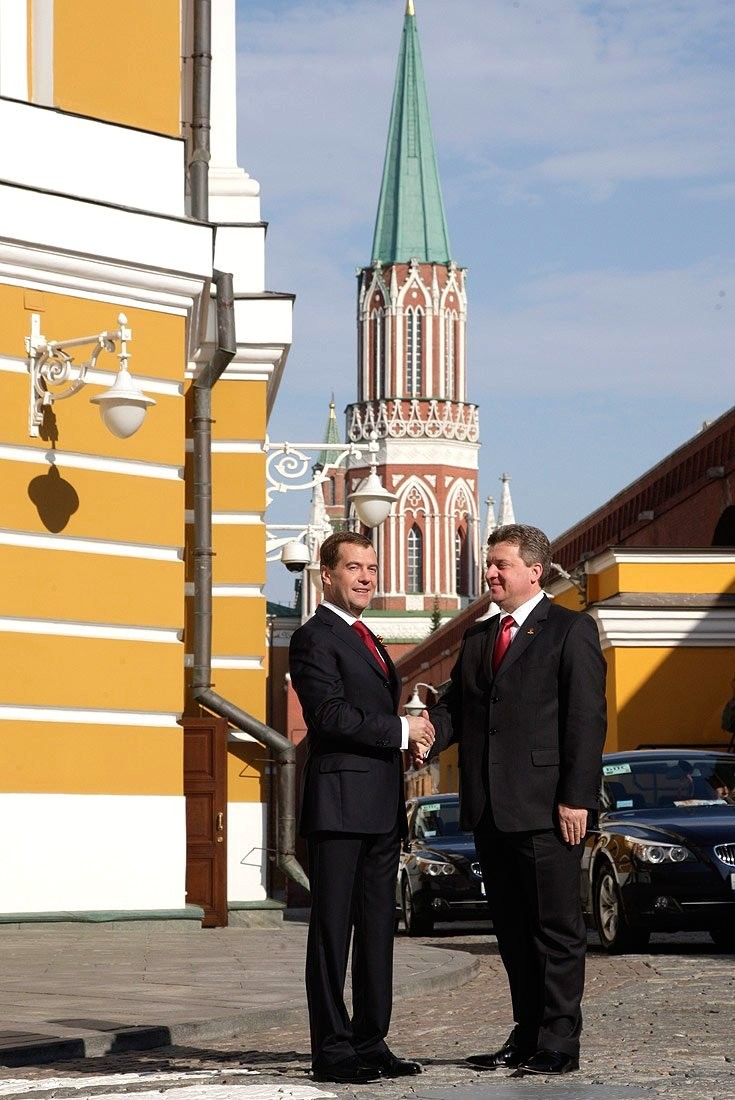
Ivanov with Dmitry Medvedev during his visit to Moscow on May 9, 2010, where he was due to attend the 2010 Moscow Victory Day Parade.

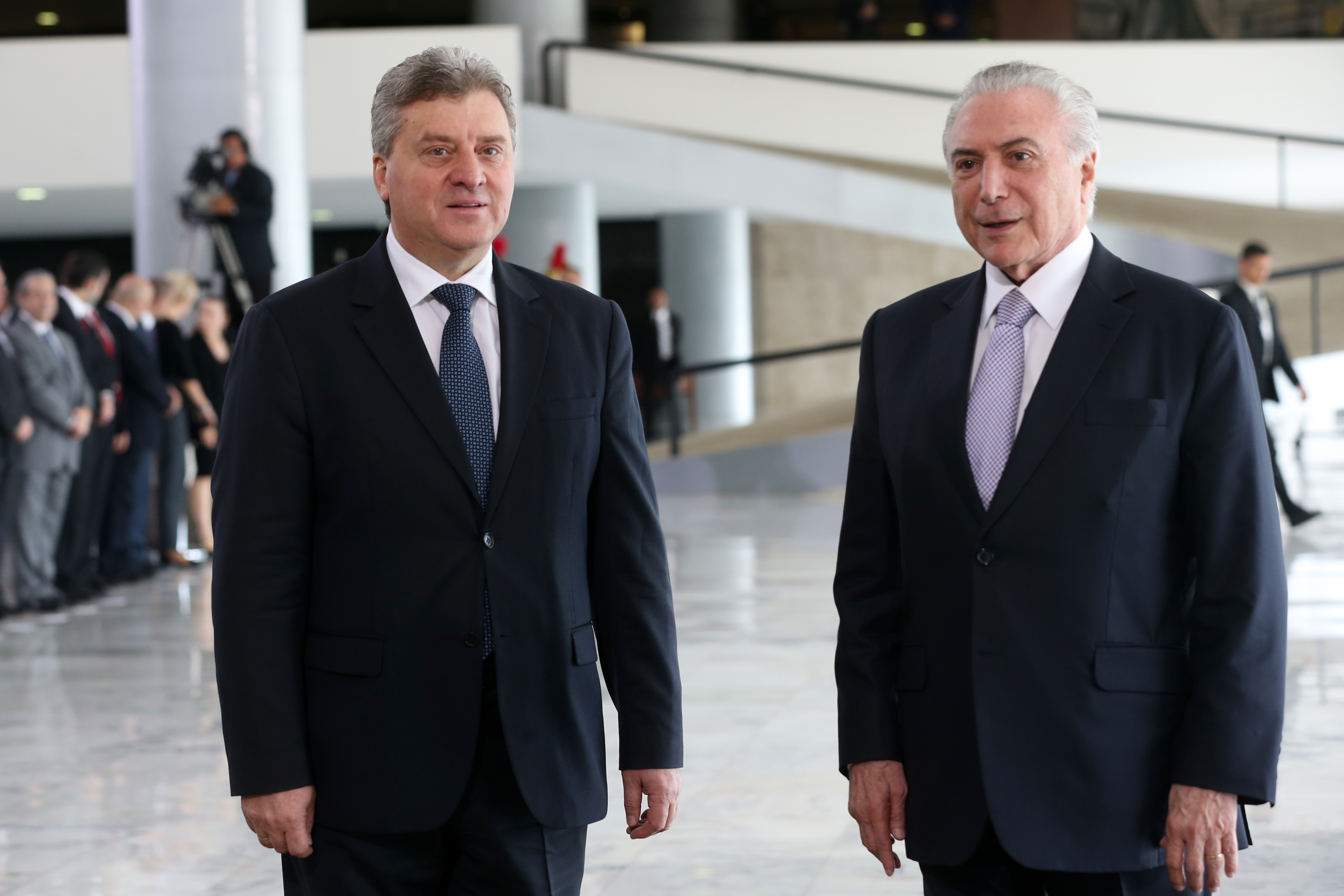
Ivanov with Brazilian President Michel Temer during his visit to Brasillia in December 2017.

This is a list of state visits made by Gjorge Ivanov, the President of (North) Macedonia from 2009 to 2019.

== List of State Visits ==
Date	Country	Cities visited	Note
May 2009	Slovenia	Ljubljana	Official State Visit
May 2010	Russia	Moscow	Celebration of 65th anniversary of Victory in Great Patriotic War
November 18, 2009	Serbia	Belgrade	Funeral of Patriarch Pavle
February 2010	Ukraine	Kyiv	Inauguration of Viktor Yanukovych
February 2010	Croatia	Zagreb	Inauguration of Ivo Josipovic
July 2010	Switzerland	Bern	Official State Visit
July 2010	Bosnia and Herzegovina	Srebrenica	15 years of Srebrenica massacre
October 2010	Estonia	Tallinn	Official State Visit
October 2010	Serbia	Belgrade	Official State Visit
November 2010	Montenegro	Podgorica	Official State Visit
December 2010	Italy	Rome	Official State Visit
February 2011	Slovenia	Ljubljana	Official State Visit
February 2011	Czech Republic	Prague	Official State Visit
February 2011	Bosnia and Herzegovina	Mostar, Sarajevo	Commemorating 7 years of the death of President Trajkovski
March 2011	Albania	Tirana	Official State Visit
April 2011	Hungary	Budapest	Official State Visit
May 2011	Vatican City	Vatican City	Beatification of Pope John Paul II
June 2011	Italy	Rome	150 anniversary of the unification of Italy
June 2011	Austria	Vienna	Official State Visit
October 2011	Romania	Bucharest	Official State Visit
October 2011	Croatia	Zagreb	Official State Visit
December 2011	Czech Republic	Prague	Funeral of Vaclav Havel
February 2012	Turkey	Ankara	Official State Visit
April 2012	Lithuania	Vilnius	Official State Visit
April 2012	Latvia	Riga	Official State Visit
June 2012	Azerbaijan	Baku	Crans-Montana Forum
July 2012	United Kingdom	London	Opening ceremony of Summer Olympic Games
October 2012	Bosnia and Herzegovina	Sarajevo	Official State Visit
January 2013	Qatar	Doha	Official State Visit
March 2013	Vatican City	Vatican City	Inauguration of Pope Francis
July 2013	Croatia	Zagreb	Formal reception for Croatia's accession to the EU
October 2013	China	Beijing	Official State Visit
December 2013	Austria	Vienna	Official State Visit
February 2014	Russia	Moscow	Official State Visit
February 2014	Bosnia and Herzegovina	Mostar, Sarajevo	Commemorating 10 years of the death of President Trajkovski
February 2014	Czech Republic	Prague	Official State Visit
May 2014	Italy/	Rome	Official State Visit
May 2014	Vatican City	Rome	Official State Visit
June 2014	Ukraine	Kyiv	Inauguration of Petro Poroshenko
June 2014	Bosnia and Herzegovina	Sarajevo	Celebration of 100 years from the assassination of the Archduke Franz Ferdinand
August 2014	Turkey	Ankara	Inauguration of Recep Tayyip Erdoğan
October 2014	Switzerland	Bern	Official State Visit
November 2014	Serbia	Belgrade	Official State Visit
January 15–16, 2015	Qatar	Doha	Opening of World Men's Handball Championship
January 27, 2015	Poland	Auschwitz	70th anniversary of the liberation of the concentration camp Auschwitz-Birkenau
February 1, 2015	Bulgaria	Sofia	Funeral of Zhelyu Zhelev
February 15, 2015	Croatia	Zagreb	Inauguration of Kolinda Grabar Kitarovic
March, 2015	Morocco	Dakhla	Crans-Montana Forum
April 2–3, 2015	Albania	Tirana, Pustec	Official visit
April, 2015	Azerbaijan	Baku	Crans-Montana Forum
July 6–7, 2015	Croatia	Zagreb	Official State Visit
July 11, 2015	Bosnia and Herzegovina	Srebrenica	20 years of Srebrenica genocide
September 15–16, 2015	Montenegro	Cetinje, Podgorica	Official State Visit
October 31, 2015	Holy See	Vatican	Official State Visit
March 20, 2017	Hungary	Budapest	Working Visit
May 23–24, 2017	Russia	Moscow	Working Visit
December 7, 2017	Monaco	Monaco City	Working Visit
December 11–12, 2017	Brazil	Brasília	Official State Visit
February 19–20, 2018	Turkey	Ankara	Official State Visit
June 14–15, 2018	Bulgaria	Sofia	Official State Visit
July 17–18, 2018	Moldova	Chișinău	Official State Visit
October 4–05, 2018	Czech Republic	Prague	Official State Visit

== State visits hosted in Macedonia by Gjorge Ivanov ==
Country	Name	Title	Date
Estonia	Toomas Hendrik Ilves	President	October 13–14, 2009
Croatia	Stjepan Mesic	President	December 3, 2009
Albania	Bamir Topi	President	April 15–16, 2010
Romania	Traian Băsescu	President	May 27, 2010
Czech Republic	Vaclav Klaus	President	June 21–22, 2010
Latvia	Valdis Zatlers	President	July 14–15, 2010
Croatia	Ivo Josipovic	President	July 12, 2010
Kosovo	Behgjet Pacolli	President	March 23–24, 2011
Albania	Bamir Topi	President	July 11–12, 2011
Kosovo	Atifete Jahjaga	President	July 11–12, 2011
Montenegro	Filip Vujanović	President	July 11–12, 2011
Qatar	Hamad bin Khalifa Al Thani	Emir	October 17–18, 2011
Bosnia and Herzegovina	Zeljko Komsic	President of the presidency	October 24–25, 2011
Serbia	Boris Tadic	President	December 16–17, 2011
Montenegro	Filip Vujanovic	President	March 16–17, 2012
Albania	Bamir Topi	President	April 19–20, 2012
United Nations	Ban Ki-moon	General Secretary	July 24, 2012
Albania	Bujar Nishani	President	September 14, 2012
Serbia	Tomislav Nikolic	President	October 26–28, 2012
Slovenia	Borut Pahor	President	July 16–17, 2013
Croatia	Ivo Josipovic	President	September 3–04, 2013
Poland	Bronisław Komorowski	President	September 10–11, 2013
Albania	Edi Rama	Prime Minister	November 5, 2013
Turkey	Recep Tayyip Erdoğan	Prime Minister	September 29, 2011
Vietnam	Nguyễn Thị Doan	Vice President	November 2, 2014
Croatia	Kolinda Grabar-Kitarović	President	April 12–13, 2016
Slovenia	Borut Pahor	President	April 12–13, 2016
Czech Republic	Milos Zeman	President	June 9–10, 2016
Bosnia and Herzegovina	Mladen Ivanic	President of the presidency	April 19–20, 2017
Albania	Ilir Meta	President	November 20–21, 2017
Bulgaria	Rumen Radev	President	February 16–17, 2018
Croatia	Kolinda Grabar-Kitarović	President	April 27, 2018
Bosnia and Herzegovina	Bakir Izetbegović	President of the presidency	April 27, 2018
Serbia	Aleksandar Vučić	President	April 27, 2018
Bulgaria	Boyko Borisov	Prime Minister	April 27, 2018
Albania	Ilir Meta	President	April 27, 2018
European Union	Donald Tusk	President	April 27, 2018
Kosovo	Hashim Thaçi	President	April 27, 2018
Montenegro	Filip Vujanović	President	April 27, 2018
Slovenia	Borut Pahor	President	April 27, 2018
