= North Macedonia–Serbia relations =

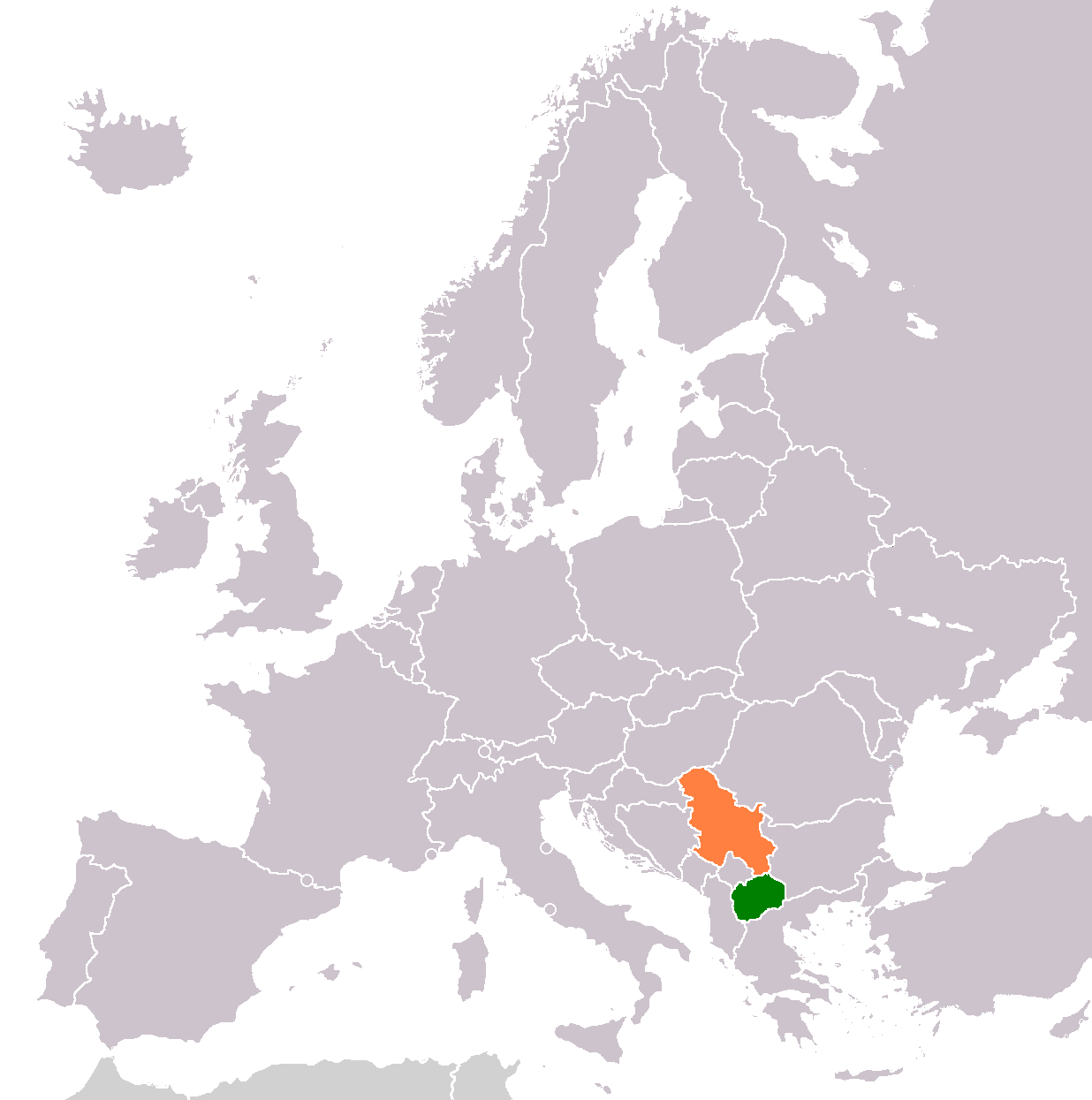

- North Macedonia: Serbia

North Macedonia and Serbia maintain diplomatic relations established between North Macedonia and the Federal Republic of Yugoslavia (of which Serbia is considered sole legal successor) in 1996.

== History ==
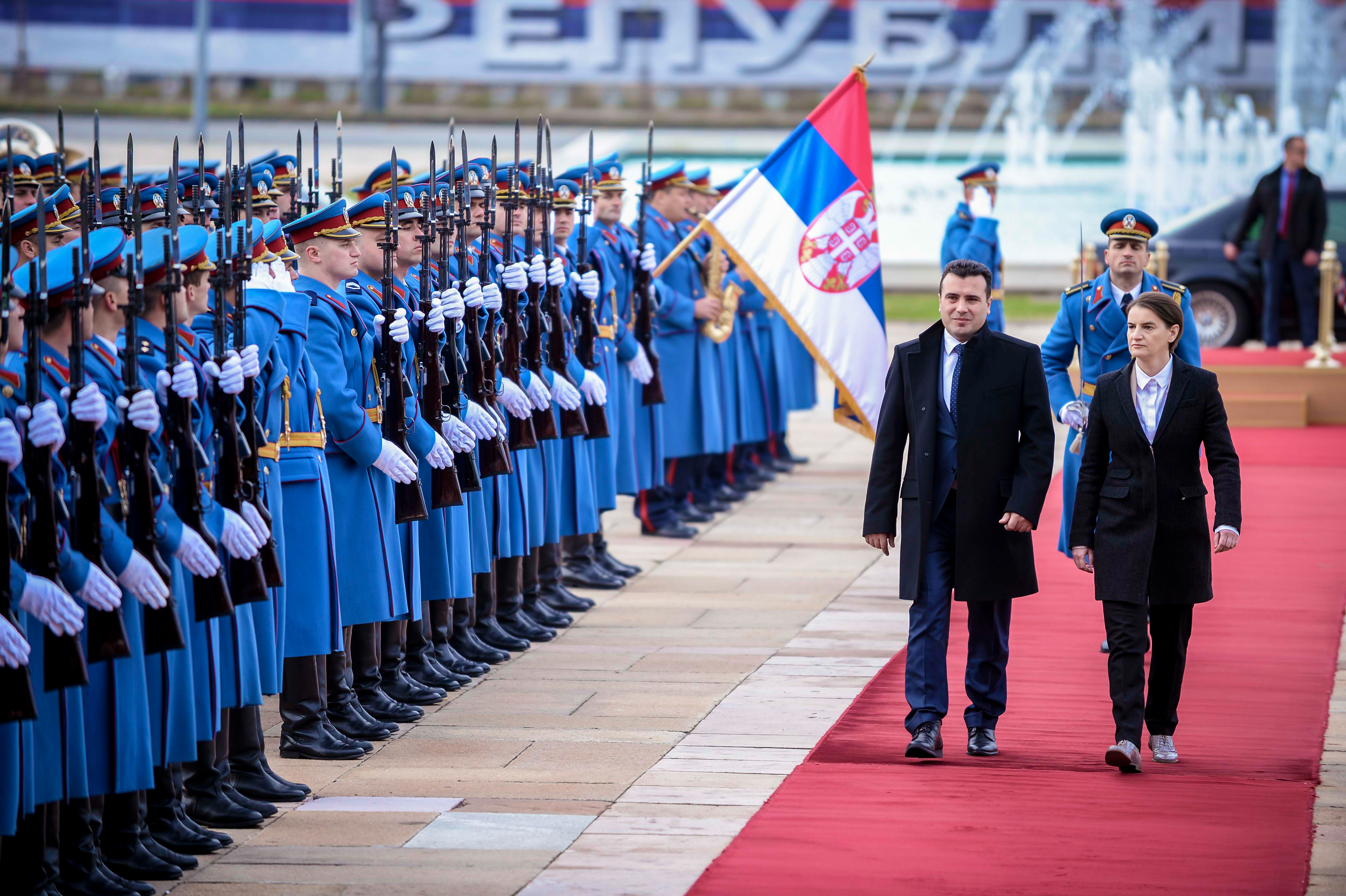
Zoran Zaev, Prime Minister of North Macedonia, and Ana Brnabić, Prime Minister of Serbia, in Belgrade, 2017

Both countries were constituent republics within the Socialist Federal Republic of Yugoslavia. Following the declaration of independence of the then-Republic of Macedonia in 1991, the Yugoslav People's Army peacefully left the Republic of Macedonia, therefore it was the only former Yugoslav republic that gained independence without conflict or war.

The Federal Republic of Yugoslavia was formed in 1992 by the remaining Yugoslav republics Montenegro and Serbia. However, bilateral relations were not established immediately but only in 1996. The establishment of bilateral relations was conducted under the country's constitutional name - Republic of Macedonia. Serbia, therefore, was one of 131 countries in the world that recognized the Republic of Macedonia under its constitutional name.

Following the Republic of Macedonia's recognition of Kosovo's independence in 2008, the ambassador of the Republic of Macedonia was expelled from Serbia. The break in relations lasted a few months. Both countries are part of the Open Balkan, an economic and political zone of three member states in the Balkans.

In 2021, Serbia donated 8,000 of their own Pfizer COVID-19 vaccines to North Macedonia, which were received by Prime Minister Zaev who described the act as "solidarity in practice". President Aleksandar Vučić stated on the occasion that Serbia's only interest with the donation is "friendship and that we may live as best friends".

The Serbian Orthodox Church for many years blocked the visits of state delegations from North Macedonia to the Prohor Pčinjski Monastery in southern Serbia on North Macedonia's Day of the Republic, the place where the foundations of North Macedonia's statehood were laid during World War II at the first plenary session of ASNOM.

A 2022 poll found that the citizens of North Macedonia consider Serbia to be their favorite neighboring country.

== Issue of the autocephaly of the Macedonian Orthodox Church ==
The Serbian Orthodox Church did not recognize the Macedonian Orthodox Church, which declared autocephaly from the Serbian church in 1967. In 2022, the church dispute was resolved when the Serbian Orthodox Church restored Macedonian Orthodox Church under its previous autonomous status and later granted it autocephaly.

== Economic relations ==
Trade between two countries amounted to $1.5 billion in 2023; Serbia's merchandise export to North Macedonia were over $1 billion; North Macedonia's exports were standing at $462 million.

Serbian public telecommunications company Telekom Srbija is the owner of MTEL which is one of three telecom operators in North Macedonia.

== Serbs in North Macedonia ==
Serbs in North Macedonia are recognized ethnic minority group. As of the 2021 Census, 23,847 individuals self-identified as ethnic Serbs and 11,252 declared their mother tongue as Serbian. They are mostly concentrated along the northern border with Serbia (rural parts of municipalities of Staro Nagoričane and, to a lesser degree, Kumanovo) and in Čučer-Sandevo municipality in the region of Skopska Crna Gora - which is municipality with the highest percentage of Serbs in the country (roughly 21% of the population).

== Macedonians in Serbia ==
Macedonians in Serbia are recognized ethnic minority group. According to data form the 2022 census, 14,767 self-identified as ethnic Macedonians, constituting 0.2% of the country's population. They are predominately concentrated in South Banat where they were colonized after the World War II. Macedonians form significant part of populations (although far from majority) in three villages (Jabuka, Glogonj, and Kačarevo) in the administrative area of city of Pančevo as well as in the village of Dužine, in municipality of Plandište.

== Resident diplomatic missions ==
- North Macedonia has an embassy in Belgrade.
- Serbia has an embassy in Skopje.
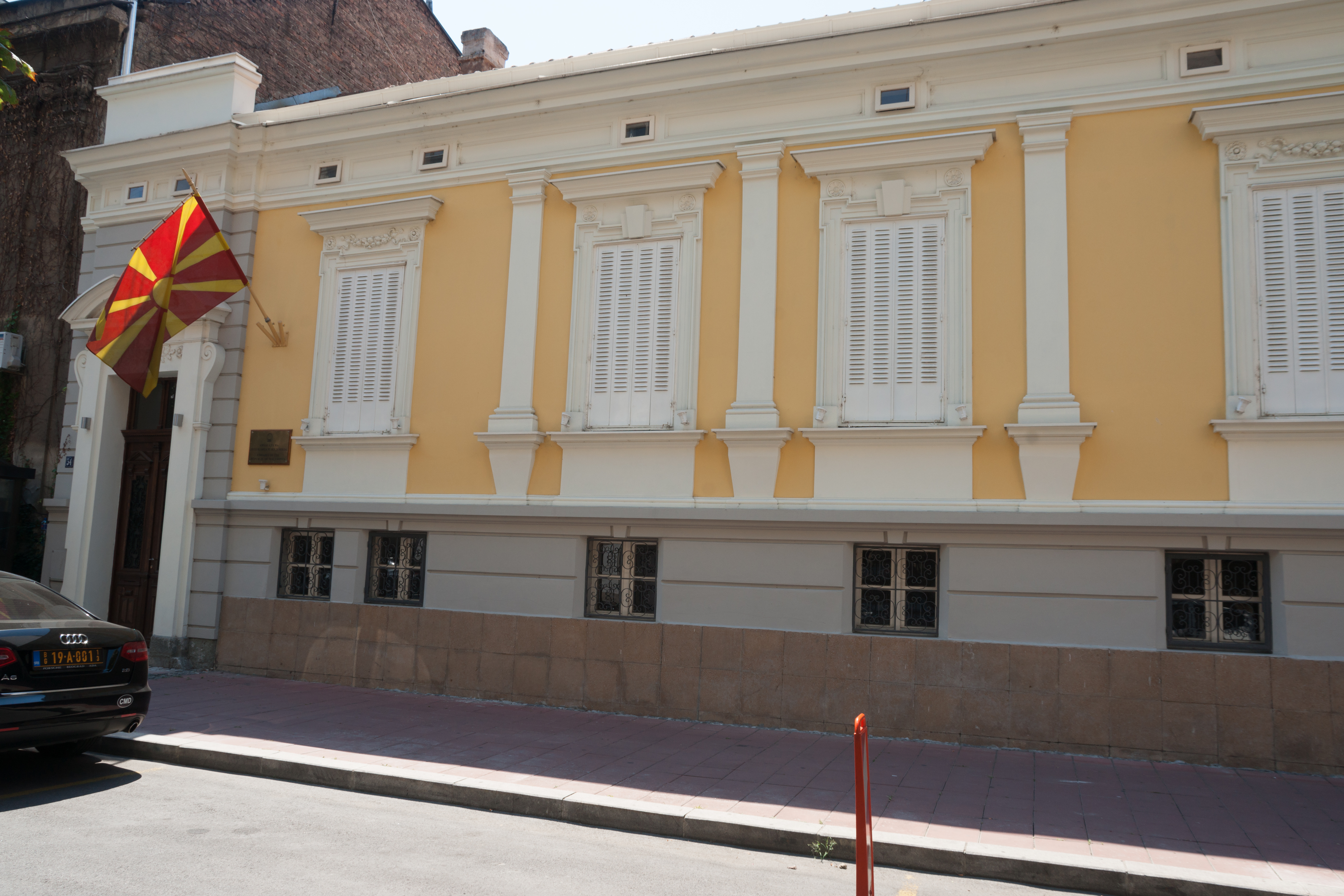
Embassy of North Macedonia in Belgrade

== See also ==
- Foreign relations of North Macedonia
- Foreign relations of Serbia
- Agreement on Succession Issues of the Former Socialist Federal Republic of Yugoslavia
