= Macedonian Center for International Cooperation =

- Formation: 1993
- Headquarters: Skopje
- Website: www.mcms.mk

The Macedonian Center for International Cooperation (MCIC) is a civil society organisation that promotes social change and innovative solutions to civic and social challenges. Instituted on 14 December 1993 in Skopje, the Republic of Macedonia, with support from Dutch Interchurch Aid (DIA) and the World Council of Churches (WCC), MCIC was developed in response to social issues arising from the balkanization of Yugoslavia. MCIC has since developed as an independent, civic, non-profit organisation ready to face social challenges and create models or alternatives for resolving related problems.

Since its establishment, MCIC has implemented more than 1,300 projects as part of 60 programs, amounting to over 45 million euros in the following sectors: water supply and sanitation, rural development, health and education, employment and civil society, democratization, trust, immediate aid and activity in the Balkans.

Following initial loan-based development, MCIC established the Macedonian Enterprise Development Foundation (MEDF), whose focus is the growth of small enterprises through provided access to financial and non-financial services. MEDF has since supported over 3,500 entrepreneurs with loans as well as non-financial services. MCIC has further supported the development of rural communities by strengthening their capacity for internal problem resolution. As a result of this support, 250 villages in the Republic of Macedonia now have access to drinking water.

MCIC undertook the role of mediator during the conflicts in Kosovo (1999) and Macedonia (2001), mobilizing civil society in providing humanitarian response to the crisis. This period directed MCIC to post-conflict activities and confidence building as well as activities outside Macedonia. Regional cooperation peaked with the establishment of the Balkan Civil Society Development Network (BCSDN).

== Work methods ==
=== Consultations and Trainings ===
MCIC, since its foundation in 1993, has been active in the field of capacity development, on an individual, organizational and institutional level. MCIC employs this approach in order to strengthen the capacities of civil society organizations, local self-governments, state institutions, enterprises, schools and other organizations requiring capacity building. The topics for which MCIC develops capacity encompasses: project cycle management, organizational management, institutional development and organizational strengthening, strategic planning, program/project management, human resources management, administrative and archive operations, financial management, public relations, communication skills, facilitation and presentation skills, training of trainers, intercultural learning, etc.

=== Awareness Raising and Campaigns ===
MCIC has run public awareness campaigns to facilitate support on specific issues. MCIC's first campaign is one of the most well-known: "Whole is when there is everything!" (1999 and 2000). The campaign aimed to promote peace and human values. It used simple messages to communicate the values of life. Other campaigns followed: "I live here" (2003); "Say Macedonia" (2004); "Easter Campaign" (2005 – continuation of Say Macedonia); "Say OK to MK" (2005); "Next to Each Other – Different but Equal" (2007) and "Both NATO and Macedonia" (2008).

=== Research and Publications ===
One of MCIC’s methods is advocacy, understood as raising awareness and education, influencing public policy, and monitoring and requesting accountability. MCIC conducts its research by means of its own resources or through external associates in the form of primary or secondary research. Depending on the subject, the research may use various instruments such as questionnaires, in-depth interviews, content analysis, case studies, and statistical analysis. MCIC publishes its research. It also publishes many other publications, predominantly related to the main topics in which it is active.
