= 1st Mechanized Infantry Brigade (North Macedonia) =

- 1ва Механизирана Пешадиска Бригада
- Flag of 1st Mechanized Infantry Brigade
- Active: 2 April 2007
- Country: North Macedonia
- Branch: Joint Operational Command
- Type: Mechanized infantry
- Size: Brigade
- Part of: Army of North Macedonia
- Garrison/HQ: Skopje
- Mottos: Strength and Honor
- Engagements: (Islamic Republic of Afghanistan) Afghanistan (Former); Lebanon; Iraq; Bosnia and Herzegovina

The 1st Mechanized Infantry Brigade (MIB) is a mechanized infantry higher joint tactical unit that represents a major combat force of the Army of North Macedonia. It provides forces for protection, national interest, support during natural disasters, epidemics and other dangers. Outside North Macedonia, the declared units participate in peacekeeping operations and fulfill international military responsibilities.

== History ==
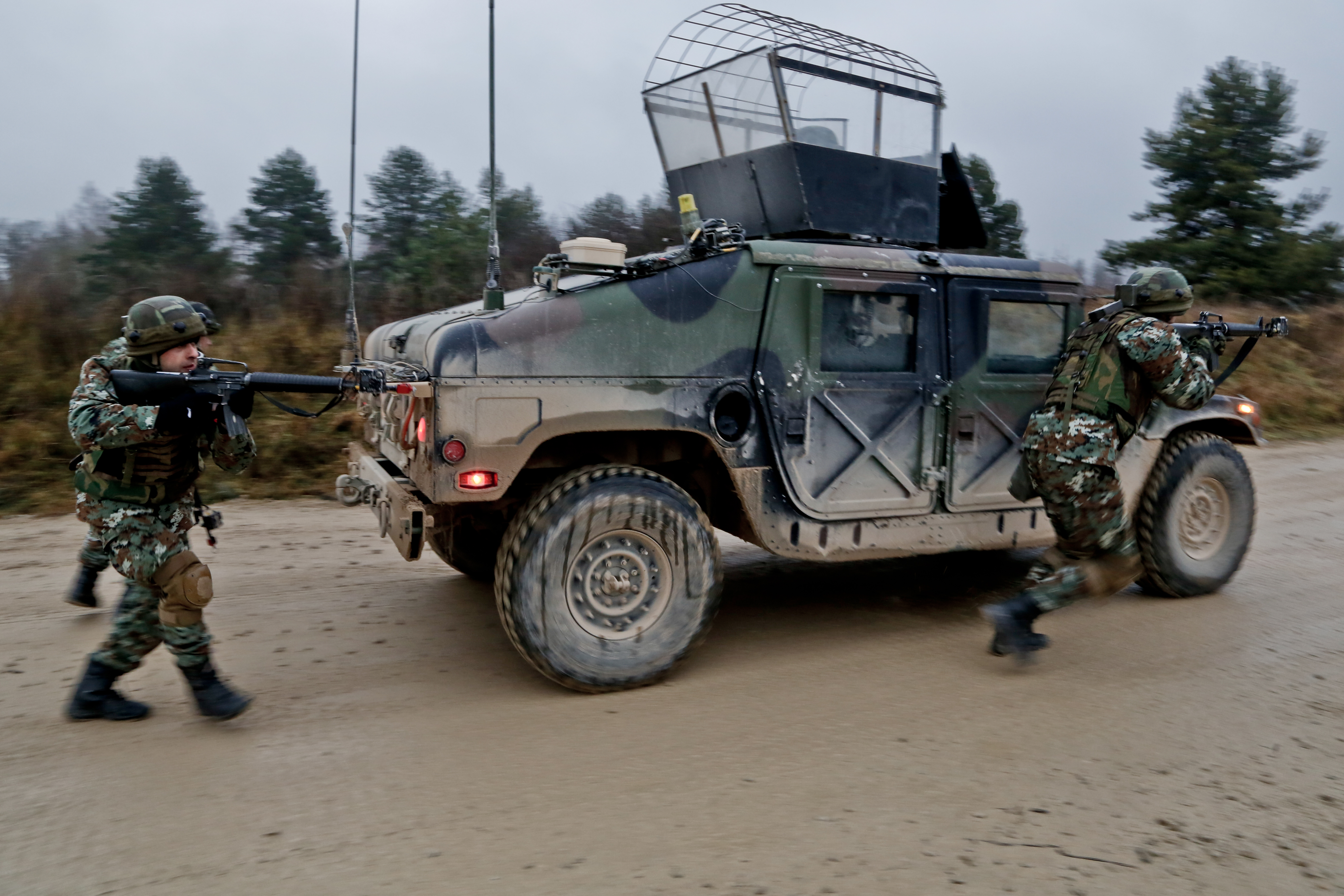
Hohenfels, Germany, Training Area

The 1st Mechanized Infantry Brigade's predecessor was the 14th MMNABr, which was formed on 18 September 1944 to repel fascists troops, where they conducted an operation in Vinica

Following this, they advanced toward Kochani, Shtip, and Sveti Nikole. Later in the war, the brigade participated in the operation to capture Skopje and engaged enemy forces near Tetovo. On January 12, 1945, it fought on the Sremski Front in the area between Šid and the Danube River, where it sustained considerable losses. On May 26, it operated near Celje, Slovenia, and on its return, it was involved in battles in Bosnia and Herzegovina. On June 15, 1945, the brigade entered Skopje in a parade, marking the conclusion of its combat operations.

The 1st Mechanized Infantry Brigade is the successor of this famous unit and it carries out its tradition. The 1st Mechanized Infantry Brigade is directly connected with the formation of the Army of the independent Republic of Macedonia. The first servicemen in ARM were from this unit. During the past years the brigade went through a process of transformation and now it is defined as a small, modern, mobile and professional unit prepared to cope with all the challenges of the modern time.

The personnel and the units of the 1st Mechanized Infantry Brigade have participated at many courses, seminars, military exercises and international peace keeping missions in country and abroad. The gained knowledge was implemented in the preparation of the personnel to take part in the peace keeping missions in Afghanistan, Iraq, Bosnian and Lebanon.

The first biggest contingent from this brigade (sized an infantry company) was deployed to the ISAF mission in Afghanistan. The same unit has successfully participated in military exercises "Macedonian Flash" 1, 3, 4, 5 and 6 and has conducted NATO self-evaluation level 1 and level 2 according to NATO concept for operational abilities.

On 18 August 2007 the Brigade was awarded a "Decoration for merit" given by the President of (then) Republic of Macedonia.

== Tasks ==
- Preparation for combat operations of the forces for conducting offensive and defensive operations;
- Performing tactical marches;
- Planning and implementation of continuous training for combat terrorist groups;
- Planning and implementation of continuous training of commands and units of the 1st MIB according to NATO standards and procedures, and ensuring full implementation of the system for management training and leadership development and training for instructors;
- Giving support to the forces of the Ministry of Interior in dealing with the threats, risks and threats to the security of Republic of Macedonia;
- Providing support to the state government, local governments, citizens and non-governmental organizations and institutions in dealing with natural disasters and epidemics, tactical and technological and other disasters;
- Rapid deployment of forces in multinational joint operations led by NATO or in peace keeping operations led by NATO, the UN and the EU;
- Readiness of the Middle Infantry Battalion Group (MIBG) for NATO-led operations;
- Training and readiness of the company declared in the forces of EUBG;
- Participation and assistance in humanitarian operations in the region and beyond;
- Developing the ability to defend the forces from improvised explosive devices;
- Implementation of effective command, control and safety communication skills;
- Survival and protection of forces in conditions of close combat, threats from chemical, biological, radioactive and nuclear weapons.

== Missions ==
Within the peace keeping mission ISAF in Afghanistan our unit has participated with two rotations (January and July). During an ongoing mission a preparations for the next mission are conducted. We have participated in ISAF with a Mechanized Infantry Company for securing the base and the staff personnel. The whole personnel of these units are under JOC operative command.

The benefit ARM gained from the participation in ISAF mission is that the lessons learned will be used in the future. For Republic of Macedonia, to have highly trained and professional soldiers, who in the last decades, have greatly contributed to the image of the ISAF mission and the Alliance is a great honor. Republic of Macedonia and its citizens are proud of the ARM servicemen who are not only the guards of the state sovereignty, but are ambassadors of the peace together with their NATO colleagues who have contributed to the development of the democracy in Afghanistan.

== Structure ==
=== 1st Mechanized Infantry Battalion ===
Mission: To prepare and organize the defence and protection of the territorial integrity and sovereignty and independence of the Republic. To assist, within it area of operation, the MIA during operations if the security of the country is endangered. To support the state authorities, the local government and various institutions and organizations as well as the citizens when dealing with natural disasters, epidemics, technical and technological catastrophes in its area of operation. To take part in peace keeping missions and conflicts prevention NATO, UN, OSCE and EU led activities. To contribute to dealing with regional conflicts and crises as well as to protect the wider interests of the Republic.

Tasks: To alert, move, transport and rapidly deploy the units to places, areas and regions; To plan, organize and conduct offensive and defensive operations and urban area operations; To control the territory, to seal directions and to secure regions; To give combat-service supports to the units in peace time, during crisis and war; To conduct command and control; To support MIA when dealing with threats, risks and dangers for the security of the Republic; To support the state authorities and local government units when dealing with natural disasters, epidemics and technical and technological catastrophes; To take part in peace keeping missions and conflicts prevention missions abroad and to protect wider interests of the Republic.

=== 2nd Mechanized Infantry Battalion ===
Mission: To conduct offensive and defensive operations in order to protect the integrity and sovereignty of the territory North Macedonia; To cooperate with MIA in the area of border guard; To support civilian government when alleviating the aftermaths of natural and other disasters; To support peacekeeping operations and humanitarian operations out of R. of North Macedonia; Combat readiness level has been reached and maintained making progress in many areas, primarily training and preparing for TELA; Battalion units have completely reached the necessary combat readiness level.

Tasks: Personnel physical readiness; Firearms training of individuals and units; Training according to BMP; Specialized –professional training; Personnel training for peacekeeping missions participation; English language training.

2nd Mechanized Infantry Battalion was formed in 1996 under the name of "Scorpions" as a unit of the 11th Infantry Brigade.Since it was formed up to present moment the battalion has taken part in 24 international exercises organized by NATO PfP countries. It contributed with personnel and technique and represented ARM and Republic of North Macedonia.

=== 3rd Mechanized Infantry Battalion ===
Mission: To prepare and organize the defence and protection of the territorial integrity and sovereignty and independence of the Republic of North Macedonia. To assist, within it area of operation, the MIA during operations if the security of the country is endangered. To support the state authorities, the local government and various institutions and organizations as well as the citizens when dealing with natural disasters, epidemics, technical and technological catastrophes in its area of operation. To take part in peace keeping missions and conflicts prevention NATO, UN, OSCE and EU led activities. To contribute to dealing with regional conflicts and crises as well as to protect the wider interests of the North Macedonia.

Tasks: To alert, move, transport and rapidly deploy the units to places, areas and regions To plan, organize and conduct offensive and defensive operations and urban area operations To control the territory, to seal directions and to secure regions To give combat-service supports to the units in peace time, during crisis and war To conduct command and control To support MIA when dealing with threats, risks and dangers for the security of the North Macedonia To support the state authorities and local government units when dealing with natural disasters, epidemics and technical and technological catastrophes To take part in peace keeping missions and conflicts prevention missions abroad and to protect wider interests of RM To plan and conduct personnel and commands training according to NATO standards and procedures and to fully implement the system for training management, to develop leaders – training instructors.

=== Combat Service Support Battalion ===
Mission: Combat Service Support Battalion is a unit within the 1st Infantry Brigade with the task of conducting offensive and defensive operations for defence and security of the territorial integrity and sovereignty of the Republic; Cooperation with MIA in securing the borders; Support to civilian authorities in eliminating consequences of natural disasters and catastrophes, and Participation in peace support and humanitarian missions abroad.

Tasks: To prepare for combat tasks; Tactical march; To take firing positions; Tactical movement; To conduct defence tasks; To conduct attacks; To conduct tasks for fighting against sabotage terroristic groups, and To take part in peace support operations abroad.

=== Artillery Battalion ===
Mission: To prepare its fire support forces for the units of the 1st mib, for defense and protection of the territorial integrity and sovereignty of the Republic of North Macedonia in all weather and field conditions, preparation of the declared unit habt 105 mm for operations in support of peace and prevention of conflicts and crises in operations led by NATO, UN, OSCE, EU and other international alliances and to contribute to the protection of the wider interests of the Republic of North Macedonia.

Tasks: Alerting the unit and taking possession of areas and positions Tactical Movement and taking possession of fire positions and areas Coordination of the fire support and artillery fire management Conducting and maintaining command and control Implementation of combat support Performing mobilization and rapid integration of the active members Preparation of the declared unit Providing support to the government, the local government units, the citizens and the non-governmental organizations and institutions in dealing with natural disasters and epidemics – technical technological and other disasters Planning and carrying out training to achieve NATO standards.

=== Engineer Battalion ===
Mission: Prepared to give engineer support to the commands and units of ARM. Prepared to cooperate with the units of the MoI in crisis situations, gives support to the civil authorities in case of disasters and other crisis, as well as provides support to help authorities deal with consequences of natural disasters and armed conflicts.

Tasks: Plans, organises and conducts engineer reconnaissance, Performs tactical march, Maintains the facilities for protection and carries out activities for the needs of the commands and units of ARM, Prepares and eliminates smaller explosive obstacles and prepares and deals with artificial obstacles, Secures the movement and maneuver of the Combat Service Support units (CSS), Prepares and eliminates smaller explosive obstacles and eliminates artificial obstacles in cooperation with MOI units in case of crisis, Conducts humanitarian and logistic operations supporting the civil authorities in case of danger and helps them deal with the consequences of natural disasters and armed conflicts, Assists civil authorities in reconstructing infrastructure damaged during natural disasters and armed conflicts.

=== Military Intelligence Company ===
Mission: To provide crucial intelligence support to military operations.

Tasks: Primary task of the company is to collect, analyze, and disseminate intelligence to commanders, enabling informed decision-making during training and operations.

=== Signal Company ===
Mission: The Signal Company establishes all connections scheduled for the needs of the 1st Mechanized Infantry Brigade under the Signal Plan "BRAN".

History: The signal company is part of the 1st Mechanized Infantry Brigade and is located in the barracks "N.H. - Petrovec". Its beginning was in September 2000 in the barracks "Jane Sandanski" - Shtip where it becomes a part of 1st Infantry Brigade (1st IB) under the motto "Honor and Strength". First commander of the brigade was Captain Zoranco Trenev, who after several years with the transformation in 1st infantry brigade into 1st Mechanized Infantry Brigade (1st MIB) in March 2006 was replaced by the next company commander Captain Zoran Aleksov.

Tasks:

- Alert and unit assembly.
- Tactical march.
- Establishment and maintenance of all scheduled connections.
- Force protection.

== Equipment ==
Name	Type	Caliber	Origin
CZ 75	Pistol	9×19mm	Czechoslovakia
CZ-99	Pistol	9×19mm	Yugoslavia
Zastava M70	Assault rifle	7.62×39mm	Yugoslavia
Zastava M84	Machine gun	7.62×54mm	Yugoslavia
MG3	Machine gun	7.92×57mm	Germany
Zastava M93	Sniper rifle	12.7mm	Serbia
Zastava M76	Sniper rifle	7.92×57mm	Yugoslavia
SVD Dragunov	Sniper rifle	7.62×54mm	Soviet Union
Zastava BGA 30	Grenade launcher	30mm	Serbia
RBG-6	Grenade launcher	40mm	Croatia
Milan ATGM	ATGM	115mm	France
M80 Zolja	Man-portable missile	64mm	Yugoslavia
M79 Osa	Man-portable missile	90mm	Yugoslavia

== See also ==
- Army of the Republic of North Macedonia
- North Macedonia Air Force
- Special Operations Regiment
- The Rangers Battalion
- Ceremonial Guard Battalion
- Military Reserve Force (North Macedonia)
- Military Service for Security and Intelligence
- North Macedonia
