= Military ranks of North Macedonia =

The Military ranks of North Macedonia are the ranks used by the Army of the Republic of North Macedonia. The ranks are divided into four main groups, depending on the position and function: Generals, officers, non-commissioned officers and soldiers. Being a landlocked country, North Macedonia does not have a navy.

The current system of ranks and insignia was introduced in 1991 thus replacing the former Yugoslav People's Army insignia, on which it is based.

== Commissioned officer ranks ==
The rank insignia of commissioned officers.

NATO code	OF-10	OF-9	OF-8	OF-7	OF-6	OF-5	OF-4	OF-3	OF-2	OF-1
North Macedonia Ground Forces
North Macedonia Ground Forces		Генерал; General	Генерал-потполковник; General-potpolkovnik	Генерал-мајор; General-major	Бригаден генерал Brigaden general	Полковник; Polkovnik	Потполковник; Potpolkovnik	Мајор; Major	Капетан; Kapetan	Поручник; Poručnik	Потпоручник; Potporučnik
North Macedonia Air Force
North Macedonia Air Force		Генерал; General	Генерал-потполковник; General-potpolkovnik	Генерал-мајор; General-major	Бригаден генерал Brigaden general	Полковник; Polkovnik	Потполковник; Potpolkovnik	Мајор; Major	Капетан; Kapetan	Поручник; Poručnik	Потпоручник; Potporučnik
NATO code	OF-10	OF-9	OF-8	OF-7	OF-6	OF-5	OF-4	OF-3	OF-2	OF-1

== Other ranks ==
The rank insignia of non-commissioned officers and enlisted personnel.

NATO code	OR-9	OR-8	OR-7	OR-6	OR-5	OR-4	OR-3		OR-2	OR-1
North Macedonia Ground Forces										No insignia
North Macedonia Ground Forces	Главен наредник Glaven narednik	Наредник; Narednik	Постар водник I класа Postar vodnik I klasa	Постар водник Postar vodnik	Водник 1 класа Vodnik 1 klasa	Водник; Vodnik	Помлад водник Pomlad vodnik	Десетар; Desetar	Разводник; Razvodnik	Војник; Vojnik
North Macedonia Air Force										No insignia
North Macedonia Air Force	Главен наредник Glaven narednik	Наредник; Narednik	Постар водник I класа Postar vodnik I klasa	Постар водник Postar vodnik	Водник 1 класа Vodnik 1 klasa	Водник; Vodnik	Помлад водник Pomlad vodnik	Десетар; Desetar	Разводник; Razvodnik	Војник; Vojnik
NATO code	OR-9	OR-8	OR-7	OR-6	OR-5	OR-4	OR-3		OR-2	OR-1

== Historic ranks ==
=== Commissioned officer ranks ===
The rank insignia of commissioned officers.

Rank group	General / flag officers				Senior officers			Junior officers
Macedonian Ground Forces (pre 2020)
Macedonian Ground Forces (pre 2020)	Генерал; General	Генерал потполковник General potpolkovnik	Генерал мајор General major	Бригаден генерал Brigaden general	Полковник; Polkovnik	Потполковник; Potpolkovnik	Мајор; Major	Капетан; Kapetan	Поручник; Poručnik	Потпоручник; Potporučnik

=== Other ranks ===
The rank insignia of non-commissioned officers and enlisted personnel.

Rank group	Senior NCOs				Junior NCOs			Enlisted
Macedonian Ground Forces (pre 2020)									No insignia
Macedonian Ground Forces (pre 2020)	Главен наредник Glaven narednik	Наредник; Narednik	Постар водник I класа Postar vodnik I klasa	Постар водник Postar vodnik	Водник; Vodnik	Помлад водник Pomlad vodnik	Десетар; Desetar	Разводник; Razvodnik	Војник; Vojnik
