= Special Operations Regiment (North Macedonia) =

- Полк за Специјални Операции
- Patch of Special Operations Regiment
- Active: 1 March 1994
- Country: North Macedonia
- Branch: Army of the Republic of North Macedonia
- Type: Special forces
- Size: Two battalions
- Engagements: Inside North Macedonia: 2001 insurgency in Macedonia; Operation MH-1; Aračinovo crisis; Battle of Tetovo; Vejce ambush; Outside North Macedonia; Iraq; Afghanistan; Lebanon; Bosnia and Herzegovina

Commanders
- Current commander: Brigadier General Metodi Hadji-Janev

The Special Operations Regiment (Macedonian: Полк за специјални операции, romanized: Polk za specijalni operacii) is the main special operations unit of the Army of North Macedonia. Under the command of the Special Operations Regiment are the Ranger Battalion as well as the Special Force Battalion "Wolves". The Wolves unit was formed on 1 March 1994. The Special Operations Regiment is responsible for defending the sovereignty and territorial integrity of North Macedonia from foreign hostiles. This unit is fully compatible with NATO standards.

== History ==
- On 1 March 1994 for the first time in the Army of the Republic of Macedonia a Special Purpose Unit was founded under the name of "the Wolves";
- It operated as Special Units Command from 2002 to 2003;
- In December 2003 with the decision of the Commander-in-Chief of the armed forces of the Republic of Macedonia the unit is restructured into Special Purpose Squad;
- In November 2006 the Unit is restructured into Special Operations Regiment (SOR).

== Mission ==
Provides fully organized, trained and equipped units for performing special operations and specific conventional operations, independently or in cooperation with other units of the ARM and other coalition forces, in all weather and land conditions in peacetime, crisis and war so as to support peace and to prevent conflict as part of the overall efforts to support internal security and foreign policy of North Macedonia.

== Missions outside North Macedonia ==
- Special Operations Regiment from June 2003 to June 2008 attended by 11 contingents of rotations in the "Iraqi Freedom"
- Participation in Peacekeeping "ISAF-Phoenix" in Afghanistan from May to December 2010
- Participation of individuals within the missions in Bosnia, Lebanon, Afghanistan and Central African Republic.

Received award:

- Order of Merit assigned to 14/08/2012, the President of the Republic of Macedonia, Mr. Dr. Ivanov marking the 20th anniversary of the establishment of the Army of Republic of Macedonia;
- Medal for bravery ........................ 6 members;
- "Bronze star" .................................. 8 members;
- "Achievement medal" ...................... 43 members;
- "ARCOM medal" ........................... 68 members;
- "NATO medal" .............................. 46 members;
- "Altea medal" ................................. 2 member.

== Special Forces Battalion “Wolves” ==
=== History ===
On 1 March 1994, Special Forces Unit (6th Squad), called ‘Wolves’ was founded within the Army of Republic of Macedonia for the first time. In 1998, the first team formation of the unit was formed and it was renamed into Special Forces Unit. In 2001 the unit became a part of CTU (Counter terrorism unit), and after founding SU Command, it became a part of it as a Squad. In 2003, the unit was reformed into Special Forces Battalion.

The forming of this unit has marked the process of becoming professional army for ARM. Since the beginning the candidates for joining this unit have been selected through special selection criteria and they are required to be physically and mentally prepared, regardless of the rank.

=== Foreign missions ===
Special Forces Battalion took part in several peacekeeping missions in Iraq, Afghanistan, Lebanon and Bosnia and Herzegovina. The servicemen of Special Operations Battalion were awarded with a large number of medals of courage, merit and achievement, commendations, and similar awards.

Tasks:

- To plan, organize, equip and train for conducting special operations in order to destroy and disable enemy forces and facilities;
- To maintain the ability to organize, train, consult and help in peace support operations within or led by international organizations out of North Macedonia;
- To plan, organize, equip and train for operations supporting state institutions in case of natural disasters.

== Rangers Battalion ==
=== History ===
The Rangers Battalion was formed in 2004. It consists of the former Reconnaissance battalion as well as servicemen from other ARM units. The Rangers Battalion has a respectable experience and is a significant ARM representative which is continually preparing for successfully conducting its mission.

Since 2004 the unit went through an intensive developing period and put maximum efforts improving the operative ability and is always ready to manage all challenges of the modern time.

As a result of its readiness and interoperability with NATO units, the deep in enemy territory observation unit as part of the Rangers Battalion in the period from 2007 to 2010 has successfully finished the self-assessment level 1, NATO assessment level 1 – CREVAL and self-assessment level 2 – TACEVAL.

The unit consists of professional staff educated and trained according to NATO programs and standards. The servicemen are young and psychophysically well prepared and motivated professionals who are trained for combat and are able to perform operations under different conditions.

=== Missions abroad ===
Members of the Rangers Battalion took part in a few peacekeeping missions in Iraq from 2004 to 2009 and in Afghanistan in 2010. The participants in the missions have been rewarded with a large number of certificates of appreciation and with medals and other stimulating decorations.

== Gallery ==
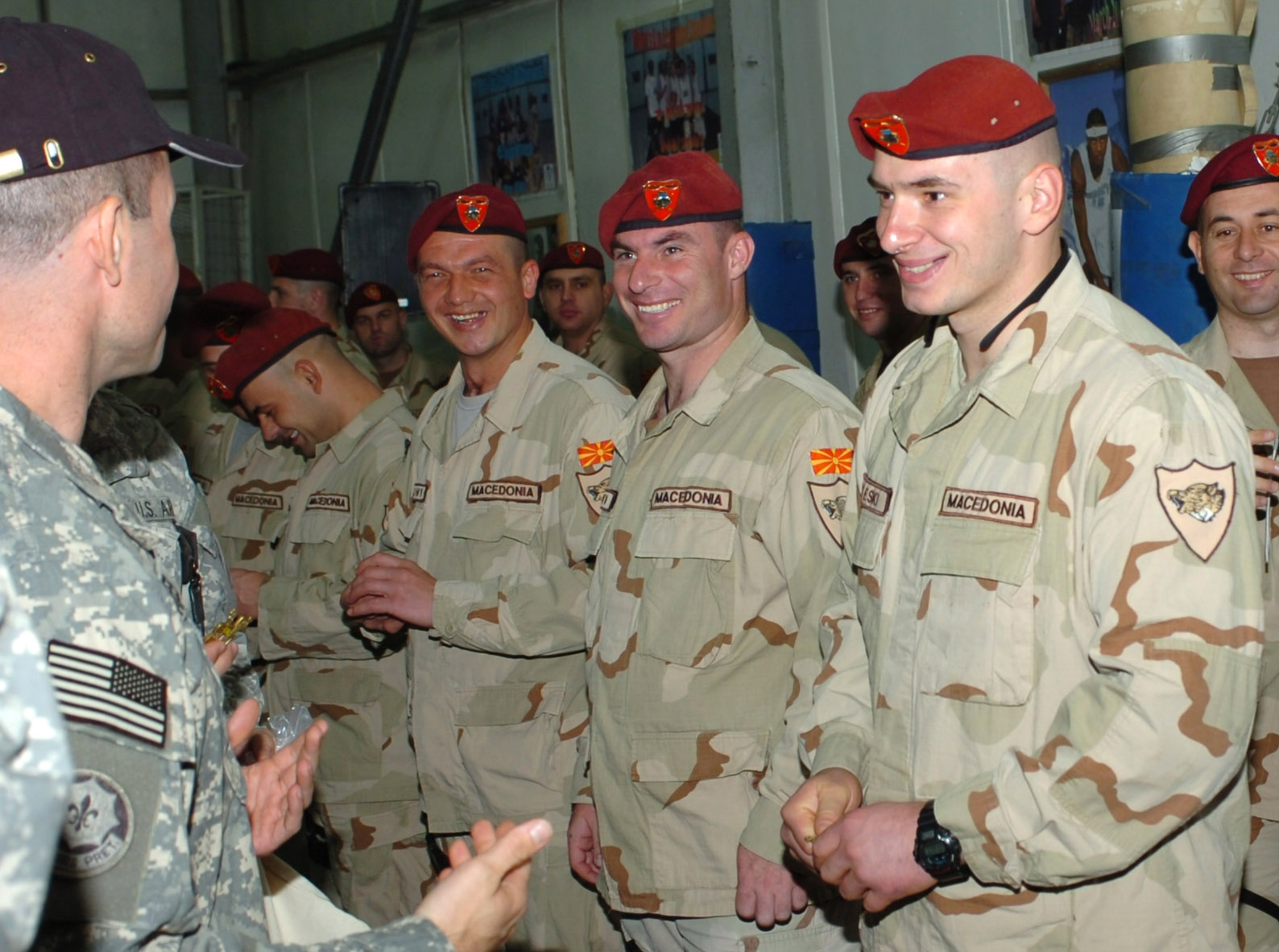
Wolves in Iraqi Freedom Mission

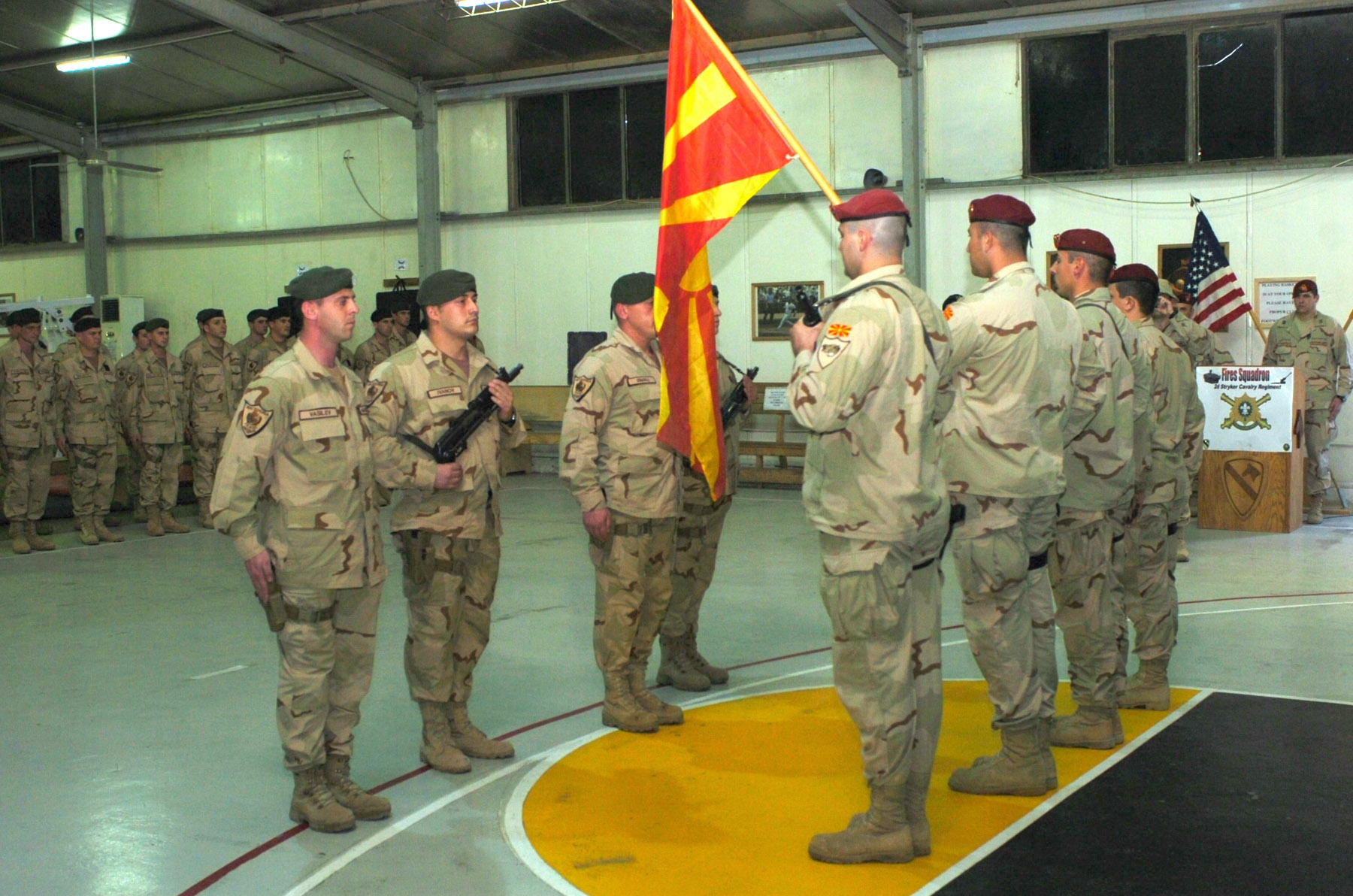
Wolves and Rangers in Iraq

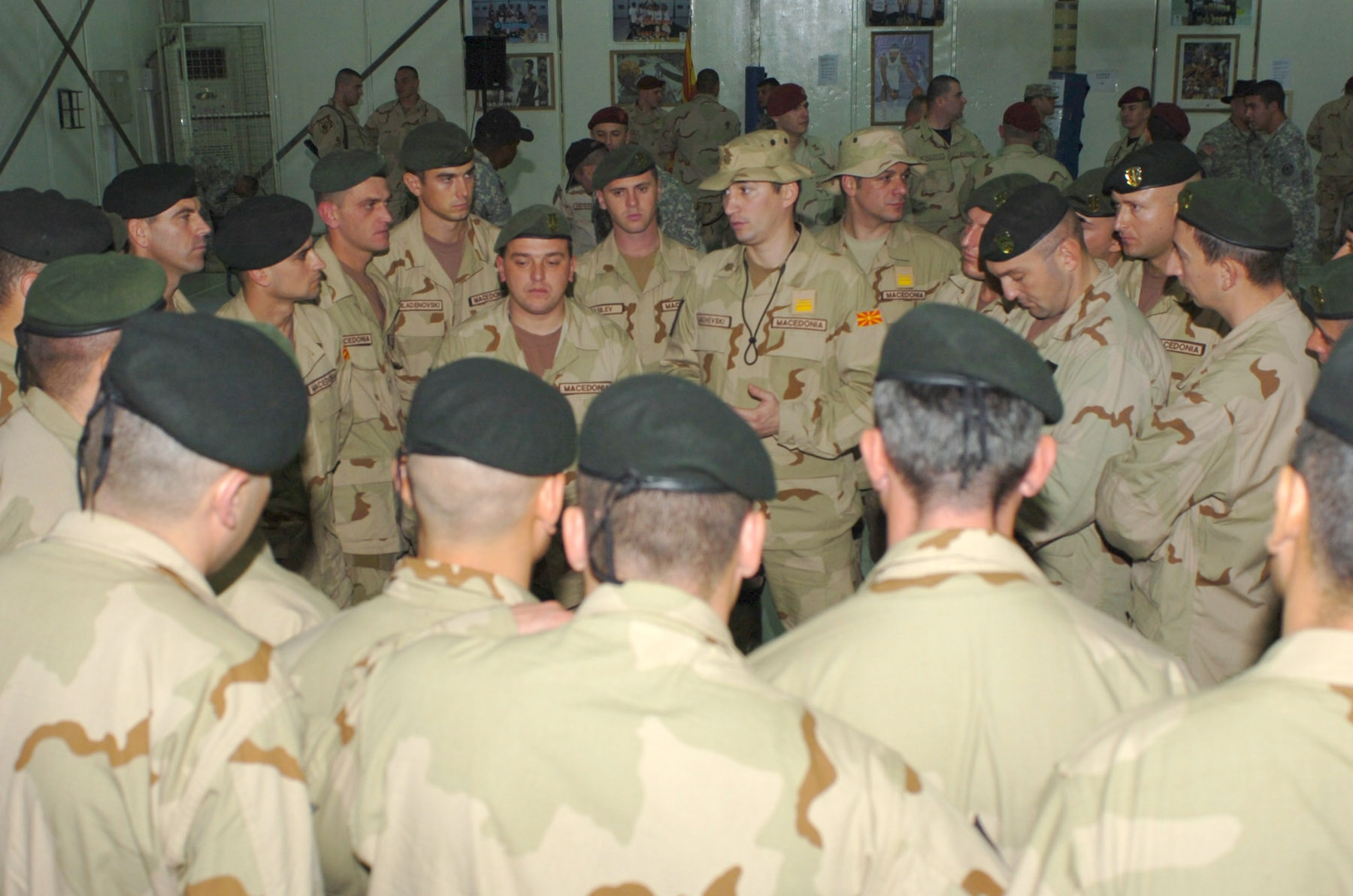
Rangers in Iraqi Freedom Mission

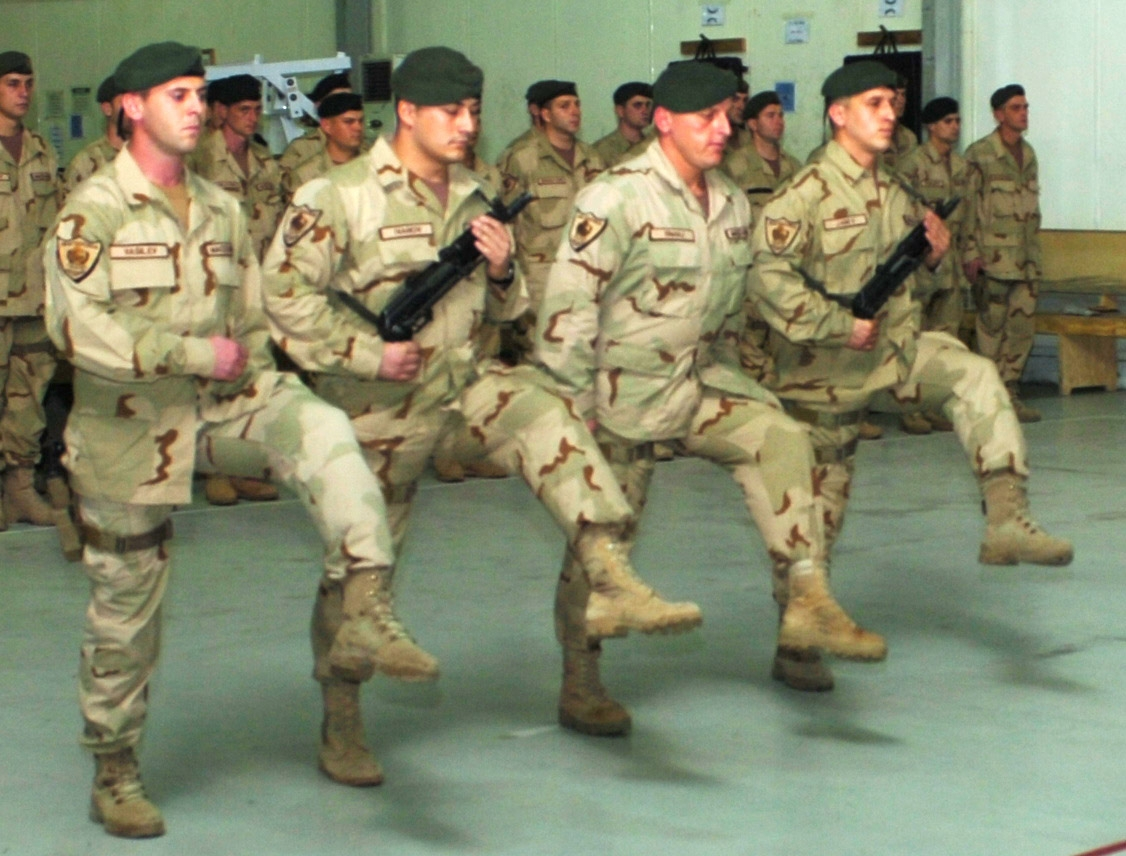
Rangers in Iraqi Freedom Mission

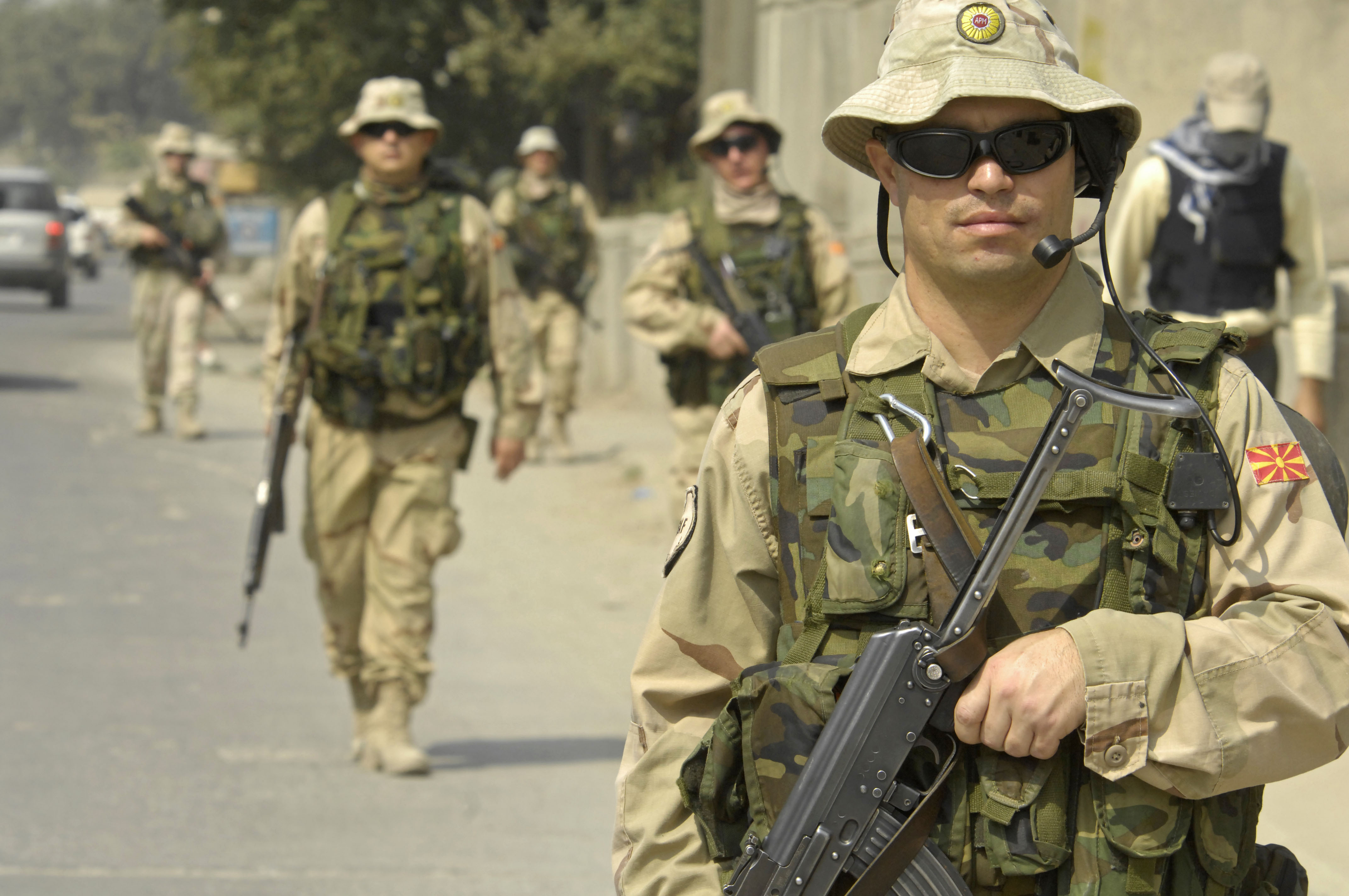
Wolves in Kabul 2008

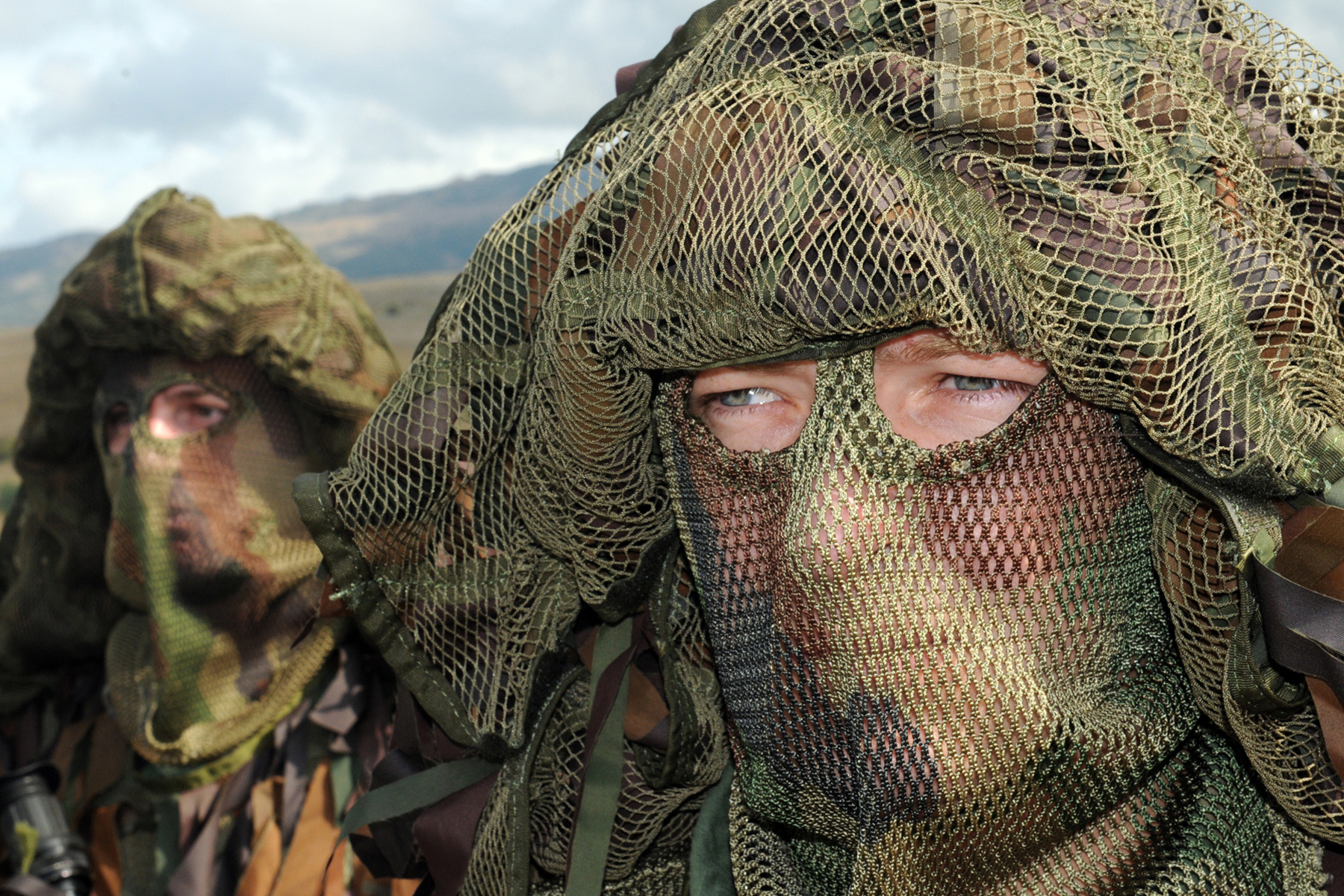
Wolves in training in Croatia 2009

== See also ==
- Army of North Macedonia
- North Macedonia Air Brigade
- Rangers Battalion (North Macedonia)
- 1st Mechanized Infantry Brigade (North Macedonia)
- Ceremonial Guard Battalion
- Military Reserve Force (North Macedonia)
- Military Service for Security and Intelligence
