= Ceremonial Guard Battalion =

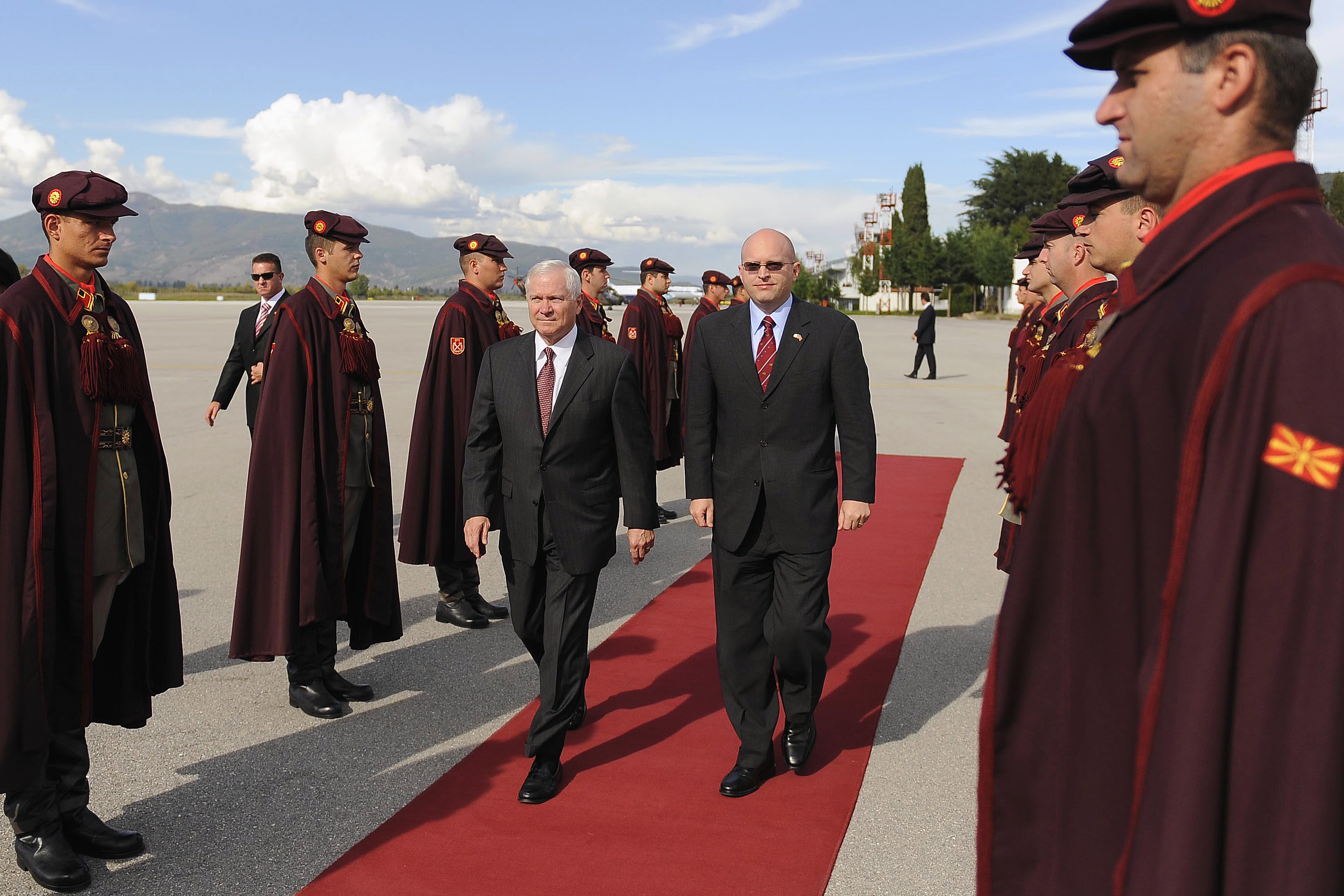
- Ceremonial Guard Battalion of North Macedonia
- Active: 22 July 2002
- Country: Republic of North Macedonia
- Allegiance: President of North Macedonia
- Branch: Army of the Republic of North Macedonia
- Type: Guard of honour
- Role: Military honors; Welcoming and sending off ceremonial duties; Funeral honors; Flag ceremonies; Maintains the tomb of the late President of Macedonia; Maintains the combat readiness of the unit
- Garrison/HQ: Ilinden, Skopje Region
- Nickname: Macedonian Guard (Македонија Гарда)
- Anniversaries: 11 November (Unit Day)

Commanders
- Current commander: Lieutenant Colonel Toni Tonev (since 30 October 2015)
- Notable commanders: Lieutenant Colonel Toni Apostoloski

Insignia
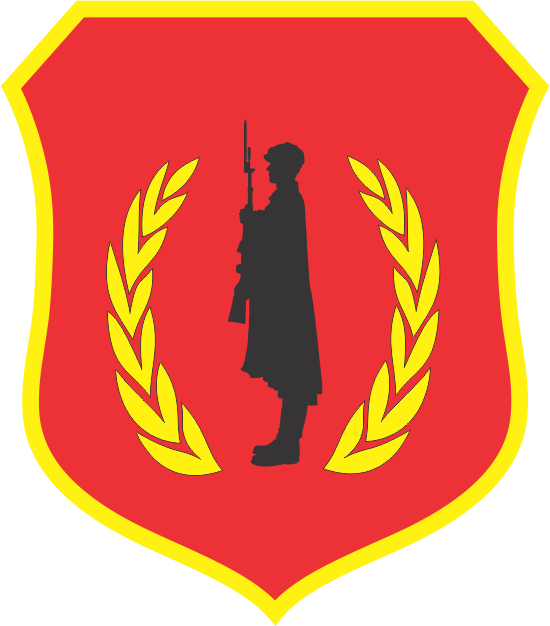
- Shoulder Patch

The Ceremonial Guard Battalion (Macedonian: Церемонијален гардански баталјон, romanized: Ceremonijalen gardanski bataljon), also known as the Honour Battalion (Macedonian: Баталјонот за почести, romanized: Bataljonot za počesti) is a military unit of the Macedonian Military. The mission of the Ceremonial Guard Battalion is to perform military honors for all events regulated by the rules of engagement in ARNM, as well as maintaining the combat readiness of the Ceremonial Guard Battalion units at the highest level.

== History ==
After the departure of Yugoslav People Army's from Macedonia, the Ceremonial Guard Battalion became an official regiment on March 26, 1992, as part of the First Guard Brigade. On July 22, 2002, the Honour and Serving Guards Battalion was designated as the main guard of honour for Macedonia. On March 1, 2006, it was renamed as the Honour and Serving Battalion. It has officially been entitled the Ceremonial Guard Battalion since April 1, 2012.

The battalion provided honours for the state funerals of President Boris Trajkovski and songwriter Toše Proeski.

== Structure ==
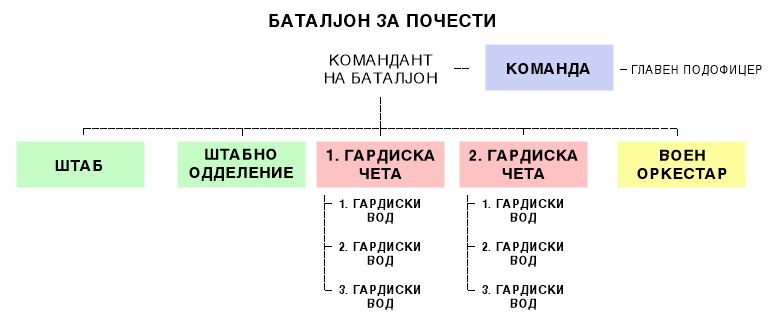
Structure of the battalion.

- Battalion Command
  - Battalion Commander
- Battalion Headquarters
- Administration Company
- Guard Company
  - Guard Platoon
  - Guard Platoon
  - Guard Platoon
  - Guard Platoon
- Guard Company
  - Guard Platoon
  - Guard Platoon
  - Guard Platoon
  - Guard Platoon
- Military Band

=== Military Band ===
The Military Band (Macedonian: Воениот оркестар, romanized: Voeniot orkestar) is a professional and unique unit inside the battalion, engaging in its duties by performing at significant protocol events organized by the army and the federal government. It was founded in 1944 in the city of Bitola, as part of the 7th Macedonian Drill Brigade. After the creation of the Socialist Federal Republic of Yugoslavia (SFRY), the band worked in the ranks of the Third Army Area of the Yugoslav People's Army, based in Skopje. After independence, the band was reformed to represent the ARM in its entirety, acting as a musical ambassador. It has performed in Bosnia and Herzegovina, Serbia and Bulgaria, and used foreign compositions made by famous composers such as Pyotr Ilyich Tchaikovsky, John Philip Sousa, Johann Strauss and John Williams.

== Traditions ==
The members of the honour guard battalion performs the well-known drills such as their trademark "Egzircir" routine.

=== Unit Day ===
11 November, is known as the Day of the Unit. It was chosen in honour of the traditions of the First Macedonian Kosovo Shock Brigade of the National Liberation Army and Partisan Detachments of Macedonia, which was established on this date in 1943 in the village of Slivovo.

=== Activities ===
A contingent from one of the companies took part in the Great Union Day military parade in Romania in 2019. Within the visit, members of the Honor Guard Battalion met with the Ambassador of North Macedonia to Romania, Gabriel Atanasov.

=== Uniform ===
The Macedonian Ministry of Defence designed new uniforms for the battalion in 2010. The new uniform is based on the uniform of the Internal Macedonian Revolutionary Organization (IMRO) and specifically the uniform of revolutionary Ilyo Voyvoda.

== See also ==
- Special Forces Battalion
- The Rangers Battalion
- Macedonian Air Force
- Army of the Republic of Macedonia
- Military Reserve Force (Macedonia)
- Military Service for Security and Intelligence
- Macedonia
