= 2008 Macedonian Armed Forces Mil Mi-17 crash =

2008 Macedonian Armed Forces Mi-17 crash
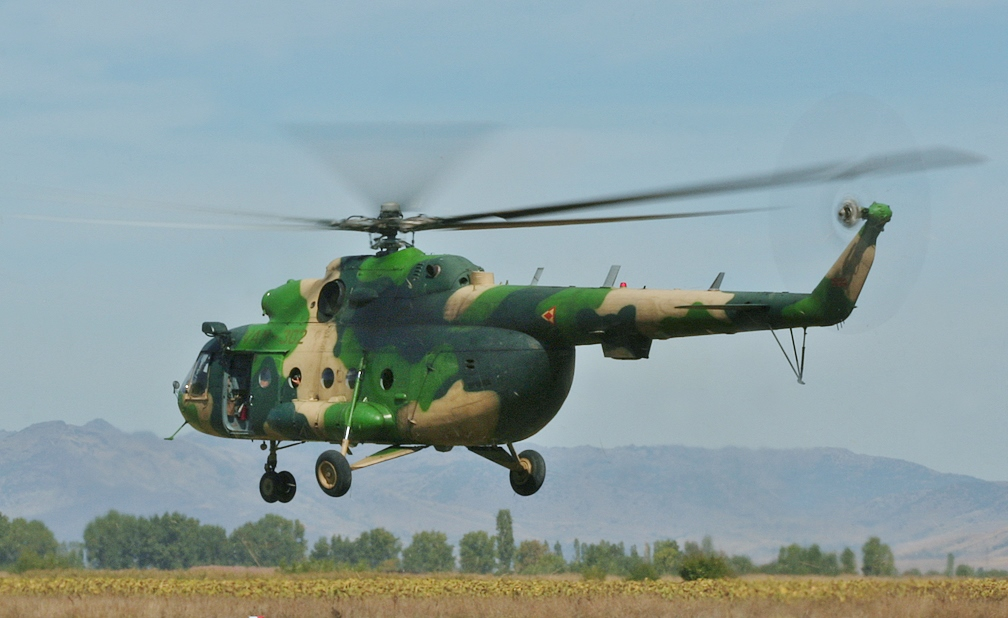
- A Macedonian Air Force Mil Mi-17 identical to the one involved in the incident.

Accident
- Date: 12 January 2008
- Summary: Weather-related crash
- Site: Blace, near Katlanovo, Macedonia

Aircraft
- Aircraft type: Mil Mi-17
- Operator: Army of the Republic of Macedonia
- Registration: VAM-304
- Flight origin: Camp Butmir, Sarajevo, Bosnia and Herzegovina
- Destination: Skopje Airport
- Occupants: 11
- Passengers: 8
- Crew: 3
- Fatalities: 11
- Survivors: 0

On 12 January 2008, a Mil Mi-17 transport helicopter belonging to the Macedonian military, crashed 50–100 metres from the village of Blace, situated in the region of Katlanovo, approximately 10–15 kilometres south-east of Skopje, Macedonia due to low visibility caused by heavy fog. All 11 individuals aboard the helicopter, including 8 passengers and 3 crew members, were killed in the crash.

== Incident ==
The incident took place at approximately 11:00 a.m. (GMT). The helicopter was returning from a EUFOR peacekeeping mission in Bosnia and Herzegovina and started to experience foggy conditions whilst preparing to land at their destination – the Skopje Airport. The crash was reported by two local fishermen who claimed they saw the helicopter flying unusually low. A witness stated that "The engine of the helicopter did not sound like it worked well..." Witnesses also reported seeing a "fireball" as the helicopter became engulfed in flames following impact. This was subsequently followed by a series of explosions, possibly triggered by a supply of kerosene or ammunition.

Based on a Reuters photographer's eye-witness account, the helicopter was incinerated and debris was found up to 100 metres from the crash site.

== Reactions ==
Upon arriving at the scene of the event, the Macedonian prime minister, Nikola Gruevski, said; "This is a terrible accident, a great tragedy and a great loss. I express my deepest and sincerest condolences to the families of the victims. An investigation is starting that will identify the cause of the accident."

The Macedonian president, Branko Crvenkovski, also expressed his sympathy for the lives lost, stating: "We have not seen such a tragic loss [sic] of Macedonian soldiers in the country's recent history..." The Ministry of Defense of the Republic of Macedonia confirmed that the incident is the deadliest aviation accident to occur within the country's air force.

Along with the president and prime minister, the Interior Minister of the Republic of Macedonia, Gordana Jankulovska, also visited the crash site immediately following the incident.

== Aftermath ==
In the immediate aftermath of the crash, only seven soldiers were fully identified. After the identification of all victims involved in the crash, it was reported that a total of eleven military personnel between the ages of 26 and 40 had been killed in the crash.

Following the incident, the Macedonian government created a special body to lead the investigation into the cause of the crash.
