= Rangers Battalion (North Macedonia) =

Special operations force in North Macedonia

The Rangers Battalion
- Active: 2004
- Country: North Macedonia
- Allegiance: Army of North Macedonia
- Branch: Special Operations Regiment
- Type: Special operations forces
- Size: Battalion
- Nickname: Rangers (Macedonian: Ренџери)
- Engagements: (Islamic Republic of Afghanistan) Afghanistan

Commanders
- Current commander: Lieutenant Colonel Besnik Emini

The Rangers Battalion is a main one of two unit of the Special Operations Regiment of the Army of North Macedonia. It consists of the former Reconnaissance battalion and the Parachuting squad as well as servicemen from other units.

The Rangers Battalion is designed to quick deploy and execute response military special operations missions throughout the Army of North Macedonia areas of operations.

Generally, the main mission of this unit is to conduct air assault and airborne operations in the event of an emergency requiring military force as a rapid deployment force (RDF), clandestine operations, counterinsurgency, direct action on key targets, irregular warfare, long-range penetration, operating in difficult to access terrains and dangerous areas, special reconnaissance, support hostage rescue, and tactical international counterterrorism operations.

== Awards ==
In 2011 the President and the Supreme Commander of the armed forces awarded the Rangers Battalion the medal of military merits for a successful accomplishment of their tasks and challenges.

== See also ==
- Special Operations Regiment (North Macedonia)
- Ceremonial Guard Battalion
- Military Reserve Force (Macedonia)
- North Macedonia Air Brigade
- Army of the Republic of North Macedonia
- Military Service for Security and Intelligence
- North Macedonia

== Gallery ==
The Rangers Battalion is part of Special Operations Regiment
