= Army of North Macedonia =

Combined military forces of North Macedonia

Army of the Republic of North Macedonia
- Macedonian: Армија на Република Северна Македонија
- Emblem of the Army
- Founded: 21 February 1992
- Current form: 27 March 1992
- Service branches: 1st MIB; Air Brigade; Special Operations Regiment
- Headquarters: Skopje, North Macedonia
- Website: Official website

Leadership
- Commander-in-Chief: President Gordana Siljanovska-Davkova
- Minister of Defense: Vlado Misajlovski
- Chief of the General Staff: Lieutenant General Saško Lafčiski

Personnel
- Military age: 18 years of age
- Conscription: Repealed
- Active personnel: 10,011 active personnel
- Reserve personnel: 60,000 reserve personnel

Expenditure
- Budget: €358 million (2025)
- Percent of GDP: 2% (2025)

Industry
- Domestic suppliers: Eurokompozit Prilep; ATS Ballistics
- Foreign suppliers: Bulgaria; Germany; Greece; Serbia; European Union; NATO; South Africa; South Korea; Turkey; Ukraine; United States; United Kingdom Formerly: Russia

Related articles
- History: Military history of North Macedonia
- Ranks: Military ranks of North Macedonia

The Army of the Republic of North Macedonia (Macedonian: Армија на Република Северна Македонија, APCM, romanized: Armija na Republika Severna Makedonija, ARSM) is the military of North Macedonia. The army is organized, prepared and trained to conduct armed struggle and combat and other actions to achieve its constitutional function of defending the independence and territorial integrity of North Macedonia. The army consists of the ground forces and the air force, which are further divided into branches and services. The army has a permanent composition and reserve forces. Since 2005, it is a fully professional defense force compatible with NATO standards. On 27 March 2020, North Macedonia joined NATO as the 30th member.

== History ==
The Republic of Macedonia became a sovereign and independent state in 1991, following the 8 September referendum. On 17 November, the Constitution of the Republic of Macedonia was promulgated, which established that the armed forces of the Republic are responsible for protecting its territorial integrity and independence. On 15 February 1992, the Defense Law entered into force. Until this law was adopted, the armed forces consisted of the units, commands and headquarters of the Territorial Defense of the Republic of Macedonia. These forces had a wartime strength of roughly 100,000 manpower, according to a March 1991 CIA estimate, and were inherited from the Yugoslav People's Army.

Macedonia remained at peace while other republics of Yugoslavia were at war. When the Defense Law entered into force, the JNA was still present in Macedonia. A week later, on 21 February 1992, an agreement was reached for the dislocation of the JNA, signed by President Kiro Gligorov and Blagoje Adžić, Acting Federal Secretary of People's Defense of Yugoslavia. The JNA took all of its equipment with it, stripping the facilities bare, and mining them. In some cases, even army apartments were stripped of wire and plumbing. The Belgrade newspaper Vreme estimated at the time that the JNA had removed equipment worth between $14 billion and $20 billion. It wrote that the weapons taken from Macedonia could have armed up to 30,000 troops. Macedonian officials argued that the republic had been contributing to the federal army budget since 1945, therefore most of the equipment belonged to Macedonia. The JNA withdrawal formally ended on 27 March 1992, when President Gligorov and JNA General Nikola Uzelac signed an agreement, after the previous day, the last and largest military facility, the Marshal Tito barracks in Skopje, today named Ilinden, was taken over. The first recruit of the Army of the Republic of Macedonia reported to the barracks in Ohrid on 13 April 1992, two days before the appointed date.

In 1995, the government passed the military academy law and became the 27th member of the NATO "Partnership and peace" initiative.

In 1996, for the first time a Macedonian army unit participated in a multinational exercise called "Peace Eagle 96" in Albania.

In 1999, the first class of 64 sergeants were presented in the Goce Delčev barracks to had started and finished their schooling in the new military academy of Macedonia "Mihailo Apostolski".

In 2001, Macedonia struggled with an ethnic insurgency. The insurgency was a short-lived civil conflict between ethnic Albanian militants of the NLA and special police and military forces of the Republic of Macedonia. The conflict, which ended with the disarmament of the Albanian militia.

In 2006, the Macedonian army became a fully professional force and the Second Mechanized Infantry Brigade was formed.

=== Participation in international operations ===
==== War in Afghanistan ====
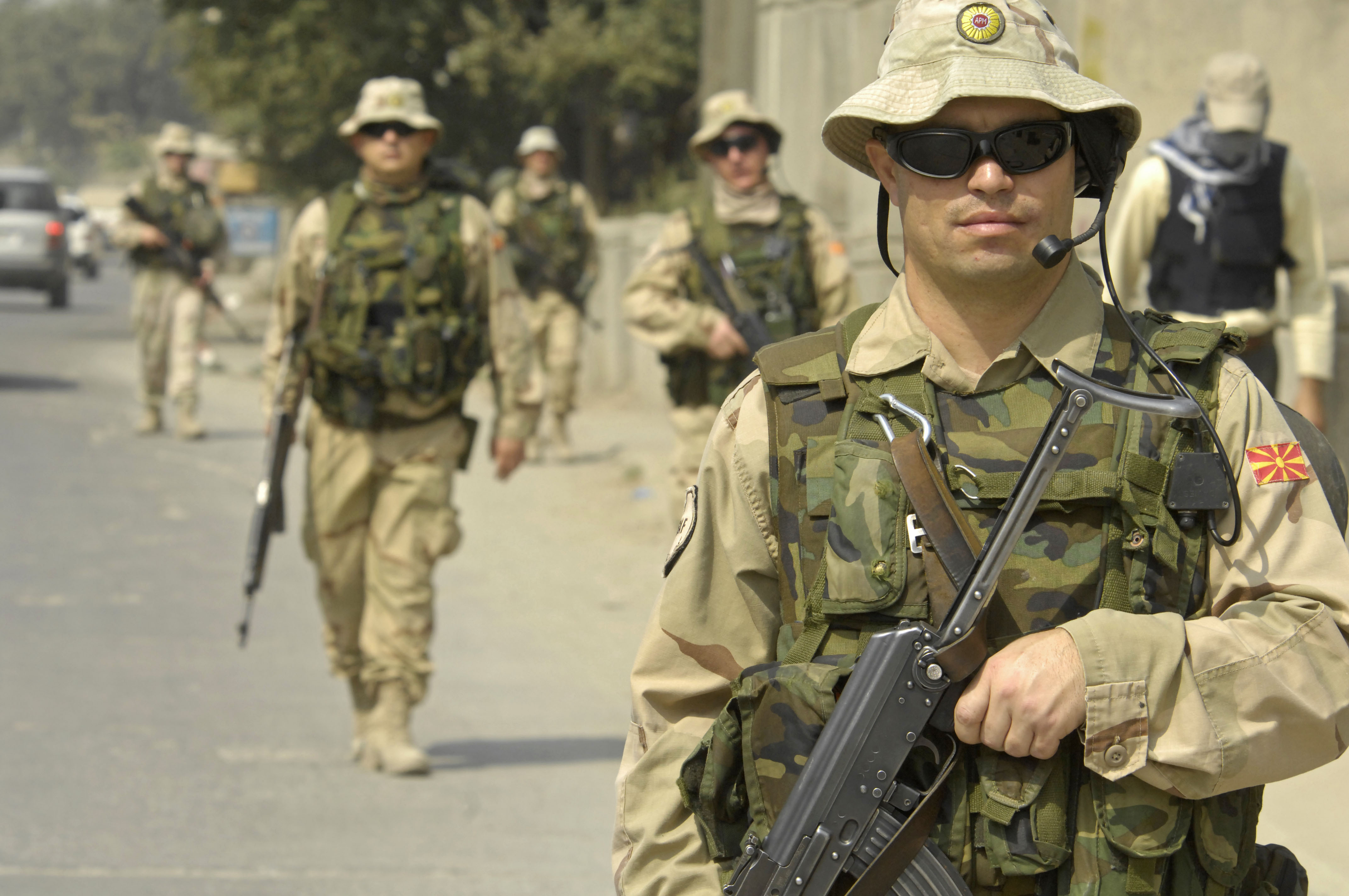
Macedonian soldiers in Kabul

The then-Republic of Macedonia began its participation in the NATO-led ISAF operation in August 2002, with the allocation of two officers to the Turkish contingent. On 8 September, independence day of the Republic of Macedonia, the Macedonian flag was flown for the first time in Kabul. In March 2003, the Army of the Republic of Macedonia increased its contribution in the ISAF mission by sending one section from the 2nd Infantry Brigade as part of the German contingent. As a result of the successful execution of the mission and the high marks received for participation in ISAF, from August 2004 until the end of 2006, it participated with one mechanized infantry platoon from the Leopard unit. At the same time, in August 2005 medical personnel was sent in ISAF as part of the Combined Medical Team in the A3 format (Macedonia, Albania, Croatia), which successfully carried out tasks at the Kabul airport, firstly in the composition of the Greek Field Hospital, and later in the composition of the Czech Field Hospital.

Based on the assessments of the Alliance in the part of the declared units from the Army of the Republic of Macedonia, which achieved the required strict standards in the field of training and operational procedures, and in line with the Operational Capabilities Concept (OCC), the Army in June 2006 sent also one mechanized infantry company, part of the first mechanized infantry brigade, in the composition of the British contingent in ISAF. The trust shown from the United Kingdom towards the ninety "Scorpions" from the first infantry brigade, was justified in full.

The high marks from the highest command structures for the work of the unit as well as the learned lessons are only an imperative for continuing the successful mission. In the second rotation of the company for securing the ISAF command, the Republic of Macedonia increased the participation from ninety to one hundred and twenty seven participants, and from January 2008 it sent three staff officers in the ISAF Command in Kabul.

As a support to the efforts for self-sustainability of the Afghanistan National Army (ANA), beginning from March 2008, the Republic of Macedonia sent two soldiers (one officer and one NCO) as part of the Combined Multinational Operational Mentoring and Liaison Team (OMLT) in Mazar-i-Sharif while, beginning from December 2008, in cooperation with the Kingdom of Norway, a Macedonian medical team is included through one Surgical team in the organizational structure of the surgical unit of the Norwegian Provincial Reconstruction Team (PRT) in Meymanah, Afghanistan.

==== EUFOR Althea ====
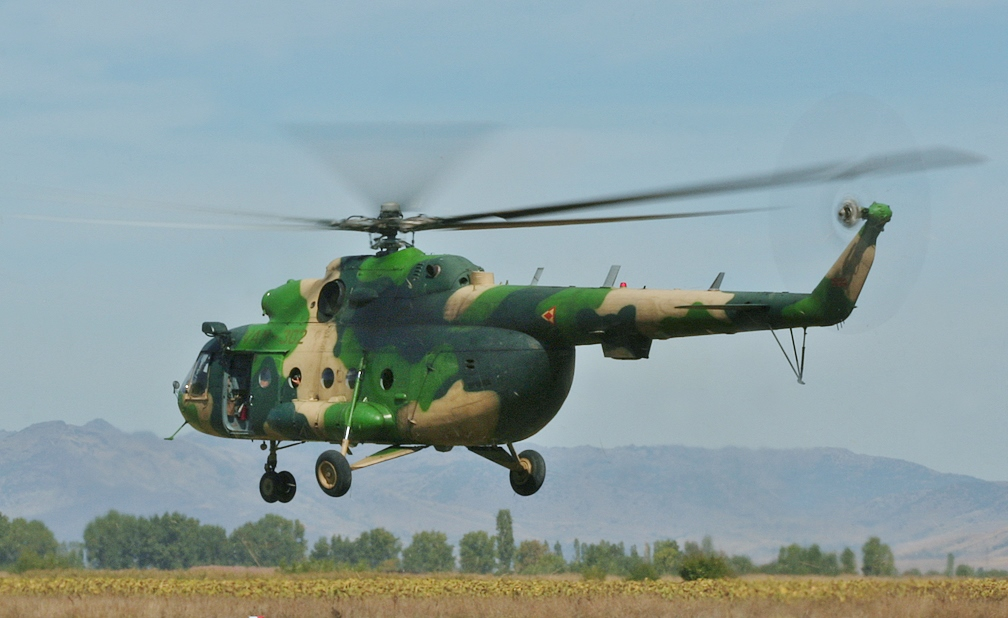
Macedonian Mi-8 in EUFOR Althea Mission in BiH

North Macedonia has reaffirmed its strategic commitment for attaining membership to the EU by its resolute political commitment to support the Common Foreign and Security Policy (CSFP) and by declaring a concrete contribution to the civilian and military operations in the framework of the Common Security and Defence Policy (CSDP). The participation of the then-Republic of Macedonia in the EU crisis management military operation Althea in Bosnia and Herzegovina marked the first in the series of concrete and substantial contributions that the country provided in the framework of the civilian and military CSDP operations aimed at enhancing the EU capacities. The Agreement with the EU for its participation in Althea was signed on 3 July 2006, in Brussels. The contribution of the Republic of Macedonia to the EU operation Althea has confirmed its progress from a consumer of the first EU military operation (Concordia 2003) into an active contributor to the CSDP (Althea 2006). The country's first contribution to an EU-led operation began in July 2006, by declaring a helicopter detachment, consisting of two Mi-8/17 helicopters and 21crew. In November 2006, the Republic of Macedonia enhanced its own contribution to the EU operation Althea in Bosnia and Herzegovina by declaring a medical team composed of 10 personnel for providing Role 1 medical support in Camp Butmir.

==== Iraq War ====
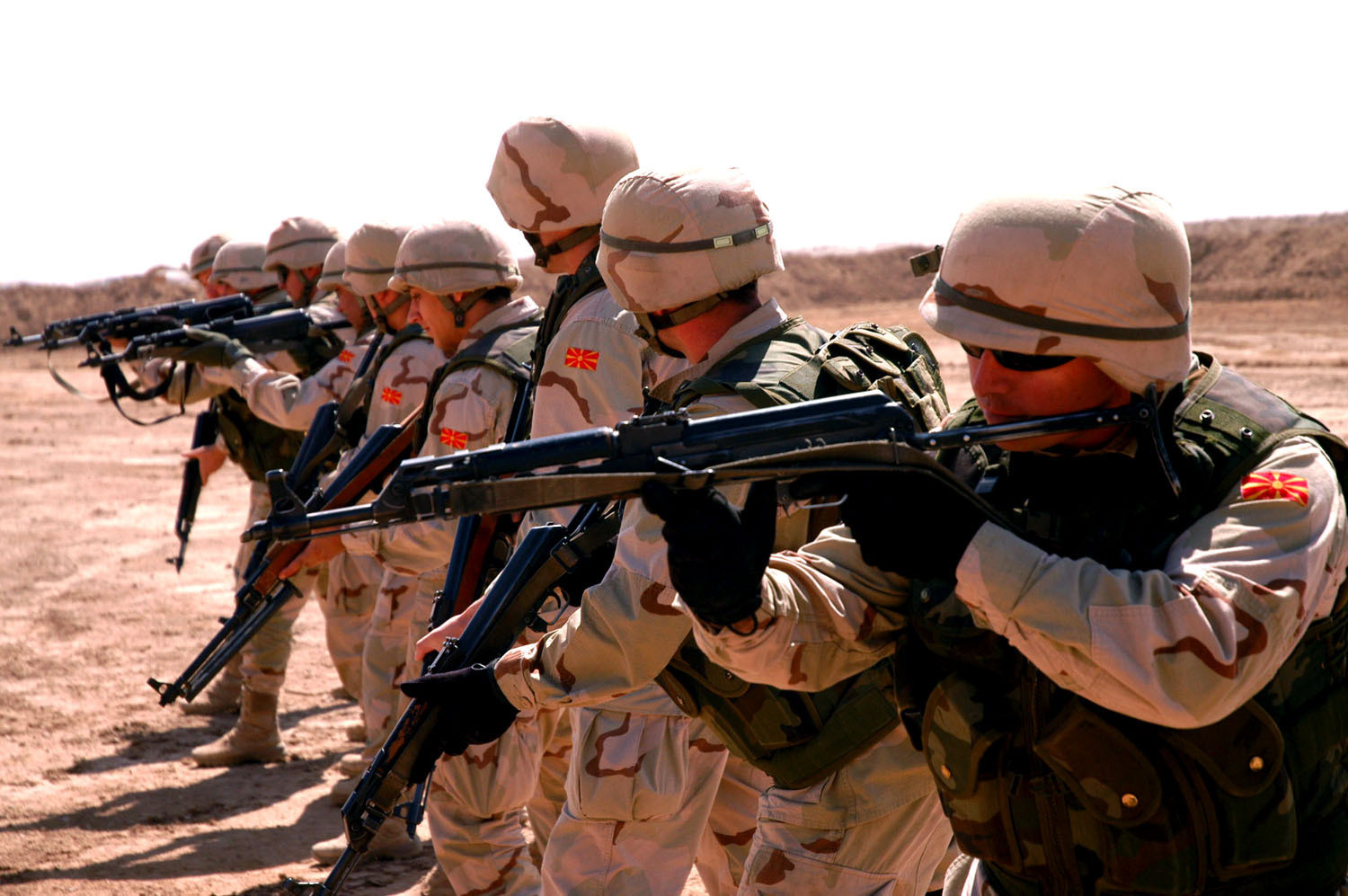
Macedonian soldiers in 2008 during the Iraq War

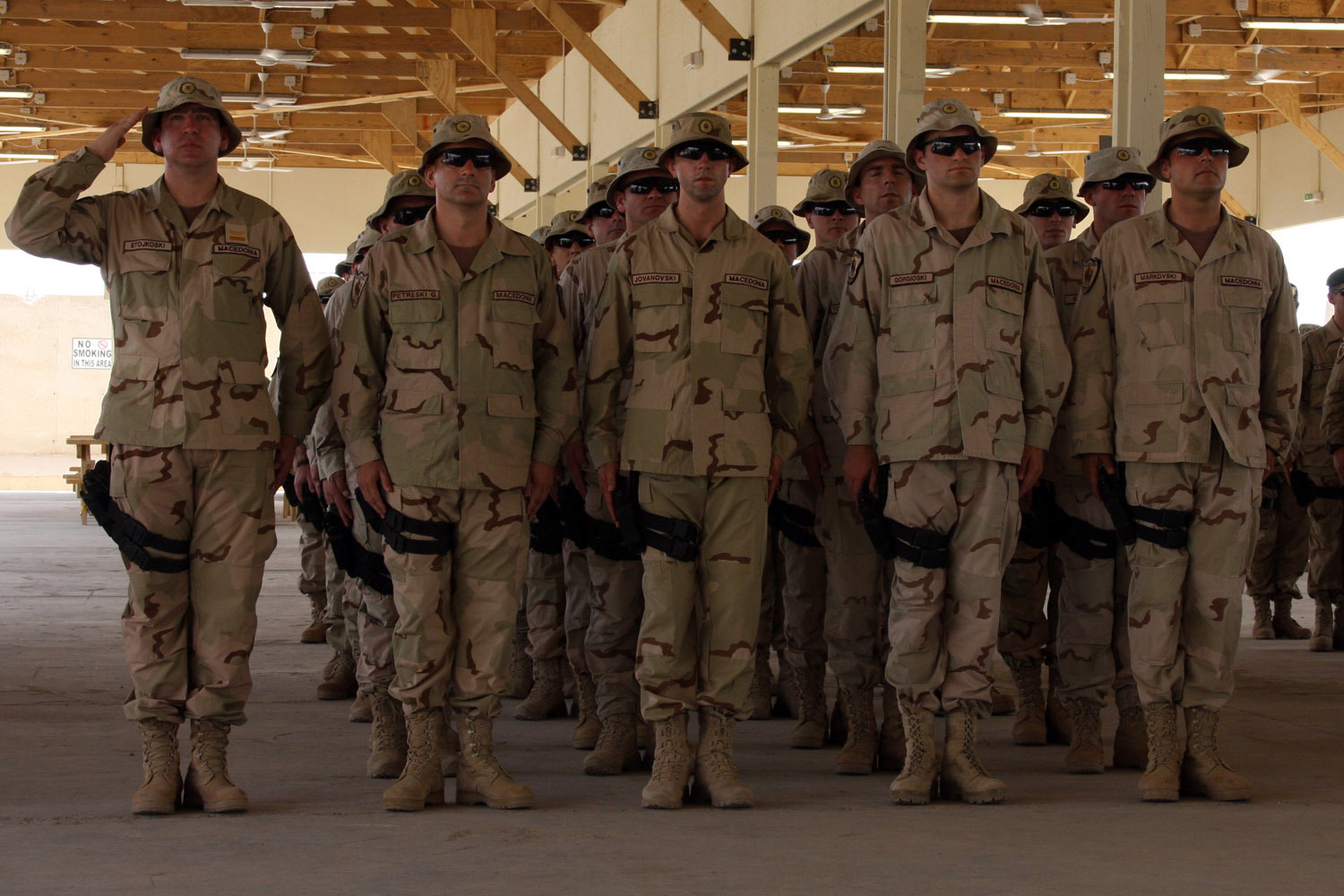
A Macedonian soldier saluting on behalf of his men during a performance of the Macedonian national anthem in 2008

With the political consensus of all political entities in the RM as well as the overall Macedonian public in terms of the support of the Coalition in the "fight against terrorism", the Republic of Macedonia took active participation by sending its units in the Iraqi Freedom Mission. Based on all legal authorizations, the Assembly of the Republic of Macedonia adopted decisions for sending its units to the Iraqi Freedom Mission in the period between June 2003 and December 2008 for each mission separately every 6 months during the term of the mission. The Mission started by sending two officers in the US Central Command in Tampa, in March 2003. Upon the completion of the major combat operations, the toppling of Saddam Hussein's regime, and the adoption of Resolution 1546 of the United Nations Security Council, in June 2003 on sending a special task platoon that executed the tasks as part of the 4th infantry division of the Multi-National Force Iraq. In 2008, participation in the Iraqi Freedom Mission was increased by an additional platoon. A total of 11 rotations were conducted between June 2003 and December 2008. The eleventh rotation was the last, which completed participation in the Iraqi Mission. The overall number of personnel that participated in this mission is 490.

==== Support for KFOR ====
Having in mind the priorities in the part of logistics not only in national terms, but even more in proportion with the requirements and requests of the Alliance, the Host Nation Support Coordination Centre began to work in April 2005 as part of the NATO HQ in Skopje, a project implemented for the first time with a member nation from the Partnership for Peace. The project at the beginning was implemented on proposal of General Blease, who at that time was the Commander of NATO forces in Skopje. At the beginning, the project included 11 officers from the Army, who successfully completed the training for the obligations related to giving support from the host nation. Promoting the personal professionalism and achievements, in 2006 these officers became the basis of the Coordination Centre, which gradually began the preparations for undertaking the tasks for support to KFOR.

In June 2007, having in mind the large meaning and the projected goals, the Coordination Centre was included in the formation of the Logistics Support Command in the General Staff of the Army. In this manner as an addition to the participation in the mission in Iraq, Afghanistan, Bosnia and Herzegovina and Lebanon, the Army participates also in the mission for support to Kosovo.

==== UNIFIL ====
Macedonia participated in the peacekeeping mission of the United Nations in Lebanon, UNIFIL.

The security and prosperity in global terms depend more and more on the effective multilateral system. The strategic partnership with the Organization of the United Nations, whose Treaty represents the fundamental framework of the international relations, are the priority of the European Union and NATO on the international security scene. Hence, the contribution of the Republic of Macedonia in the military part with respect to the missions led by the Organization of the United National is a confirmation of the effective membership of the Republic of Macedonia in the Organization and its strategic determinations.

=== 2020– ===
Over the next thirteen months, all of NATO's 29 member states ratified the protocol. The accession protocol entered into force on 19 March 2020, allowing North Macedonia to deposit its instrument of accession and thereby become NATO's 30th member state on 27 March 2020. On 27 March 2020, North Macedonia became the 30th member of NATO.

In November 2023, NATO Secretary General Jens Stoltenberg visited Skopje and commended North Macedonia's contributions to KFOR in Kosovo and its commitment to reaching 2% of GDP in defence spending. In September 2024, North Macedonia's Minister of Defence Vlado Misajlovski met with US defence officials at the Pentagon to discuss increased joint exercises, military-to-military engagements and support to Ukraine.

== Emblem ==
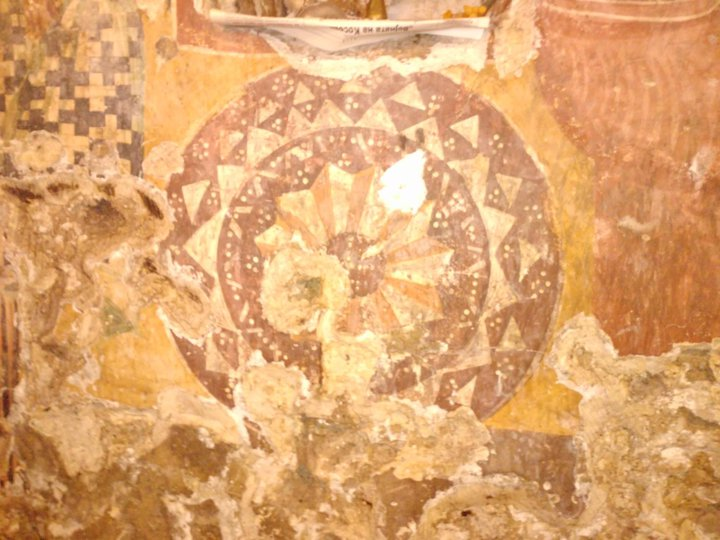
The shield depicted on the church used as a base for the logo of the Army

The emblem of the Army is a stylized depiction of a shield found in the St. George Church in Lazarovci.

== Defence structure ==
=== Basis of the National Defence Policy and Doctrine ===
The national defence policy and doctrine are determined and based upon the following basic security policy goals of North Macedonia:

- To protect the lives and the personal safety of the civilians;
- To guarantee the independence and the territorial integrity of the state;
- To guarantee the material well-being and the prosperity of the civilians.

Its security policy aims to accomplish the following goals:

- Political and economic integration in the EU;
- Political, that is military integration in the Collective Security and Defence Systems – UN, NATO, OSCE, WEU;
- Maintaining of good equal neighbourly relations with all of our neighbours;
- Organising of our own defence system.

Starting out from the security policy provisions and goals, the defence policy of North Macedonia is based upon the following principles:

- Organising of the defence as a system which enables fulfillment of the rights and the commitments of each citizen to defend the country which is guaranteed by the Constitution;
- Organising the defence in order to fulfill the right to an individual and collective self-defence by an armed combat in case of an armed attack, guaranteed by Article 51 of the UN Charter;
- Assuring the defensive character of the defence system;
- Organisation of the Armed Forces as a deterring factor for aggression and other threats to the security of the country and capable of armed resistance in case of an aggression;
- Organising of the defence for full protection of the air sovereignty;
- Uniformity in the use of the Armed Forces.

The political defence strategy of North Macedonia is based upon:

- Deterring aggression;
- Defending the country in case of an aggression;
- Uniformity and conformity in the international co-operation in the area of defence.

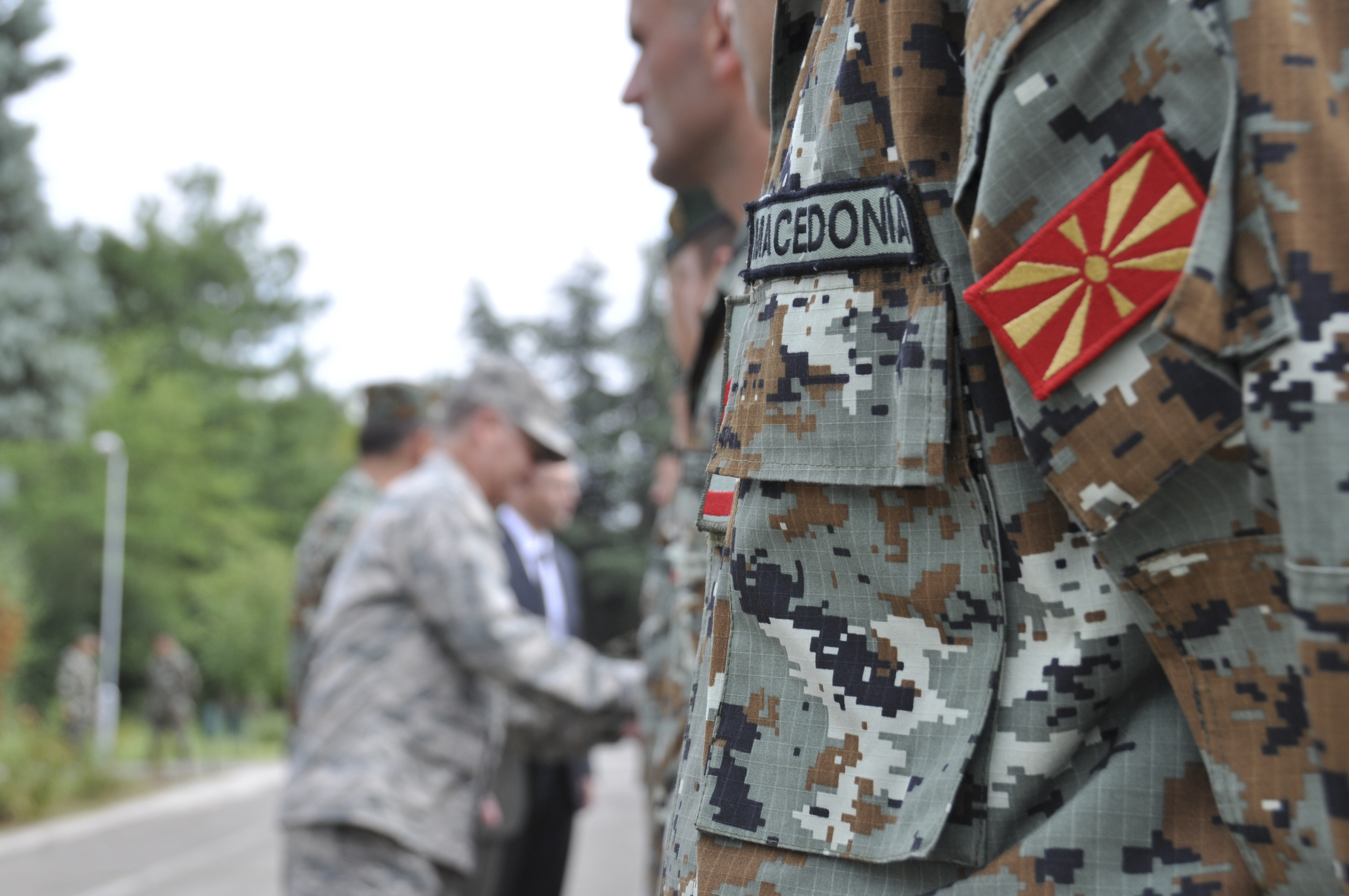
Macedonian soldiers in 2013 wearing the pixel camouflage uniform introduced in 2010

North Macedonia maintains a defensive potential and combat readiness of its Armed Forces which function as a deterring factor in case of a potential aggression in accordance with its capabilities and international arrangements.

In accordance with the Article 123 of the Constitution of North Macedonia, no one in the state has the right to declare capitulation. Therefore, the defence system of North Macedonia is based on the determination to give resistance by use of an armed force against any possible aggression and for a defensive combat on the whole territory. For that purpose, the defence system is responsible to provide conditions so that all of the state authorities and institutions function and conditions for joining the collective defence and security systems as a protection of the independence and sovereignty are provided.

North Macedonia could maintain all the guarantees for its security through the collective defence and security systems. That is why North Macedonia supports the reinforcement of these collective systems and determines itself to actively participate in these systems and to cooperate with regard to the construction of the new European security architecture based upon NATO, OSCE and WEU.

To fulfill these principles and strategic goals, the defence system of North Macedonia is complete with the peacetime and warfare organisation, the basic development goals, the preparations and the use of the Armed Forces as well as the full civilian control over the Armed Forces. The defence system comprises the whole defence potential of the country: civilians, state authorities, civil protection forces, local self-management, public institutions and services and enterprises of special significance for the defence.

The preparations for a successful defence are conducted during peacetime. These include preparations of the state authorities; preparations and training of the Armed Forces and their deployment on the territory of North Macedonia; preparation of the public institutions and the local self-management; preparations of the civil population and participation in joint exercises and other forms of co-operation with the PfP and NATO member countries.

National Command Management

The management and the procedures in the field of defence of North Macedonia are defined by the Constitution, the Defence Law and by the responsibilities of the executive and judicial authorities.

The commanding with the Armed Forces is based upon the uniformity in command when using the forces and the resources, and the responsibility to execute the decisions and the orders of the one that is superior in command.

- The President of the Republic is the Commander-in-Chief of the Armed Forces.

The President passes the defence plan and strategy, the decisions for readiness conducting, organisation and formation structure of the Army, passes documents on development, decision on mobilization etc.

The President at the same time is the Chairman of the Security Council of North Macedonia. The Security Council considers all the defence and security related issues of North Macedonia and makes recommendations to the Parliament and to the Government.

The Parliament of North Macedonia supervises the competence of the Government with regard to the defence, it passes decisions on the existing of a direct threat from a war, declares warfare situation and peace and passes the defence budget.

The Parliamentary Interior Policy and Defence Commission has similar responsibilities.

The Government of North Macedonia has the following responsibilities: proposes the defence plan, the defence budget etc.

The Ministry of Defence develops the defence strategy and works out the assessment of the possible threats and risks. The MOD is also responsible for the defence system, training, readiness of the Armed Forces, the equipment and the development and it proposes the defence budget, etc.

== Organization ==
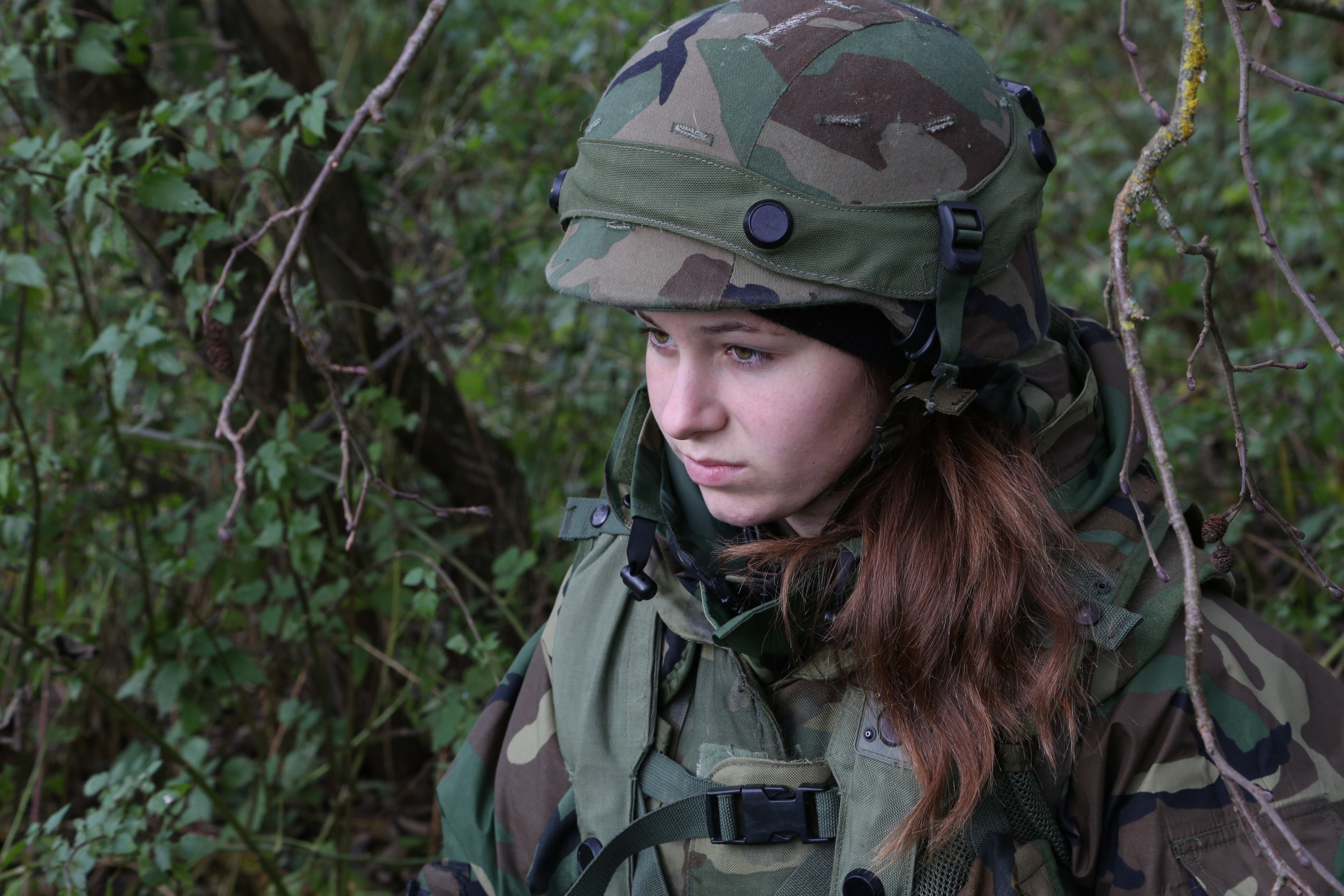
Pvt. Christina Colbasiuc of the Light Infantry Battalion (2014)

The primary arm of the military in North Macedonia is the Army of the Republic of North Macedonia; it is commanded by the Minister of Defense through the Chief of the General Staff (CGS). Two Deputy CGS positions include the Deputy CGS for planning, operations and readiness, under whom operates the General Staff of the Army of the Republic of North Macedonia, and the Deputy CGS for civil-military cooperation.

=== Joint Operations Command ===
Controls and co-ordinates the Mechanized Infantry, Aviation and Logistics Support Brigades

=== Mechanized Infantry Brigade of North Macedonia ===
It plays the key role in securing the safety and unity of the territory of the country. The army is divided into the rapid reaction force and strategic reserve forces. The rapid reaction forces represent the main active combat capability of the military and consist of the 1st Mechanized Infantry Brigade. The strategic reserve forces provide reserve brigades that can be called up in times of emergency.

=== Aviation Brigade of North Macedonia ===
Air Warfare and Air Defence of North Macedonia has an important role as air support element of ground forces and in enhancing flight safety. One of the main goals of the Aviation Brigade is to build up an air surveillance system, which will be the cornerstone of the air traffic safety and airspace control. The air component is made up by the Aviation and the Air Defense Forces. It is located in Skopje International Airport (near Skopje)

- Air Brigade Headquarters
  - Command Company
  - Air Surveillance and Reporting Battalion
  - Helicopter Squadron (Mi-17)
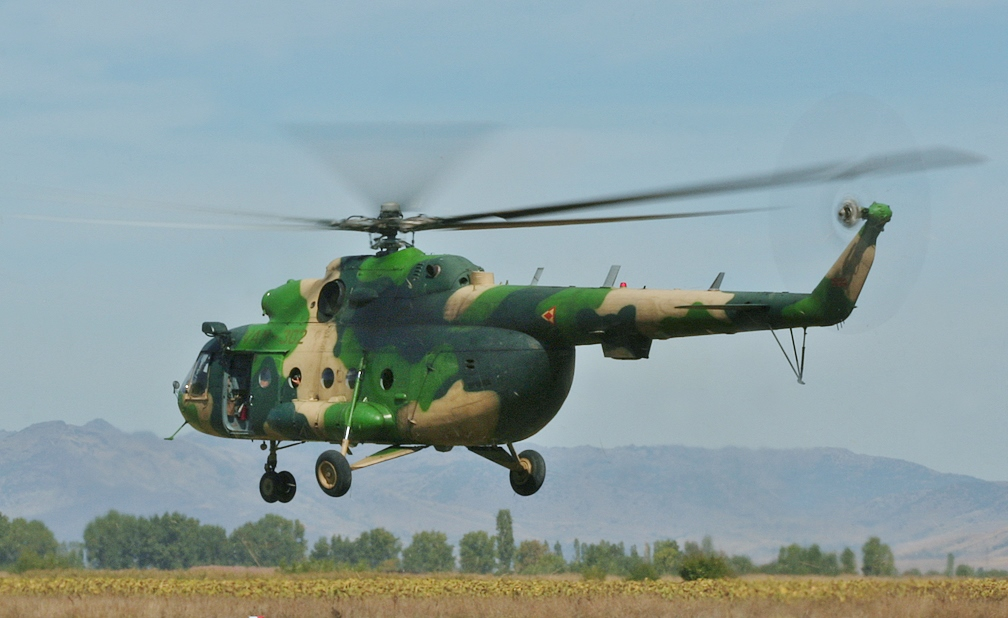

  - Air Defence Battery (9K35 Strela-10)
  - Training Flight (Zlin 242L, Zlin 143L, Bell 206B-3)
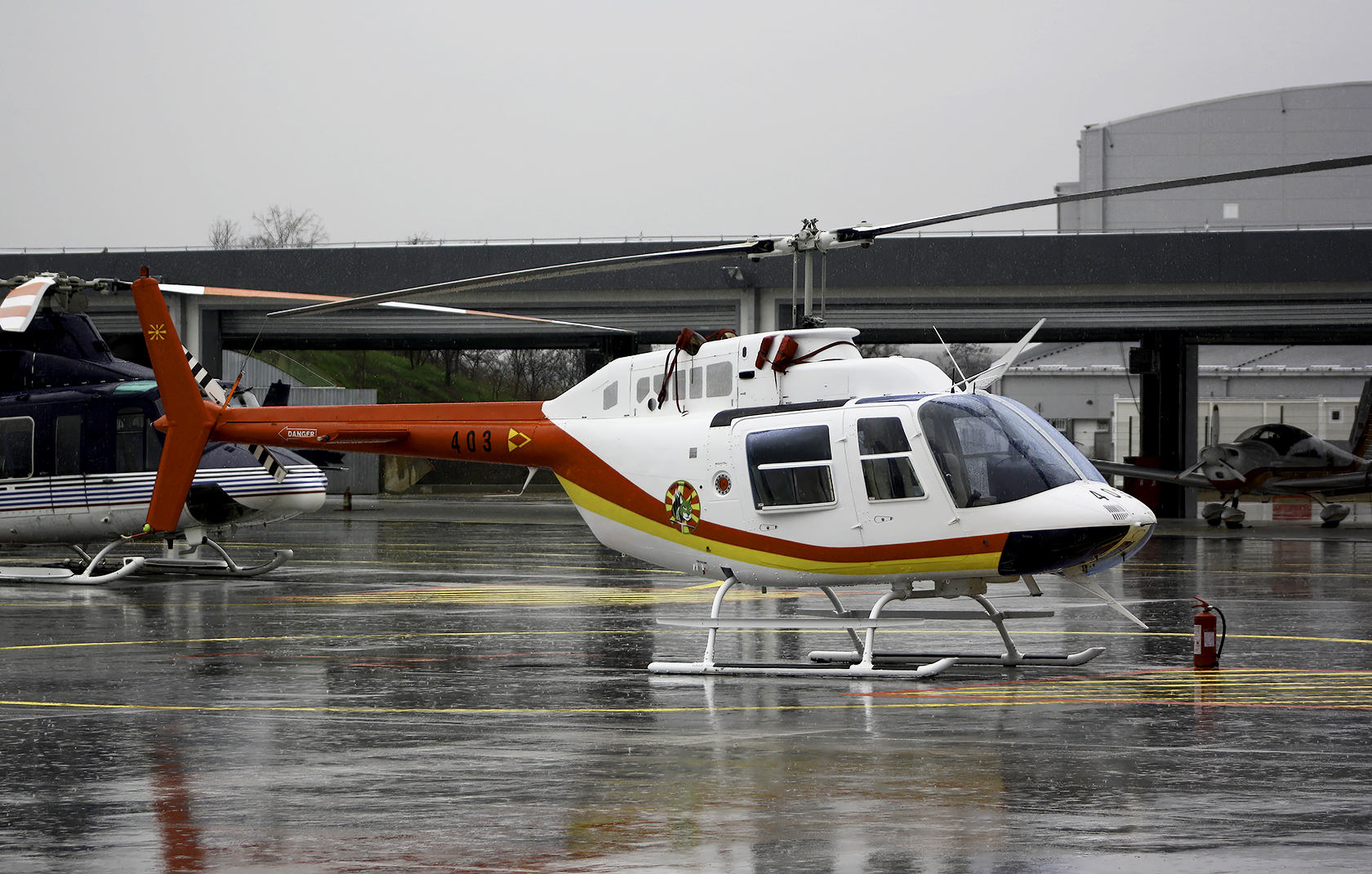
  - Air Force Technical Maintenance Squadron

=== Special Operations Regiment ===
Special Operations Regiment, is the main command for Special Units of the Army of Republic of North Macedonia. Under the command of the Special Operations Regiment are, The Special Forces Battalion "Wolves" and The Rangers Battalion as well as a Regimental Headquarters Company and Logistical Support Company.

Special Forces Battalion "Wolves" was formed in 1994. It consists of a Headquarters and an undisclosed number of Special Forces detachments and specializes in covert actions, Foreign Internal Defence assistance, Special Reconnaissance, Counter Terrorist operations, and Drug interdiction tasks. Its members wear the Maroon Beret.

The Rangers Battalion was formed in 2004. It consists of a Headquarters and 3 Reconnaissance and Direct Action Companies, its members wear the Ranger Green Beret. Since 2004 the unit has gone through an intensive development period and has put effort into improving its operative ability and its readiness to manage the challenges of modern conflicts.

The Mission of Special Operations Regiment is to provide fully organized, trained and equipped units to perform special operations and conventional specific operations, independently or in cooperation with other units of the Army and other coalition forces, in all weather and land conditions during peace, crisis and war and to support peace and conflict prevention as part of overall efforts to support internal security and foreign policy of the Republic of North Macedonia.

==== Missions outside the Republic of North Macedonia ====
- Special Operations Regiment from June 2003 to June 2008 attended by 11 contingents of rotations in the "Iraqi Freedom".
- Participation in Peacekeeping "ISAF-Phoenix" in Afghanistan from May to December 2010.
- Participation of individuals within the missions in Bosnia, Lebanon and Afghanistan.

==== Decorations awarded ====
- Order of Merit assigned to 14 August 2012, the President of the Republic of North Macedonia, Mr. Dr. Ivanov marking the 20th anniversary of the establishment of the Army of Republic of North Macedonia;
- Medal for bravery (6)
- Bronze Star (8)
- Achievement medal (43)
- ARCOM medal (68)
- NATO medal (46)
- Altea medal (2)

=== Logistics Support Brigade ===
Formed in 2001, the Logistics Command oversees all combat service support operations, and controls the Land Forces Logistic Base and the Military Hospital. Mission: Planning, organizing, coordinating and executing logistical support to commands and units of the Army of the Republic of North Macedonia, of level II and III.

Tasks:

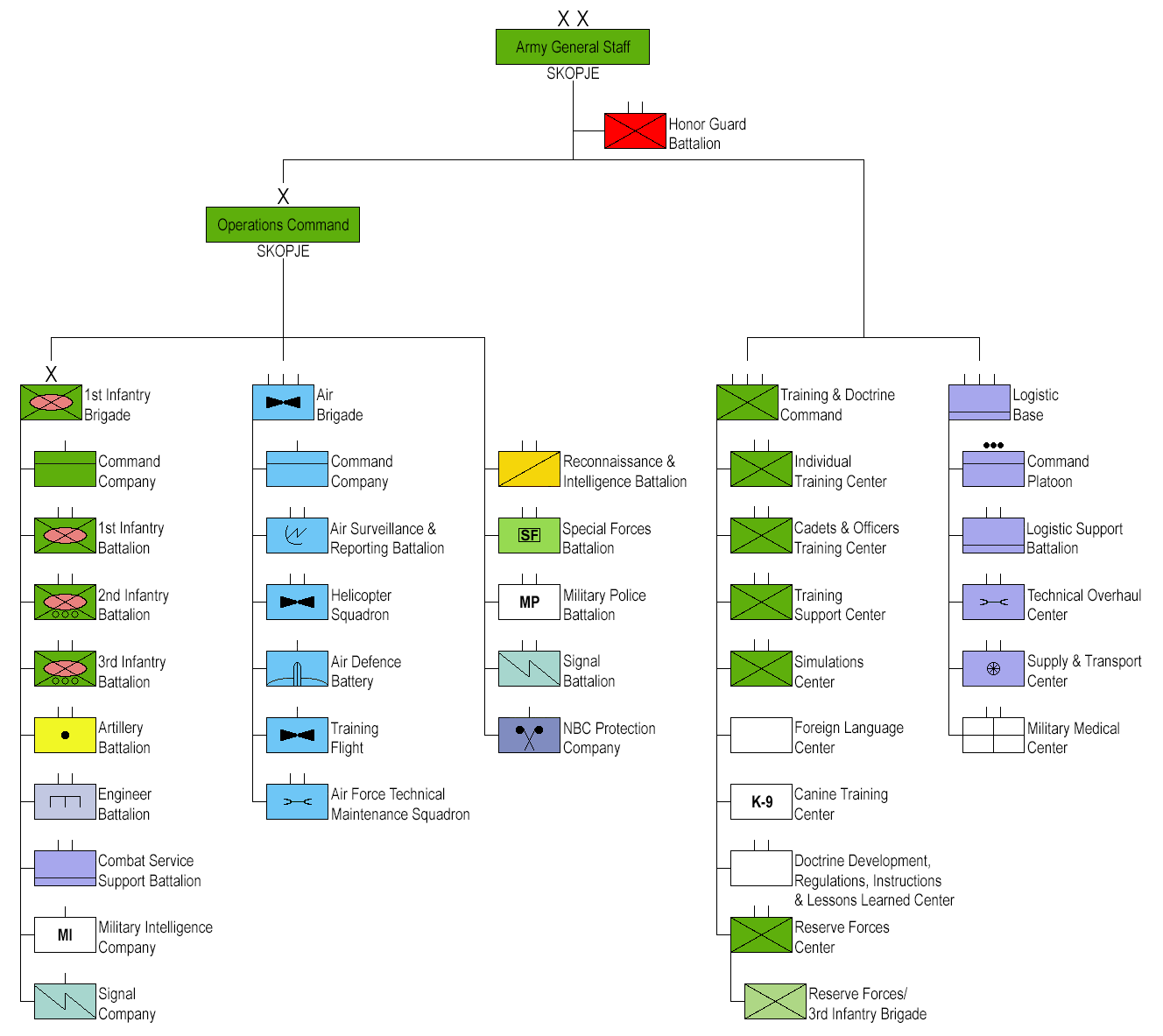
Organization of the Army of the Republic of North Macedonia 2024

1. Planning, organizing, coordinating and executing logistical support in the following functional areas:

- supply
- maintenance and repair
- movement and transport
- medical and veterinary support
- infrastructure
- services

2. Management with materials of all classes of supply for the commands and units of the Army

3. Storage and maintenance of material supplies for the Army according to specified criteria

4. Strengthening the logistics capacity of the Army in conducting training, work in field conditions, combat engagement and participation in missions

5. Coordinating support of allied forces in transit or maintain in the territory of the Republic of North Macedonia

6. Execution of logistical support for the administrative bodies and bodies of local self-governments, organizations, associations, etc. (in special circumstances and for special orders and instructions)

=== Other commands ===
Chief of General Staff include ELINT Center and the Honor Guard Unit.

=== Command for Training and Doctrines ===
Command for Training and Doctrines Organization, coordination and dimensional task of training the individual soldiers, cadets, NCOs and officers of the active and reserve forces, support collective training commands and units of the Army of the Republic and the development of doctrine and lessons learned in the Army of Republic of North Macedonia.In particular for meeting NATO requirements.

In order to improve the quality of training of the Army in 1996, were established several centers for basic and specialized training of individual soldiers, and collective training was done in the units. Centers were established to train: infantry, artillery, logistics, border guards, military police and reconnaissance.

== See also ==
- The Rangers Battalion
- 1st Mechanized Infantry Brigade
- Ceremonial Guard Battalion
- Military Reserve Force (North Macedonia)
- Military Service for Security and Intelligence

== Gallery ==
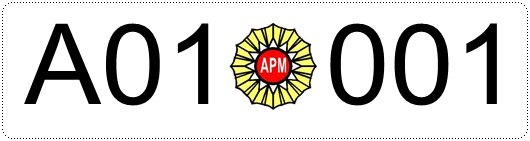
License plate of the former Army of the Republic of Macedonia

Roundel of North Macedonia's air force
