= North Macedonia Air Brigade =

Air warfare branch of North Macedonia's military

- Воздухопловен ВИНГ
- North Macedonia Air Brigade seal
- Founded: 10 June 1992; 34 years ago
- Country: North Macedonia
- Type: Air force
- Part of: Army of the Republic of North Macedonia
- Garrison/HQ: Skopje International Airport, Skopje
- Motto: "On the way to the stars"
- Engagements: 2001 Macedonian insurgency
- Website: Official website

Commanders
- Current commander: Colonel Igorcho Stoimenovski

Insignia
- Roundel

- Fin flash

Aircraft flown
- Observation helicopter: Mil Mi-17
- Trainer helicopter: Bell 206
- Reconnaissance: RQ-11
- Trainer: Zlín Z 42, Zlín Z 43
- Transport: Mil Mi-17

The North Macedonia Air Brigade (Macedonian: Воздухопловен ВИНГ, romanized: Vozduhoploven VING) is the air warfare and air defense force of the Army of the Republic of North Macedonia.

== History ==
The development of the Macedonian Air Brigade began in 1992.

The UTVA-66 and UTVA-75 were the first aircraft types to be introduced into the Macedonian Air Warfare and Air Defence Forces. Upon its creation, the Macedonian Air Warfare and Air Defence Forces operated one UTVA-66 and four UTVA-75 A21 two-seat trainers, all leased from the Macedonian Aeronautical Union (Makedonski Vozduhoploven Sojuz).

After full-scale conflict began in 1991 in the newly independent republics of Croatia and Bosnia and Herzegovina, the United Nations Security Council unanimously adopted a resolution, requesting an immediate UN arms embargo on Bosnia-Herzegovina, Croatia, the Federal Republic of Yugoslavia, Macedonia and Slovenia. This resolution was viewed by Macedonia as unfair, because Macedonia was the only one of the former Yugoslav Republics that had gained its independence as a state through peaceful means. In 1994, the Macedonian Air Force and Air Defence Forces acquired four biplanes built in the 1980s from Ukraine. Because of the arms embargo they were delivered to the Macedonian Air Force and Air Defence Forces with civil registrations. In 1996, the Security Council excluded Macedonia from the UN arms embargo. Shortly after this all four Mi-17 helicopters of the Macedonian Air Force and Air Defence Forces were painted in camouflage schemes and received military serial numbers.

Four Zlin 242L two-seat trainers were acquired from the Czech Republic in 1995. They are suitable for basic, aerobatic, navigation, instrument and night flying, for formation flying and combat maneuvers. One Zlin 242L was lost on April 7, 1999 when it crashed about 1 kilometer west of Mantovo Accumulation Lake, near Radoviš, with the pilot escaping with minor injuries.

In recent years, rumours have surfaced about possible fresh acquisitions by the Macedonian Air Warfare and Air Defence Forces. However, all of these rumours appeared either to be untrue or the acquisitions failed to materialise. The Macedonian Air Warfare and Air Defence Forces will not take delivery of new build L-59, second-hand Turkish F-5, second-hand Bulgarian MiG-21bis and Mi-24D. The delivery of 16 ex-German Army Bo-105M helicopters will also not take place.

During the Kosovo crisis, the Macedonian Air Warfare and Air Defence Forces relocated all its aircraft to relatively safe locations, deep within Macedonian territory, from where it was actively involved in monitoring the troubled borders with Kosovo and Albania, as well as supplying a number of Kosovar Albanian refugee camps with food, water, and medical care.

After the withdrawal of Yugoslav Army from Kosovo and the deployment of KFOR in Kosovo, the UN began the process of disarming the Kosovo Liberation Army (KLA). Beginning in spring 2000, Albanian insurgents launched a large number of frontal assaults on police stations, checkpoints, and border outposts in southern Serbia and Macedonia. All of these events indicated that a large part of already disbanded KLA was still active in a form of two new liberation armies: The Liberation Army of Preshevo, Medvedja, Bujanovac in southern Serbia, and the National Liberation Army in Macedonia.

The crisis between ethnic Albanian insurgents and Macedonian government forces broke out in March 2001. During the fighting, the Macedonian Air Warfare and Air Defence Forces rapidly expanded itself through the delivery of an additional twenty aircraft. The first large-quantity delivery of new aircraft to the Macedonian Air Warfare and Air Defence Forces was made on March 23 with Macedonia purchasing four Mi-8MT combat helicopters from Ukraine, that served with Ukrainian contingent of KFOR in Kosovo, as well as an additional two Mi-24V Hind-E attack helicopters. The Greek government delivered two UH-1H Huey helicopters to the Macedonian Air Warfare and Air Defence Forces as well. On April 15, two more Mi-24 gunships were delivered followed by another shipment of four on June 15 and two on September 4. In June 2001, four Su-25 (three Su-25 and one Su-25UB) arrived from Ukraine, making them the first combat fighters for the Macedonian Air Warfare and Air Defence Force. In December 2001, the Macedonian Air Warfare and Air Defence Force received two Mi-24K Hind-G2 (photo-reconnaissance and artillery spotting version of Mi-24) helicopters from Ukraine.

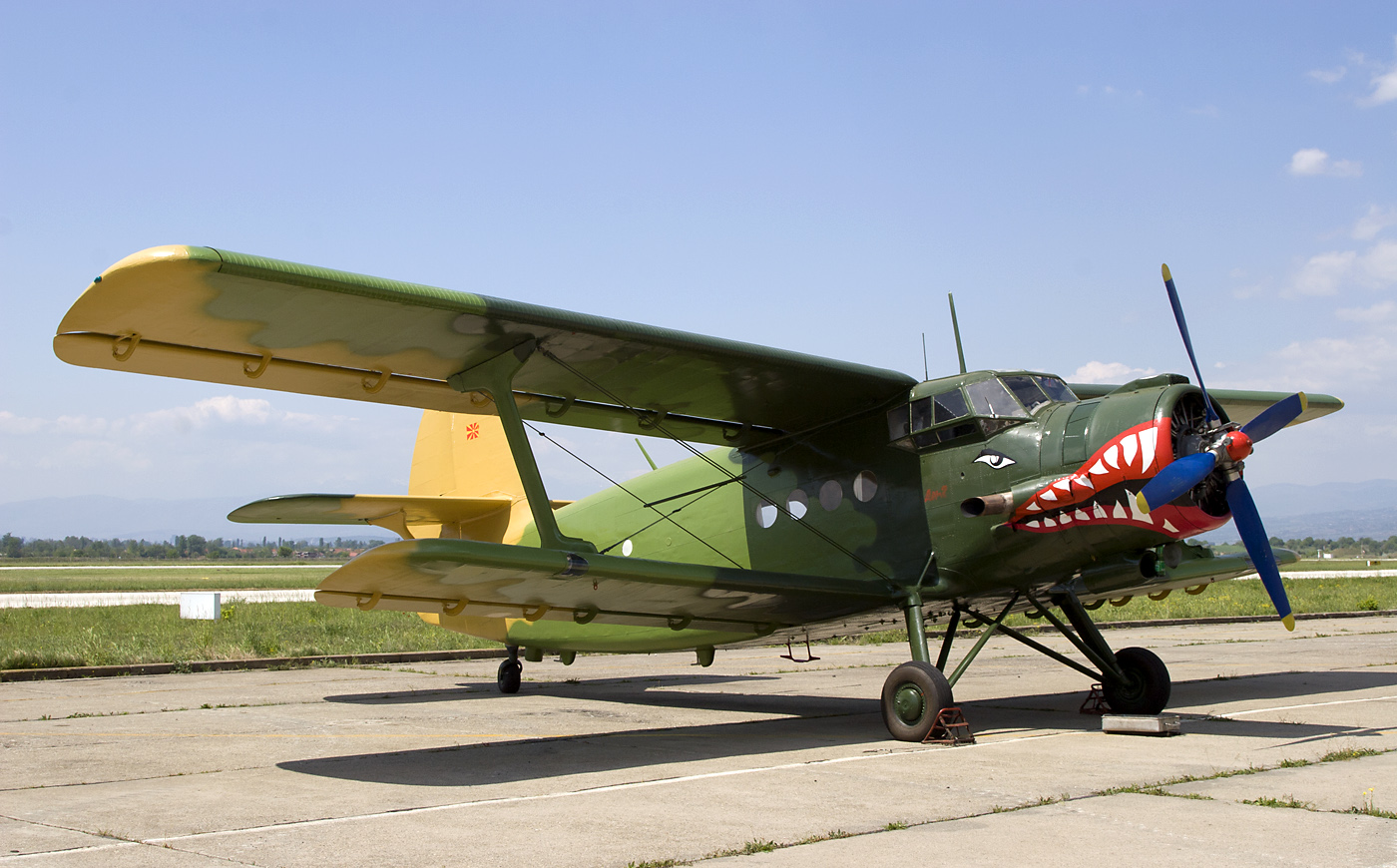
Macedonian Air Brigade An-2

On the dawn of 25 March, as a response to assaults by Albanian insurgents on the town of Tetovo in northern Macedonia, government security forces launched a full-scale offensive in order to neutralize and eliminate them. In this operation, Macedonian Security forces used Mi-17 transport helicopters and recently acquired Mi-8MT combat helicopters. This was the first time that Macedonian Air Warfare and Air Defence Force aircraft were involved in combat operations. On June 23, one Su-25 took off from Petrovec Air base and conducted a reconnaissance over Arachinovo village where heavy fighting was underway. This was the first time in the history of Macedonia that a fixed wing Macedonian Air Warfare and Air Defence Forces combat aircraft had operated from a Macedonian air base.

According to the Macedonian Ministry of Interior Affairs, Albanian insurgents in Macedonia were in possession of large stockpiles of anti-aircraft weapons that included a number of FIM-92 Stinger and Strela-2M (NATO: SA-7b Grail) man-portable, low-altitude SAM systems, 100+ anti-aircraft cannons and 500+ anti-aircraft heavy guns. Despite this large quantity of anti-aircraft weapons in the hands of the insurgents, no aircraft of the Macedonian Air Warfare and Air Defence Forces was lost to ground fire. The only loss of an aircraft incurred by the Macedonian Air Warfare and Air Defence Forces was the crash of the Mi-17 helicopter on March 17, after the helicopter's rotor blade struck a flag pole during takeoff at a hotel in the Popova Shapka ski resort.

During the fighting, a number of rumors circulated about possible acquisitions by the Macedonian Air Warfare and Air Defence Forces. This included the reports that Macedonia was attempting to acquire six J-21 Jastreb ground attack aircraft from Yugoslavia and ten Pilatus Britten-Norman BN2T-4S Defender 4000 multi-sensor surveillance from an unnamed country. On a few occasions there were also reports that Macedonian Air Warfare and Air Defence Forces was operating two Kamov Ka-50 Hokum close-support helicopters acquired from Russia. The Macedonian Ministry of Defence denied these reports. More questionable reporting arose in June when Macedonian media reported that the country was negotiating with Ukraine to buy six MiG-29 Fulcrum fighters. This was followed in early August by Greek media reports that Turkey was offering Macedonia a lease of two squadrons of F-16C/D Fighting Falcon fighter aircraft. Additional rumours circulated in early August when the Sunday Times reported that Macedonia was contemplating purchasing the Su-25 Scorpion, a new "retrofit" version of the Frogfoot, complete with Israeli avionics fitted in the former Soviet republic of Georgia.

As a part of succession of property and equipment of the former Yugoslav People's Army, on October 18, Yugoslavia offered Macedonia a litany of weapons and equipment that the country was ready to deliver to the Macedonian Army. According to initial Macedonian media reports, the country, among others, would receive four G-4 Super Galeb jets, one An-26 transport aircraft, one Yak-40 transport aircraft, cabinets for pilot training for the Macedonian Military Academy "General Mihailo Apostolski", and surface-to-air missile systems. As of today, there are no updates regarding the possibility of delivering Yugoslav weapons and equipment to Macedonia which raised doubts about the credibility of the reports.

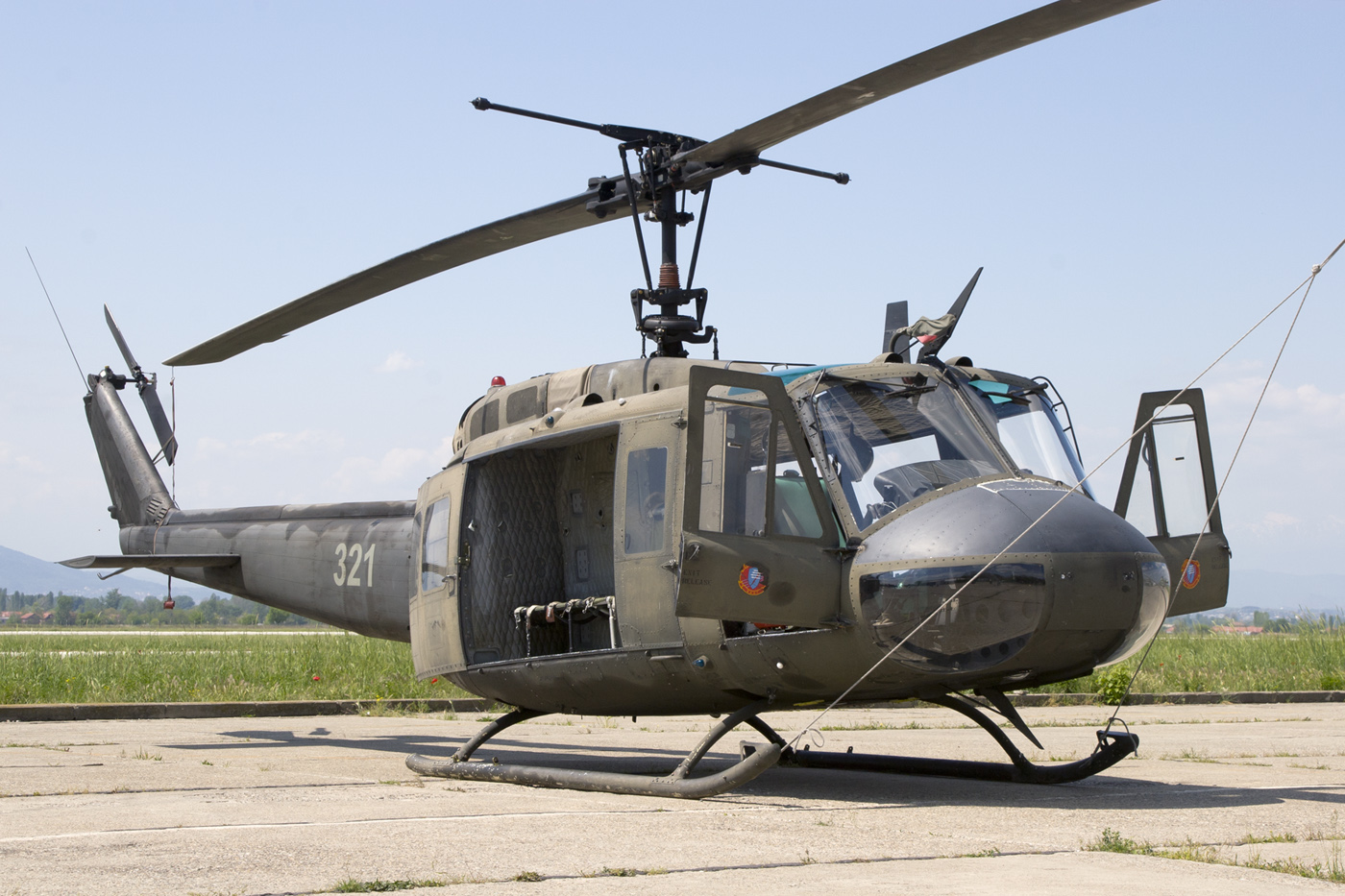
UH-1H

In December 2001, a new organizational structure of the Macedonian Air Warfare and Air Defence Forces was implemented. Until then, the Macedonian Air Force and Air Defence Forces Aviation Brigade (Avio Brigada) was organized in three squadrons: 101. AE, 101 Attack Fighter Squadron (101. Avijaciska Eskadrila), 201. POHE, 201 Anti Armour Helicopter Squadron (201. Protiv Oklopna Helikopterska Eskadrila) and 301. TRHE, 301 Transport Helicopter Squadron (301. Transportna Helikopterska Eskadrila). With the latest changes in the organization of the Macedonian Air Warfare and Air Defence Forces, Aviation Brigade (Avio Brigada) became Airborne Battalion (Avio Bataljon), and Squadron (Eskadrila) became Company (Cheta), and AE became 101. ACh, 101 Aviation Company (101. Avijaciska Cheta), 201. POHE became 201. POHCh, 201 Anti Armour Helicopter Company (201. Protiv Oklopna Helikopterska Cheta) and 301. TRHE became 301. TRHCh, 301 Transport Helicopter Company (301. Transportna Helikopterska Cheta). As part of this reorganization of the Macedonian Air Warfare and Air Defence Forces, new companies were also established. Named as 401. ShTCh, 401 Training Company (401, Shkolsko Trenazna Cheta), this company now operates four Zlin 242Ls, a single Zlin 143L and two UH-1Hs. Before coming part of the 401. ShTCh, the four original Zlin 242L two-seat trainers were part of the 101. AE and UH-1H helicopters were part of the 301. TRHE. In 2003 a four-seat Zlin 143L and one more two-seat Zlin 242L were acquired from the Macedonian Authority for Civil Aeronautical Transport and Traffic. Training on the new Zlins will start early 2004 when the original three Zlin 242s will go to Moravan Aeroplanes in the Czech Republic for overhaul.

The Macedonian Air Warfare and Air Defense Forces elite 501st Special Parachute Detachment (501. Padobransko Diverzantski Odred) or "501. PDO" called "Falcons" (Sokoli) was officially revealed during a military exercise that took place at the Cojlija military range, near Petrovec Air Base, on May 28, 2002.

The exercise activities of 501 Special Parachute Detachment" The "Falcons" encompassed a technical presentation of the equipment and the weaponry, combat search and rescue (CSAR) of pilots in hostile territory with a tactical operation called "Small Diamond. The 501 Special Parachute Detachment" The "Falcons" also demonstrated the capability of directing Macedonian Air Warfare aircraft and cannon/rocket artillery fire towards enemy positions as a Joint Operations Terminal Attack Control (JOTAC) Team, marksmanship skills from Mi-8MT and Mi-24V helicopters, parachute jumps using static line and high-altitude low-opening (HALO) parachutes, and concluding with a simulated raid and capture of air base facilities.

The 501. PDO is under the command of the Macedonian Air Warfare and Air Defence Force and its main task is search and rescue, medical evacuation of downed aircrew, and pathfinding for follow on air mobile and vehicle mounted forces. In the event of a natural disaster, its objective is to assist the civilian population. Members of the 501. PDO are all experienced professional soldiers who have participated in missions involving NATO and Partnership for Peace member states. According to Major Goran Grujevski, the 501.PDO aim is to become the most elite unit of the Macedonian Army.

The creation of 501. PDO has resulted in the need for equipping the Macedonian Air Warfare and Air Defence Forces with transport aircraft. Macedonian media reported that the Macedonian government, on its session held on April 2, 2002, decided to refuse the initiative for buying one An-74 Coaler transport aircraft from Ukraine for a price of approximately US$6 million. In December 2002 the Russian government proposed to pay off some old debts to Yugoslavia that were inherited by Macedonia with a transport aircraft (An-74?). Because of uncertainty regarding Macedonian acquisition of An-74, Macedonian Air Warfare and Air Defence Forces acquired one An-2 transport aircraft from Macedonian aviation club "Kumanovo" in 2003. The An-2 will be used for parachute training of the 501. PDO until a new An-74 or other transport aircraft becomes part of the Macedonian Air Warfare and Air Defence Forces. 501. PDO uses Mi-24V, Mi-8MT, An-2R, and sometimes UH-1H aircraft

North Macedonia was one of nine Central and Eastern European countries that are actively seeking membership in NATO. In a desire to meet all obligations for full integration and membership in NATO, North Macedonia equipped its Air Warfare and Air Defence Forces with fighters and helicopters with NATO compatible communication systems. For better protection of its borders with Kosovo and Albania, especially at night, North Macedonia plans to equip a few Air Force and Air Defence Forces helicopters with FLIR equipment. Priority in acquisitions for the North Macedonia Air Brigade and Air Defence Forces in the future will be equipping utility helicopters. The four Su-25 Frogfoots were withdrawn from use in 2004. North Macedonia has no intention of operating jet fighters in the future and will depend on its NATO allies for air cover.

=== Structure ===
Current Organization

- Pilot Training Center (Bell 206B-3)
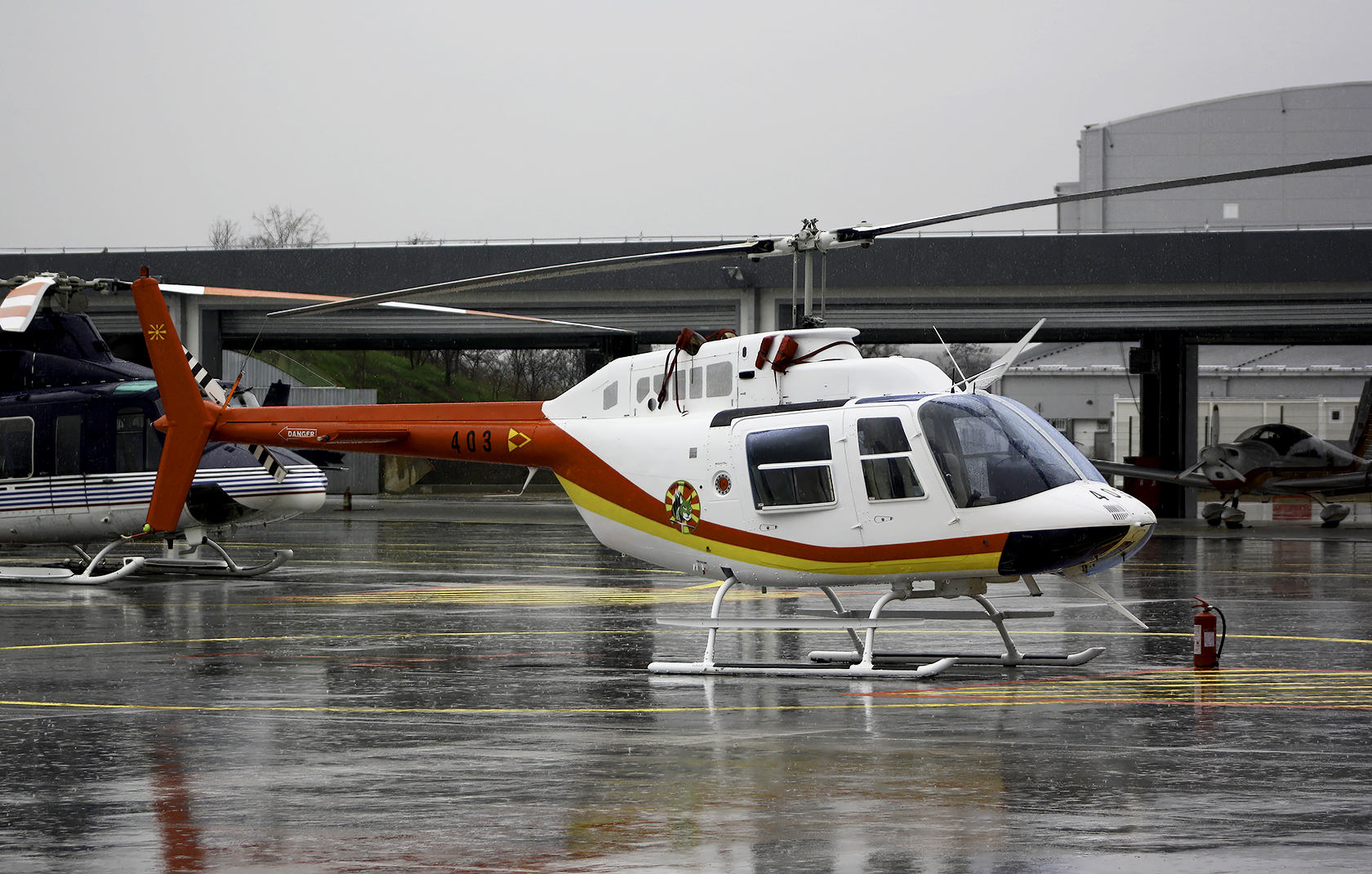
- Training Squadron (Zlin 242L and Zlin 143L)
- Transport Helicopter Squadron (MI-8)
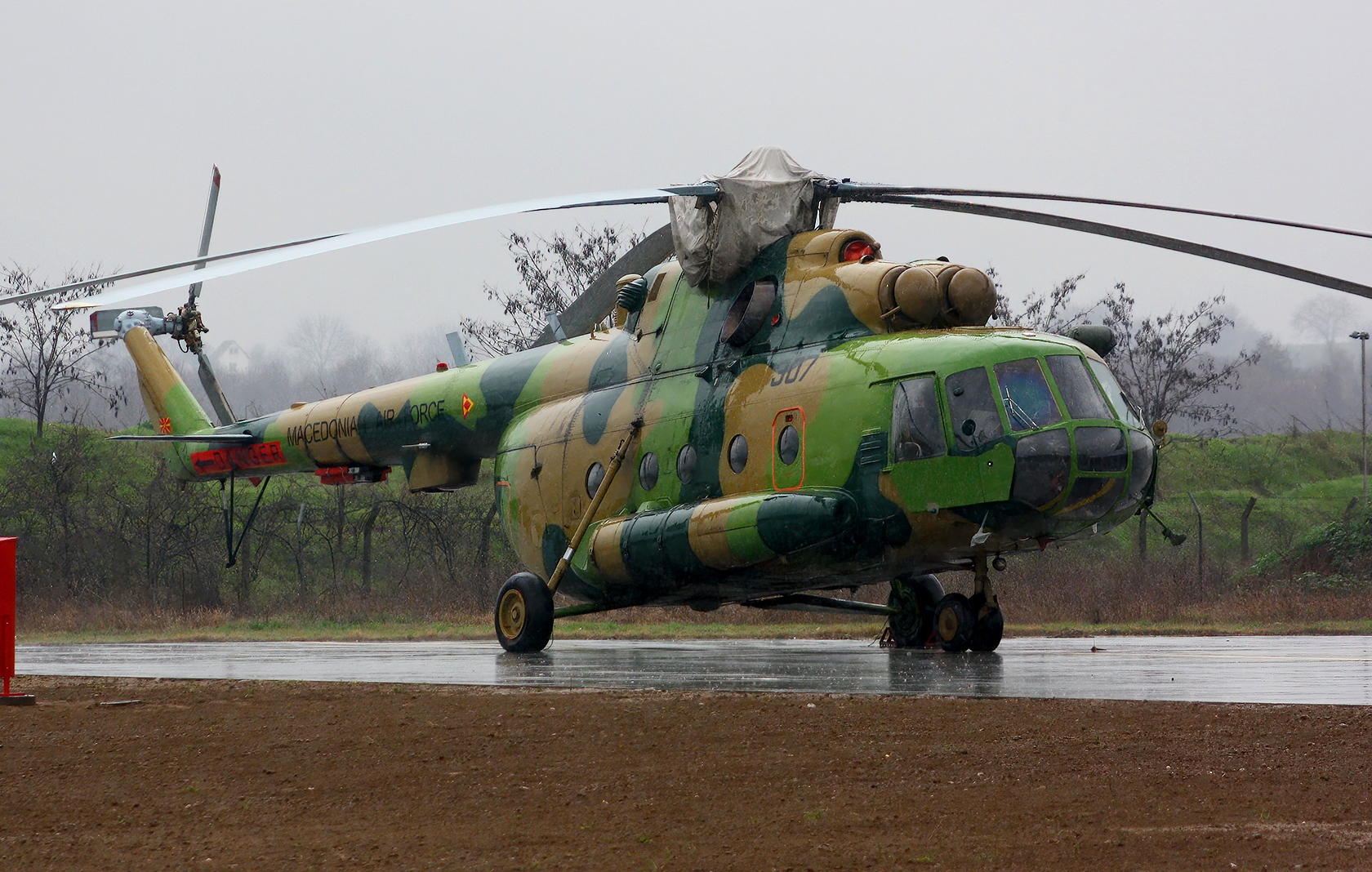
- Air Surveillance and Air Target Acquisition Transmission Company
- Air Defence Battalion "Cobras" (9K35 Strela-10)
- Logistical Support Squadron

2001 Organization

- 101st Aviation Squadron (Su-25/UB)
- 201st Anti-armour Helicopter Squadron (Mi-24V/K)
- 301st Transport Helicopter Squadron (Mi-8MT/17(8SMT)
- 401st Training Squadron (Zlin 242L and Bell UH-1 Iroquois)
- 501st Parachute Special Detachment "Falcons" (An-2R)

== Aircraft ==
=== Current inventory ===
Aircraft	Origin	Type	Variant	In service	Notes
Helicopter (6)
Mil Mi-17	Soviet Union	Transport / Utility		2	Two crashes have occurred: one in 2001 and another in 2008. To be retired.
Mil Mi-8	Soviet Union	Transport / Utility	Mil MI-8MTV	4	
AW149	Italy	Transport / Utility			4 on order
AW169	Italy	Transport / Utility	AW169M		4 on order
Trainer aircraft (10)
Zlín Z 42	Czechoslovakia	Trainer	242	5	
Zlín Z 43	Czechoslovakia	Trainer	143	1	
Bell 206	United States	Trainer		4	

Republic of North Macedonia government has also a Learjet business jet that is not part of the air force.

=== Retired ===
Retired Sukhoi Su-25

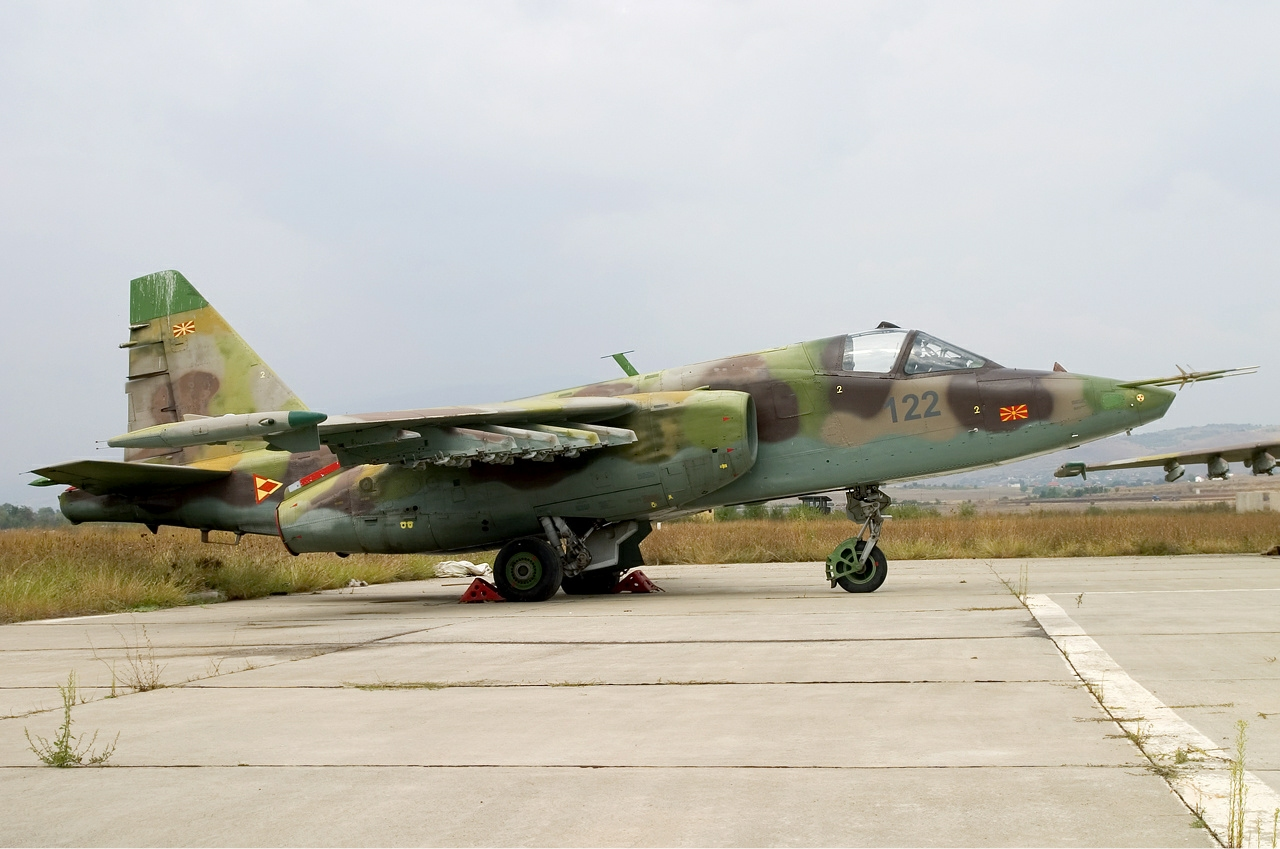
Retired in 2007

North Macedonia purchased four Sukhoi Su-25 close air support jets in 2001 during the Albanian insurgency. Of the four, three were one-seat models from Ukraine, while the last was a two-seat model from Belarus (but sold via Ukraine). These aircraft were out of service by 2004 and left outside in non-flyable condition at Skopje International Airport for several years. The aircraft were donated to Ukraine in 2022 during the Russian invasion of the country.

UTVA 75 trainers were once on loan from the local aeroclubs, all where retired by 2000.

Two UH-1H/D Hueys were donated by Greece in 2001 and retired by 2009.

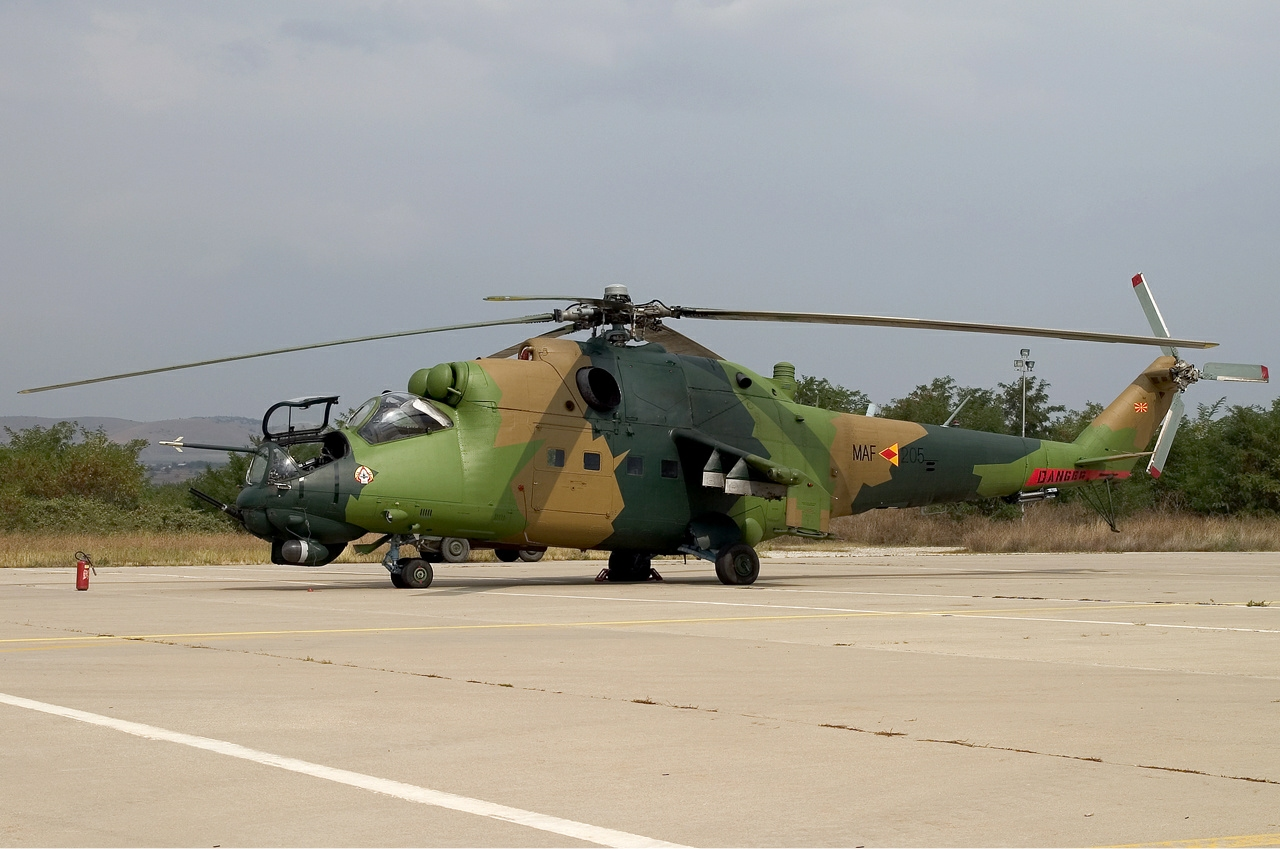
A Macedonian Mil Mi-24 sits on the tarmac of Skopje International airport; all Mi-24s have been retired and donated to Ukraine

North Macedonia delivered 12 Mi-24 helicopters to Ukraine's Armed Forces in 2023. In a show of support for Ukraine during the Russian invasion, North Macedonia donated its entire fleet of Mil Mi-24 attack helicopters to Ukraine. The donation included all 12 helicopters that North Macedonia had in its inventory.

== See also ==
- SFR Yugoslav Air Force
- 2008 Macedonian Armed Forces Mil Mi-17 crash
- Special Forces Battalion
- The Rangers Battalion
- Military Service for Security and Intelligence
