= Military Reserve Force (North Macedonia) =

Reserve Forces
- Резервни сили
- Active: April 1, 1992 - Present
- Country: North Macedonia
- Allegiance: ARM
- Size: 26,000
- Part of: Reserve forces command
- Nickname(s): Reserves, (Macedonian: Резервисти)
- Colors: Khaki-Green
- Engagements: Insurgency in the Republic of Macedonia

Commanders
- Current commander: Colonel Kjiro Kalkov

The Military Reserve Force (Macedonian: Резервисти на АРМ, romanized: Rezervisti na ARM, lit. 'Reservists of the ARM') is a military unit of North Macedonia. It is part of Army of the Republic of Macedonia's Joint Operational Command. The organization was formed from the Territorial Defense units of the Socialist Federative Republic of Yugoslavia.

== Mission ==
- Unit of the ARM from a priority reserve designed to defend the sovereignty and integrity of the Republic of North Macedonia
- It provides carrying out of attack and defense actions on the entire territory of the Republic of North Macedonia
- The 3rd Infantry Brigade personnel is professional and from the reserve

== Tasks ==
- Continuation of the planned transformation and restructuring of the brigade and bringing the training close to NATO standards
- Training of the brigade commands and units
- Recruiting and equipping the brigade with material and technical resources and men

== 2001 Albanian Unrest ==
Ten reservists were killed in the Karpalak Massacre and three were wounded. A monument was built in their home town of Prilep in 2013.

== See also ==
- Army of the Republic of North Macedonia

== Gallery ==
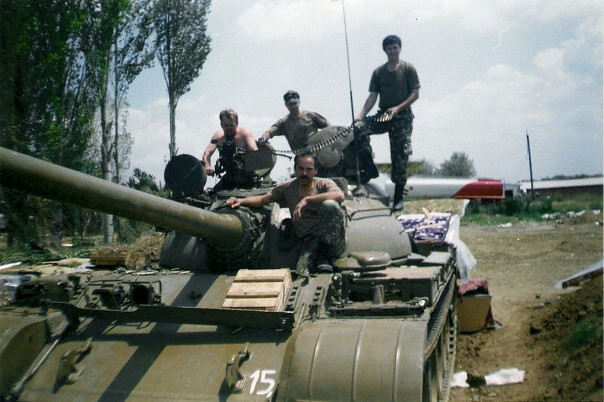
Military Reserve Force in 2001 in Arachinovo
