= List of Macedonians (ethnic group) =

This is a list of notable Macedonians and people of Macedonian descent sorted by occupation, regardless of any political, territorial or other divisions, historical or modern.

== Academia ==
=== Scientists ===
- Blaga Aleksova (1922–2007), archaeologist
- Svetlana Antonovska (born 1952–2016), statistician
- Ana Čolović Lešoska (born 1979), biologist
- Georgi Efremov (1932–2011), biologist
- Leonid Grčev (born 1951), electrical engineer
- Martin Guleski (born 1945), architect
- Ratko Janev (1939–2019), atomic physicist
- Nataša Jonoska (born 1961), mathematician
- Saško Kedev (born 1962), physician, cardiologist
- Ljupčo Kocarev (born 1955), physicist and engineer
- Pasko Kuzman (born 1947), archaeologist
- Petar Popovski (born 1973), electrical engineer
- Zoran T. Popovski (born 1962), biologist
- Paskal Sotirovski (1927–2003), astrophysicist
- Aneta Stefanovska, biophysicist
- Boris P. Stoicheff (1924–2010), physicist

=== Social academics ===
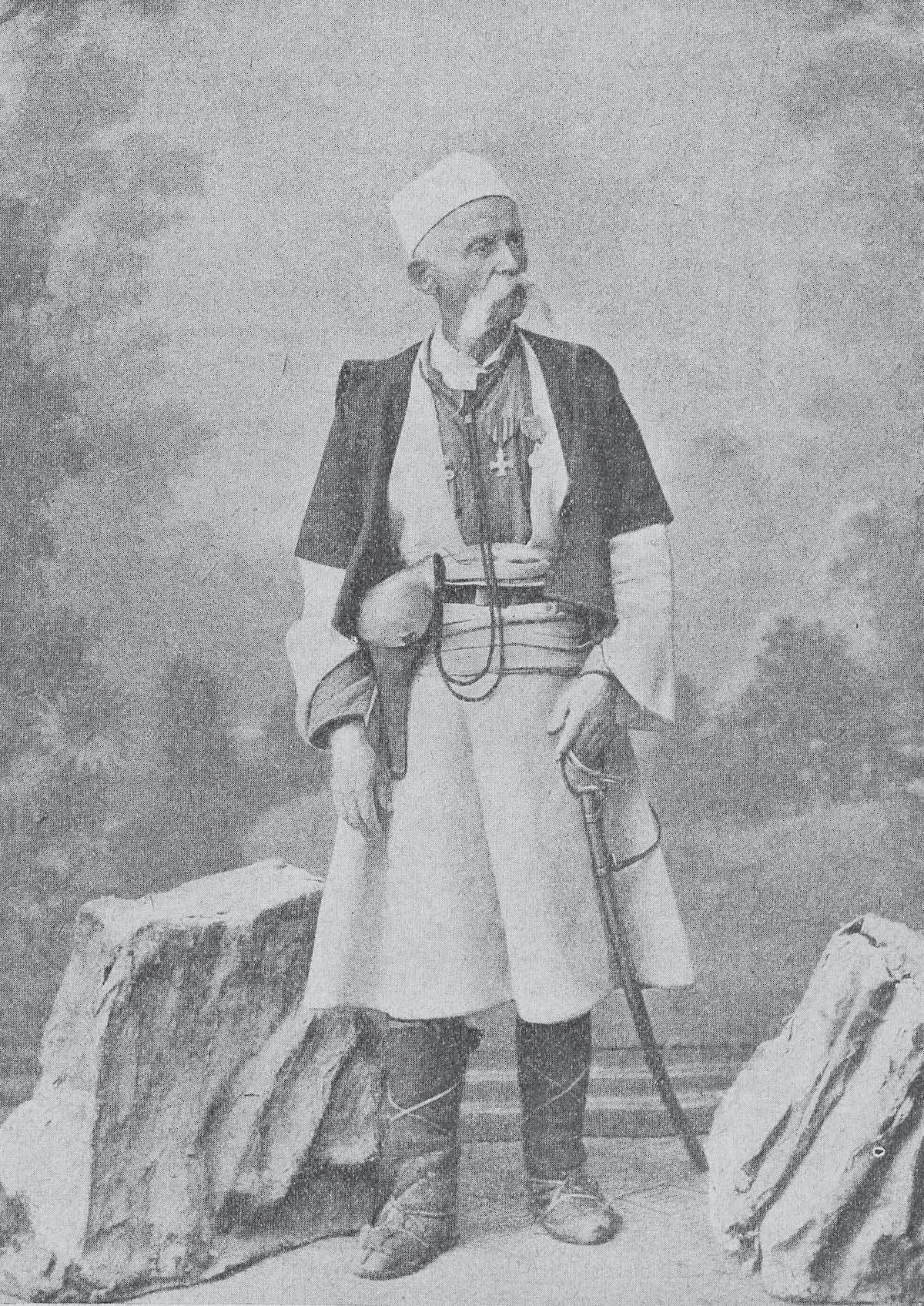
Georgi Pulevski

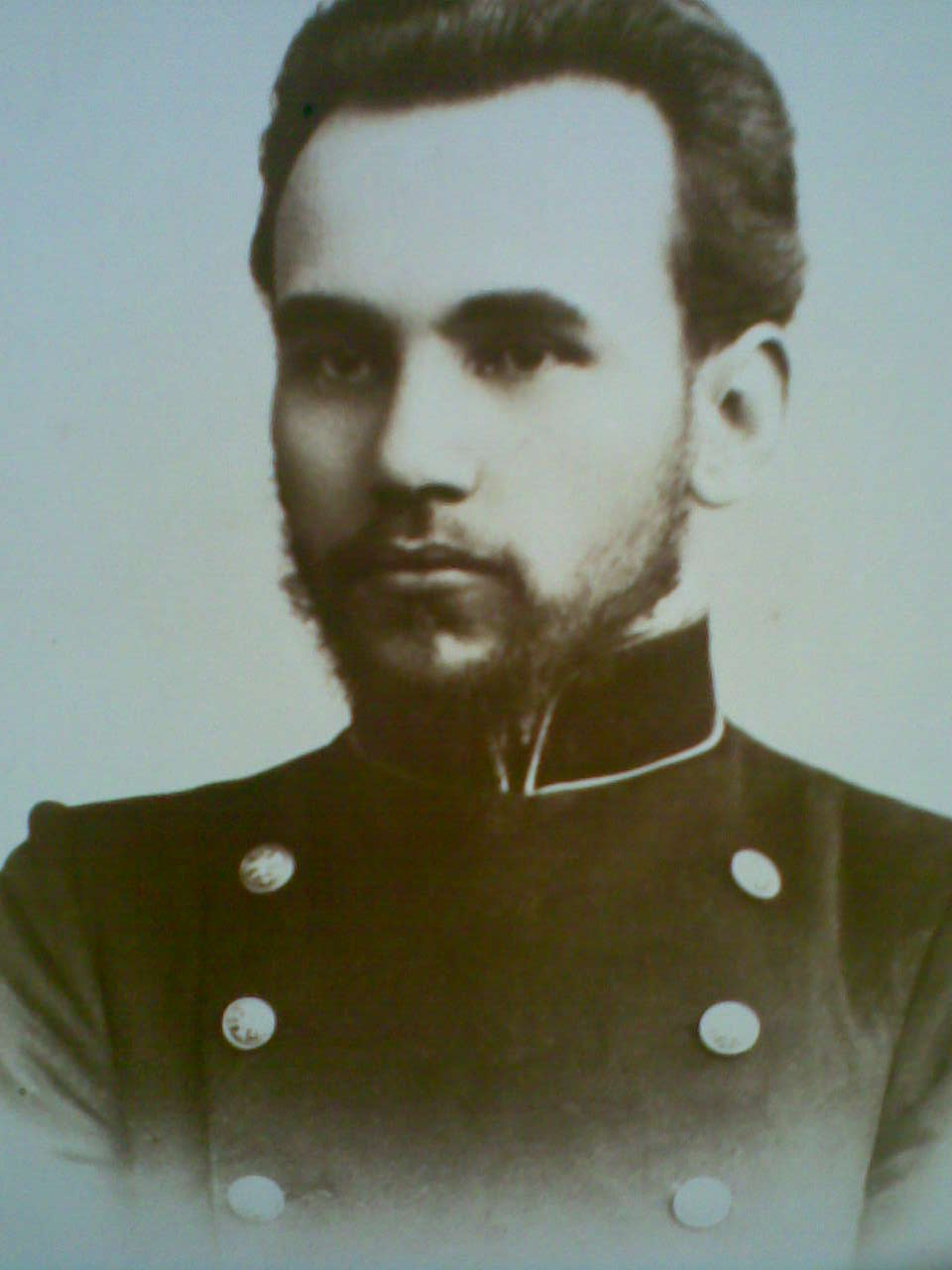
Dimitrija Čupovski

- Svetlana Antonovska (1952–2016), statistician
- Despot Badžović (1850–1932), teacher and activist
- Dimitrija Čupovski (1878–1940), Macedonian national activist
- Nace Dimov (1876–1916), Macedonian national activist
- Naum Evro, among the first Macedonists; a founder and member of the Sofia-based organization Secret Macedonian Committee
- Kosta Grupče (1849–1907), among the first Macedonists, a founder and leader of the Secret Macedonian Committee
- Stojan Kočov (1930–2023), historian, partisan, scientist and publisher
- Slavko Milosavlevski (1928–2012), sociologist
- Mihail Petruševski (1911–1990), founder of the College of Philosophy at Ss. Cyril and Methodius University of Skopje
- Temko Popov (1855–1929)
- Gjorgji Pulevski (1817–1893), first-known author to publicly express in 1875 the idea of a separate Macedonian nation and language
- Andrew Rossos (born 1941), professor emeritus of History at the University of Toronto
- Dragan Taškovski (1917–1980), historian

== Arts ==
=== Music ===
==== Classical music ====
===== Composers =====
Todor Skalovski

- Dimitrije Bužarovski (born 1952)
- Tanja Carovska (born 1980)
- Petar Georgiev-Kalica (born 1951)
- Jonče Hristovski (1931–2000)
- Zoran Madzirov (1968–2017)
- Kiril Makedonski (1925–1984)
- Tale Ognenovski (1922–2012)
- Ilija Pejovski (born 1947)
- Toma Prošev (1931–1996)
- Todor Skalovski (1909–2004), composer of the Macedonian national anthem "Today over Macedonia"
- Stojan Stojkov (born 1941)

===== Conductors =====
- Borjan Canev (born 1973)

===== Instrumentalists =====
Pianists

- Duke Bojadziev (born 1972)
- Dimitrije Bužarovski (born 1952)
- Simon Kiselicki (born 1974)
- Simon Trpčeski (born 1979)

===== Opera singers =====
- Igor Durlovski (born 1977)
- Blagoj Nacoski (born 1979)
- Boris Trajanov (born 1959)

==== Popular and folk music ====
===== Composers =====
- Darko Dimitrov (born 1973)
- Slave Dimitrov (born 1946)
- Jovan Jovanov (born 1981)
- Ilija Pejovski (born 1947), composer and pianist
- Trajko Prokopiev (1909–1979), composer, who composed the soundtrack for the first Macedonian-language film, Frosina
- Tomislav Zografski (1934–2000)

===== Musicians =====
- Bodan Arsovski (born 1956)
- Kiril Džajkovski (born 1965)
- Chris Joannou (born 1979), bass guitarist
- Tale Ognenovski (1922–2012)
- Lars-Göran Petrov (1972–2021)
- Aleksandra Popovska (born 1975)
- Vlatko Stefanovski (born 1957)
- Stevo Teodosievski (1924–1997)
- Goran Trajkoski (born 1963)
- Branko Trajkov (born 1966)

===== Singers =====
- Lambe Alabakovski (born 1987)
- Bobi Andonov (born 1994)
- Kristina Arnaudova (born 1979)
- Kaliopi Bukle (born 1966)
- Vladimir Četkar, jazz guitarist
- Dani Dimitrovska (born 1979)
- Karolina Gočeva (born 1980)
- Vaska Ilieva (1923–2001)
- Andrijana Janevska (born 1981)
- Vlado Janevski (born 1960)
- Jovan Jovanov (born 1985)
- Aleksandar Makedonski
- Maika Makovski (born 1983)
- Jasmina Mukaetova (born 1981)
- Eva Nedinkovska (born 1983)
- Ljiljana Nikolovska (born 1964)
- Goce Nikolovski (1947–2006)
- Blagica Pavlovska (born 1958)
- Elena Petreska (born 1980)
- Toše Proeski (1981–2007)
- Elena Risteska (born 1986)
- Risto Samardžiev (born 1964)
- Aleksandar Sarievski (1922–2002)
- Dan Talevski (born 1992)
- Tamara Todevska (born 1985)
- Tijana Todevska-Dapčević (born 1976)
- Zoran Vanev (born 1973)
- Elena Velevska (born 1980)
- Rade Vrčakovski (born 1980)

=== Performing arts ===
==== Actors ====
- Kole Angelovski (born 1943)
- Igor Džambazov (born 1963), actor, singer, comedian
- Ljupka Džundeva (1934–2018)
- Zafir Hadžimanov (1943–2021), actor, singer, composer
- Jelena Jovanova (born 1984)
- Aco Jovanovski (1930–2016)
- Meto Jovanovski (1946–2023)
- Vlado Jovanovski (born 1967)
- Gjorgji Kolozov (1948–2003)
- Toni Mihajlovski (born 1967)
- Labina Mitevska (born 1975)
- Natasha Negovanlis (born 1990)
- Chris Petrovski (born 1991)
- Petre Prličko (1907–1995)
- Nikola Ristanovski (born 1969)
- Robert Veljanovski (born 1968)

==== Filmmakers ====
- Vladimir Blaževski (born 1955)
- Kiril Cenevski (1943–2019)
- Petar Gligorovski (1938–1995), animated film director and surrealist artist
- Igor Ivanov (born 1973)
- Tamara Kotevska (born 1993)
- Milčo Mančevski (born 1959), Golden Lion-winning director
- Kole Manev (born 1941)
- Darko Mitrevski (born 1971), film director and screenwriter
- Stole Popov (born 1950)
- Svetozar Ristovski (born 1972)
- Ljubomir Stefanov (born 1975)
- Apostol Trpeski (born 1948)
- Kiro Urdin (born 1945)

==== Theatre production ====
- Bill Neskovski (1964–1989), playwright and actor
- Naum Panovski (born 1950), theatre director

=== Visual arts ===
==== Architecture ====
- Slavko Brezoski (1922–2017)
- Elpida Hadži-Vasileva (born 1971)
- Janko Konstantinov (1926–2010)
- Georgi Konstantinovski (1930–2020)
- Mimoza Nestorova-Tomić (1929–2024)
- Živko Popovski (1934–2007)

==== Fashion design ====
- Risto Bimbiloski (born 1975)
- Nikola Eftimov (born 1968)
- Mila Hermanovski (born 1969), costume and fashion designer
- Toni Matičevski (born 1976)
- Marjan Pejoski (born 1968)

==== Graphic design ====
- Vlado Goreski (born 1958)
- Miroslav Grčev (born 1955), designer of the Macedonian flag

==== Models ====
- Katarina Ivanovska (born 1988)

=== Multimedia ===
- Iskra Dimitrova (born 1965)

=== Painting ===
- Dimitar Avramovski-Pandilov (1898–1963)
- Rahim Blak (born 1983)
- Angel Gavrovski (born 1942)
- Vladimir Georgievski (1942–2017)
- Maja Hill (born 1976)
- Mice Jankulovski (born 1954), painter and cartoonist
- Vangel Kodžoman (1904–1994)
- Dimitar Kondovski (1927–1993)
- Rubens Korubin (born 1949)
- Lazar Ličenoski (1901–1964)
- Petar Mazev (1927–1993)
- Isaija Mažovski (1852–1926), painter and activist
- Ordan Petlevski (1930–1997)
- Bobby Stojanov Varga (born 1972)
- Dimo Todorovski (1910–1983)
- Borislav Traikovski (1917–1996)
- Keraca Visulčeva (1911–2004)
- Tomo Vladimirski (1904–1971)

=== Product design ===
- Stefan Janoski (born 1979), skateboarder and artist
- Apostol Tnokovski (born 1982)

=== Sculpting ===
- Žarko Bašeski (born 1957)
- Petar Hadži Boškov (1928–2015)
- Elpida Hadzi-Vasileva (born 1971)
- Tome Serafimovski (1935–2016)
- Gligor Stefanov (born 1956)

== Business ==
- Kocho Angjushev (born 1969), businessman
- George Atanasoski (born 1952), founder of Microflex Inc. and MAK AM International Corporation
- John Bitove (born 1960), founder of the Toronto Raptors
- John Bitove, Sr. (1928–2015), restaurateur and philanthropist
- Marjan Bojadžiev (born 1967), CEO of the National Bank of North Macedonia, board member of Skopje Chamber of Commerce
- Valentin Ilievski (born 1968), senior vice president of southeast Europe for Messer Group, president of assembly of FK Sarajevo
- Christopher Ilitch (born 1965), president and CEO of Ilitch Holdings, Inc.
- Marian Ilitch (born 1933), owner of Detroit's MotorCity Casino
- Mike Ilitch (1929–2017), founder of Little Caesars and owner of Detroit Red Wings and Detroit Tigers
- Minčo Jordanov (born 1944), owner of multiple companies
- Petar Kajevski (born 1974), founder of Najdi!
- Jordan Kamčev (born 1970), owner of multiple companies, richest man in Macedonia as of 2015
- Katrina Markoff (born 1973), owner of multiple chocolatier companies
- Lou Naumovski (born 1957), vice president and commercial/general director of Russia for Kinross Gold
- Susan Niczowski (born 1966), CEO and founder of Summer Fresh Salads Inc.
- Chris Pavlovski, CEO and founder of Rumble
- Andy Peykoff (born 1976), owner of Niagara Bottling
- Steve Stavro (1926–2006), founder of Knob Hill Farms, owner of Toronto Maple Leafs, director of Liquor Control Board of Ontario
- Mike Zafirovski (born 1953), president and CEO of Nortel Networks and board of directors at Boeing

== Journalism ==
- Stefan Dedov (1869–1914)
- Vasko Eftov (born 1967)
- Branko Geroski
- Tomislav Kezarovski (born 1965)
- Dijamandija Mišajkov (1872–1953)
- Nikola Mladenov (1964–2013)
- Mihail Solunov (1877–1956)
- Vlado Taneski (1952–2008)
- Mirka Velinovska (born 1952)

== Literature ==
- Gjorgji Abadžiev (1910–1963)
- Petre M. Andreevski (1934–2006)
- Živko Čingo (1935–1987)
- Dimitar Dimitrov (born 1937), philosopher and diplomat
- Lidija Dimkovska (born 1971), poet
- Elena Filipovska, philologist
- Stojan Hristov (1898–1995)
- Vasil Iljoski (1902–1995)
- Slavko Janevski (1920–2000), poet, writer, and author of the first Macedonian-language novel The village behind the seven ash trees
- Mišo Juzmeski (1966–2021)
- Blaže Koneski (1921–1993)
- Risto Krle (1900–1975)
- Katica Kulavkova (born 1951)
- Vlado Maleski (1919–1984), author of the Macedonian national anthem "Today over Macedonia"
- Stefan Markovski (born 1990), screenwriter, poet, philosopher
- Mateja Matevski (1929–2018)
- Krste Misirkov (1874–1926)
- Kole Nedelkovski (1912–1941)
- Olivera Nikolova (1936–2024)
- Risto Ognjanovikj-Lonoski (1870–1941)
- Anton Panov (1906–1967)
- Sibila Petlevski (born 1964)
- Vidoe Podgorec (1934–1997)
- Aleksandar Prokopiev (born 1953)
- Kočo Racin (1908–1943), poet, communist, and author of the poetry collection White Dawns
- Atanas Razdolov (1872–1931), writer and revolutionary
- Blaže Ristovski (1931–2018), linguist, folklorist and cultural historian
- Goce Smilevski (born 1975)
- Aco Šopov (1923–1982), poet
- Sterjo Spasse (1914–1989), writer and novelist
- Milan Stoilov (1881–1903), writer and revolutionary
- Zvonko Taneski (born 1980), poet
- Jovica Tasevski-Eternijan (born 1976)
- Gane Todorovski (1929–2010)
- Nikola Vaptsarov (1909–1942), poet

== Religion ==
- Gabriel Athonite (1926–1990), Macedonian Orthodox bishop, monk, and ascetic, later canonized as a saint
- Slavko Dimevski (1920–1994), priest
- Mihail Gogov (1912–1999), fourth archbishop of Ohrid and Macedonia
- Joseph of Kumanovo and Osogovo, first and current Metropolitan bishop of the Diocese of Kumanovo and Osogovo
- David Ninov (born 1972), bishop of Dremvit and auxiliary bishop of the Ardi of Skopje of the Macedonian Orthodox Church
- Ivica Serafimovski (born 1973)
- Stefan, Archbishop of Ohrid and Macedonia (born 1955)
- Kiro Stojanov (born 1959), Roman Catholic bishop of Skopje
- Theodosius of Skopje (1846–1926), attempted to restore the Archbishopric of Ohrid as a separate Macedonian church
- Nikodim Tsarknias (born 1942), Macedonian Orthodox Christian monk

== Revolutionaries ==
- Alekso Martulkov (1878–1962)
- Rizo Rizov (1872–1950)
- Boris Sarafov (1872–1907), revolutionary
- Pavel Shatev (1882–1951), socialist revolutionary
- Smile Vojdanov (1872–1958), revolutionary and founder of the Macedonian People's League

== Sport ==
=== Athletics ===
- Kristijan Efremov (born 1990), sprinter
- Dario Ivanovski (born 1997), long distance runner
- Daniela Kuleska (born 1981), middle distance runner
- Ismail Mačev (1960–2019), sprinter
- Chris Mitrevski (born 1996), long jumper and sprinter
- Riste Pandev (born 1994), sprinter
- Elizabeta Pavlovska (born 1972), hurdler
- Hristina Risteska (born 1991), sprinter
- Ivana Rožman (born 1989), track and field
- Vančo Stojanov (born 1977), middle distance runner
- Mile Stojkoski (born 1965), long distance marathon paralympian
- Jovan Stojoski (born 1997), sprinter
- Aleksandra Vojnevska (born 1981), sprinter

=== American football ===
- Vlade Janakievski (born 1957), college football placekicker
- Paul Naumoff (1945–2018), NFL linebacker
- Pete Stoyanovich (born 1967), NFL placekicker

=== Association football ===
- Vlatko Andonovski (born 1976), US women's national team manager
- Zoran Baldovaliev (born 1983)
- Milko Djurovski (born 1963), Olympic bronze medalist
- Boško Gjurovski (born 1961)
- Mario Gjurovski (born 1985)
- Gjorgji Hristov (born 1976)
- Čedomir Janevski (born 1961)
- Marek Jankulovski (born 1977), Champions League winner
- Jovan Kirovski (born 1976), first American to win Champions League
- Dejan Kulusevski (born 2000)
- Goran Maznov (born 1981)
- Igor Mitreski (born 1979)
- George Nanchoff (born 1954)
- Louis Nanchoff (born 1956)
- Zlatko Nastevski (born 1957)
- Chris Naumoff (born 1995)
- Ilčo Naumoski (born 1983)
- Ilija Nestorovski (born 1990)
- Oka Nikolov (born 1974)
- Jane Nikolovski (born 1973)
- Darko Pančev (born 1965), Golden Boot and European Cup winner
- Goran Pandev (born 1983), Champions League winner
- Saško Pаndev (born 1987)
- Robert Petrov (born 1978)
- Goran Popov (born 1984)
- Robert Popov (born 1982)
- Stevica Ristić (born 1982)
- Goce Sedloski (born 1974)
- Dragi Setinov (born 1961)
- Goran Slavkovski (born 1989)
- Mile Sterjovski (born 1979)
- Veliče Šumulikoski (born 1981)
- Goce Toleski (born 1977)
- Vančo Trajanov (born 1978)
- Jovica Trajčev (born 1981)
- Ivan Tričkovski (born 1987)
- Aleksandar Vasoski (born 1979)

=== Australian rules football ===
- Josh Daicos (born 1998), forward
- Nick Daicos (born 2003), midfielder
- Peter Daicos (born 1961), Australian Football Hall of Fame inductee
- Nick Malceski (born 1984), 2014 All-Australian team member
- Mark Nicoski (born 1983), utility
- Paul Peos (born 1968)
- Sam Petrevski-Seton (born 1998)

=== Baseball ===
- Kevin Kouzmanoff (born 1981), MLB third baseman

=== Basketball ===
- Jelena Antić (born 1991)
- Pero Antić (born 1982), NBA player
- Gjorgji Čekovski (born 1979)
- Slavica Dimovska (born 1985)
- Todor Gečevski (born 1977)
- Blagoja Georgievski (1950–2020), Olympic silver medalist
- Vlado Ilievski (born 1980)
- Andrej Jakimovski (born 2001), NCAA player
- Petar Naumoski (born 1968), two-time EuroLeague champion
- Kiril Nikolovski (born 1988)
- Predrag Samardžiski (born 1986)
- Darko Sokolov (born 1986)
- Vrbica Stefanov (born 1973)
- Damjan Stojanovski (born 1987)
- Vojdan Stojanovski (born 1987)
- Stojna Vangelovska (born 1964), Olympic silver medalist

=== Canoeing ===
- Atanas Nikolovski (born 1980), slalom canoer
- Lazar Popovski (born 1975), whitewater kayaker
- Nenad Trpovski (born 1978), slalom canoer
- Ana Ugrinovska (born 1980), slalom canoer

=== Chess ===
- Vlatko Bogdanovski (born 1964)
- Aleksandar Colovic (born 1976)
- Zvonko Stanojoski (born 1964)

=== Cricket ===
- Len Pascoe (born 1950), Test and One Day International cricketer

=== Cycling ===
- Andrej Petrovski (born 1996)
- Stefan Petrovski (born 1991)
- Gorgi Popstefanov (born 1987)

=== Handball ===
- Stevče Aluševski (born 1972)
- Lasko Andonovski (born 1991)
- Tanja Andrejeva (born 1978)
- Petar Angelov (born 1977)
- Branislav Angelovski (born 1977)
- Filip Arsenovski (born 1998)
- Stefan Atanasovski (born 1999)
- Mirjeta Bajramoska (born 1984)
- Andrea Beleska (born 1994)
- Danilo Brestovac (born 1975)
- Biljana Crvenkoska (born 1983)
- Filip Čurlevski (born 1992)
- Jane Cvetkovski (born 1987)
- Viktor Damceski (born 1996)
- Nikola Danilovski (1997–2021)
- Zlatko Daskalovski (born 1984)
- Zorica Despodovska (born 1991)
- Darko Dimitrievski (born 1993)
- Dimitar Dimitrioski (born 1998)
- Oliver Dimitrioski (born 1972)
- Ivan Dimitrovski (born 1998)
- Vasko Dimitrovski (born 1982)
- Vancho Dimovski (born 1979)
- Ivan Djonov (born 1997)
- Stefan Drogrishki (born 1994)
- Daniel Dupjačanec (born 1983)
- David Gashoski (born 1996)
- Goce Georgievski (born 1987)
- Daniel Gjorgjeski (born 1993)
- Dushica Gjorgjievska (born 1987)
- Elena Gjeorgjievska (born 1990)
- Simona Grozdanovska (born 1988)
- Lenche Ilkova (born 1984)
- Tomislav Jagurinovski (born 1998)
- Stefan Kimevski (born 1990)
- Marko Kizikj (born 2001)
- Alen Kjosevski (born 2001)
- Dario Kofiloski (born 2000)
- Marjan Kolev (born 1977)
- Nikola Kosteski (born 1992)
- Goran Krstevski (born 1996)
- Ilija Krstevski (born 1993)
- Milorad Kukoski (born 1987)
- Filip Kuzmanovski (born 1996)
- Goran Kuzmanoski (born 1982)
- Milan Lazarevski (born 1997)
- Filip Lazarov (born 1985)
- Kiril Lazarov (born 1980), all-time Champions League top scorer
- Milan Levov (born 1987)
- Elena Livrinikj (born 1994)
- Bojan Ljubevski (born 1996)
- Bojan Madzovski (born 1994)
- Borjan Madzovski (born 1994)
- Dejan Manaskov (born 1992)
- Martin Manaskov (born 1994)
- Pepi Manaskov (born 1964)
- Nikola Markoski (born 1990)
- Andrej Markudov (born 1996)
- Robertina Mečevska (born 1984)
- Filip Mirkulovski (born 1983)
- Marko Miševski (born 1999)
- Petar Misovski (born 1976)
- Andrej Mitikj (born 2000)
- Vlatko Mitkov (born 1981)
- Nikola Mitrevski (born 1985)
- Dragica Mitrova (born 1987)
- Mihajlo Mladenovikj (born 2000)
- Nataša Mladenovska (born 1986)
- Zlatko Mojsoski (born 1981)
- Naumče Mojsovski (born 1980)
- Dijana Naumoska (born 1985)
- Vlado Nedanovski (born 1985)
- Marko Neloski (born 1996)
- Marko Ognjanovski (born 1997)
- Goce Ojleski (born 1989)
- Toše Ončev (born 1996)
- Davor Palevski (born 1997)
- Marija Papudjieva (born 1977)
- Igor Pavlovski (born 1982)
- Dragana Pecevska (born 1983)
- Antonio Peševski (born 1990)
- Žarko Peševski (born 1991)
- Dragana Petkovska (born 1996)
- Kostadin Petrov (born 1992)
- Martin Popovski (born 1994)
- Nemanja Pribak (born 1984)
- Sara Ristovska (born 1996)
- Borko Ristovski (born 1982)
- Ljubomir Savevski (born 1957)
- Jovana Sazdovska (born 1993)
- Martin Serafimov (born 2000)
- Mice Shilegov (born 1998)
- Marija Shteriova (born 1991)
- Sara Stevanoska (born 1993)
- Mitko Stoilov (born 1983)
- Stojanče Stoilov (born 1987)
- Nikola Stojčevski (born 1984)
- Zvonko Šundovski (born 1967)
- Filip Taleski (born 1996)
- Jovan Talevski (born 1994)
- Mario Tankoski (born 1998)
- Vladimir Temelkov (born 1980)
- Teodor Todeski (born 2002)
- Martin Tomovski (born 1997)
- Blagojče Trajkovski (born 1986)
- Martin Velkovski (born 1997)

=== Ice hockey ===
- Andy Andreoff (born 1991), left winger
- Mike Angelidis (born 1985), center
- Jonah Gadjovich (born 1998), left winger
- Tommy Ivan (1911–1999), three-time Stanley Cup-winning coach
- Dan Jancevski (born 1981), defenseman
- Ed Jovanovski (born 1976), defenseman
- Steve Staios (born 1973), winger/defenseman
- Steven Stamkos (born 1990), two-time Stanley Cup-winning, seven-time all-star center
- Alek Stojanov (born 1973), right winger
- Brandon Tanev (born 1991), left winger
- Christopher Tanev (born 1989), defenseman
- José Théodore (born 1976), goalie, Vezina and Hart Trophy winner
- Michael Zigomanis (born 1981), center

=== Martial arts ===
- Alen Amedovski (born 1988), mixed martial artist
- Pete George (1929–2021), weightlifter, Olympic gold medalist
- Dejan Georgievski (born 1999), taekwondo Olympic silver medalist
- Puleksenija Jovanoska (born 1993), karateka
- Katerina Nikoloska (born 1990), judoka
- Nina Nunes (born 1985), UFC flyweight fighter
- Beni Osmanoski (born 1988), kickboxer
- Emil Pavlov (born 1992), karateka
- Ace Rusevski (born 1956), Olympic bronze medalist boxer
- Vlatko Sokolov (born 1973), wrestler
- Daniel Stefanovski (born 1996), kickboxer
- Alexander Volkanovski (born 1988), UFC Featherweight champion, reached #1 in pound-for-pound rankings

=== Mountain climbing ===
- Dimitar Ilievski-Murato (1953–1989), alpinist, first Macedonian to climb Everest
- Saško Kedev (born 1962), doctor, politician and third Macedonian to climb Everest. The oldest person in the world who have climbed seven summits, and all of the 14 summits above 8000 meters, recognised by Guinness World Records with these two world-record achievements
- Borče Jovčevski , alpinist
- Slobodan Jovanoski, alpinist
- Jovan Poposki, alpinist

=== Racing ===
- Igor Stefanovski (born 1982), two-time European Hill Climb champion

=== Rugby league ===
- Paul Momirovski (born 1996), centre and winger

=== Shooting ===
- Nina Balaban (born 1995)
- Olivera Nakovska-Bikova (born 1974)
- Darko Naseski (born 1979)
- Sašo Nestorov (born 1987)

=== Skiing ===
- Darko Damjanovski (born 1981), biathlete and cross-country skier
- Gjoko Dineski (born 1972), cross-country skier
- Ivana Ivchevska (born 1988), alpine skier
- Stavre Jada (born 1998), cross-country skier
- Rosana Kiroska (born 1991), cross-country skier
- Marija Kolaroska (born 1997), cross-country skier
- Gjorgi Markovski (born 1986), alpine skier
- Jana Nikolovska (born 1979), alpine skier
- Dejan Panovski (born 1980), alpine skier
- Antonio Ristevski (born 1989), alpine skier
- Aleksandar Stojanovski (born 1979), alpine skier
- Viktorija Todorovska (born 2000), cross-country skier

=== Swimming ===
- Marko Blaževski (born 1992)
- Anastasia Bogdanovski (born 1993)
- Mirjana Boševska (born 1981)
- Biljana Coković (1982–2007)
- Filip Derkoski (born 2000)
- Mia Blaževska Eminova (born 2005)
- Kire Filipovski (born 1973)
- Nikola Ǵuretanoviḱ (born 2007)
- Zoran Lazarovski (born 1980)
- Aleksandar Malenko (born 1979)
- Simona Marinova (born 1994)
- Nataša Meškovska (born 1972)
- Aleksandar Miladinovski (born 1979)
- Niko Nestor (1934–2016)
- Eva Petrovska (born 2004)
- Elena Popovska (born 1990)
- Mihajlo Ristovski (born 1983)
- Tomi Stefanovski
- Vesna Stojanovska (born 1985)

=== Tennis ===
- Lina Gjorcheska (born 1994), highest-ranked Macedonian player to date
- Kalin Ivanovski (born 2004)
- Tomislav Jotovski (born 1990)
- Aleksandar Kitinov (born 1971)
- Marina Lazarovska (born 1978)
- Lazar Magdinčev (born 1980)
- Ellen Perez (born 1995)
- Predrag Rusevski (born 1983)
- Beti Sekulovski (born 1983)

=== Volleyball ===
- Vladimir Bogoevski (born 1953)
- Gjorgi Gjorgiev (born 1992)
- Nikola Gjorgiev (born 1988)

== Politicians ==
- Metodija Andonov - Čento (1902–1957), first president of the Anti-fascist Assembly for the National Liberation of Macedonia's presidium
- Stojan Andov (1935–2024), first president of the Assembly of the Republic of Macedonia
- Strašo Angelovski (born 1959)
- Ljupčo Arsov (1910–1986)
- Dimitar Blagoev (1856–1924), founder of the Bulgarian Social Democratic Party (1891)
- Ljube Boškoski (born 1960)
- Vlado Bučkovski (born 1962)
- Paul Christie (born 1952), Toronto politician
- Branko Crvenkovski (born 1962)
- Jimmy Dimos (born 1938), politician, former speaker of the Louisiana House
- Ljubčo Georgievski (born 1966), founder of the political party VMRO-DPMNE
- Kiro Gligorov (1917–2012), first president of the Republic of Macedonia
- Vladimir Gligorov (1945–2022), economist, political analyst and liberal public intellectual
- Tim Goeglein (born 1964), deputy director of Public Liaison, Office of Public Liaison, Executive Office of the President under George W. Bush
- Nikola Gruevski (born 1970), former politician who served as prime minister of Macedonia from 2006 to 2016
- Denise Ilitch (born 1955), businesswoman, lawyer, and member of the Board of Regents of the University of Michigan
- Gjorge Ivanov (born 1960), academic and politician; president of (North) Macedonia 2009–2019
- Gordana Jankuloska (born 1975), interior minister of the Government of Macedonia
- Zoran Jolevski (born 1959), Macedonian minister of defense, ambassador to the United States
- Nikola Kljusev (1927–2008), first prime minister of Macedonia
- Lazar Koliševski (1914–2000), political leader in the Socialist Republic of Macedonia and briefly in the Socialist Federal Republic of Yugoslavia
- Trifun Kostovski (born 1946), former mayor of Skopje
- Dimitar Kovačevski (born 1974), former prime minister of North Macedonia
- Hristijan Mickoski (born 1977), VMRO-DPMNE leader and prime minister of North Macedonia
- Ilinka Mitreva (1950–2022), minister of Foreign Affairs and represented Macedonia in the council of Europe
- Lazar Mojsov (1920–2011), 34th president of the United Nations General Assembly
- Milan Pančevski (1935–2019), high-ranking communist official and the last president of the League of Communists of Yugoslavia
- Stevo Pendarovski (born 1963), former president of North Macedonia
- Tito Petkovski (born 1945)
- Nikola Poposki (born 1977), Macedonian minister of Foreign Affairs
- Radmila Šekerinska (born 1972), deputy secretary general of NATO 2024–present
- Metodi Shatorov (1897–1944), one of the founders of IMRO (United) and temporary leader of the Regional Committee of Communists in Macedonia
- Zoran Stavreski (born 1964), deputy prime minister of Macedonia
- Liliane Tanguy (born 1967), member of the French National Assembly
- Borko Temelkovski (1919–2001)
- Lui Temelkovski (born 1954), member of Canadian Parliament
- Boris Trajkovski (1956–2004)
- Vasil Tupurkovski (born 1951)
- Dimitar Vlahov (1878–1953)
- Pavlos Voskopoulos (born 1964), politician and member of the Rainbow Party
- Zoran Zaev (born 1974), prime minister of (North) Macedonia

== Partisans ==
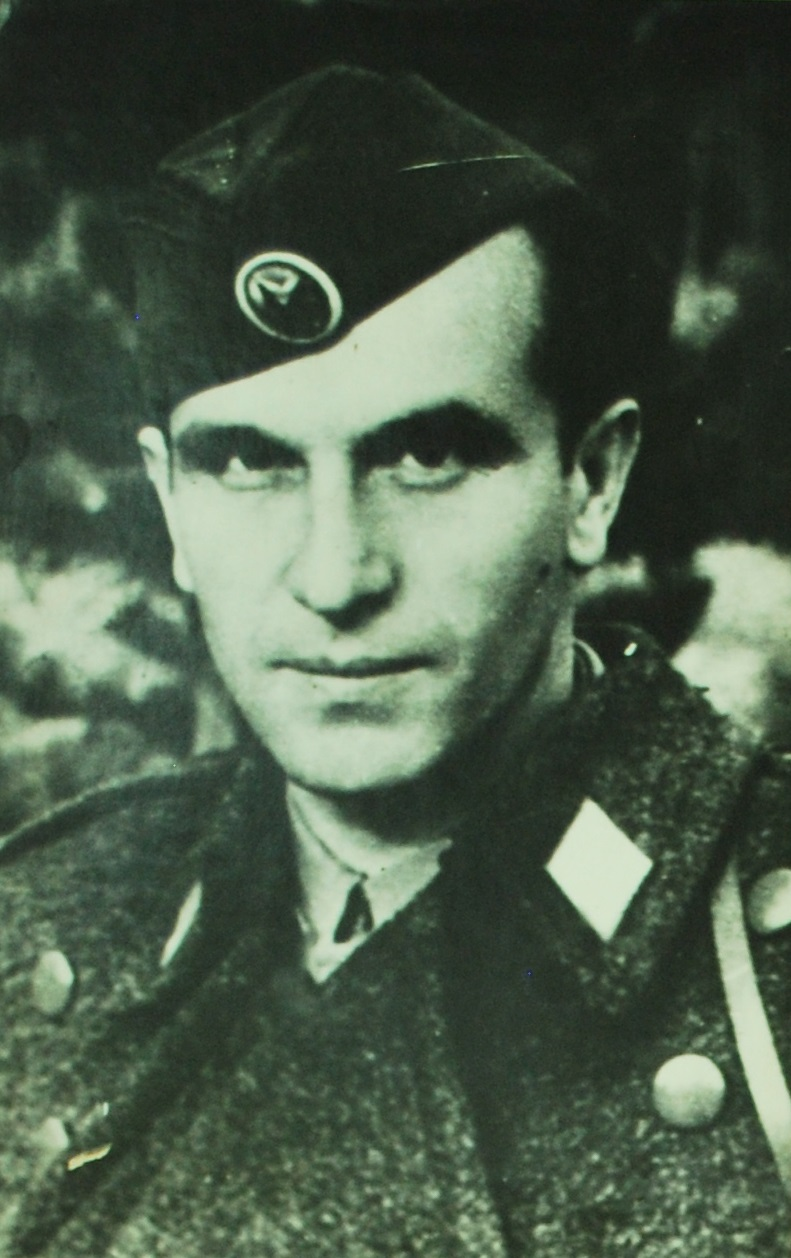
Mihailo Apostolski

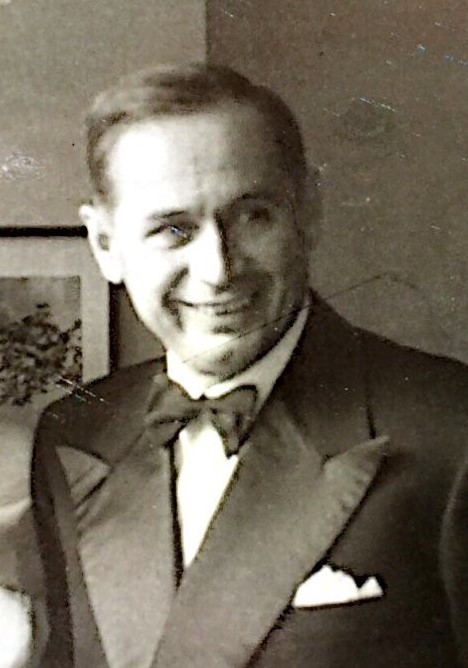
Petar Zdravkovski

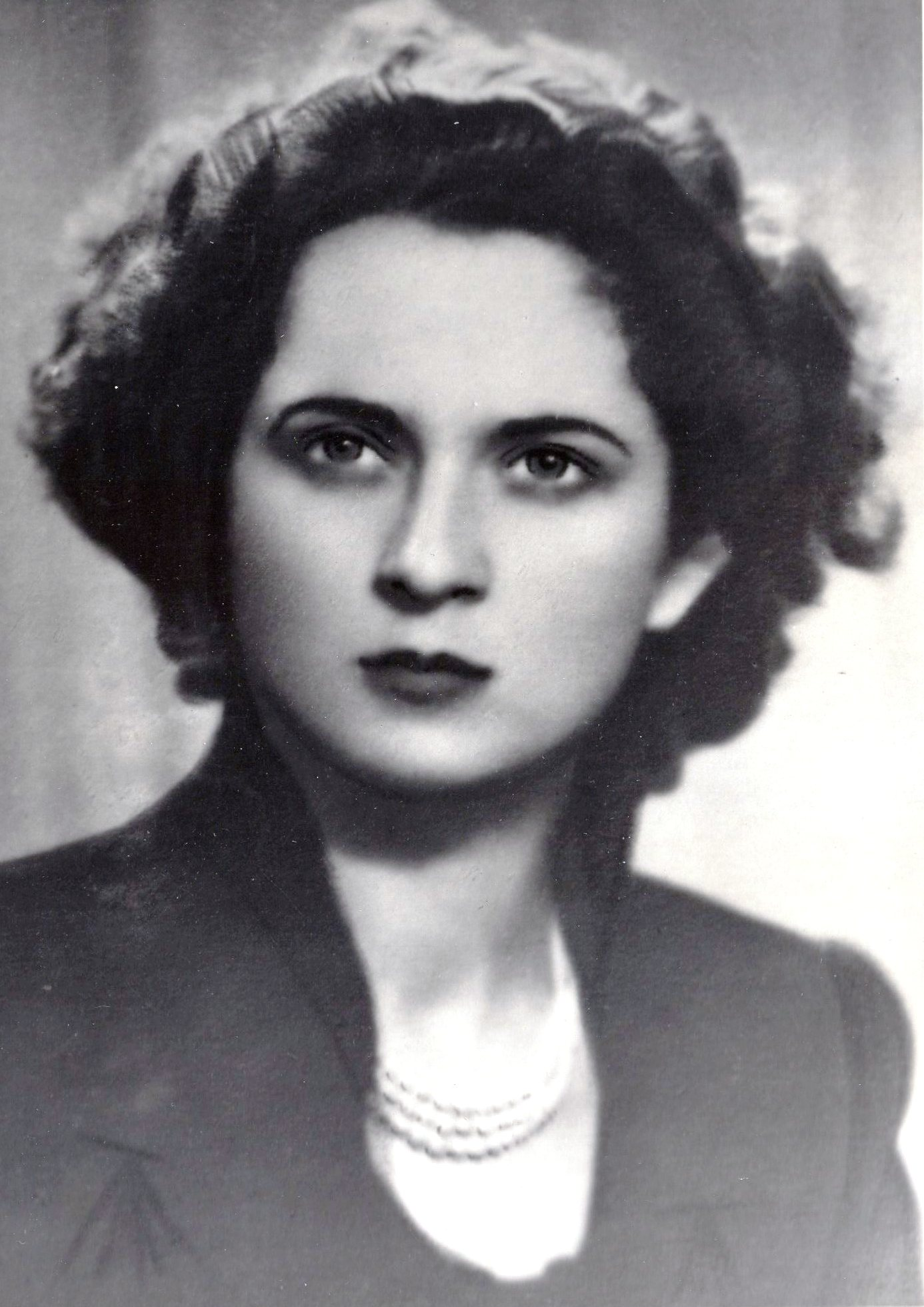
Fana Kočovska

- Mirče Acev (1915–1943), organiser of the Yugoslav communist resistance in Vardar Macedonia
- Vera Aceva (1919–2006), partisan and national hero of Socialist Federal Republic of Yugoslavia
- Vangel Ajanovski-Oče (1909–1996)
- Mihajlo Apostolski, commander of the General Staff of the National Liberation Army and Partisan Detachments of Macedonia (1906–1987)
- Jordan Cekov (1921–2019), partisan and commander of the Third Macedonian Assault Brigade
- Emanuel Čučkov (1901–1967), partisan
- Čede Filipovski Dame (1923–1945), partisan and a People's Hero of Yugoslavia
- Nevena Georgieva (1925–1942), partisan
- Mirka Ginova (1916–1946), partisan and teacher
- Kuzman Josifovski - Pitu (1915–1944), partisan and one of the organizers of the Peoples's Liberation Struggle in Macedonia who was declared a People's Hero of Yugoslavia
- Risto Kirjazovski (1927–2002), partisan in the NOF
- Fana Kočovska (1927–2004), partisan and was the youngest-named National Hero of Yugoslavia
- Vlado Makelarski (1919–1993), partisan
- Veselinka Malinska (1917–1987), partisan and prominent member of the Women's Antifascist Front of Macedonia
- Dimče Mirčev (1913–1944), partisan and awarded the Order of the people’s hero of Yugoslavia
- Paskal Mitrevski (1912–1978), partisan, leader of National Liberation Front and minister in the Provisional Democratic Government
- Blagoj Jankov Mučeto (1911–1944), partisan and declared a People's Hero of Yugoslavia
- Mara Naceva (1920–2013), partisan and president of the board of the Women's Antifascist Front of Macedonia
- Stefan Naumov (1920–1942), partisan and People's Hero of Yugoslavia
- Јordan Nikolov (1916–1942), partisan
- Orce Nikolov (1916–1942), partisan
- Katerina Nurdzhieva (1922–2018), Macedonian partisan and national activist
- Strašo Pindžur (1915–1943), partisan and a national hero of SFR Yugoslavia
- Vančo Prke (1921–1943)
- Blagoj Stračkov (1920–1943), partisan and a Macedonian national hero
- Hristijan Todorovski Karpoš (1921–1944), partisan and commander of the "Jordan Nikolov" battalion
- Andreas Tsipas (1904–1956), leader of the Greek Communist Party during the Second World War
- Gjorgi Dimitrovski Vikentiev (1920–1944), partisan and commander of the 4th Macedonian brigade
- Petar Zdravkovski (1912–1967), Macedonian partisan and awarded the Legion of Honour

== Television ==
- Bojan Jovanovski, television personality
- Ziya Tong (born 1980), television producer, TV host
