= Krstevski =

Krstevski (Macedonian: Крстевски) or Krsteski is a common Macedonian surname. Notable people with the surname include:

- Bojan Krstevski (born 1989), Macedonian basketball player
- Darko Krsteski (born 1971), Macedonian footballer
- Goran Krstevski (born 1996), Macedonian handball player
- Ilija Krstevski (born 1993), Macedonian handball player
