= Tufegdžić =

Tufegdžić is a surname. Notable people with the surname include:

- Ivana Tufegdžić (born 1993), Macedonian politician
- Goran Tufegdžić (born 1971), Serbian footballer
- Lazar Tufegdžić (born 1997), Serbian footballer
- Srdjan Tufegdzic (born 1980), Serbian footballer
- Vladimir Tufegdžić (born 1991), Serbian footballer
