= Ivana Tufegdžić =

Politician from Macedonia

Ivana Tufegdžić (born 11 February 1993) is a Macedonian politician who serves as a Member of Parliament in the Assembly of North Macedonia.

== Biography ==
Born in Skopje on 11 February 1993, Tufegdžić graduated from Gimnazija "Orce Nikolov" in Skopje before enrolling at University of Skopje's Faculty of Law, where she graduated with a degree in political science. As a student at the University of Skopje, Tufegdžić served on the Student Council, negotiating with Ministry of Education officials around a new higher education law. During the Colorful Revolution Tufegdžić, with her colleague Pavle Bogoevski, organized several protests against the government.

In the 2016 Macedonian parliamentary election, Tufegdžić was elected as a member of the Social Democratic Union of Macedonia in the First Constituency, where the party won ten seats.

In Parliament, Tufegdžić has been active on youth-related issues, specifically around youth emigration from North Macedonia.
