= Archaeology of North Macedonia =

Archaeology of North Macedonia is the field of archaeology in the country. It was documented in the broader region for the first time in the 19th century. Before the establishment of a Macedonian state, it was part of the Serbian framework. The establishment of a national archaeology permitted the creation of local institutions and the involvement of local scholars.

== History ==
=== 19th century–20th century ===
Western travelers documented archaeological activities in region of Macedonia in the 19th century. In this period, notable works about antiquities were published, such as Antiquarian Researches in Illyricum I-IV (1883–1885) by Arthur Evans, Arhaia geografia the Makedoniae (1874) and Makedonia en lithois fthengomenois kai mnemeiois sozomenois (1896) by Margaritus Dimitsa. During World War I, Bulgarian archaeologist Bogdan Filov and Czech archaeologist Karel Škorpil, excavated the necropolis at Trebeništa and discovered two golden masks in royal graves in 1918. After the annexation of Vardar Macedonia by the Kingdom of Yugoslavia in the same year, there was an increase in archaeological activities. Between 1924 and 1936, the National Museum in Belgrade had organised a large field project (led by Vladimir Petković, Balduin Saria and Đorđe Mano-Zisi, and Rudolf Egger from Vienna) at the site of Stobi, a large ancient city. The team found evidence of Roman infrastructure there, as well as early Christian churches. At the time, it was one of the biggest projects in present-day North Macedonia in the interwar period and also one of the biggest projects of Serbian archaeology, which was also noticed by foreign scholars. The first archaeological institutions appeared in the 1920s, such as Historical Archaeological Museum, the Faculty of Philosophy, and the Skopje Scientific Society, all of whom were part of the kingdom's program to develop what they considered as Southern Serbian regions. Archaeologists in the territory of present-day North Macedonia were then from Belgrade or from other Yugoslav cities such as Sarajevo and Zagreb. Archaeology then was part of the Serbian framework. Another site that was researched was Heraclea Lyncestis in Bitola in present-day southern North Macedonia. The first excavations on the site were made in the early 1930s, while more systematic research followed from the mid to late 1930s.

=== 20th century–21st century ===
After World War II, Vardar Macedonia became a state of SFR Yugoslavia. In this period, a national archaeology was established, with local institutions and scholars. Most of the first generations of Macedonian archaeologists studied in the University of Belgrade. There was focus on medieval (Byzantine and Slavic) archaeology as a basis for developing the field, due to the support of the Macedonian nation-building process by the Communist Party of Yugoslavia and the Yugoslav Macedonian government. After the 1963 Skopje earthquake, the buildings of the Archaeological Museum and the Faculty of Philosophy were reconstructed. Archaeological curriculum was introduced for the first time in the University of Skopje's Faculty of Philosophy (established 1946) in the academic year 1974/1975. The Archaeological Society of Macedonia was founded in 1975 in Skopje as a non-governmental organisation, as part of the Archaeological Society of Yugoslavia.

The Republic of Macedonia, now North Macedonia, became independent during the breakup of Yugoslavia in the 1990s. During that period, the communication between Macedonian archaeologists and other archaeologists was limited due to visa regime restrictions imposed on Macedonia by the EU, as well as poverty, however they were able to re-establish ties with other archaeologists. The discipline was influential during the dispute between Macedonia and Greece over the ancestry of Alexander the Great and ancient Macedonians. In the country, the field has often been placed at the service of the state, and used to legitimise nationalist claims to history, culture, and territory. In 2009, a burial tomb containing golden burial equipment from the 5th century BCE, was discovered in Ohrid. Around 80 artefacts were found during an excavation of an archaic necropolis from the 6th century BCE at the Rasnica site in the village Korošišta in 2024.

Most of the land of the ancient Paeonians was in the Vardar river basin, roughly in what is today North Macedonia.

== Archaeologists ==
- Blaga Aleksova
- Pasko Kuzman
- Fanula Papazoglu
- Ivan Mikulčić

== See also ==
- Bylazora
- Scupi
- Historiography in North Macedonia
- History of North Macedonia
- Ruins in North Macedonia
