= Nevena Georgieva =

Macedonian partisan fighter

Nevena Georgieva-Dunja
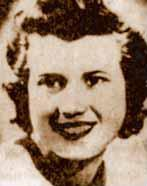
- Born: 25 August, 1925; Skopje, Kingdom of Yugoslavia
- Died: 16 December, 1942; Nežilovo, Čaška, Kingdom of Bulgaria
- Years active: 1941-1942

Nevena Georgieva-Dunja (Macedonian: Невена Георгиева-Дуња, 25 August, 1925 – 16 December, 1942) was a Macedonian Yugoslav Partisan. She participated in the 1941 Yugoslav communist resistance during World War II. At the age of 16 she was the youngest fighter in the Macedonian partisan units, and she was the first woman to be a Macedonian partisan fighter.

== Life ==
Georgieva was born on 25 July, 1925 in Skopje, in the Kingdom of Yugoslavia. She became a fighter in the Skopje Partisan Detachment when it was created on 22 August, 1941. After the reorganization of the detachment in November 1941, she went to Veles, and then to Strumica, where she helped form the Strumica Partisan Detachment in the summer of 1942. She was sentenced in absentia to 7 years in prison by the occupying powers in May 1942. In September of 1942, she became a fighter in the Veles Partisan Detachment that was named after the politician Dimitar Vlahov.

Georgieva was killed on 16 December, 1942 in Nežilovo, Čaška, during the World War II in Yugoslav Macedonia by a local anti-guerrilla detachment, while covering the escape of her adult comrades in the guerrilla squad. Her head was cut off and paraded through the villages and the city of Veles by the local anti-guerrilla chetniks to cause fear amongst the population.

== Legacy ==
Georgieva is widely considered a national hero of North Macedonia. Georgieva is featured as a heroine in multiple Macedonian newly composed folk songs, notably По поле одат аргати and Пуста останала таја контра чета. She is also the namesake of two elementary schools, Kisela Voda and Nejilovo, as well as one of the student dormitories in Skopje. There are also a number of statues of Nevena Georgieva, including busts in Kisela Voda and in Skopje. A memorial plaque was installed in the Women Fighters Park in Skopje, and another in Nejilovo was unveiled in 2013.

== Gallery ==
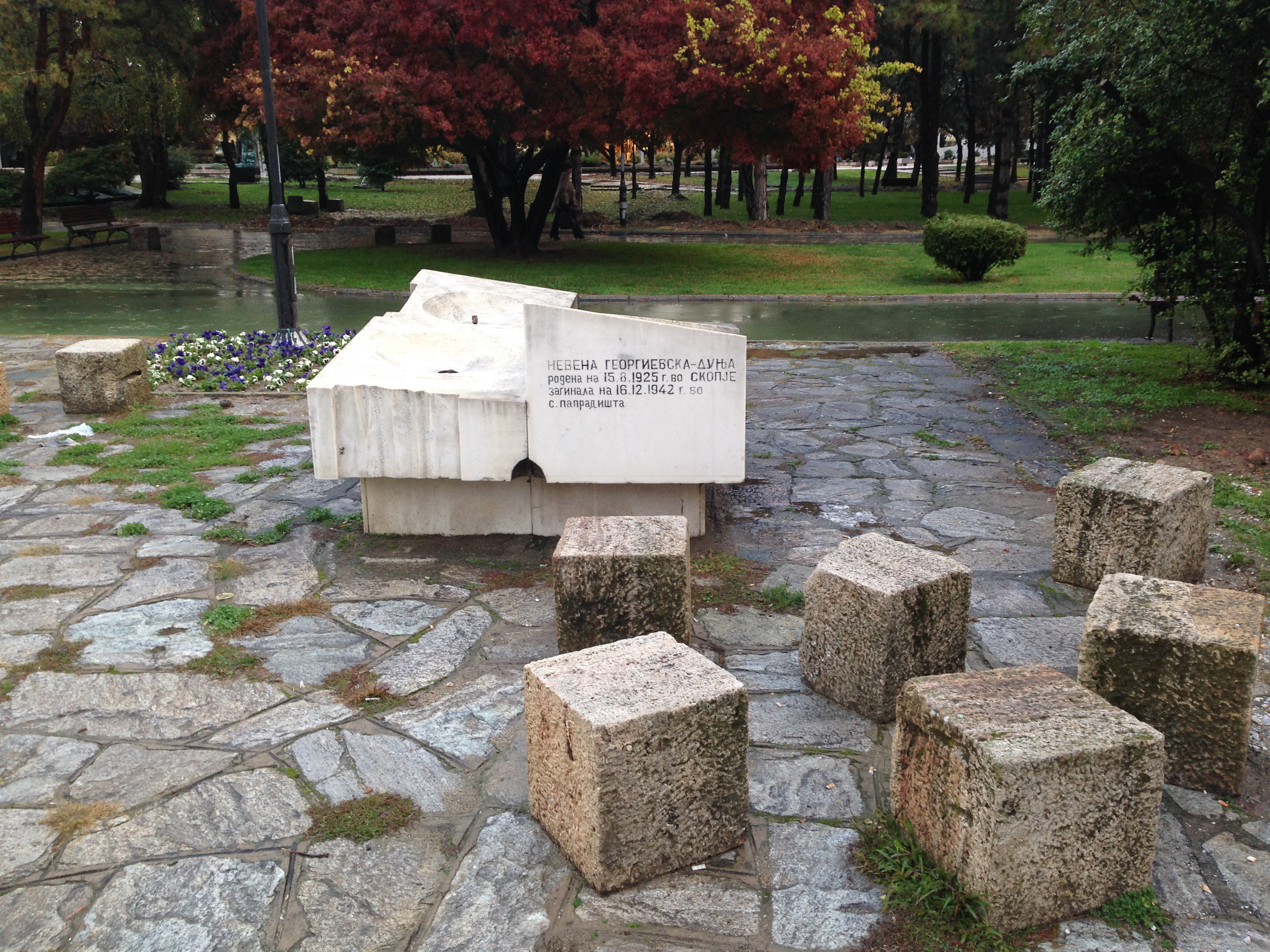

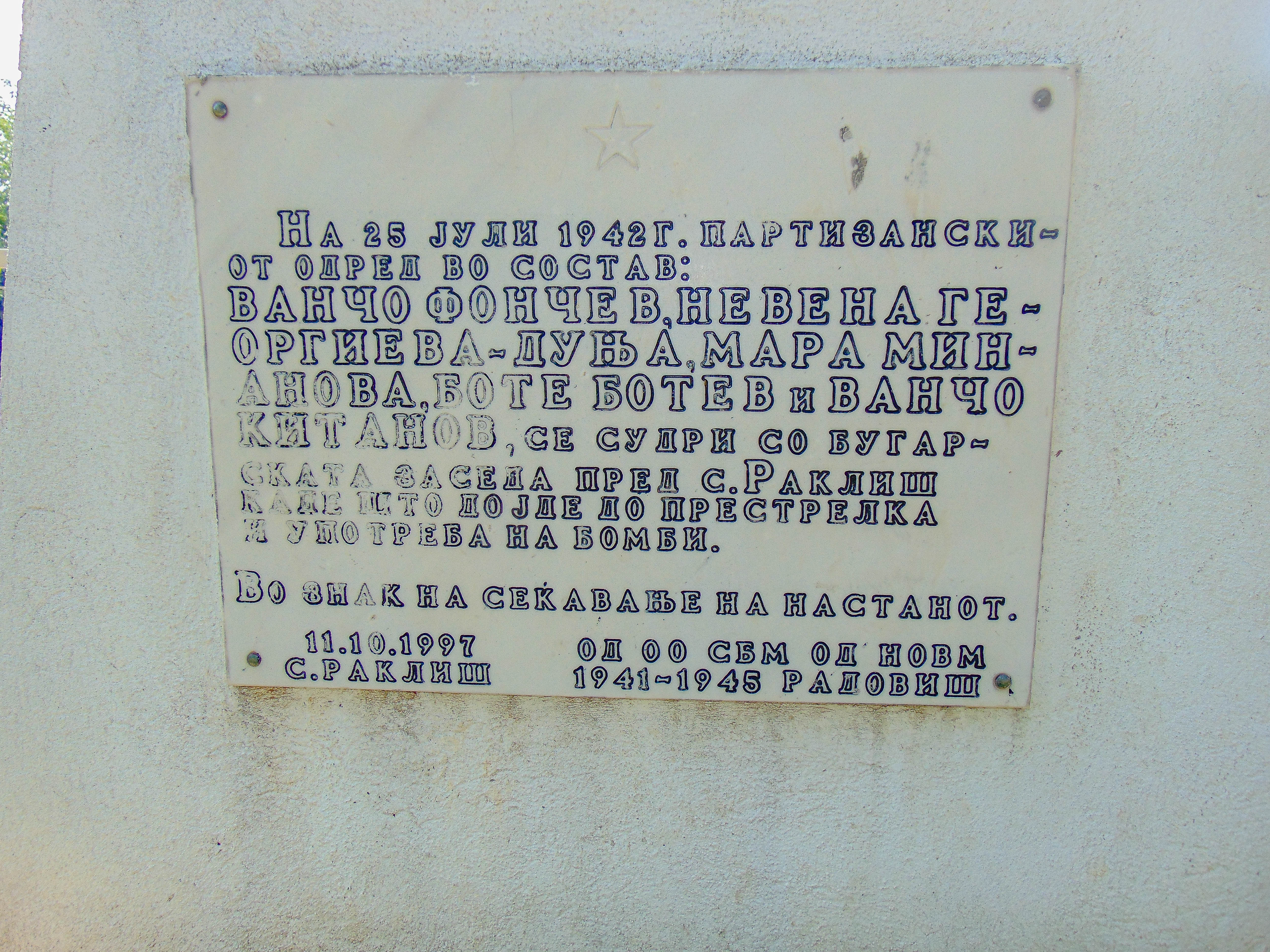

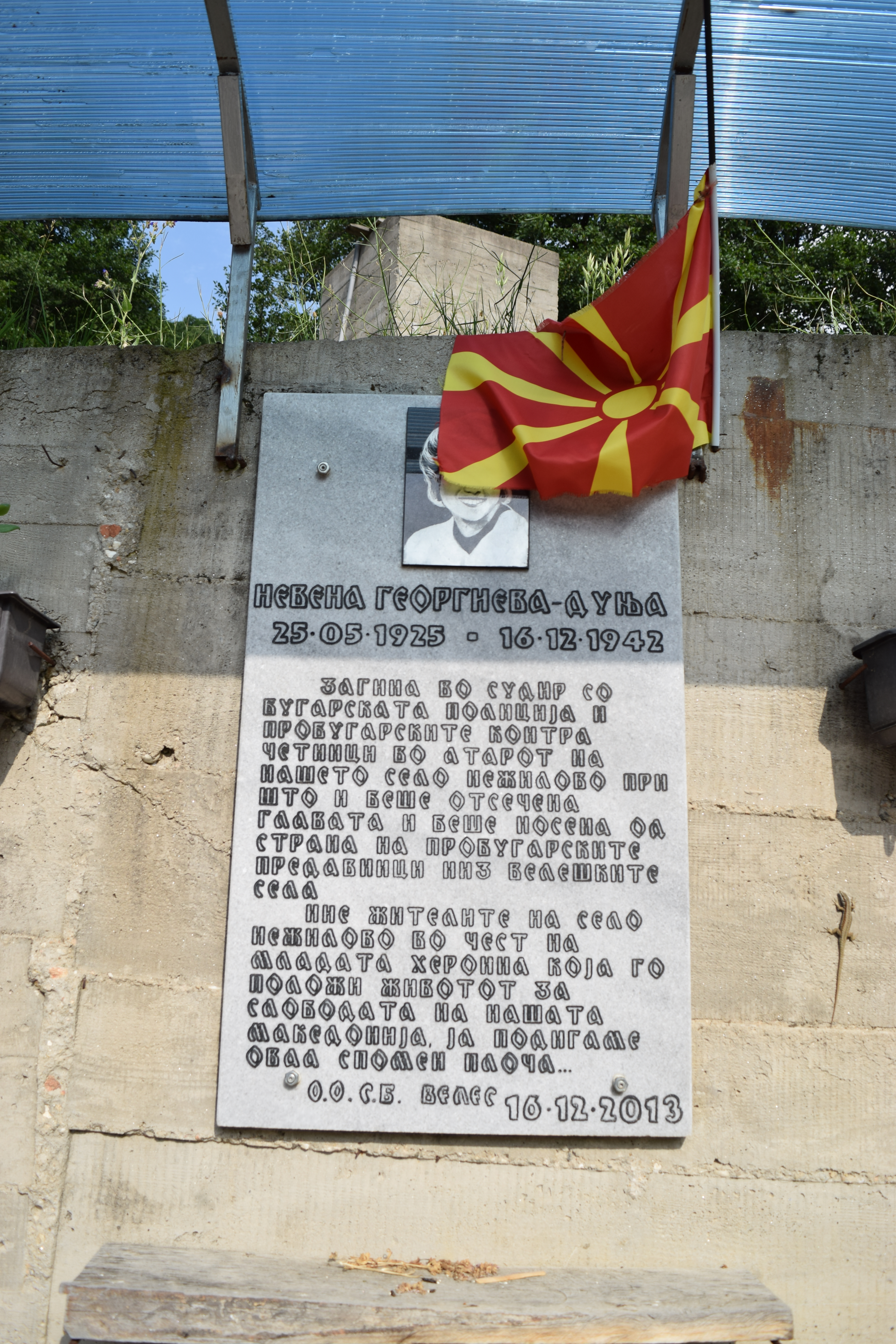
