= Antonio Peševski =

Macedonian handball player

Antonijo Peševski
Personal information
- Nationality: Macedonian
- Born: 23 December 1990 (age 35) Skopje, SR Macedonia, Yugoslavia
- Height: 2.09 m (6 ft 10 in)

Sport
- Sport: Handball
- Position: Goalkeeper
- Current club: (North Macedonia) RK Metalurg Skopje
- Number: 31

Senior clubs
- Years: Team
- 2012-2013: (North Macedonia) RK Dračevo
- 2013-2017: (North Macedonia) RK Metalurg Skopje

Antonijo Peševski (Macedonian: Антонијо Пешевски; born 23 December 1990) is a Macedonian handball player who played for RK Metalurg Skopje.
