= Dario Kofiloski =

Macedonian handball player

Dario Kofilovski
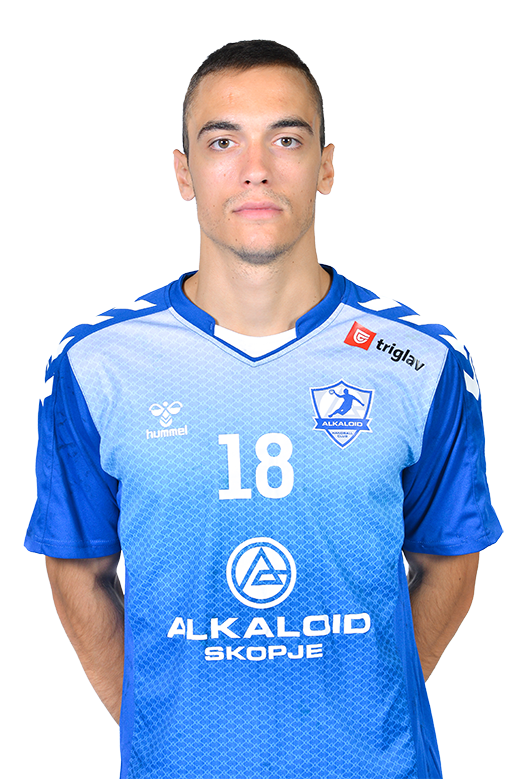

Personal information
- Nationality: Macedonian
- Born: 18 May 2000 (age 26) Skopje, Macedonia
- Height: 1.81 m (5 ft 11 in)

Sport
- Sport: Handball
- Position: Left Wing
- Current club: RK Alkaloid
- Number: 07

Youth career
- Years: Team
- –: Metalurg 2

Senior clubs
- Years: Team
- 2016–2019: Metalurg 2
- 2019–: RK Metalurg Skopje
- 2023–: RK Alkaloid
National team
- Years: Team
- –: Macedonia

Dario Kofilovski (born 18 May 2000) is a Macedonian handball player for RK Alkaloid Skopje. His position is Left wing and he was considered as the future of the HC Metalurg .rkmetalurg.mk/igraci/dario-kofilovski/ In the season 2023 he moved to HC Alkaloid.
