= Tomislav Kezarovski =

Macedonian journalist (born 1965)

- Born: 1965 (age 60–61); Veles, Yugoslavia (today Macedonia)
- Occupation: journalist

Tomislav Kezarovski (Macedonian: Томислав Kежаровски, born 1965) is a Macedonian journalist. He was jailed for allegedly revealing the identity of a protected witness in an article published in 2008 in the magazine Reporter 92. He was employed at the Skopje-based daily newspaper Nova Makedonija. His imprisonment drew harsh reactions from international non-governmental organizations and media requesting Macedonian courts to drop charges and release him.

== Charges and imprisonment ==
Kezarovski was arrested in May 2013 on the charge that he revealed the identity of a protected witness. The charge relates to an article about a 2005 murder in the village of Oreše, published in 2008 in the magazine Reporter 92 in which Kezarovski quoted from an internal police report that had been leaked to him. Kezarovski's article allegedly revealed the identity of a protected witness, who later admitted to having testified against the defendants under duress. The defendants were found not guilty, and the government alleges that Kezarovski's report influenced the jury.

The witness had however not yet been given protection at the time the article was written and in 2013 admitted having given a false statement under pressure from the police. Kezarovski believes the real reason for his arrest was to make him reveal the identity of the person who leaked him the police report. At the time of his well-publicized arrest by special police forces, Kezarovski was also investigating the death of Nikola Mladenov, the publisher of independent Macedonian newspaper Fokus, who had been killed in a mysterious car accident about two months earlier.

Kezarovski was sentenced in October 2013 to four and a half years in prison. He pleaded not guilty and has appealed the conviction. To protest his nearly two-month imprisonment, a family member stated Kezarovski began a hunger strike in his cell in Skopje's Shutka prison. Following international protests he has been transferred to house arrest. He returned home to his family on 1 November 2013 after 172 days in detention. The Skopje Court of Appeal confirmed the sentence for Kezarovski on 16 January 2015 and reduced it to two years. Considering the jail time and house arrest he had served, he was still to serve three and a half months. On 16 January the police took him from his home by police and put back in prison. Kezarovski was temporarily released on 20 January for health issues, and joined about 2,000 supporters demonstrating outside the appeals court to demand more press freedom. By Kezarovski's own account, the health issues were a mere pretext for his release, because the inner and international reactions about his case had the effect to amplify the resistance against the political situation in Macedonia. Since his release he and his wife could not find a job to earn their livelihood. At the time, as Kezarovski has said in an interview in October 2015, it is at the current situation for them impossible to find work in Macedonia.

== International reactions ==
Macedonian journalists demonstrated against the decision in front of the Court Appeals on 16 January. The South East Europe Media Organisation (SEEMO), an affiliate of the International Press Institute (IPI), expressed alarm over Kezarovski's continued imprisonment. SEEMO Secretary General Oliver Vujovic stated: "He was doing his job as journalist, but now he is being treated as a criminal. Journalists must be able to carry out investigations in the public interest free from the threat of imprisonment."

Reporters Without Borders and the Civil Center for Freedom condemned the sentence. The executive director of Reporters Without Borders Germany Christian Mihr said: "This absurd verdict is unworthy of an EU candidate and has to be overturned as quickly as possible ... Tomislav Kezarovski should not have served a single day in confinement. His only wrongdoing was to have pointed to shortcomings by Macedonia's government and judiciary through his journalistic investigations." Civil Centre for Freedom president Xhabir Deralla added: "Such an unprecedented trial harming people's lives, human rights and the basic principles of democracy has not been witnessed in Europe in a long time. This trial and the verdict against journalist Tomislav Kezarovski are flagrant evidence of an utterly politicised judiciary."

An interim European Union report published October 2014 on Macedonia as an accession candidate criticizes the media situation there, including the misuse of defamation laws and the fact that state institutions place almost no advertising in independent news media. It does not however mention individual cases such as that of Kezarovski. The opposition Social Democratic Union of Macedonia (SDSM) and media freedom groups demanded that Kezarovski be given a conditional release from prison. Some deputies of opposition parties said the ruling VMRO-DPMNE party had political motivations in jailing Kezarovski to pressure critics in the press into silence. Another legislator of that party dismissed the notion, saying that the judiciary is independent from the government. The European Federation of Journalists (EFJ) called for authorities in Macedonia to drop all charges against Tomislav Kezarovski.
