= Andrej Mitikj =

Macedonian handball player

Personal information
- Nationality: Macedonian (North Macedonia)
- Born: 14 May 2000 (age 26) Skopje, Macedonia (now North Macedonia)
- Height: 1.95 m (6 ft 5 in)

Sport
- Sport: Handball
- Position: Pivot
- Current club: RK Metalurg Skopje
- Number: 28

Youth career
- Years: Team
- –: Metalurg 2

Senior clubs
- Years: Team
- 2017–2020: Metalurg 2
- 2020–: RK Metalurg Skopje
National team
- Years: Team
- –: Macedonia

Andrej Mitikj is a Macedonian handball player that plays for RK Metalurg Skopje. He just got promoted from Metlurg's B team to RK Metalurg Skopje. His position is Pivot and he is considered as the future of the HC Metalurg .
