= Robert Veljanovski =

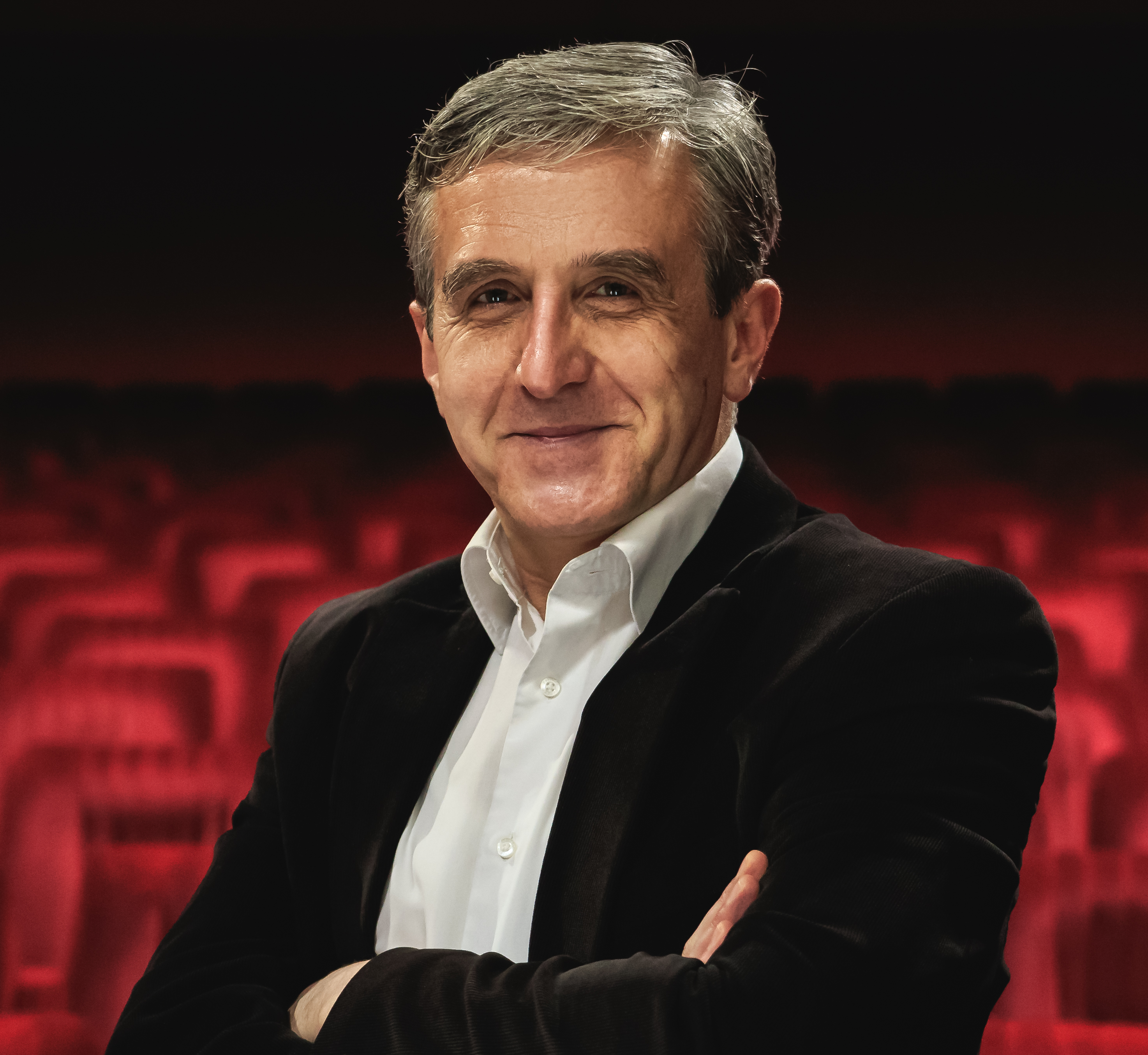
Robert Veljanovski in 2016

Robert Veljanovski (born 5 February 1968 in Skopje, SFR Yugoslavia) is a Macedonian actor and former Director of the Drama Theatre in Skopje, Macedonia.

== Biography ==
He graduated from the Faculty of Dramatic Arts at Ss. Cyril and Methodius University of Skopje and has been working at the Drama Theatre since 1997. Veljanovski has played various roles in theatre, films, television and radio projects. He has also performed in advertisements.

== Roles ==
=== Theatre ===
The following is a list of selected roles played by Veljanovski:

Year	Production	Role	Venue
1993	Life is a Dream	Servant	Drama Theatre of Skopje
1995	Arsenic and Old Lace	Mortimer Brewster	Drama Theatre of Skopje
1995	The Government Inspector	Abdulin	Drama Theatre of Skopje
1996	The Beggar's Opera	Filch	Drama Theatre of Skopje
1996	The Dresser	Oxenby	Drama Theatre of Skopje
1997	Oedipus at Colonus	Creon	Drama Theatre of Skopje
1997	The Playboy of the Western World	Philly Cullen	Drama Theatre of Skopje
1997	The Lover	Philip Glass	Drama Theatre of Skopje
1998	La Ronde	The Young Gentleman and The Husband	National Theatre of Veles
1999	Harlequin Servant of two Masters	Dr. Lombardi and Brighella	Drama Theatre of Skopje
1999	Platonov	Sergei Pavlovich Voynitsev	Drama Theatre of Skopje
1999	The Ancient Odours	Jean-Marc	Drama Theatre of Skopje
2000	Mephisto	Klaus Mann and Sebastian	Drama Theatre of Skopje
2001	Endgame	Clov	Skopje Summer Festival
2001	The False Bottom	Jakov	National Theatre of Veles
2002	Woyzeck	Andres	Drama Theatre of Skopje
2003	Cat on a Hot Tin Roof	Doctor Baugh	Drama Theatre of Skopje
2004	Three Sisters	Tusenbach	Drama Theatre of Skopje

=== Filmography ===
Year	Title	Role	Notes
1992	Eureka		TV Serija
1993	Svetlo sivo	Komardzija	TV Film
1994	Son predizvikan od letot na edna kalinka, pred da se razbudi		TV Film
1994	Prekaleni	Avram	TV Serija
1994	Bumbari	Laki	TV Serija
1995	Angeli na otpad	Ivan Mladiot	TV Film
1999	Glusecot		TV Film
2001	Zavedeni		TV Serija
2002	Gluzd vo vremeto		TV Film
2002	Vampirdžija	Fidan	TV Film
2002	Kraj na igrata	Klou	TV Film
2003	Volci	Mahi	TV Film
2003	Makedonski narodni prikazni		TV Serija
2007	Tragaci po vampiri		TV Film
2010	Pilot		TV Serija
2012	Covekot so cudna navika da me udira so cador po glava		TV Film
2014	Tvrdokorni	Vanco Mihajlov	TV Serija
2015	Zbor	Kopacot	TV Film
2016	Operacija dijamant	Taksist	TV Serija
2018	Ruganje so Hristos	Jordancho	TV Film
2022	Kino ljubov		TV Film
2023	Bistra voda	Arsen Gavrilski	TV Serija
2023	Crveniot poet	Petrovic	TV Serija
