= Stojan Stojkov =

Macedonian composer (born 1941)

Stojan Stojkov (born 1941 in Podaresh, Radovish) is a Macedonian composer and pedagogue. He completed his education on music at Belgrade Music Academy, where he graduated on the Department of Composition. Stojkov is author of numerous works of almost all genres and forms of music. His creative works include symphonies, vocal-instrumental, vocal, and staged works, chamber compositions, works for children and other kinds of music creative works.

== Work ==
Professor Stojkov has won several awards and expert recommendations for his social and professional work, among which is the Macedonian highest state award "11 October". Today Stojan Stojkov is full-time professor on the Faculty of Music Art in Skopje, Republic of Macedonia.

Stojkov's works are directly inspired by native folklore music tradition.

== Performances ==
Macedonia, Bulgaria, Albania, Greece, Turkey, Romania, Yugoslavia, Hungary, Croatia, USA, France, Germany, Italy, Sweden, Belgium, Canada, England and other countries.

== Awards ==
- "Pance Pesev" award for the composition "Mother Holy", 1985

For state and professional engagement the awards:

- YRT composition "Suite for string orchestra"
- "13th November" for the "Suite for string orchestra" and music achievements in 1987
- Macedonian Republic Culture Association
- Order for achievements with silver star

== Orchestral music ==
- Symphonic overture (1968),
- Andante for chamber orchestra (1970),
- Concert Music - for string orchestra and percussion (1975),
- Concerto - for cello and orchestra (1983),
- Symphonic Image (1985),
- Suite - for string orchestra (1986)
- I – suite for string orchestra, 1997
- Enlightenment – for symphonic orchestra, 1999

== Vocal - instrumental ==
- Ad libidum I – for female choir and chamber orchestra on folk text, 1987
- Ad libidum II – for female choir, two drums and four kavals, 1988
- Cantata Mirror - for children, female and male choir, orchestra, narrators and vocal soloists (1991)
- Young Goce, Young Vojvoda and Seni se, Goro – for choir, soloist and chamber orchestra on folk text, 1993
- Rakatka – for mixed choir and big folk orchestra on folk text, 1996
- Sumerian scripts – for two sopranos and string orchestra, on the poetry by Mihail Rendjov and Frederiko Garcia Llorka
- Five music vignettes – for soprano, violin and piano, on the poetry by Mihail Rendjov, 1999
- Three songs – for mezzo-soprano and symphonic orchestra

== Voice and orchestra ==
- Cycle songs- for mezzo-soprano and symphonic orchestra (1984),
- Holy Mother for voice, narrators, electronics and string orchestra on the text Zvonko Stojanovic and on folk text (1985)
- Thoughts - for mezzo-soprano, /kaval/ Macedonian brass instrument, tambura /Macedonian string instrument/, tapan/ Macedonian percussion instrument/ piano, synthesizer

== Chamber music ==
- Composition for piano, 1961
- Three miniatures for violin and piano, 1962
- Suite for basson and piano (1962),
- Suite for piano, 1962
- Trio for bassoon, clarinet and piano (1963),
- Nocturne for violin and piano (1963),
- Intermezzo for piano (1963),
- Rondo dramatico for clarinet and piano (1964),
- Scherzo for piano, 1964
- Variation for piano, 1964
- Sonata for piano, 1965
- String quartet (1967),
- Sonata for oboe and piano (1974),
- Prelude for flute and piano (1978),
- Three Pieces for flute and piano (1979),
- Pastoral suite for piano, 1979
- Baroque suite for flute, viola da gamba and cembalo, 1980
- Impression for double bass and piano (1981),
- Composition No. 1 Pastorala for trombone and piano, 1980
- Sonatinna for violin and piano, 1981
- Elegy for double bass and piano, 1981
- Baroque suite for double bass and piano, 1981
- Introduction for flute and piano, 1981
- Wind octet, 1985
- Wind quintet (1985)
- Sonata for piano No. 2, 1985
- Composition for solo flute, 1988
- Sonata for violoncello and piano, 1988 – 89
- Sonata for flute and piano, 1989
- Trio for oboe, clarinet and piano, 1996
- Preludium and Coral for trumpet and organ, 1997

== Choir ==
Mixed choir:

- Madrigal – text I. Mensetic, (1963),
- Karaorman (1963),
- Flowers –text Slavko Janevski, (1973),
- Farewell –text Koco Racin, (1973),
- Eyes –text Aco Sopov, (1974),
- My White-lake Mother Homeland-text Tome Bogdanovski, (1976),
- A Hero Departed native text, (1977),
- A farewell song –native text, (1984),
- "A note" – text by Mihail Rendjov, 1987
- "Hym for St. Kliment" – liturgical text

Female choir:

- Rural suite –native text (1973),
- Vocals (1979),
- Dew Drops (1981),
- St. Ilija Day Fire - text Tome Bogdanovski, (1984),
- Festive Song (1986),
- Triptych – text Ante Popovski, (1987),
- Sonatina – text Gane Todorovski, (1987),
- Ad libidum – native text, 1987
- Farewell song (1991)
- Diptych – native text, 1993

Children's choir:

The tenderness of happy tomorrow –text Aco Karamanov, (1973), "Two rural songs" –text native, 1974 "May song" for children's choir and piano-text Gligor Popovski, (1977), "Festive song about Mite and Stiv" for children's choir and mandolin orchestra, 1987 "This Country", 1989 Hymn for St. Kliment of Ohrid (1991)

Songs:

- Birth –for soprano and piano (1963),
- Sunset – for soprano and piano –text by Mateja Matevski (1970),
- Roads - for deep voice and piano - text by Mateja Matevski (1971),
- Preludium for high voice and piano (1974),
- Nerezi for voice and piano (1986)
- "And never", "Love" – for soprano and piano –text by Aco Karamanov

Mandolin orchestra - "Nocturne" – 1980 - "Suite" – 1985 - "Spring flower", (to my daughter), 1986 - "The Prilep fight", 1988 - "Kales Angja", 1988

Music for scene - "Spring tale" –musical for children for soloists, narrators, two children choirs, piano and orpharion instruments –text by Vanco Nikolevski, 1983 - "The Princess Drop" –music for children play by Video Podgorec, 1976 - "Sleep, my little one" and "Kitten" –text by Bistrica Mirkuloska, 1975 - "A song" –text by Stojan Tarapuza, 1976 - "When the armies sing" –text by Tome Bogdanovski - "Butterfly" –text by Bistrica Mirkuleska, 1981 - "Breakfast" –text by Bistrica Mirkuleska, 1981 - "Our army" text by Rajko Jovcevski, 1981 - "Lullaby" text by Bistrica Mirkuleska, 1981

Children songs - "Little star" –text by Nenad Dzambazov, 1971 - "Little bee" –text by Tome Bogdanovski, 1972

- Squirrel–text by Tome Bogdanovski (1973),
- "Sleep, my little one" and "Kitten" –text by Bistrica Mirkuloska, 1975
- "Song" –text by Stojan Tarapuza, 1976
- "When Lice sings" –text by Tome Bogdanovski, 1977

"Butterfly" and "Breakfast" –text by Bistrica Mirkuleska, 1981 - "Our army" text by Rajko Jovcevski, 1981 - "Lullaby" text by Bistrica Mirkuleska, 1981
