= Risto Bimbiloski =

Macedonian fashion designer

Risto Bimbiloski (born in 1975 in Macedonia) is a Macedonian and French fashion designer based in Paris, founder and creative director of Risto. He defines his style as Acidchique.

== Biography ==
A graduate of Ecole Duperré, Risto Bimbiloski started his career at Jean Colonna and Thierry Mugler. He showed his first collection at Hyères International Fashion Festival.

Risto Bimbiloski created the Risto brand as a handcrafted knitwear collection. His atelier started with four knitting artisans.

Risto Bimbiloski worked at Louis Vuitton (menswear knitwear), Kenzo with Humberto Leon & Carol Lim, Maison Margiela with John Galliano and Balenciaga with Demna Gvasalia. Celebrities such as Katy Perry, Maggie Gyllenhaal, Rowan Blanchard, Santigold, or Courtney Love wore Risto.

Tavi Gevinson selected Risto among the world's most significant and groundbreaking contemporary designers for the book Pattern (Phaidon Press Ltd). Risto products were distributed in 50 stores in the USA, Europe, and Asia.

== Bibliography ==
- Book : Pattern (Phaidon Press Ltd) — ISBN 0714849723
