= Najdi! =

Macedonian search engine

Najdi! (Macedonian: Најди!, meaning "Find!") is a search engine specialized in Macedonian media content. It can find news sites, blogs, and printed books. Instead of utilizing a web crawler like most search engines, Najdi! gathers its indexed content by directly interfacing with the websites it covers through RSS or other XML, in combination with the SWISH-E open-source software.

The engine was founded in 2004 by Petar Kajevski, a computer scientist and entrepreneur from North Macedonia. The search engine quickly rose to prominence due to the volume of information it covered, and the specific upgrades tailored for content in the Macedonian language. In 2005, Najdi! won a national competition in North Macedonia (then FYROM) and became said country's official candidate in the e-Inclusion category of the World Summit Award.

Najdi! is no longer reachable via its original link, but it can still be found in the Wayback Machine digital archive.
