= Olivera Nikolova =

Macedonian author (1936–2024)

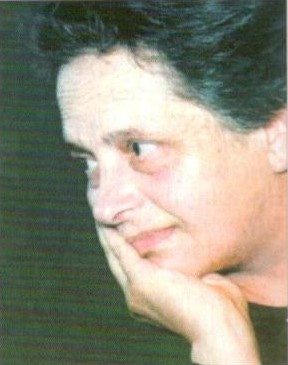

Olivera Nikolova (Macedonian: Оливера Николова, pronounced [ɔlivɛ'ra nikɔ'ɫɔva] 11 March 1936 – 3 November 2024) was a Macedonian author who was considered to be one of the top novelists of her country. She was born in 1936 in Skopje, Kingdom of Yugoslavia, now the capital of the Republic of North Macedonia. Nikolova graduated from the Faculty of Philosophy in Skopje, and worked as a screenwriter for radio and television programs. She wrote for children and adults.

Her well-known children books are Zoki Poki (a book considered to be a classic in Macedonian literature), The country where one can't arrive (awarded the Best Book of the Year at the Struga Poetry Evenings, 1966), The Friends Bon and Bona (Award of the Struga Poetry Evenings, 1975), My Sound (Mojot Zvuk; Yugoslav Award Mlado Pokolenje, 1978), Marko's Girlfriends, Loveaches, Stone Ciphers, The Crossing is not Lit, Light Year, etc. For exceptional accomplishments in the contemporary literature for young people, in 1983 she received the Zmaj Award, a prominent award from former Yugoslavia.

Her publications for adults are A Day for Summer Holiday (stories), the comedy Silver Apple (Srebrenoto Jabolko), the novels Narrow Door (Tesna Vrata; award Stale Popov, 1983), Homeworks, Adam's Rib (Racin's Award, 2000), Variations for Ibn Pajko, Rositsa's Dolls (Kuklite na rosica, Novel of the Year, 2004), as well as the book of drama writings entitled Silver Apple (Srebrenoto Jabolko),"Left ventricle (Leva komora)", White smoke (Beliot Čad), "Small House (Kuќička) Award nomination Balkanika 2011", The velvet schroud (Kadifeanata pokrivka, Stole Popov award 2015), The dog with sad look (Pesot so tazen pogled, Novel of the Year Foundation Slavko Janevski, 2019).

Nikolova died on 4 November 2024, at the age of 88.
