= Blaga Aleksova =

Macedonian archaeologist (1922– 2007)

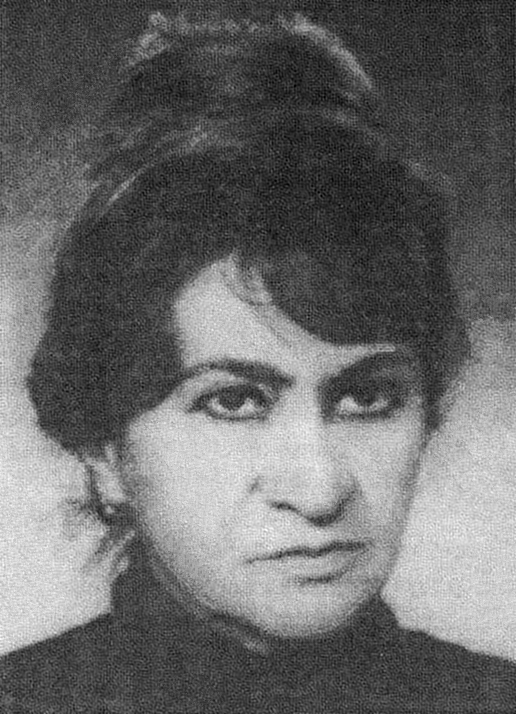
- Born: Blaga Aleksova; 24 January 1922; Tetovo, Kingdom of Yugoslavia
- Died: 12 July 2007 (aged 85); Skopje, Macedonia
- Occupation: Archaeologist

Blaga Aleksova (Macedonian: Блага Алексова; 24 January 1922 – 12 July 2007) was a Macedonian archaeologist.

== Bibliography ==
She graduated from high school and studied at the Art History Department of the Saints Cyril and Methodius University in Skopje. She obtained her doctorate in medieval archeology in 1958 at the University of Lublin. In the years 1948–1950 she worked as a curator at the Skopje City Museum, and then for 15 years managed the Department of Medieval Archeology at the Archeological Museum. In 1962–1975 she was the director of this museum. In 1971 and 1983 she was a scholarship holder at Dumbarton Oaks. In the years 1975–1983 she worked at the Institute of Art History as a professor of medieval and early Christian archeology. In 1983 she retired. From 1997 she was a member of the Macedonian Academy of Sciences and Arts.

In 1952–1956 she conducted research in the Demir Kapija area, where she discovered the ruins of an early Christian basilica recognized as a monument of Macedonian history. In 2011, a decision was made to reconstruct it. As part of Yugoslav-American research projects, she conducted research in Bargali and Stobi. During the work carried out in 1966–1971, a basilica, a city tank and a residential complex were discovered in Bargala. In 1975 she conducted archaeological works at the Kale archaeological site at the mouth of the Złetowska and Bregałnica rivers, near the town of Krupiszte. Based on research, it proved that it was established at Glagolitic Cyril and Methodius, although not all scientists agree with her theorem. In 1981 she conducted research in Stobi in the area of pre-war archaeological research, where she discovered the basilica, which turned out to be the oldest Christian church in Macedonia.

== Publications ==
- Episcopate at Bregałnica: Slovenian Crkowen and Kulturno-prosweten centar wo Makedonija 1989
- Studies in the antiquities of Stobi. Volume III 1981 Co-author: James Wiseman
- Prosek-Demir Kapija. Slovenska necropolis and slovenian necropolis at Makedonija Skopje 1966
- Loca sanctorum Macedoniae = Kult na martirite vo Makedonija from IV to IX vek Skopje 1995

== Commemoration ==
- In 2008, the Macedonian Academy of Sciences and Arts published the book Spomenica posweten na Błaga Ałeksowa, a redo member at Makedonskata Akademija na Naukite i Umetnosti
