= Oliver Dimitrioski =

Macedonian handball coach

Personal information
- Nationality: Macedonian
- Born: 31 January 1972 (age 54) Prilep, SR Makedonija, SFR Yugoslavia

Sport
- Sport: Handball
- Position: Coach

Teams managed
- Years: Team
- 1992–1994: IFC Nykoping Sweden
- 1998–2000: HC Pegasus - Prilep
- 2002–2004: HC Prilep - Prilep
- 2008–2021: RK Metalurg Skopje

Oliver Dimitrioski (born 31 January 1972) is a Macedonian handball coach. He coached RK Metalurg Skopje and serves as the head coach of youth national team of Macedonia 2 years (2015, 2017) at the international handball tournament.

== Career ==
=== Player ===
- HC Tutunski Kombinat-Prilep
- HC Struga-Struga
- HC Kumanovo - Kumanovo
- IFC Nykoping – Nykoping -Sweden
- HC Gostivar - Gostvar
- HC Jug - Skopje
- HC Pegasus - Prilep

=== Coach ===
- IFC Nykoping senior team women 1992/1994
- HC Pegasus senior team men 1998/2000
- HC Prilep senior team men 2002/2004
- HC Metalurg youth team 2008/2011
- HC Metalurg junior team 2011/2014
- HC Metalurg 2 senior team 2014/2017
- HC Prilep senior team 2017/18
- HC Metalurg senior team assistant coach 2018/19
- HC Metalurg senior team head coach 2018/19 (play off)
- HC Macedonia youth national team (2015, 2017)

=== Results ===
- CUP winner of Macedonia -2018/19
- First place (U 16 Metalurg) – 2018/19
- Winner of the Master de Grenoble France – 2019
- First place Winter Skopje CUP tournament - 2019
- First place international tournament - Ilinden CUP 2018
- Best coach in Macedonia (junior) –2015/16
- First place (junior Metalurg) –2015/16
- First place (youth Metalurg) - 2014/15
- Third place (junior Metalurg) - 2014/15
