= Viktor Damceski =

Macedonian handball player

Personal information
- Nationality: Macedonian
- Born: 5 September 1996 (age 30) Skopje, Macedonia
- Height: 1.87 m (6 ft 2 in)

Sport
- Sport: Handball
- Position: Left wing
- Current club: (North Macedonia) RK Tineks Prolet
- Number: 20

Youth career
- Years: Team
- –: (North Macedonia) RK Metalurg Skopje
- –: (North Macedonia) RK Tineks Prolet

Senior clubs
- Years: Team
- 2015-: (North Macedonia) RK Tineks Prolet

Viktor Damceski (Macedonian: Виктор Дамчески; born 5 September 1996) is a Macedonian handball player who plays for RK Tineks Prolet.
