= Borjan Madzovski =

Macedonian handball player

Personal information
- Nationality: Macedonian
- Born: 8 May 1994 (age 32) Skopje, Macedonia
- Height: 1.94 m (6 ft 4 in)

Sport
- Sport: Handball
- Position: Left back
- Current club: RK Pelister
- Number: 5

Senior clubs
- Years: Team
- 2015: (North Macedonia) RK Metalurg Skopje
- 2015–2017: (North Macedonia) RK Pelister
- 2017: (North Macedonia) RK Borec
- 2018: (North Macedonia) RK Metalurg Skopje
- 2018–2019: (North Macedonia) RK Pelister
National team
- Years: Team
- 2013–: Macedonia

Borjan Madzovski (Macedonian: Борјан Маџовски) (born 8 May 1994) is a Macedonian handball player who plays as left back for RK Pelister.

His twin brother Bojan Madzovski is also a handball player, who has represented the North Macedonia national team.
