= Petar Kajevski =

Macedonian IT and management expert

Petar Kajevski (Macedonian: Петар Кајевски) (born 1974) is a Macedonian IT and management expert. He is most famous as creator of the Macedonian search engine "Najdi!", but also achieved prominence as expert on software outsourcing.

He finished his undergraduate studies at the Faculty of Electrical Engineering in Skopje, and earned two master's degrees: from the London School of Economics in 2004, and St Gallen University, Switzerland, in 2005.
