= Svetlana Antonovska =

Macedonian statistician (1952–2016)

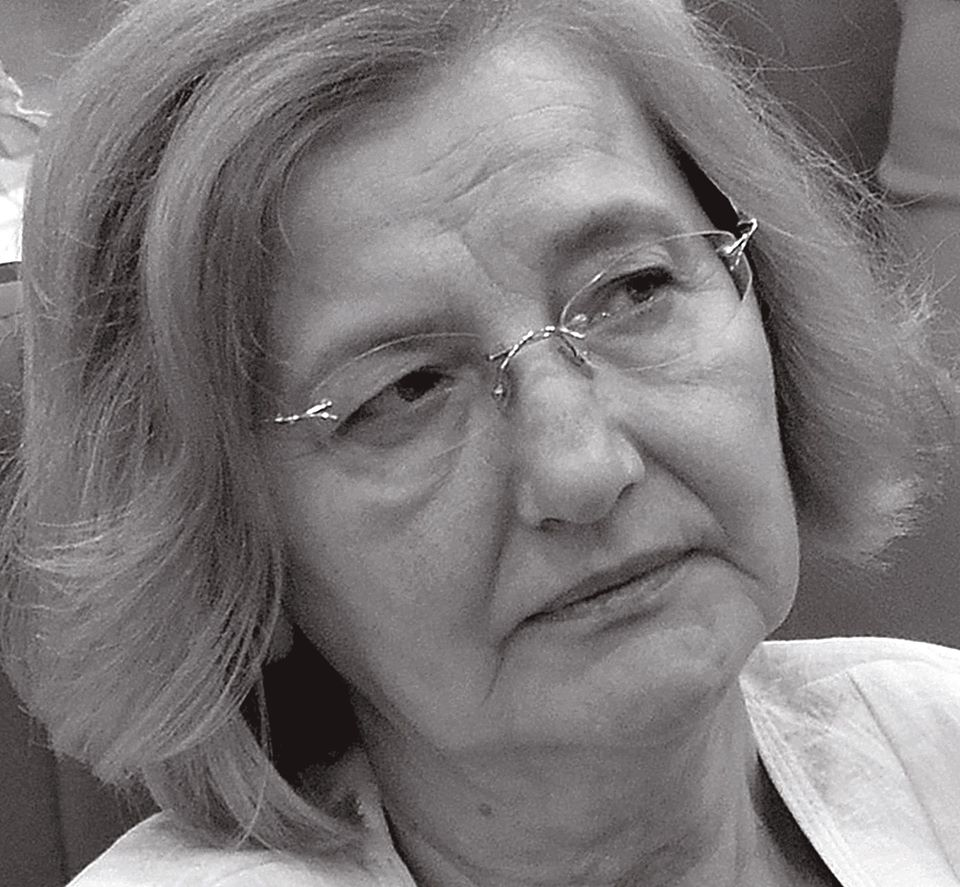
- Svetlana Antonovska
- In office 1986–2001

Personal details
- Born: April 6, 1952 Belgrade
- Died: October 7, 2016 (aged 64)
- Education: Institute of Mathematics (Applied Mathematics), Faculty of Natural Sciences and Mathematics, Skopje

Svetlana Antonovska (Светлана Антоновска, April 6, 1952 – October 7, 2016) was a Macedonian statistician. She headed the State Statistical Office of the Republic of Macedonia from its founding in 1991 until 2001, brought the office into communication with several major international statistical organizations, and founded the first census of the republic.
