= Fana Kočovska =

Macedonian communist, fighter and national hero

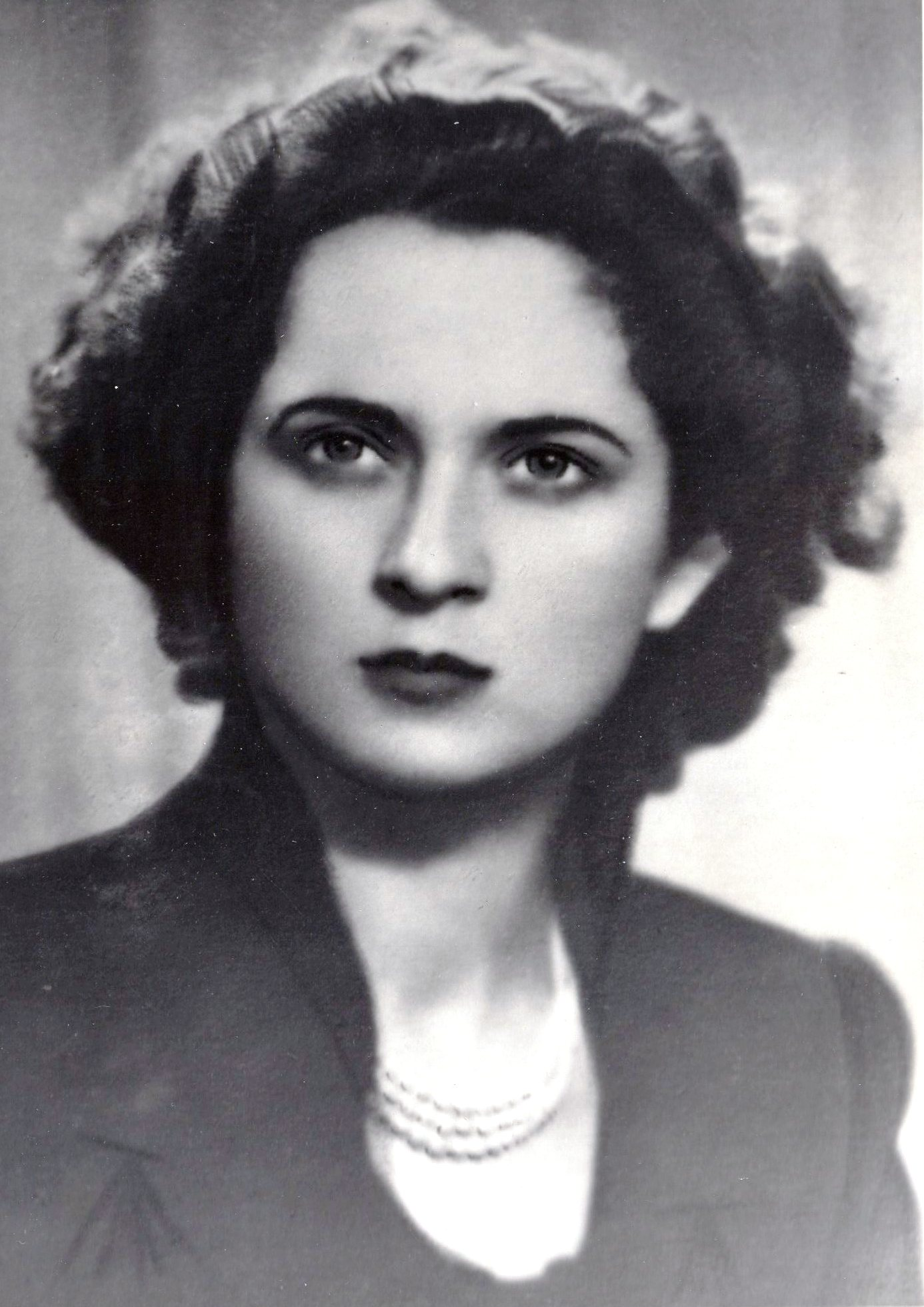
- Born: July 27, 1927; Lavci, Kingdom of Yugoslavia
- Died: April 17, 2004 (aged 76); Skopje, Republic of Macedonia
- Organization: Yugoslav Partisans
- Awards

Fana Petra Kočovska-Cvetković (July 27, 1927 - April 17, 2004) was a Macedonian communist, fighter and national hero. She was the youngest named National Hero of Yugoslavia.

At less than 14 years of age she became a youth activist. In 1942 she was a partisan in the Bitola detachment "Goce Delčev" and a youth leader in the troop "Stiv Naumov". She participated in the February raid.

After WWII, she performed high social and public functions. She died on April 17, 2004, in Skopje, in then Republic of Macedonia.

== Early life ==
She was born on July 27, 1927, in Lavci, a village near Bitola, to a poor family. Her father emigrated to the United States of America for work when she was less than three years old. During Fana's childhood, she was said to have helped her mother work in crop fields to support the family, due to her father's salary not being substantial enough.

== Second World War ==
After the invasion of Yugoslavia in April 1941, in the village Lavci there was Yugoslav Communist organization, where she worked as an active member of SKOJ. Bulgarian police managed to catch one member of SKOJ who praised the work of the organization and its members. Fana was able to escape from the police, who came to the village to find her, entered her house.

Fana continued to work illegally. Soon after, before she was even fifteen, she went to the partisan unit "Jane Sandanski". In the spring of 1944, she was part of a Partisan group, which had to stop production at a mine. The task was to attack bunkers maintained by Bulgarian authorities. The job was done, but Fana was wounded. Companions barely escaped from the enemy. They decided to leave her to be treated in the village. Fana refused to stay in the village, and continued to fight in the brigade.

During a Battle in the village Lavci in 1943, the commander Tošo Angelovski, a young striker Pande Haize and several others were killed. She hid near the village for about a month and a half with a group of partisans. They were surrounded by the Bulgarian patrols that were looking for them day and night, knowing that they were nearby. Fana was a participant in the February march in 1944, from Kožuf to Kozjak. She was a leader of the youth battalion "Stiv Naumov".

== Used literature ==
- Narodni heroji Jugoslavije (book). "Mladost", Belgrade 1975.
