= Andrej Markudov =

Macedonian handball player

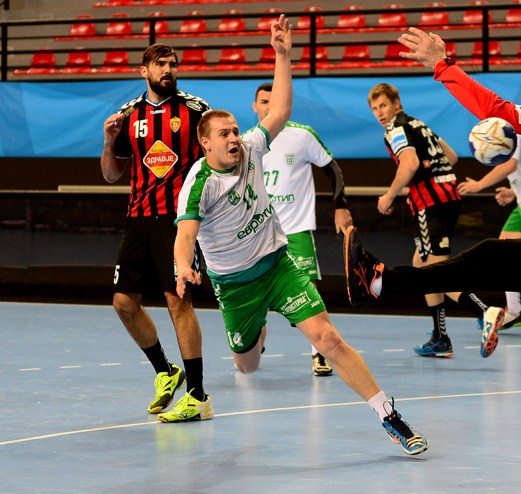
- Andrej Markudov with RK Pelister against RK Vardar in SC Jane Sandanski

Personal information
- Nationality: Macedonian
- Born: March 23, 1996 (age 30) Skopje, Macedonia
- Height: 1.92 m (6 ft 4 in)

Sport
- Sport: Handball
- Position: Line Player
- Current club: RK Aerodrom
- Number: 17

Youth career
- Years: Team
- –: (North Macedonia) RK Metalurg II

Senior clubs
- Years: Team
- 2015–2017: (North Macedonia) RK Pelister
- 2017–2018: (North Macedonia) RK Butel Skopje
- 2019: (North Macedonia) RK Junior Kisela Voda
- 2019–: (North Macedonia) RK Aerodrom

Andrej Markudov (Macedonian: Андреј Маркудов) (born March 23, 1996) is a Macedonian handball player for RK Aerodrom.

== Biography ==
Andrej began playing handball at the age of 13. Scouts from RK Metalurg found him and immediately offered him a 5-year contract. As a top prospect in his position, he secured his place on the Metalurg youth team and in the national youth categories. Beginning in 2011, he played in every national match, totaling over 100 games for the national team. However, he ultimately missed the 2017 World Men's Handball Championship due to a lack of playing time with his club.

In 2015, he was traded to RK Pelister in a swap involving four players. His time in Bitola was inconsistent, as the team changed coaches throughout his two-year stay. He was most impacted by legendary coach Kasim Kamenica.

After leaving RK Pelister in August 2017, he joined the ambitious project of RK Butel Skopje, a new, promising team in Macedonian handball.
