= Mihail Solunov =

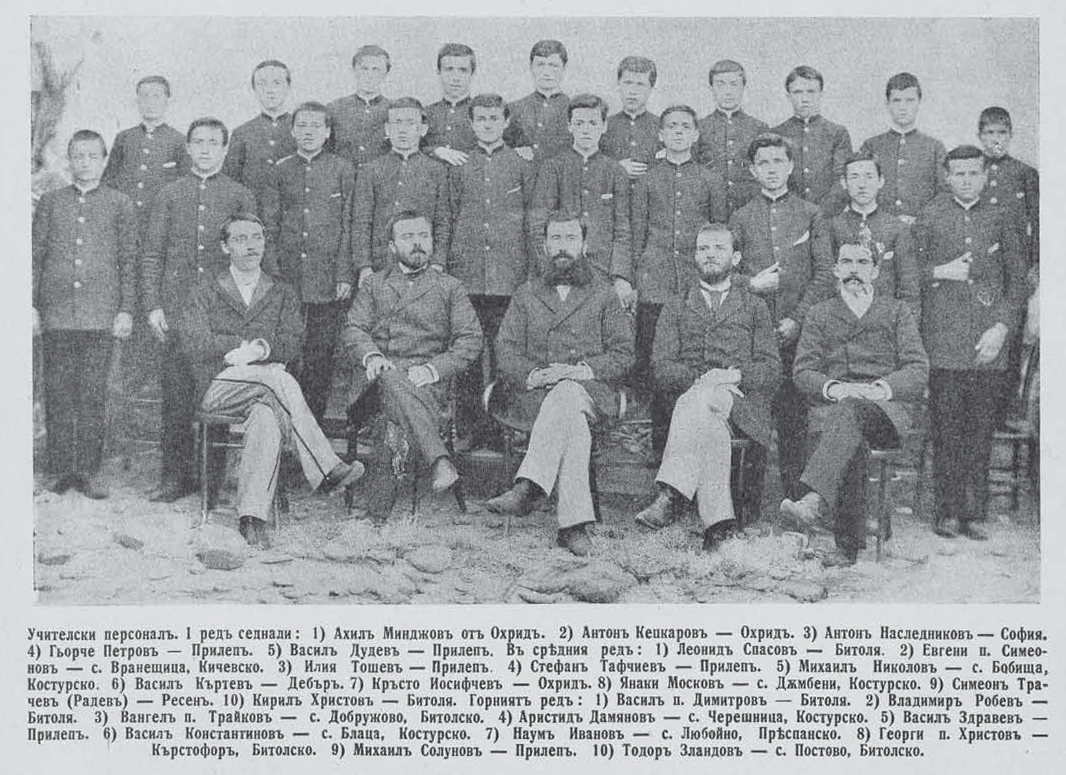
Teachers and pupils from Bulgarian boys' school in Bitola. Solunov is the second person on the third row from right to left.

Mihail Petrov Solunov (Macedonian and Bulgarian: Михаил Петров Солунов; 1877–1956) was a journalist and monk.

== Biography ==
Born in Prilep, in the then-Ottoman Empire, he completed the Bulgarian boys' school in Bitola and afterwards studied at the Bulgarian Men's High School of Thessaloniki. In 1901 he graduated from the Faculty of Philosophy in Belgrade. Solunov was one of the founders of the Macedonian Club in Belgrade in 1902. There he also co-founded the Balkanski Glasnik newspaper, which promoted Macedonian nationalism and separatism with regard to church, language, and autonomy.

Solunov completed law school in Geneva and theology school in Sofia. Later he moved to Ruse, where he worked as a teacher. After the 1934 military coup in Bulgaria, he was the mayor of Ivaylovgrad. During World War II, Solunov subsequently served as mayor of Dolneni, Vitolište, Samokov and Žbevac in the Bulgarian occupation zone of Yugoslavia. After the war, he became a monk under the name Mina and died at Rila Monastery in 1956.
