= Nežilovo, Čaška =

Nežilovo Нежилово
- Village
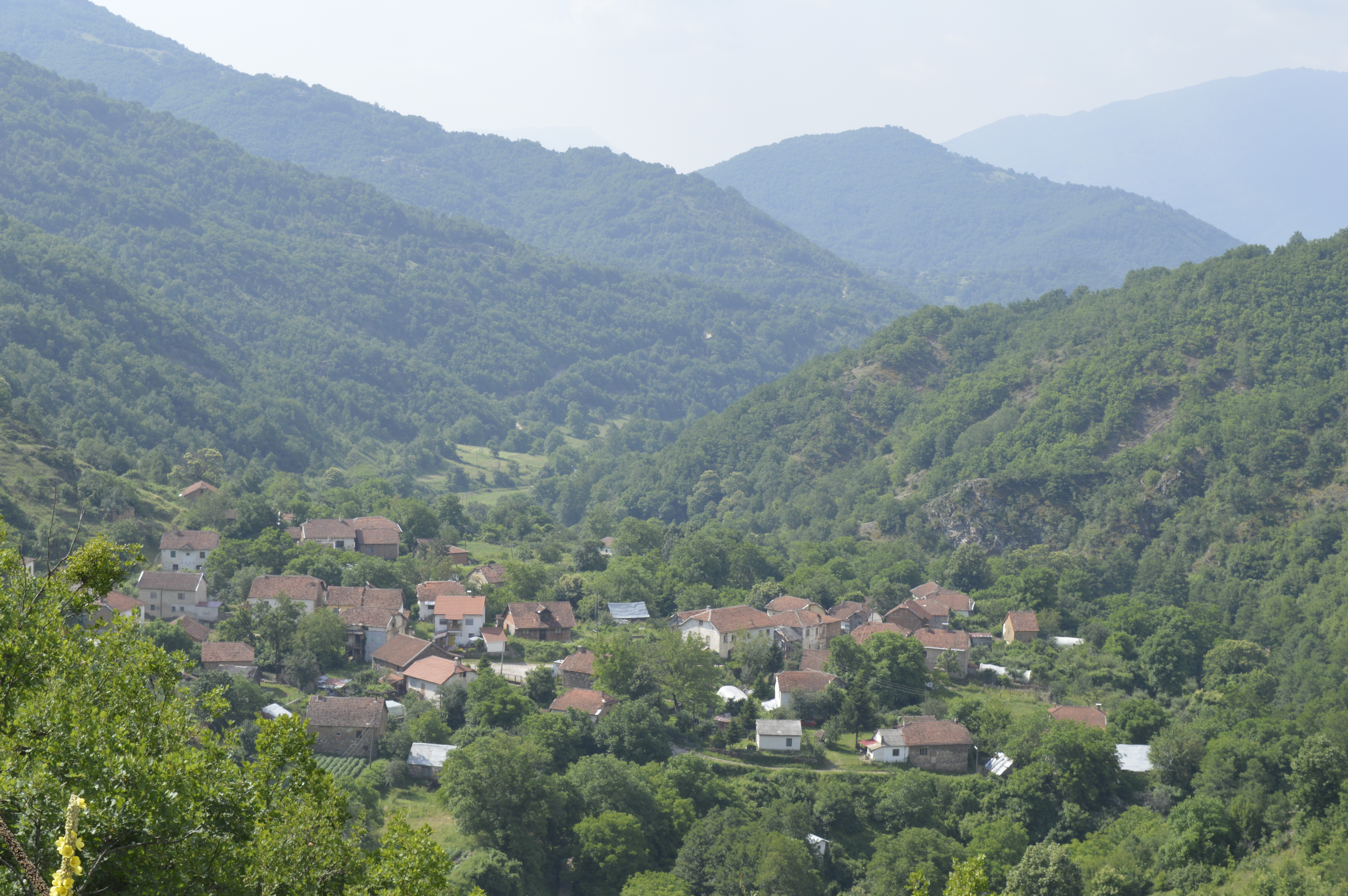
- Panoramic view of the village

- Location within North Macedonia
- Country: North Macedonia
- Region: Vardar
- Municipality: Čaška

Population (2021)
  - Total: 33
- Time zone: UTC+1 (CET)
  - Summer (DST): UTC+2 (CEST)
- Website: .

Nežilovo (Macedonian: Нежилово) is a village in the municipality of Čaška, North Macedonia. It used to be part of the former municipality of Bogomila.

== Demographics ==
On the 1927 ethnic map of Leonhard Schulze-Jena, the village is shown as a Serbianized Bulgarian Christian village. According to the 2021 census, the village had a total of 33 inhabitants. Ethnic groups in the village include:

- Macedonians 30
- Others 3

Year	Macedonian	Albanian	Turks	Romani	Vlachs	Serbs	Bosniaks	Persons for whom data are taken from admin. sources	Total
2002	63	...	...	...	...	...	...	...	63
2021	30	...	...	...	...	...	...	3	33
