= Lou Naumovski =

Canadian entrepreneur

Lou Naumovski, also in French "Louis" and in Macedonian "Ljupco", (born 1957 in Bitola, Macedonia) is a Canadian entrepreneur of Macedonian descent, Vice President and Director General of the Moscow Representative Office of the Kinross Gold Corporation, the largest foreign gold miner in Russia.

== Life and career ==
Lou (Ljupco) Naumovski was born in Bitola, Macedonia (Yugoslavia) on 17 November 1956. His father emigrated to Canada in 1958 and Lou, his sister and Mother joined him in March, 1961. Lou grew up and was educated in Canada. In 1972 he travelled with his family for a visit back to Yugoslavia for the first time since they emigrated.

After graduating from Humberside Collegiate Institute in Toronto in 1974,

Following graduation he joined the Trade Commissioner Service in June, 1980. His assignments included Moscow, Atlanta/Georgia, Baghdad/Iraq. He started his career in the Canadian Foreign Service.

From 1988 to 1990 he was Deputy Director for Trade and Investment Development, Eastern Europe and the USSR at the Department of External Affairs and International Trade in Ottawa.

Lou Naumovski helped to launch, and was also the first Executive Director of the "Canada - USSR Business Council" from 1990 to 1992.

From 1992 to 2000, Naumovski was a member of the Russia Team of the European Bank for Reconstruction and Development (EBRD), 1992-1997 as Resident Representative and Senior Banker in Moscow and as Senior Banker in London from 1997 to 2000.

From August 2000 to July 2007 Naumovski was Senior Vice President at Visa International, Central Europe, Middle East and Africa Division (CEMEA). He led the development of Visa's business in Russia and the eleven other countries of the Commonwealth of Independent States and was also Head of Strategy for the CEMEA Division from 2005 to 2007.

In September 2007 Lou Naumovski joined Kinross Gold Corporation. From October 2007 to December 2016 he was Vice President and Head of Kinross’ Moscow Office. Kinross was one of the leading gold producers in Russia through its Kupol property in Chukotka in Russian Far East. After retiring from full-time employment with Kinross, Naumovski

Naumovski was a member of the Moscow and National Board of Directors of the "Canada – Eurasia – Russia Business Council" (CERBA) from 2007 to 2017.

From 2007 to 2013 was also a non-executive member of the board of directors of the Center of Financial Technologies (CFT), a leading Russian private company in the financial services software and payment industry.

Naumovski was one of the founding directors, and subsequently an honorary member of the board of directors of "Macedonia 2025" (until 2018), a non-profit international association of Macedonians in the Diaspora dedicated to supporting the economic and social development of the Republic of Macedonia.

Since retiring from full-time work at Kinross, Lou has been active as a corporate advisor (from January–September 2017 for Kinross Gold); Advisor on Russia to the World Gold Council (2017-2018); Director, Trans-Siberian Gold Corp. (www.trans-siberiangold.com) Aug 2017 – August 2021; Advisor on Central Asia to Seequent mining software (www.seequent.com) August 2017 to present; Advisor to BRP Europe (www.brp.com) on Russia, June 2018 – January 2020; Advisor to McCain Foods (Europe – www.mccain.com), March 2019 to March 2022;; Non-Executive Director, Amur Minerals Corporation (LSE-AIM listed; www.amurminerals.com) January 2017 – June 2020; and, Non-Executive Director from Nov 2017 to July 2019, Euromax Resources (www.euromax.com); Advisor on Russia to Kinross Gold Corporation (www.kinross.com), January – December, 2017, and; Non-Executive Director, GV Gold (https://www.gvgold.ru/en/) March 2021- April 2022

He is a Member of the Board of Directors, Canadian Executive Services Organization (www.ceso-saco.com), October 2016 to present; and a Member of the Board of Directors, Canadian International Council (https://thecic.org), October 2021 to present;

Lou Naumovski is married with two children and has homes in Mississauga and in Utterson, Ontario.

== Notes ==
- Good Times in the Gulag The Globe and Mail, by Paul Christopher, March 23, 2011 updated Thursday, August 23, 2012.
- The Moscow Times, Q&A: If Only the School Bullies Could See Lou Naumovski Now, Biographical details on Lou Naumovski, by Andrew McChesney, 17 August 2012.
- Russia and Eurasia Mining Conference March 6, 2012 Presentation of Naumovski on Kinross Gold Corporation Effective Investments in Russia's Gold Mining Industry
