= Sara Stevanoska =

Macedonian handball player (born 1993)

Personal information
- Nationality: Macedonian
- Born: August 28, 1993 (age 33) Prilep, Macedonia
- Height: 1.75 m (5 ft 9 in)

Sport
- Sport: Handball
- Position: Back
- Current club: Zağnos SK
- Number: 6

Senior clubs
- Years: Team
- 2012–2013: RK Vardar
- 2013–2015: ZORK Jagodina
- 2015: Genç Uşak SK
- 2016–: Zağnos SK
National team
- Years: Team
- –: Macedonia

Sara Stevanoska (Macedonian: Сара Стефановски; born August 28, 1993) is a Macedonian handball player for Turkish club Zağnos SK and the Macedonian national team.

Stevanoska played for RK Vardar in North Macedonia and ZORK Jagodina in Serbia before transferring to Genç Uşak SK of the Turkish Women's Handball Super League in July 2015. She joined Trabzon-based club Zağnos SK in December 2015.

She participated in the 2012–13 Women's EHF Cup as well as the Women's EHF Cup Winners' Cup in 2013-14 and 2014-15.
