= Filip Derkoski =

Macedonian swimmer

Personal information
- Nationality: North Macedonia
- Born: 29 December 2000 (age 25) Skopje, Macedonia
- Height: 1.80 m (5 ft 11 in)

Sport
- Sport: Swimming
- Club: SWC Orion

Filip Derkoski (born 29 December 2000) is a Macedonian swimmer. He competed in the 2020 Summer Olympics.
