= Marko Ognjanovski =

Macedonian handball player

Personal information
- Nationality: Macedonian
- Born: 14 June 1997 (age 29) Skopje, Macedonia
- Height: 1.85 m (6 ft 1 in)

Sport
- Sport: Handball
- Position: Line Player
- Current club: (North Macedonia) RK Tineks Prolet
- Number: 4

Youth career
- Years: Team
- –: (North Macedonia) RK Tineks Prolet

Senior clubs
- Years: Team
- 2015-: (North Macedonia) RK Tineks Prolet

Marko Ognjanovski (Macedonian: Марко Огњановски) (born 14 June 1997) is a Macedonian handball player who plays for RK Tineks Prolet.
