= Elena Velevska =

Elena Velevska Елена Велевска
- Also known as: Elena
- Born: 26 October 1980 (age 45); Prilep, SR Macedonia, SFR Yugoslavia
- Genres: Folk, pop
- Occupation: Singer
- Years active: 2003–present
- Label: Payner

Elena Velevska (Macedonian: Елена Велевска; born 26 October 1980) is a Macedonian turbo-folk and popular music singer. Due to her dress and musical style, which resembles that of Ceca, as well as her strong presence in the yellow press of the successor states of Yugoslavia, she is at times called "the Macedonian Ceca". In 2007, she conducted a world tour, playing in front of large diaspora audiences.

In 2008, it was announced that she is expecting a baby and therefore is having a break from the music. She also married in beginning of the year in Ohrid.

== Discography ==
=== Albums ===
- Пу пу машала (Pu pu mashala)
- Говорот на телото (Govorot na teloto)
- Жена огнена (Žena ognena)
