= Niko Nestor =

Macedonian open water swimmer and water polo player

Personal information
- Born: 10 June 1934 Struga, Yugoslavia
- Died: February 26, 2016 (aged 81)

Sport
- Sport: Swimming

Niko Nestor (Macedonian: Нико Нестор; born June 10, 1934) was a Macedonian amateur open water swimmer. He was also a water polo player.

Nestor was the first man to swim across Lake Ohrid in Macedonia and the first Eastern European man to swim the English Channel. He was named the Honorary Life President of the International Swimming Marathon in Macedonia. The Niko Nestor Charity was created after him, and the Niko Nestor Award is given to swimmers who have made a significant difference in their country.

== Biography ==
=== Early life ===
Born in 1934 in Struga in what was then Yugoslavia, Nestor as a young child spent time in the water springs of the Black Drim river flowing from the Ohrid Lake as a young child. In 1945, at age 10, he joined the Swimming Club ‘Ohridski Branovi’ (Ohrid Waves). After participating in swimming courses organised by the Macedonian Swimming Committee under the auspices of the Yugoslav Swimming Federation, Nestor won races in Split, Croatia as a member of the Macedonian team.

In 1948 at the Juniors Championship held in Ohrid, Nestor earned five championship titles in the 50m, 100m, and 400m freestyle. Later, he set Macedonian records in the 50m, 200m, 400m, 1000m, and 1500m in freestyle as well as in breaststroke and backstroke. Between 1949 and 1954, he dominated distances including the 50m, 100m, 200m, 400m, and 1500m freestyles.

On August 2, 1954, he won his first open water competition, a 2.5 km race in Ohrid Lake from Gorica to Ohrid. At the same time he was swimming for Macedonia internationally, he also represented Macedonia in water polo as he played for the Ohridski Branovi water polo club. Over time, he set new distances from St. Stefan to Ohrid, from Pestani to Ohrid, and from St. Naum to Ohrid.

=== Ohrid Lake ===
Nestor intensively trained daily in the cold waters of the Ohrid Lake springs and became the first person to swim the 33 km distance from St. Naum to Struga for 11 hours 28 minutes on August 19, 1958, with his coach Slave Filev, journalist Boris Pop Gorcev, observers Kliment Zarov and Goko Dimic, Dr. Serafimov Ljupco, and escort pilo Ivo Sersic

In 1959, Nestor swam the 24 km course from St. Naum to Ohrid in 6 hours 45 minutes. His accomplishment led to an annual marathon swimming competition that continues to this day as a FINA Open Water Swimming Grand Prix event.

=== English Channel ===
On September 9, 1959, Nestor successfully swam the English Channel. Starting from Cap Gris Nez in France 36 minutes after midnight, Nestor was accompanied via boat by his personal coach Kliment Zarov and judges. He swam alongside Mexican Miguel Gonzales Lopes and Spaniard Rodolfo Rodriguez. Nestor arrived at St. Margaret's Bay in Dover, England after 12 hours and 6 minutes, becoming the first man from the Eastern Bloc to complete it. The event was organised by the Channel Swimming Association and supported by Butlin's International Cross Channel Swim.

After his Channel swim, Nestor received offers to compete in open water competitions in the US and Canada. However, lack of money prevented him from attending. Nestor did participate in 1960 around the Island Atlantic City Swim in Atlantic City, New Jersey, where he won the amateur division.

=== Other ===
Besides his sports career, Nestor spent 10 years as a deputy manager in the Italian Headquarters - Milano Branch office of a trade company.
