= Beni Osmanoski =

Professional kickboxer

- Born: April 18, 1988 (age 38); Oktisi, North Macedonia
- Height: 180 cm (5 ft 11 in)
- Weight: 81–84 kg (179–185 lb; 12 st 11 lb – 13 st 3 lb)
- Division: Middleweight
- Style: Kickboxing K1
- Fighting out of: Biel, Switzerland
- Team: Team Osmanoski
- Years active: 19

Kickboxing record
- Total: 81
- Wins: 64
- By knockout: 43
- Losses: 16
- By knockout: 2
- Draws: 1

Other information
- Boxing record from BoxRec

Beni Osmanoski (born 18 April 1988), also known as Beni the Dog, is a professional kickboxer. He is a four-time Swiss champion, four-time European champion and seven-time world champion.

== Titles ==
- Austria Open WAKO kickboxing with lowkick Vice World Champion 2008
- Swiss Champion Muay Thai -86 kg 09
- Swiss Champion Class A (SCOS) Swiss Combat System 2010
- Winner of 4 man tournament middleweight winner by two KOs
- Swiss Champion PRO K1Rules WFC 2011 winner by KO 2nd round middleweight, opponent Ylli Rashiti, Kosovo
- Defending PRO K-1 rules WFC title 2012 winner by KO 1st round, opponent Ylli Rashiti, Kosovo
- European Champion WFC 2012 Thaiboxing middleweight winner by KO 1st round, opponent Romain Falendry, France
- European Champion K-1 rules 2014 ISKA middleweight winner by decision of the judges, opponent Denis Vuicic Srbija
- European Champion K-1 rules 2015 World Professional Kickboxing Council winner by KO in 1st round, opponent Vittorio Lermano, Italy
- European Champion K-1 rules 2014 WFMC winner by KO 2nd round, opponent Dimitry Mekhanikov, Russia
- World Champion ISKA K-1 rules 2016 winner by KO 2nd round, opponent Abdel Moulay, France
- World Champion K-1 rules WKU 2015 middleweight winner by TKO 4th round, opponent Martin Kalucz, Hungary
- Defending World Champion title WKU 2016 winner by decision by the judges, opponent Ömer Kocak, Turkey
- Defending World Champion title WKU 2017 winner by KO 2nd round, opponent Almedin Hasanagic, Bosnia and Herzegovina
- Defending World Champion title WKU 2017 winner by majority decision, opponent Damian Darker, Ireland
- World Karate and Kickboxing Association World Champion winner by majority decision (09/04/2022)
- Fight4Glory Championship World Champion -85 kg winner second round with TKO in Struga Nordmacedonian 28–07–2023

== Titles ==
Year	Event/Organization	Titles	Opponent	Result	Location
2008	Austria Open WAKO	Vice Champion (lowkick)	–	–	Австрија
2009	Swiss Muay Thai Championship	National Champion (-86 kg)	–	Победник K.O 2 рунда	Швајцарија
2010	SCOS Swiss Combat System	National Champion Class A	–	Победник K.O 1 рунда	Швајцарија
| WFC PRO 4-Man Tournament (Middleweight)–	4-Man Tournament (Middleweight)	Победник	Ylli Rashiti/Heino Bögelsack–	2 КО	Швајцарија
| 2011	WFC	Шваицарски шампион PRO K-1 rules	Ylli Rashiti (Косово)	КО, 2. рунда	Швајцарија
2012	WFC	Одбрана на Нациинална титула PRO K-1	Ylli Rashiti (Косово)	КО, 1. рунда	Швајцарија
2012	WFC	Европски шампион Thaiboxing (middleweight)	Romain Falendry (Франција)	КО, 1. рунда	–
2014	ISKA	Европски шампион K-1 rules (middleweight)	Denis Vuicic (Србија)	Победа по одлука	–
2014	WFMC	Европски шампион K-1 rules	Dimitry Mekhanikov (Русија)	КО, 2. рунда	–
2015	WPKC	Европски шампион K-1 rules	Vittorio Lermano (Италија)	КО, 1. рунда	–
2015	WKU	Светски шампион K-1 rules (middleweight)	Martin Kalucz (Унгарија)	ТКО, 4. рунда	–
2016	ISKA	Светски шампион K-1 rules	Abdel Moulay (Франција)	КО, 2. рунда	–
2016	WKU	Одбрана на светска титула	Ömer Kocak (Турција)	Победа по одлука	–
2017	WKU	Одбрана на светска титула	Almedin Hasanagic (БиХ)	КО, 2. рунда	–
2017	WKU	Одбрана на светска титула	Damian Darker (Ирска)	Победа со Т.К.О	–
2022-04-09	WKKA	Светски шампион K-1 rules	Ibo Topürek( Турција) –	Победа со едногласна одлука	–
2023-07-28	Fight4Glory Championship	Светски шампион (-85 kg)	Алмедин Хасанагич (Словенија)–	ТКО, 2. рунда	Струга, Северна Македонија
