= Vladimir Četkar =

Macedonian musician

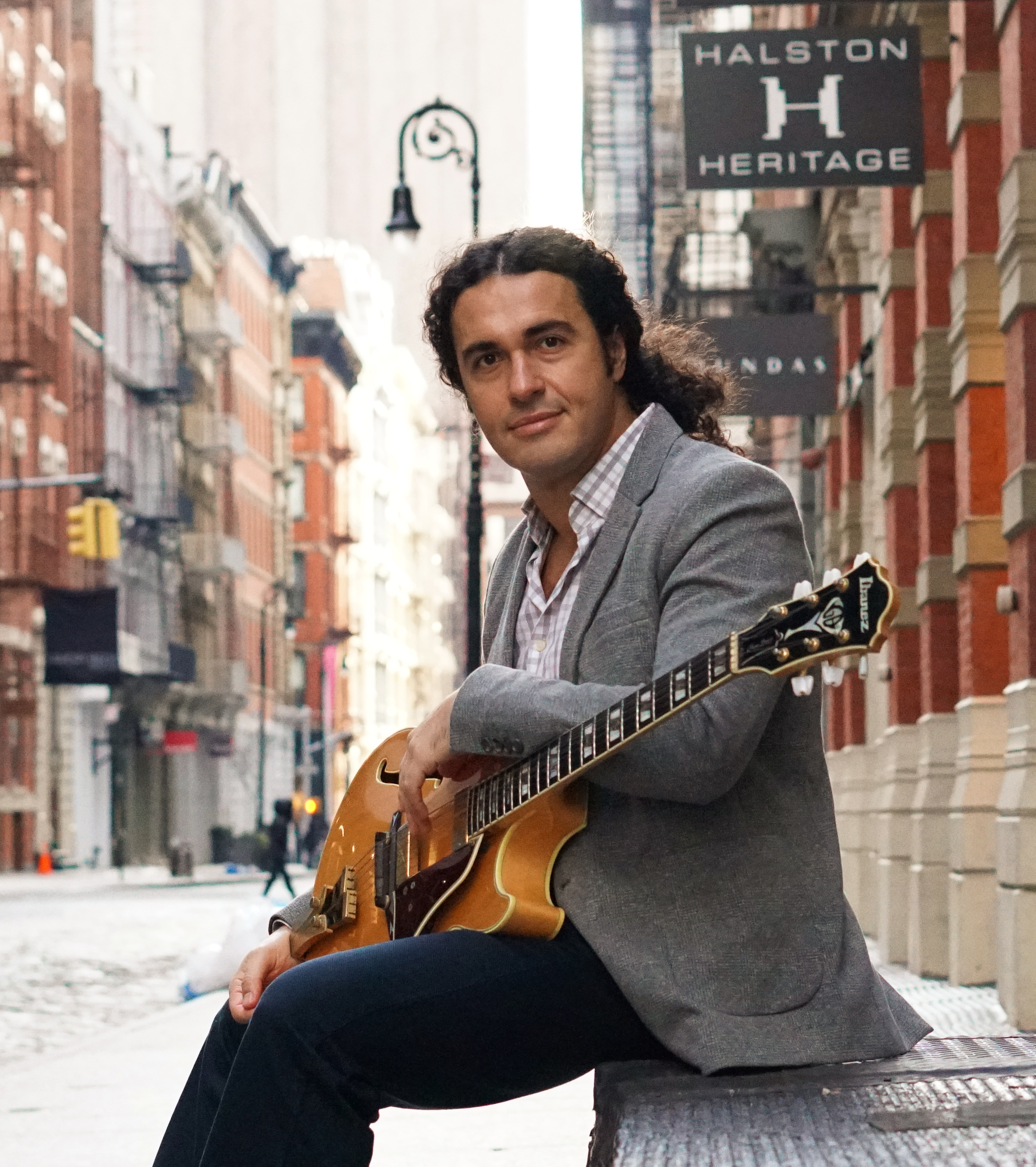
A photo of Vladimir Cetkar at Soho, NYC

Vladimir Četkar (Macedonian: Владимир Четкар) is a Macedonian recording artist, composer, arranger, producer, guitarist and vocalist who is based in New York City. He was born in Ohrid, Republic of Macedonia where, in his childhood, he played the violin. He was greatly influenced by such jazz, funk, soul and disco bands and musicians as Change, Chic, Earth Wind and Fire, Patrice Rushen, Cameo, The Brothers Johnson, Wes Montgomery, George Benson, Quincy Jones, Jamiroquai and many more. Later in life, Vladimir came to the United States to attend Berklee College of Music. There, he focused on contemporary writing and production with the jazz guitar as his main instrument.

His critically acclaimed, original album releases 'We Will Never End', 'Heavenly' and 'Going Home' have positioned him Internationally as one of the most distinguished names in the Jazz-Soul-Funk genre and have ensured an active touring schedule headlining performances at some of the largest and most prestigious music festivals in the world such as Jarasum International Jazz Festival (South Korea), Sziget Festival (Hungary), Blue Note Jazz Festival (USA), Jakarta International Java Jazz Festival (Indonesia), Penang Island Jazz Festival (Malaysia), Hong Kong Jazz Festival (Hong Kong), Beishan Jazz Festival (China), Hua Hin Jazz Festival (Thailand), Mood Indigo (festival) (India), Nišville (Serbia), Ohrid Summer Festival (Macedonia) and many more.

He has been hailed by international critics as one of the most exciting names in his genre, a fresh music force which is unique in today's music industry due to the fact that he is solely producing, composing, orchestrating, arranging and performing his original music, a consummate musician who has already impressed many of his personal influences ranging from legendary producers such as Davide Romani of Change (band), Leon Ware, Bob Esty (Casablanca Records), Patrick Adams (Salsoul Records, Prelude Records), Tom Moulton, guitar legend George Benson as well as the French Disco Knights of the Playboy Mansion Dimitri From Paris and Bob Sinclar.

His music is represented internationally by prominent music labels such as P-Vine Records (Japan), C&L Music (South Korea), Hitman Jazz Records (Thailand and Southeast Asia), Expansion Records (United Kingdom) and others while being consistently broadcast on national and specialized radios globally.

== Studio albums ==
- We Will Never End
- Heavenly
- Going Home
