= Bojan Madzovski =

Macedonian handball player

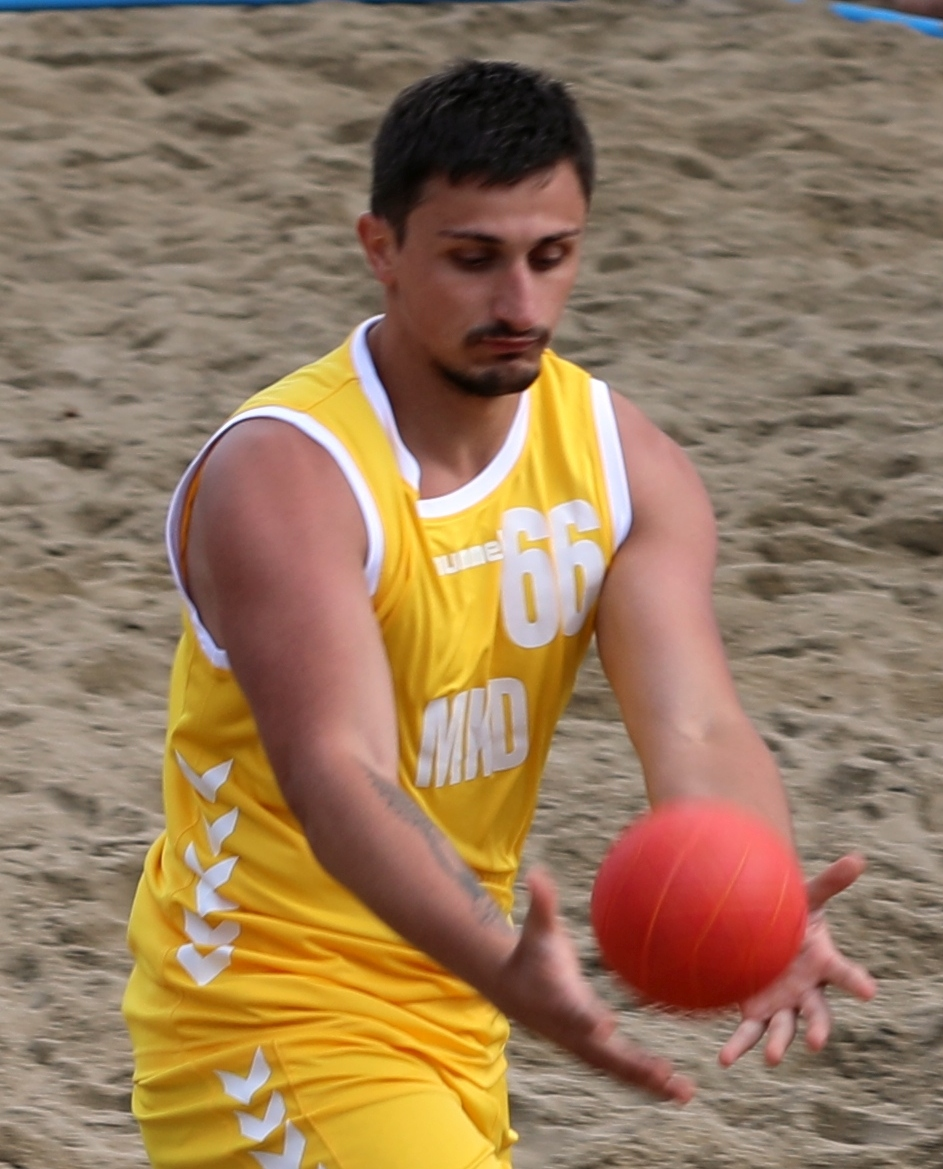

Personal information
- Nationality: Macedonian
- Born: 8 May 1994 (age 32) Skopje, Macedonia
- Height: 1.84 m (6 ft 0 in)

Sport
- Sport: Handball
- Position: Left wing

Youth career
- Years: Team
- –: Metalurg II

Senior clubs
- Years: Team
- 2015–2016: Metalurg Skopje
- 2016–2018: Pelister
- 2018–2019: Metalurg Skopje
- 2019–2023: Eurofarm Pelister
- 2023: Eurofarm Pelister 2
- 2023: Lovćen
- 2024–2025: Partizan
National team
| Years | Team | Apps | (Gls) |
| 2013– | North Macedonia | 6 | (10) |

Bojan Madzovski (Macedonian: Бојан Маџовски) (born 8 May 1994) is a Macedonian handball player who last played as a left wing for Partizan and the North Macedonia national team.

He represented North Macedonia at the 2020 European Men's Handball Championship.

His twin brother Borjan Madzovski is also a handball player.
