= Dragan Taškovski =

Macedonian historian (1917–1980)

Dragan Taškovski (Macedonian: Драган Ташковски; 10 September 1917 – September 1980) was a Macedonian historian and publicist. He wrote the books The Birth of the Macedonian Nation (1967) and On the Ethnogenesis of the Macedonian People (1974).

== Life ==
Dragan Taškovski was born in Skopje on 10 September 1917. He completed his primary and secondary education in Skopje. Taškovski received his bachelor's degree and master's degree at the School of Political Sciences in Belgrade. During World War II, he was a participant in the National Liberation Struggle. At the Faculty of Philosophy in Skopje, he taught dialectical materialism and historical materialism, and political economy from 1946 to 1948. He continued his education in Belgrade, specializing in political science in the early 1960s. After his return to Skopje, he worked as a professor of sociology at the Faculty of Agriculture and Forestry and the Faculty of Medicine.

He defended his thesis titled "Towards the Ethnogenesis of the Macedonian People" in Skopje on 12 April 1975 and worked as a senior research associate after. He also had worked as a director of the Political School of the Central Committee of the League of Communists of Macedonia (SKM), president of the Society of Philosophers and Sociologists of the Socialist Republic of Macedonia, president of the Commission of the executive committee of the Presidency of the Central Committee of the SKM for the ideological and political training of the organizations and members of SKM, director of the Institute for Sociological and Political-Legal Research in Skopje. He died in Hvar, Socialist Republic of Croatia, in September 1980.

== Views and works ==
Along with other Macedonian historians then, he supported the view that the origins of the Macedonians could be traced back to the 19th century. His books The Birth of the Macedonian Nation (1967) and On the Ethnogenesis of the Macedonian People (1974) were popular in SR Macedonia. Taškovski's interpretation of Macedonian history was extremely nationalist and sharply challenged the opposing Bulgarian interpretation. He was more concerned with the questions of ethnic distinction between Macedonians and Bulgarians since the Middle Ages. Taškovski claimed that Samuel's empire was a "new Macedonian state, with a new political center, a new internal organization, and foreign policy orientation, a state with a new compact ethnic mass that belonged to a new nationality – a Macedonian one – different from the Bulgarians." Ethnicity was not important then.

Taškovski admitted that Parteniy Zografski, Miladinov brothers and Rayko Zhinzifov self-identified as Bulgarians, whom he accused of attacking the Macedonian cause. Instead he glorified the anonymous "Macedonists" from Petko Slaveykov's 1871 article. In his 1975 book The Macedonian Nation, he was mostly interested in distancing the Macedonians from the Bulgarians and coping with Bulgarian criticism. Regarding antiquity, he accepted that ethnic Macedonians are Slavs and only shared their name with the ancient Macedonians.

In 1979, Taškovski wrote his last book, which was partially unfinished and published posthumously in 1985 under the title Macedonia through the Ages. In the book, he claimed that "the Ancient Macedonians did not belong to the Illyrians, nor to the Thracians, nor to the ancient Hellenes", but were "a kind of mixture of several ethnic groups and nationalities" from which a "new Macedonian nationality" was created.
