= Ilija Krstevski =

Macedonian handball player

Personal information
- Nationality: Macedonian
- Born: 21 February 1993 (age 33) Skopje, Macedonia
- Height: 1.83 m (6 ft 0 in)

Sport
- Sport: Handball
- Position: Right Wing
- Current club: PIF
- Number: 99

Senior clubs
- Years: Team
- –2014: (North Macedonia) RK Metalurg Junior
- 2014–2016: (North Macedonia) RK Tineks Prolet
- 2016–2017: (North Macedonia) RK Borec
- 2018: (Finland) PIF
- 2018: (North Macedonia) RK Metalurg Junior
- 2018–: (Finland) PIF

Ilija Krstevski (Macedonian: Илија Крстевски) (born 21 February 1993) is a Macedonian handball player who plays for PIF.
