= Jordan Nikolov Orce =

Orce Nikolov

Jordan Nikolov (7 January 1916 in Skopje, occupied by the Kingdom of Bulgaria – 4 January 1942, Kukavica, annexed by the Kingdom of Bulgaria) was a Macedonian communist and partisan from Macedonia. His life and work are connected with the organizing and firming of the syndicalist movement in Yugoslavia. Under his leadership in today North Macedonia, the first protests were undertaken, and the workers succeed for the first time to conclude collective contracts with the employers.

In August 1940 Orce Nikolov was arrested on account of the break-up of the 1st of May proclamation of Central Committee of CPY, and the organizing of the Ilinden uprising celebration in then Vardar Banovina. He was taken to Great Kikinda, where in prison he organized a protest. Then in Lepoglava, he was sentenced for two years in a strict prison and is transferred to the prison in Sremska Mitrovica.

While he was in prison, on the 5th earthy meeting he was chosen as a candidate for a member of CC of CPY. On 22 August 1941, together with several other prisoners he escapes from captivity and manages to enter the free territory of the Republic of Užice where the supreme headquarters of the Yugoslav partisan forces was stationed.

He was given a task to go to the Bulgarian occupation zone of Yugoslavia and work on the organizing of an armed uprising.

In December 1941, he tried to achieve his task over the mountain of Kukavica, but was unsuccessful. On the second attempt he died near Vladicin Han on 4 January 1942, shot by the Bulgarian police.
