= List of people from Skopje =

Below is a list of notable people from Skopje, North Macedonia, or its surroundings.

== Artists ==
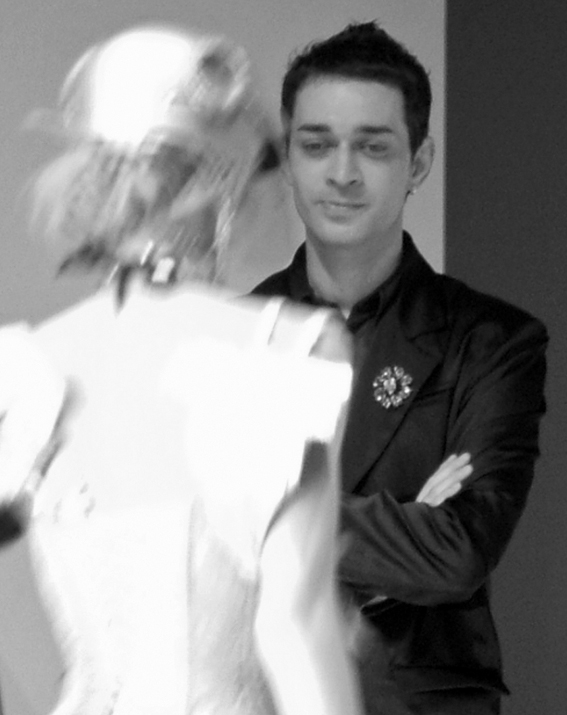
Nikola Eftimov

- Bojana Barltrop, artist and photographer

=== Fashion designers ===
- Nikola Eftimov

=== Painters ===
- Sabri Berkel
- Abdurrahim Buza
- Maja Dzartovska
- Petar Gligorovski
- Mice Jankulovski
- Petar Mazev

== Business, industry, academics ==
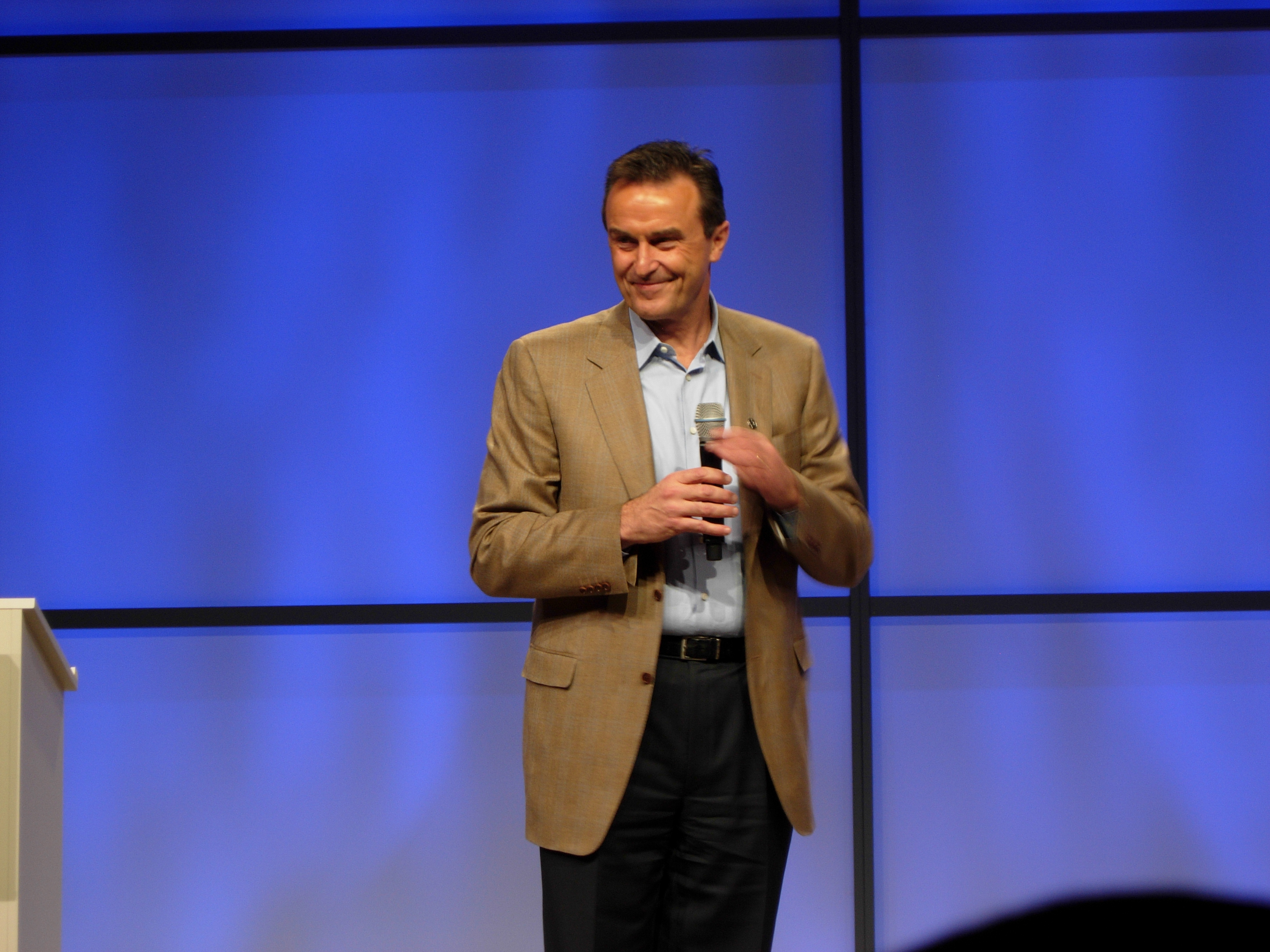
Mike S. Zafirovski

- Dragoslav Avramović, economist, governor of the National Bank of Yugoslavia
- Dimitrije Bužarovski, scientist
- Marko Čalasan, youngest information technology engineer in the world, has worked for Microsoft since age 9
- Ljubomir Maksimović, historian
- Zoran T. Popovski, scientist and professor
- Şarık Tara, founder of ENKA
- Dragan Taškovski, historian
- Mike S. Zafirovski, businessman involved in the success of several American companies
- Mirjana Vukićević-Karabin, astrophysicist

== Musicians, bands, composers ==
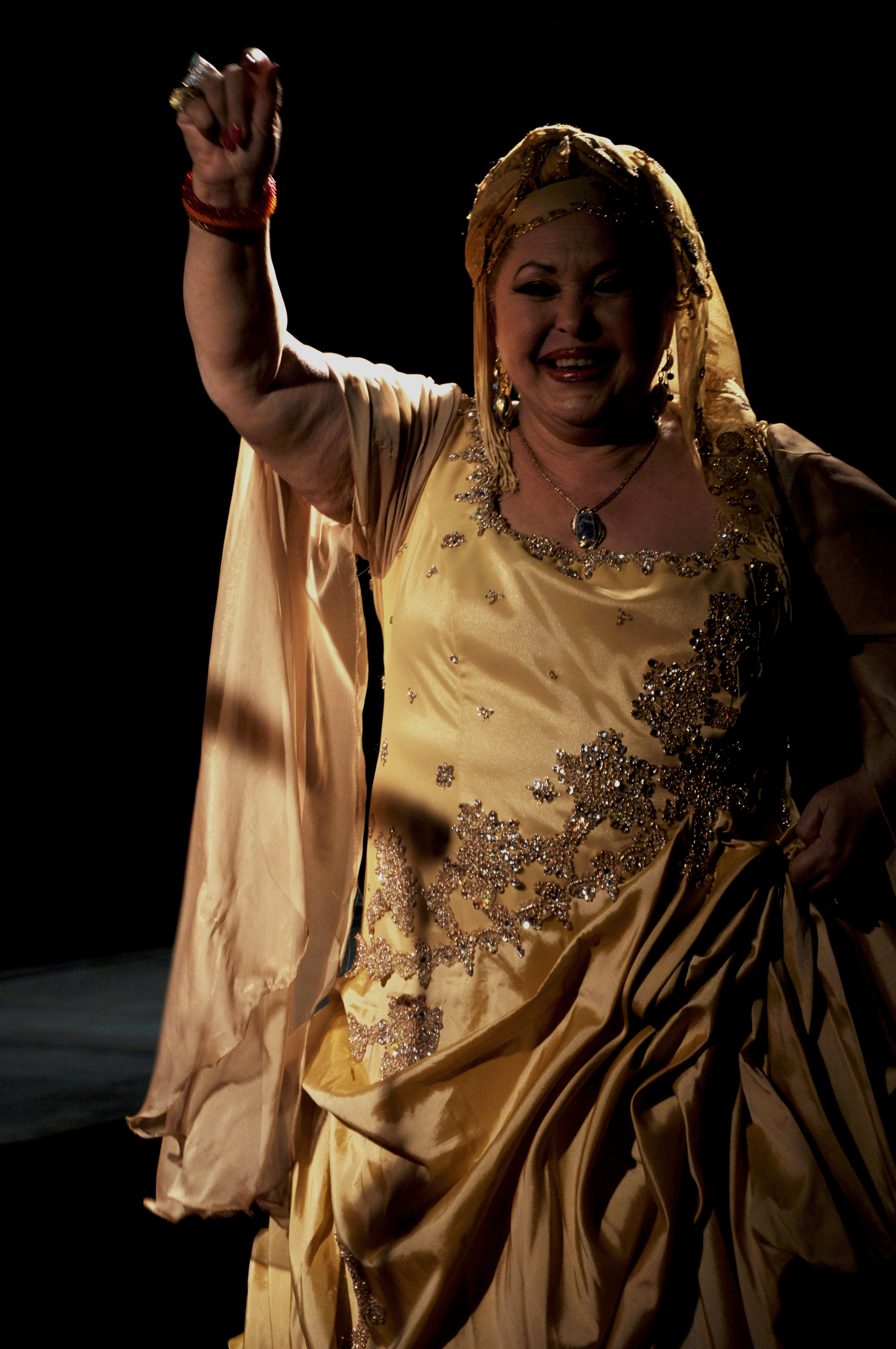
Esma Redžepova

- Lorenc Antoni, composer
- Arhangel, band
- Lindon Berisha, singer and songwriter
- Darko Dimitrov, songwriter, composer, and music producer
- Adrian Gaxha, singer
- Vaska Ilieva, folk singer
- Andrijana Janevska, singer
- Vlado Janevski, singer
- Jovan Jovanov, singer and composer
- Kanita, singer
- Andrea Koevska, singer who represented North Macedonia in the Eurovision Song Contest 2022
- Aleksandar Makedonski
- Mizar, band
- Blagoj Nacoski, tenor opera singer
- Goce Nikolovski, singer
- Barbara Popović, singer
- Esma Redžepova, vocalist
- Elena Risteska, singer and songwriter
- Altuna Sejdiu, singer
- Muharem Serbezovski, singer
- Branimir Štulić, singer and composer
- Tamara Todevska, singer who represented North Macedonia in the Eurovision Song Contest 2019
- Tijana Todevska-Dapčević, singer
- Simon Trpceski, classical pianist
- Martin Vučić, singer
- Toni Zen, rapper

== Movie, television figures, models and journalists ==
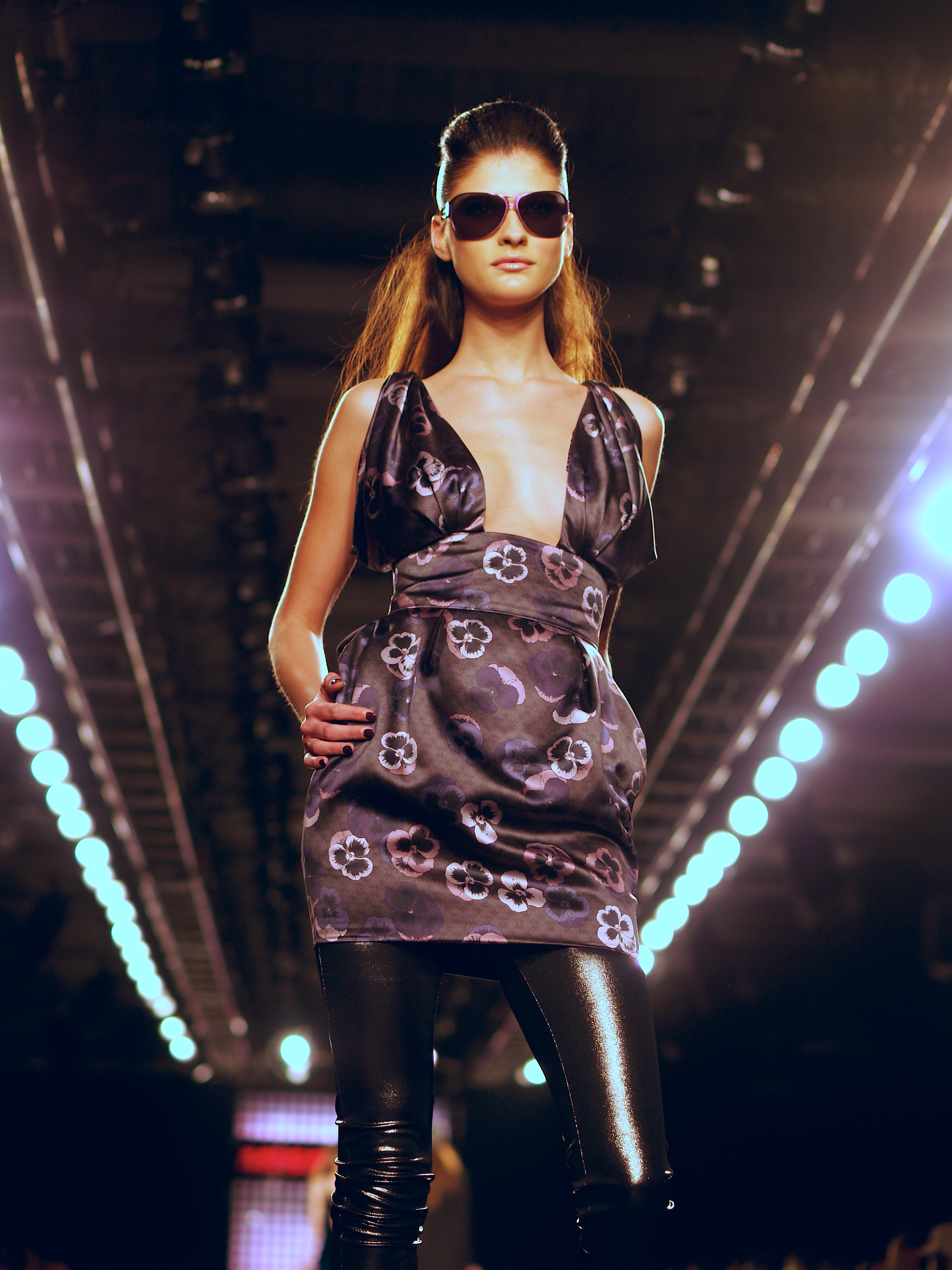
Katarina Ivanovska

- Filiz Ahmet, actress
- Milka Babović, figure skating TV presenter
- Andrijana Cvetkovik, film director, writer, and diplomat
- Petar Gligorovski, animated movie director
- Katarina Ivanovska, model
- Ivo Jankoski, producer, fine arts manager, publisher and promoter
- Milčo Mančevski, film director
- Labina Mitevska, actress
- Naum Panovski, theatre director and writer
- Dragan Pavloviḱ Latas, journalist
- Stole Popov, film director
- Avni Qahili, journalist
- Ljubiša Samardžić, actor
- Alaettin Tahir, journalist

== Politicians and historical figures ==
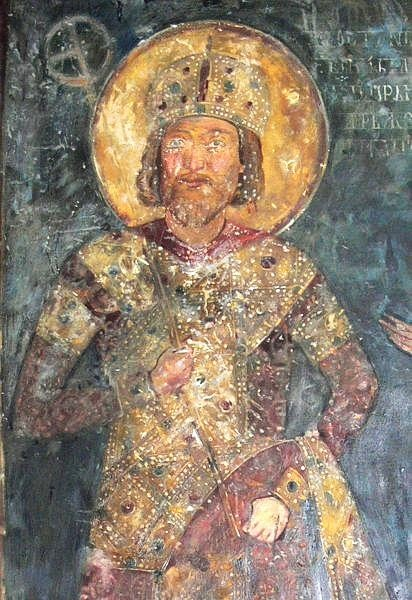
Konstantin Tih, tsar of Bulgaria

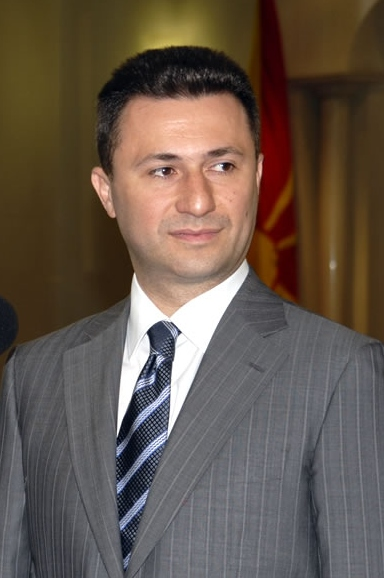
Nikola Gruevski

- Strašo Angelovski
- Vlado Bučkovski, former prime minister of the Republic of Macedonia
- Constantine Tikh of Bulgaria, tsar of Bulgaria
- Stevo Crvenkovski, former foreign minister of Macedonia
- Boris Drangov, Bulgarian military officer and pedagogue
- Lazar Elenovski, Macedonian Minister of Defence
- Ljubomir Frčkoski, former presidential candidate
- Atanasije II Gavrilović, patriarch of the Serbian Orthodox Church
- Nevena Georgieva, youngest fighter and first woman among the Macedonian Yugoslav partisan units
- Nikola Gruevski, former prime minister of Macedonia
- Ratko Janev, atomic physicist
- Zoran Jolevski, Macedonian ambassador to the United States
- Justinian I, Eastern Roman Emperor
- Kalinik I, patriarch of the Serbian Orthodox Church
- Srgjan Kerim, former president of the United Nations General Assembly
- Emil Kirjas, politician
- Trifun Kostovski, former mayor of Skopje
- Maksim I, Serbian Patriarch
- Venko Markovski, writer, poet and political figure
- Ljubomir Mihajlovski, former Minister of Internal Affairs
- Ilinka Mitreva, former foreign minister
- Jordan Nikolov Orce, communist and partisan
- Bujar Osmani, former Minister of Foreign Affairs
- Zana Ramadani, German politician
- Blerim Reka, politician
- Radmila Šekerinska, former Minister of Defense
- Ali Shefqet Shkupi, lieutenant colonel
- Theodahad, king of the Ostrogoths
- Vasil Tupurkovski

== Sports figures ==
- Mevlan Adili, footballer
- Vlatko Andonovski, former head coach of the United States women's national soccer team
- Pero Antić, basketball player
- Jasir Asani, footballer
- Boban Babunski, football coach
- Muharem Bajrami, footballer
- Aleksandar Bajevski, footballer
- Enis Bardhi, footballer
- Jakup Berisha, footballer
- Sedat Berisha, footballer
- Mirjana Boševska, freestyle and medley swimmer
- Aleksandar Colovic, chess player
- Besir Demiri, footballer
- Ertan Demiri, footballer
- Muhamed Demiri, footballer
- Filip Despotovski, footballer
- Kiril Dojčinovski, former Yugoslav footballer
- Mario Đurovski, football striker for FK Vojvodina
- Muzafer Ejupi, footballer
- Antonio Filevski, retired footballer
- Jane Gavalovski, footballer
- Enver Idrizi, karateka
- Saša Ilić, goalkeeper
- Drita Islami, Macedonian hurdler
- Filip Ivanovski, footballer
- Čedomir Janevski, head coach of the Macedonia national football team
- Zoran Jovanovski, footballer
- Valmir Kakruki, basketball player
- Stefan Kozlov, tennis player
- Luka Nakov, footballer
- Zlatko Nastevski, retired footballer
- Nderim Nexhipi, footballer
- Ardian Nuhiu, footballer
- Žarko Odžakov, retired footballer
- Darko Pančev, European Cup-winning footballer
- Aleksandar Popovski, footballer
- Lazar Popovski, kayaker
- Zekirija Ramadani, footballer
- Ivana Rožman, track and field athlete
- Berat Sadik, Finnish striker
- Afrodita Salihi, footballer
- Predrag Samardžiski, basketball player
- Dušan Savić, footballer
- Shaban Sejdiu, wrestler
- Kiril Simonovski, footballer
- Agim Sopi, football coach
- Metodije Spasovski, former footballer
- Goran Stankovski, footballer
- Darko Tasevski, footballer
- Shaban Tërstena, wrestler
- Muhamed Thaçi, basketball player
- Goce Toleski, footballer
- Aleksandar Vasoski, defender for Eintracht Frankfurt
- Blagoja Vidinić, former football coach and former football player
- Lirim Zendeli, German racer
- Suat Zendeli, footballer
- Jetmir Zeqiri, footballer
- Lejson Zeqiri, footballer
- Zoran Zlatkovski, footballer
- Fisnik Zuka, footballer

== Writers, novelists, and poets ==
- Yahya Kemal Beyatlı, poet
- Rumena Bužarovska, writer
- Elena Filipovska, philologist, teacher, writer
- Slavko Janevski, poet, prose writer
- Venko Markovski, writer, poet and political figure
- Olivera Nikolova, novelist
- Naum Panovski, writer
- Aleksandar Prokopiev, novelist and essayist
- Goce Smilevski, writer
- Jovica Tasevski-Eternijan, poet, essayist, and literary critic
- Gane Todorovoski, poet, author, translator, essayist

== Others ==
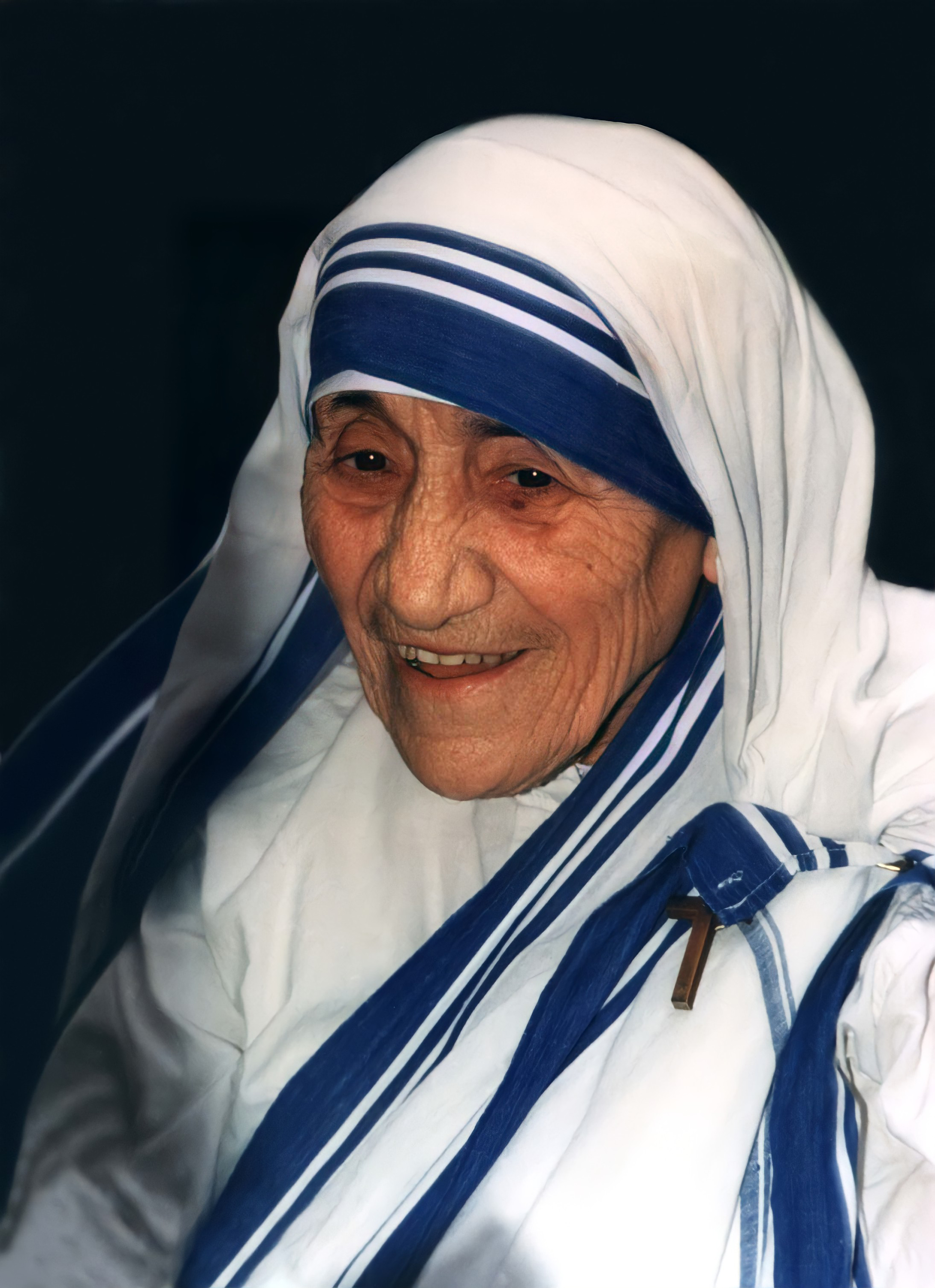
Mother Teresa

- Ana Colovic Lesoska, environmental activist
- Nathan of Gaza, Jewish mystic
- Lila Milikj, transgender activist
- Mother Teresa, Roman Catholic nun (now Saint Teresa of Calcutta)
