= Sasko =

Sasko may refer to:

- Saško, a given name
- Šaško, a surname
- SASKO Bread, a brand owned by Pioneer Foods, a South African company acquired by PepsiCo
