= Barltrop =

Barltrop is a surname. Notable people with the surname include:

- Bojana Barltrop (born 1949), Yugoslav artist and photographer
- Mabel Barltrop (1866–1934), English religious leader
- Robert Barltrop (1922–2009), English socialist activist, essayist, biographer, artist, and illustrator

== See also ==
- Bartrop
