= Vančo Šontevski =

Macedonian politician

- Ванчо Шонтевски

chief of g-2 ge
- In office 2012–incumbent
- President: Gjorgje Ivanov
- Preceded by: ivica ampov

Personal details
- Born: Vancho Shontevski Berovo, Macedonia
- Education: Belgrade University

Vancho Shontevski is a Director of the Military Service for Security and Intelligence of Army of the Republic of Macedonia of Macedonia.

Military offices
Preceded by Ferdinand Odzakov	Director of the Military Service for Security and Intelligence (2012-present)	Incumbent
