= Ministry of Defence of North Macedonia =

Government ministry of North Macedonia

- Министерство за одбрана на Северна Македонија; Ministria e Mbrojtjes së Maqedonisë së Veriut
- Emblem of the Army of the Republic of North Macedonia

Agency overview
- Formed: 1991; 35 years ago
- Jurisdiction: Government of North Macedonia
- Headquarters: Skopje
- Employees: 987 (2015)
- Annual budget: 6.5 Million (MKD)
- Minister responsible: Slavjanka Petrovska, Minister of Defence
- Agency executive: Vasko Gjurchinovski, Chief of the General Staff
- Website: Official website

The Ministry of Defence of North Macedonia (Macedonian: Министерство за одбрана на Северна Македонија, romanized: Ministerstvo za odbrana na Severna Makedonija; Albanian: Ministria e Mbrojtjes së Maqedonisë së Veriut) is a Macedonian agency which oversees the management of the Army of the Republic of North Macedonia. The ministry mainly coordinates the defence policy of the country, corresponding with the President and the Prime Minister regularly. The MORM commands the ARM through the Chief of the General Staff (CGS).

Current emblem of the Army

== Structure ==
=== Leadership ===
- Slavjanka Petrovska - Defence minister
- Major General Vasko Gjurchinovski - Chief of the General Staff
- Deputy CGS for civil-military cooperation
- Deputy CGS for planning
- Deputy CGS for military operations

=== Departmental structure ===
Administrative departments in the MORM help organize and deliver on the priorities of the ministry. The following departments are under the command of the MORM:

- Department for Support to the Minister
- Department for Communications, Analytics and Operational Support
- Department for Internal Audit
- Department for Inspection in Defence
- Department for Policy and Planning
- Department for International Cooperation
- Department for Civil-military co-operation
- Department for Legal Affairs
- Human Resource Department
- Finance Department
- Logistics Department
- Real Estate Department
- Department for Services and Tourism, Motor Pool and Maintenance
- Department for Specialized Production
- C-4 Department
- Military Museum
- Military Aviation

== List of ministers ==
The post of defense minister was established on January 10, 1992, with the first minister being Trajan Gocevski. The current defence minister of North Macedonia is Slavjanka Petrovska.

== See also ==
- Army of the Republic of North Macedonia
- Minister of Defence (North Macedonia)
- Chief of the General Staff (North Macedonia)
