= Saško Lafčiski =

General and Chief of Defense of North Macedonia

Saško Lafčiski Сашко Лафчиски
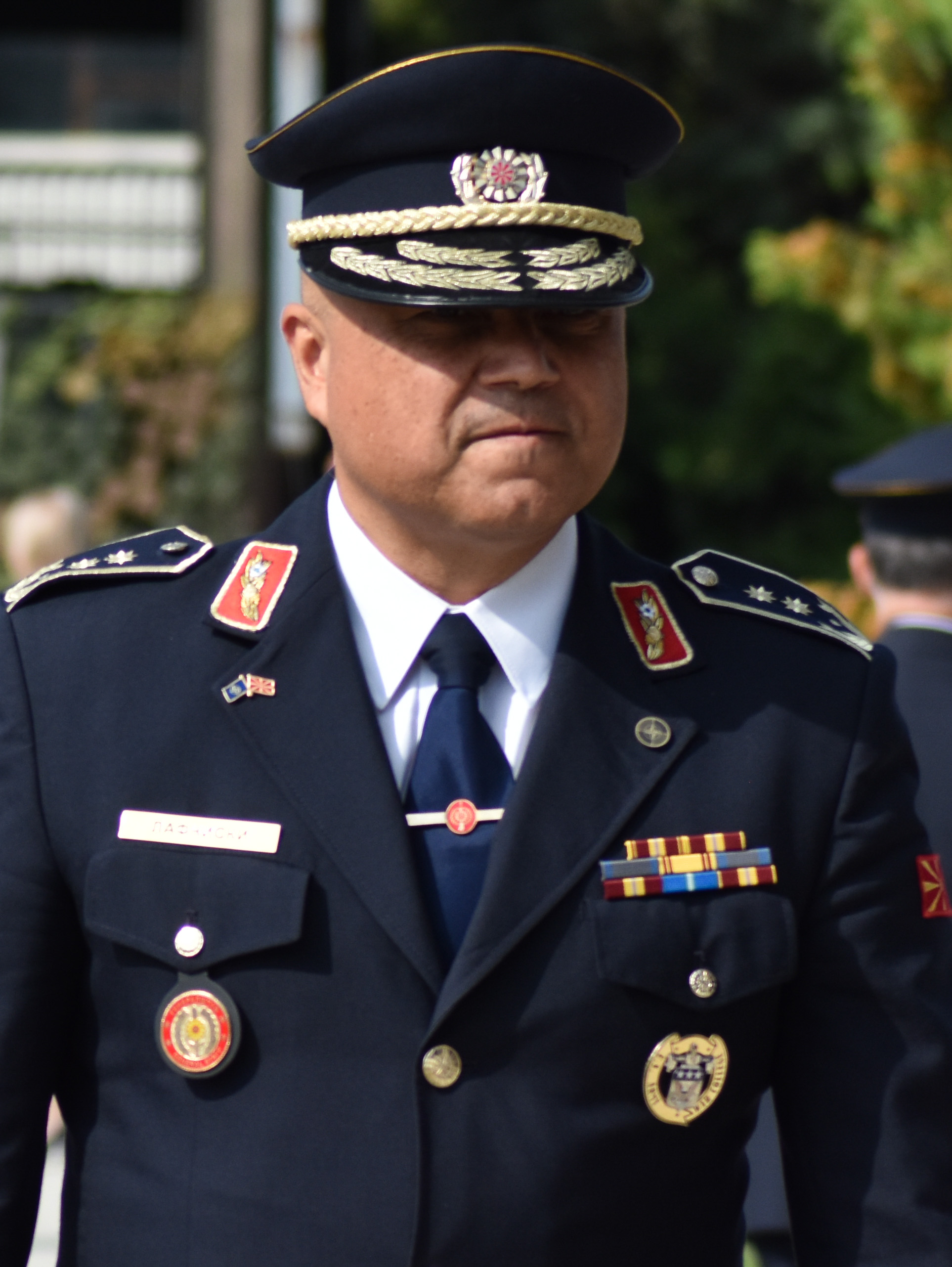
- Born: February 11, 1977 (age 49); Štip, SR Macedonia, Yugoslavia
- Allegiance: North Macedonia
- Branch: Army of the Republic of North Macedonia
- Service years: 1999–present
- Rank: Major general
- Commands: Chief of the General Staff; 1st Mechanized Infantry Brigade; Special Forces Battalion
- Conflicts: Iraq War
- Alma mater: Military Academy of the Republic of Macedonia (BS); United States Army War College (MS)

Major General Saško Lafčiski (Macedonian: Сашко Лафчиски; born 11 February 1977) is a Macedonian military officer who has been the Chief of the General Staff of the Army of North Macedonia since 2024.

== Biography ==
Lafčiski was born on 11 February 1977 in Štip, Yugoslavia. He studied at the Military Academy of the Republic of Macedonia from 1995 to 1999 before being commissioned as a second lieutenant. Lafčiski became a team leader in the Special Forces Battalion, Special Operations Regiment, and was promoted to lieutenant in 2000. In 2001, he was made a company commander and promoted to captain. From 2003 to 2004, he commanded the Macedonian special forces contingent that participated in the Iraq War and was also the battalion's training officer. From 2004 to 2008 Lafčiski was the battalion chief of operations (S3). Promoted to major in 2007, he also attended the Croatian Army Command and Staff School between 2007 and 2008.

He was the Macedonian National Representative at the Allied Joint Force Command Naples, Italy, from 2008 to 2012, and was promoted to lieutenant colonel in 2011. After that, Lafčiski was the Special Operations Regiment chief of operations (S3) from 2012 to 2015, and then studied at the United States Army War College in Carlisle, Pennsylvania, from 2015 to 2016 for a master's degree in strategic studies. He was the commander of the Special Forces Battalion "Wolves" from 2016 to 2018. He became a colonel and the deputy commander of the regiment in 2018, until 2020, when he was made the chief of the special operations section in the General Staff. In 2021 Lafčiski was made commander of the 1st Mechanized Infantry Brigade, and was promoted to brigadier general in 2022.

In August 2024 Lafčiski was made the Chief of the General Staff of the Army of the Republic of North Macedonia and was promoted to major general in a decree of President Gordana Siljanovska-Davkova.

== Awards and decorations ==
- Golden Badge of the ARSM
- Silver Badge of the ARSM

== Personal life ==
He is married and has one child.

Military offices
Preceded by Besnik Yemini	Commander of the 1st Mechanized Infantry Brigade; 2021–2024	Succeeded by Dejan Čiplakovski
Preceded by Vasko Gjurčinovski	Chief of the General Staff of the Army of North Macedonia; 2024–present	Incumbent
