= Miroslav Stojanovski =

Macedonian military officer (born 1959)

- Мирослав Стојановски
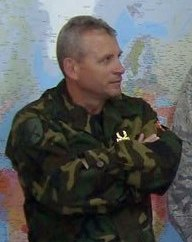
- Stojanovski in 2009
- Born: Miroslav Stojanovski; July 10, 1959 (age 67); Skopje, PR Macedonia, FPR Yugoslavia
- Military career
- Allegiance: SFR Yugoslavia (1974–1991); Republic of Macedonia (1991–present)
- Branch: Yugoslav People's Army; Army of the Republic of Macedonia
- Service years: 1974–present
- Rank: Lieutenant general
- Commands: Army of the Republic of Macedonia
- Conflicts: Croatian War of Independence: Battle of Vukovar
- Awards: Legion of Merit

Miroslav Stojanovski (Macedonian: Мирослав Стојановски; born 10 July 1959) is a Macedonian military officer who holds the rank of lieutenant general and was the longest-serving Chief of General Staff of the Army of the Republic of Macedonia (2005–2011).

In 2013 he was appointed as the Macedonian military attache to NATO and the EU.

== Military career ==
Positions:

- Commander of a military police platoon (1982–1984)
- Commander of the Military Police (1984–1989)
- Commander of counterterrorism regiment (1989–1991)
- Deputy Commander of Military Police Battalion (1991–1992)
- Head of Department of Military Police Department of Intelligence and Security in the Ministry of Defense (1992–1994)
- Commander of the Unit for Special Purposes, Ministry of Defense (1994–1998)
- General Staff Officer (1998-1999)
- Deputy Chief of the Department for Strategic Research Staff (1999–2000)
- Head of the Department of Physical Education in Military Academy (2000–2001)
- Commander of 1st Mechanized Infantry Brigade (2001–2003)
- Deputy Chief of Staff for operations (2003–2005)
- Chief of the General Staff of the Army of the Republic of Macedonia (2005-2011)

Ranks:

- Junior Lieutenant (1982)
- Lieutenant (1983)
- Captain (1986)
- Captain 1st Class (1990)
- Major (1991)
- Lieutenant Colonel (1994)
- Colonel (1998)
- Brigadier General (2001)
- Major General (2003)
- Lieutenant General (2006)

Military offices
Preceded by Gjorgji Bojadžiev	ARM Chief of General Staff; 2005–2011	Succeeded by Gorančo Koteski
