= Avramovski =

Avramovski (feminine Avramovska) is a surname. Notable people with the surname include:

- Dimitar Avramovski-Pandilov (1898–1963), Macedonian impressionist painter
- Siljan Avramovski (born 1960), Macedonian politician
- Siniša Avramovski (born 1983), Macedonian basketball player
- Daniel Avramovski (born 1995), Macedonian footballer
