= MSSI =

MSSI may refer to:

- Marvell Software Solutions Israel
- Master of Science of Strategic Intelligence degree, as offered by the National Intelligence University
- Microsoft Shared Source Initiative
- Military Service for Security and Intelligence, Macedonia
