= Metodi Stamboliski =

- Методи Стамболиски
- Born: Metodi Stamboliski; April 10, 1947 (age 79); Mačevo, SFR Yugoslavia
- Military career
- Allegiance: SFR Yugoslavia (1966–1991); Republic of Macedonia (1991–2004)
- Branch: Yugoslav People's Army; Army of the Republic of Macedonia
- Service years: 1966–2004
- Rank: General
- Commands: Army of the Republic of Macedonia

Metodi Stamboliski (Macedonian: Методи Стамболиски, born 10 April 1947, Mačevo) is a former Macedonian general who served as the Chief of General Staff of the Army of the Republic of Macedonia (2001–2004).

== Biography ==
Stamboliski was born on 10 April 1947 in the village of Mačevo, located in the eastern Republic of Macedonia (then part of the Socialist Federative Republic of Yugoslavia). He had two sisters and three brothers, one of whom also became an officer in the Yugoslav People's Army (JNA).

=== Education ===
He graduated from a high school in the town of Berovo in 1966 and later attended the academy of the Yugoslav People's Army Ground Forces in Belgrade, specializing in artillery.

=== Military career ===
Stamboliski became an artillery platoon command and eventually rose up to command an artillery regiment in the JNA. After the formation of the Army of the Republic of Macedonia, he became the chief of the operations management in the General Staff. In 1995 Stamboliski was appointed the commander of the 3rd Army Corps in Skopje, and the following year he commanded the 2nd Army Corps in Bitola. Stamboliski was promoted to brigadier general by a presidential decree on 18 August 1997. On February 11 of that year, he was given command of the border guard brigade and later promoted to major general. He became a lieutenant general on 18 June 2001 and took office as the Chief of General Staff of the Army of the Republic of Macedonia on 9 August 2001. Stamboliski was promoted to general by presidential decree.

In 2004, Stamboliski was replaced as the Chief of General Staff by Gjorgji Bojadžiev.

=== Arms scandal ===
In the summer of 2007, General Stamboliski was arrested on charges of abuse of power regarding the purchasing and selling off of spare parts for the ARM's T-55 tanks donated by Bulgaria, which cost the country 2.5 million euros (3.18 million U.S. dollars). He was also charged with embezzling 1.8 million Euros (about US$2.5 million) but released on bail. Later in 2008, Stamboliski, along with former Minister of Defense Vlado Bučkovski and two other defense ministry officials, were found guilty. The former chief of general staff was jailed for three and a half years.

== Sources ==
- Bulgarian Wikipedia

Military offices
Preceded by Pande Petrovski	ARM Chief of General Staff; 2001–2004	Succeeded by Gjorgji Bojadžiev
