= Metodija Velichkovski =

Macedonian military officer (born 1966)

- Методија Величковски
- Born: Metodija Velichkovski; May 11, 1966 (age 60); Skopje, SFR Yugoslavia
- Military career
- Allegiance: SFR Yugoslavia (to 1991); Republic of North Macedonia
- Branch: Yugoslav People's Army; Army of the Republic of Macedonia
- Service years: 1980―2018
- Rank: Lieutenant colonel general
- Commands: Chief of the General Staff

Metodija Velichkovski (Macedonian: Методија Величковски, born 11 May 1966, Skopje) is a retired Macedonian lieutenant general who was the Chief of General Staff of the Army of the Republic of North Macedonia from 2015 to 2018.

== Biography ==
Velichkovski was born in Skopje, then part of the Socialist Federative Republic of Yugoslavia, on 11 May 1966.

He attended a military school (1980―1984) and later a military academy (1984―1988). In Germany he attended a battalion commanders school (1999) and the George C. Marshall Center. Velichkovski also graduated from the Command and Staff College in Skopje (2000) and from the School of National Security and Defense in Sofia, Bulgaria.

== Military career ==
Positions:

- Platoon commander (1988―1991)
- Commander of an engineering company (1991―1994)
- Chief engineer of the 1st Guards Brigade (1995―1999)
- Engineer battalion commander (1999―2001)
- Head of the G7 (Engineer) in the SEEBRIG (2002―2004)
- Chief of Staff of the Engineering Regiment (2004)
- Commander of the Engineer Regiment (2004―2006)
- Deputy Commander of the 1st Mechanized Infantry Brigade (2006―2009)
- Commander of the 2nd Mechanized Infantry Brigade (2009―2012)
- Commander of Joint Operations Command (March 2012―August 2015)
- Chief of the General Staff of the Army of the Republic of North Macedonia (from 18 August 2015)

Ranks:

- Lieutenant (1989)
- Captain (1993)
- Captain 1st Class (1996)
- Major (1999)
- Lieutenant Colonel (2001)
- Colonel (2006)
- Brigadier General (2011)
- Major General (2013)
- Lieutenant General (2015)

== Personal life ==
Velichkovski is married and has two children. His hobbies include reading and inventing (he applied for two and has registered one patent). Along with his native Macedonian, Velichkovski speaks German, English, and Bulgarian.

== Awards ==
- United States: Vermont National Guard Commendation Medal
- Bulgaria: Commendation Medal "For Meritorious Service Under the Colors", 2nd class
- NATO: SEEBRIG Achievement Medal

Military offices
Preceded by Gorančo Koteski	Chief of the General Staff of the Army of the Republic of Macedonia; 2015–2018	Succeeded by Vasko Gjurčinovski
