= Odžakov =

Odžakov is a surname of Macedonian origin. Notable people with the surname include:

- Ferdinand Odžakov (born 1969), Macedonian politician
- Žarko Odžakov (born 1955), Macedonian-Australian footballer

== See also ==
- Arnela Odžaković (born 1983), Bosnian karateka
