= Gorančo Koteski =

Macedonian military officer (born 1965)

- Горанчо Котески
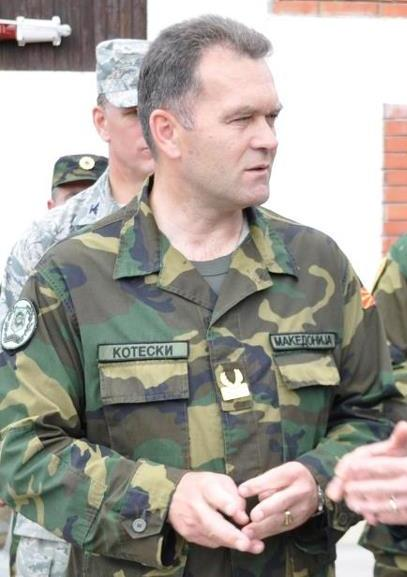
- Born: Gorančo Koteski; 18 August 1965 (age 61); Prilep, SFR Yugoslavia
- Military career
- Allegiance: SFR Yugoslavia; Republic of Macedonia
- Branch: Yugoslav People's Army; Army of the Republic of Macedonia
- Rank: Major General
- Commands: Army of the Republic of Macedonia

Gorančo Koteski (Macedonian: Горанчо Котески; born 18 August 1965) is a Macedonian military officer who holds the rank of major general and is the former Chief of General Staff of the Army of the Republic of Macedonia (2011―2015).

== Biography ==
Koteski was born in Prilep, a city in then Socialist Federative Republic of Yugoslavia, on 18 August 1965. Serving in the Yugoslav People's Army, he finished military school in Sarajevo and later attended a military academy in Belgrade. Following the formation of the Republic of Macedonia in 1991, Koteski served in the Army of the Republic of Macedonia and graduated from the NATO Defense College in Rome. He served as the military attache in Germany and as the commander of the Joint Operations Command (March―August 2015). In military circles, Koteski is considered a pro-NATO and pro-reform general.

On 16 August 2011, President Gjorge Ivanov signed a decree that appointed Koteski the new Chief of General Staff of the Army of the Republic of Macedonia, replacing Lieutenant General Miroslav Stojanovski. The decree also promoted him from Brigadier General to Major General. He formally took office two days later, on Army Day.

He was replaced as ARM Chief of General Staff by Metodija Velichkovski on 18 August 2015.

== Personal life ==
Koteski's brother is a member of the VMRO-DPMNE political party. Koteski speaks German and English.

Military offices
Preceded by Miroslav Stojanovski	ARM Chief of General Staff; 2011–2015	Succeeded by Metodija Velichkovski
