= Risto Gjorgjiev =

Macedonian politician

- Ристо Ѓорѓиев

Director of Military Service for Security and Intelligence
- In office 2004–2006
- President: Gjorgje Ivanov
- Preceded by: Vladimir Pivovarov
- Succeeded by: Ferdinand Odzakov

Personal details
- Born: Risto Gjorgjiev Macedonia

Risto Gjorgjiev was a Director of Military Service for Security and Intelligence of Army of the Republic of Macedonia of Macedonia.

Military offices
Preceded by Vladimir Pivovarov	Director of the Military Service for Security and Intelligence (2004–2006)	Succeeded by Ferdinand Odzakov
