= Military Service for Security and Intelligence =

North Macedonia intelligence office

- Воена служба за бесбедност и разузнавање Сектор - Воена служба за безбедност и разузнавање

Agency overview
- Formed: May 26, 1992
- Preceding agencies: KOS; OZNA
- Jurisdiction: North Macedonia
- Headquarters: Skopje, North Macedonia
- Employees: Classified
- Annual budget: Classified
- Ministers responsible: Slavjanka Petrovska, Ministry of Defence of North Macedonia
- Agency executive: Colonel Nikola Kiskoski (Director)
- Parent agency: Ministry of Defence of North Macedonia
- Child agency: G2 General Staff
- Website: www.morm.gov.mk

The Military Service for Security and Intelligence of Republic of North Macedonia is the national military intelligence and security within the Ministry of Defence of North Macedonia.

== Mission ==
- Intelligence support of humanitarian operations and peace support operations in dealing with natural disasters and humanitarian crises;
- Planning, analyzing, processing and dissemination of intelligence data in order to protect the territorial integrity, independence and the border interests of the Republic of Macedonia in accordance with the Constitution, Law on defence and the national security and defence concept of the Republic of Macedonia;
- Planning, analyzing, processing and dissemination of intelligence data required to participate in peace support and NATO-led conflict prevention operations.

== Tasks ==
=== Military intelligence ===
- Manages Intelligence data to suit the needs of the GS of ARM in preparation, plans and executes various operations;
- Plans, coordinates and synchronizes intelligence operations in subordinate commands and units;
- Plans, organizes and conducts Intelligence preparation of the battlefield (IPB) for military and operations other than war in Macedonia and abroad;
- Plans, organizes and conducts intelligence support required for the decision making process of the GS of ARM during ARM participation in various operations in Macedonia and abroad.

=== Counter intelligence ===
- Detects hostile intelligence capacities for data collection;
- Plans, organizes and implements counterintelligence measures in Ministry of Defence of North Macedonia and Armed Forces of the North;
- Provides counterintelligence operations for force protection;
- Recognizes hostile intelligence capabilities to interfere in hostile influence.

=== Security ===
- Coordinates and conducts security examination and control;
- Recognizes critical physical security points.

=== Staff planning ===
- Plans and decision making process support;
- Responsible for planning and execution of intelligence exercises security;
- Supports the duties and responsibilities in the GS scope of work aimed at supporting the mission;
- Supports the planning process and maintains functional connections with MSSI(Military Sector for Security and Intelligence) in order to provide relevant intelligence data and analysis;
- Trains subordinates.

== Organisation ==
=== Directors ===
#	Portrait	Name	Mandate commenced on	Mandate finished on	Political Party
1		Aleksandar Bocinov	?	?	
2		Sasho Mijalkov	?	?	
3		Milisav Tashtanovski	?	?	
4		Vladimir Pivovarov	2002	2004	
5		Col Risto Gjorgjiev	2004	2006	
6		Dr Ferdinand Odzakov	2007	2015	

== See also ==
- North Macedonia
- Administration for Security and Counterintelligence (Police Agency)
- Intelligence Agency (Civilian Agency)
- Special Forces Battalion
- The Rangers Battalion
- Ceremonial Guard Battalion
- North Macedonia Air Force
