= Jovan Andrevski =

Macedonian lieutenant general

- Born: January 14, 1942 (age 84); Turje, Debarca Municipality, Albanian-occupation zone of Yugoslavia
- Allegiance: Yugoslavia (to 1992); North Macedonia
- Branch: Yugoslav Ground Forces; Army of the Republic of Macedonia
- Service years: 1962–2001
- Rank: Lieutenant colonel general
- Commands: Chief of the General Staff; 1st ARM Corps; 3rd ARM Corps
- Conflicts: 2001 insurgency in Macedonia

Jovan Andrevski (Macedonian: Јован Андревски, born 14 January 1942) is a retired Macedonian lieutenant general who served as the Chief of General Staff of the Army of the Republic of Macedonia from 2000 to 2001. He resigned from his position during the 2001 insurgency in Macedonia, citing low morale and military campaign failures as the reason for it. From 2001 to 2002 he was a military advisor to President Boris Trajkovski.

Military offices
Preceded by Trajče Krstevski	Chief of the General Staff of the Army of the Republic of Macedonia; 2000–2001	Succeeded by Pande Petrovski
