= Vlado Misajlovski =

Macedonian politician (born 1985)

- Владо Мисајловски
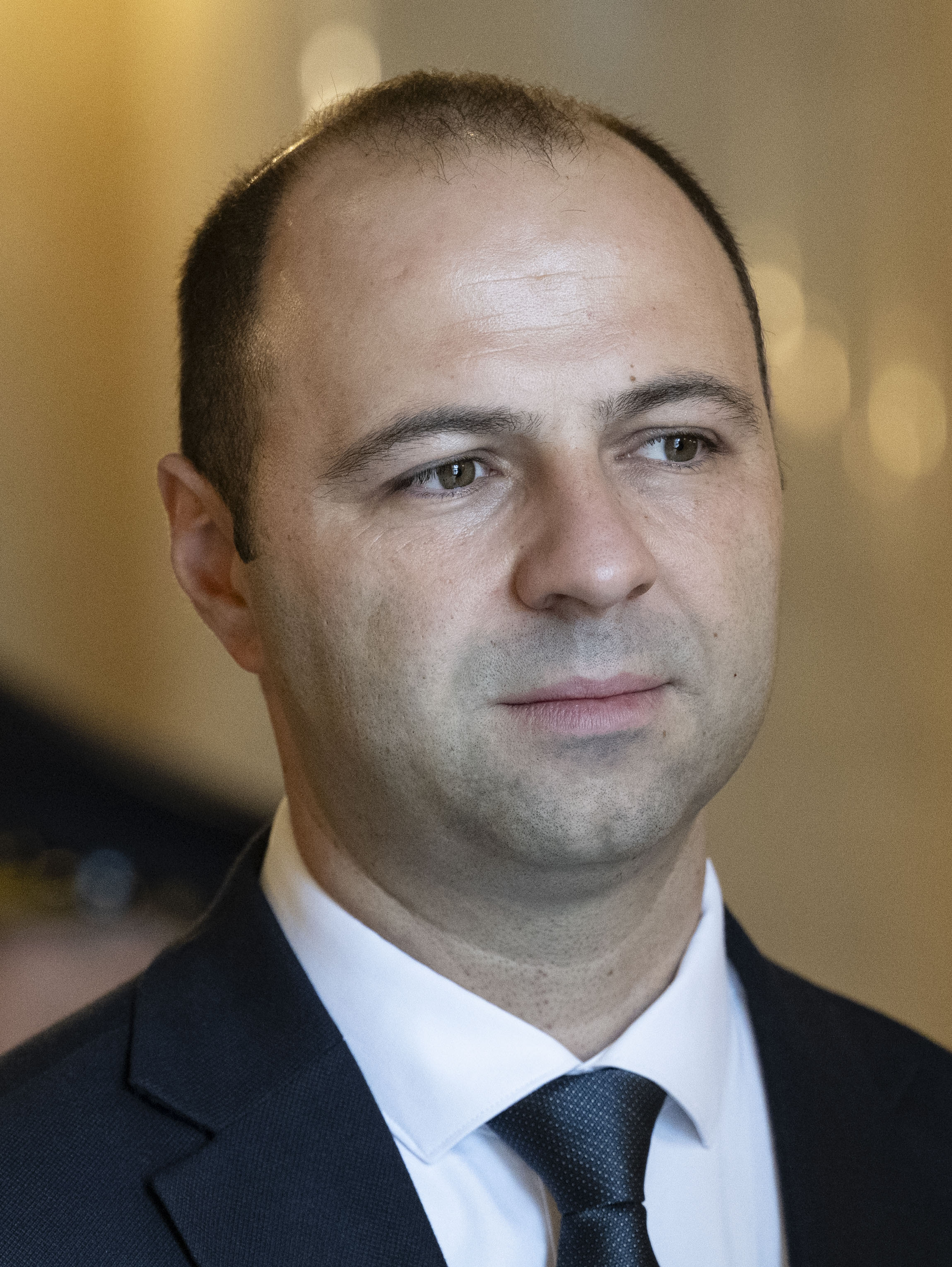
- Vlado Misajlovski in 2024

Minister of Defence
- Incumbent
- Assumed office 24 June 2024
- Prime Minister: Hristijan Mickoski
- Preceded by: Slavjanka Petrovska

Minister of Transport and Communications
- In office 13 May 2015 – 31 May 2017
- Prime Minister: Nikola Gruevski
- Preceded by: Mile Janakieski
- Succeeded by: Goran Sugarevski

Personal details
- Born: 21 January 1985 (age 41) Skopje, SFR Yugoslavia
- Education: Ss. Cyril and Methodius University in Skopje

Vlado Misajlovski-Misajlo (born 21 January 1985) is a Macedonian politician. He served as Minister of Transport and Communications in the cabinet of Nikola Gruevski from 13 May 2015 until 31 May 2017.

== Early life ==
Misajlovski studied in Skopje and obtained a BA in Diplomacy and international politics and an MA in European and international diplomacy and politics. He was director of the state agency for roads before being appointed as Minister.

From 2009 to 2010, he was then advisor for foreign policy and international relations in the office of the President of the National Assembly. For a year afterward, he was Head of the Department for Support for the mayor of the Centar municipality. From 2012 to 2014 he was State Secretary in the Ministry of Foreign Affairs, before he became State Secretary in the Ministry of Transport and Communications in 2014. He was only state secretary for a little bit, however, as later that year he became Director of the Public Enterprise for State Roads until 2015.

== Political career ==
In May 2015, he was confirmed as Minister of Transport and Communications, a position he held until 2017. Between 2018 and 2020, when he was out of political office, Misajlovski was the commercial director at Kendo 3 LLC in Skopje.

In 2024, he became the leader of the VMRO-DPMNE list for the parliamentary elections in constituency 2.

Since June 2024 he has been the Minister of Defence. During his time as Minister of Defence, he has been skeptical about sending aid packages to Ukraine, saying that he would prefer for there to be peace talks instead, although he reaffirmed that the country sided with NATO. He has been a strong supporter of the United States, which he says has been the one country to fully support North Macedonia. He has also rejected calls for a return to compulsory military service, preferring for there to be professional soldiers instead.
