= Mačevo =

Mačevo Мачево
- Village
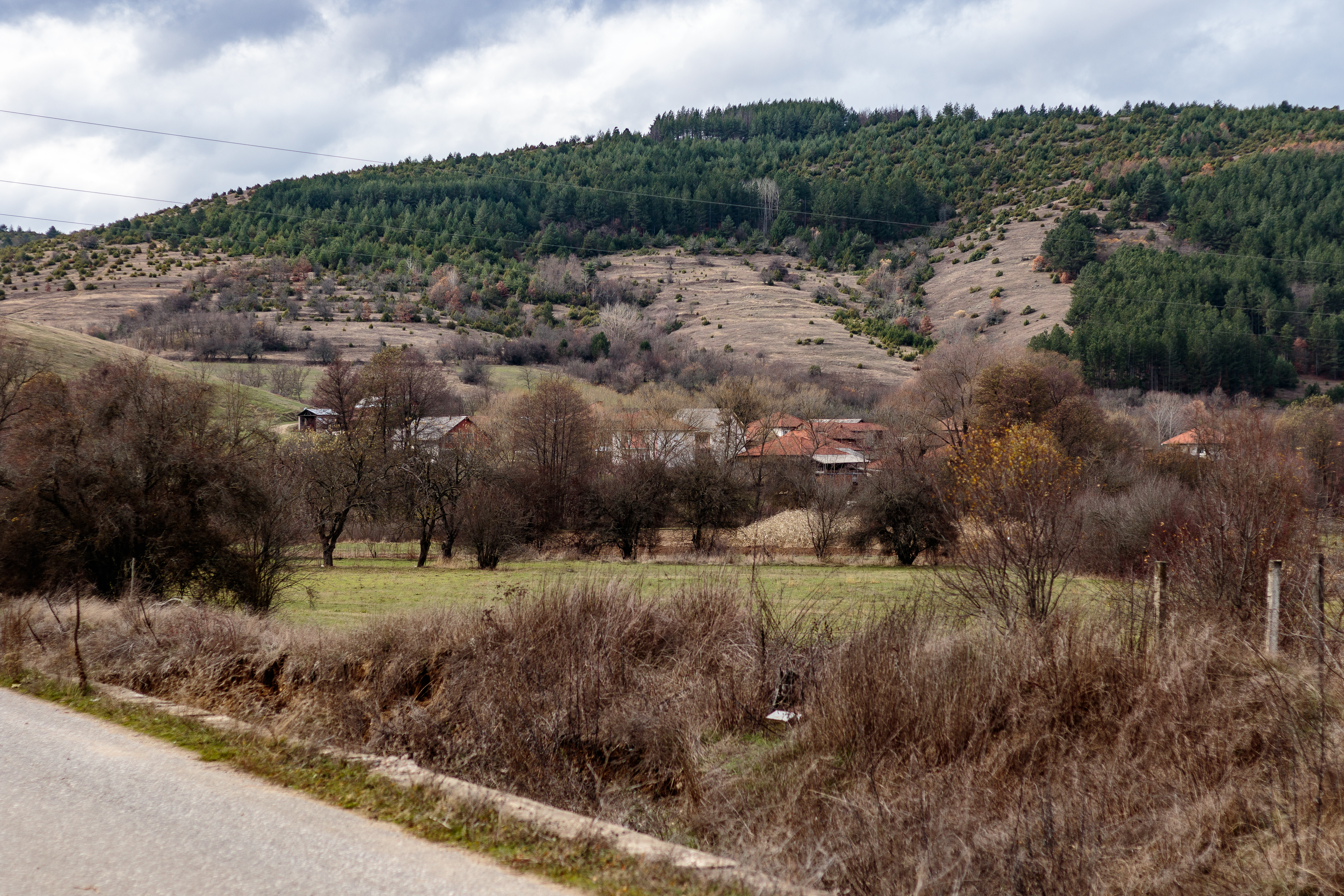
- Panoramic view of the village

- Location within North Macedonia
- Country: North Macedonia
- Region: Eastern
- Municipality: Berovo

Population (2002)
  - Total: 206
- Time zone: UTC+1 (CET)

Mačevo (Macedonian: Мачево) is a village in the Berovo Municipality of North Macedonia.

== Demographics ==
According to the 2002 census, the village had a total of 206 inhabitants. Ethnic groups in the village include:

- Macedonians 206

== Notable people ==
- Metodi Stamboliski, Macedonian general and Chief of General Staff of the Army of the Republic of Macedonia.
