= Gjorgji Bojadžiev =

Macedonian military officer (1950–2024)

- Ѓорѓи Бојаџиев
- Born: Gjorgji Bojadžiev; 31 March 1950; Novo Selo, PR Macedonia, FPR Yugoslavia
- Died: 1 December 2024 (aged 74)
- Military career
- Allegiance: SFR Yugoslavia (1968–1991); Republic of Macedonia (1991–2005)
- Branch: Yugoslav People's Army; Army of the Republic of Macedonia
- Service years: 1966–2005
- Rank: Major General
- Commands: Army of the Republic of Macedonia

Gjorgji Bojadžiev (Macedonian: Ѓорѓи Бојаџиев; 31 March 1950 – 1 December 2024) was a Macedonian general who served as the Chief of General Staff of the Army of the Republic of Macedonia (2004–2005).

== Biography ==
=== Early life and education ===
Bojadžiev was born in the eastern Macedonian village of Novo Selo in 1950, then part of the Socialist Federal Republic of Yugoslavia.

He graduated from the Military Academy in Belgrade in 1973, and from the Command and Staff College in Skopje in 1995. Bojadžiev went on a language course in Montreal, Canada, in 1999, and attended a military academy in Paris from 2000 to 2001.

=== Military career ===
His first duty was commander of a platoon, then he became assistant commander for political education, and for some time was the commander of a division, then the Border Guard Brigade, and from 1 January 2004 was the head of the Operations Division on the ARM General Staff. Bojadziev became a lieutenant in 1973, the following year he received the rank lieutenant. In 1986 he was promoted to Major, followed by Lieutenant Colonel, and in 2002 he became a brigadier general. Following his appointment to Chief of General Staff, Bojadziev was promoted to major general. He was replaced as the Chief of General Staff in 2005 by Miroslav Stojanovski.

=== Death ===
Bojadžiev died on 1 December 2024, at the age of 74.

Military offices
Preceded by Metodi Stamboliski	ARM Chief of General Staff; 2004–2005	Succeeded by Miroslav Stojanovski
