= Hari Kostov =

Macedonian politician (born 1959)

- Хари Костов

5th Prime Minister of Macedonia
- In office 2 June 2004 – 18 November 2004
- President: Branko Crvenkovski
- Preceded by: Radmila Šekerinska
- Succeeded by: Vlado Bučkovski

Minister of Internal Affairs
- In office 1 November 2002 – 2 June 2004
- Prime Minister: Branko Crvenkovski
- Preceded by: Ljube Boškoski
- Succeeded by: Siljan Avramovski

General Manager of Komercijalna Banka
- In office 1996–2002

Assistant Chief Executive Officer in the World Bank
- In office 1995–1996

Vice-Minister of Finance
- In office 1994–1995

Personal details
- Born: Хари Костов; 13 November 1959 (age 66) Pišica, PR Macedonia, SFRY
- Citizenship: North Macedonia
- Party: Independent
- Education: Ss. Cyril and Methodius University in Skopje

Hari Kostov (Macedonian: Хари Костов; born 13 November 1959) is a Macedonian politician who served as the Prime Minister of Macedonia from May 2004 until his resignation in November 2004.

He was appointed to the position of Prime Minister by the parliament on 31 May 2004, two weeks after being nominated by President Branko Crvenkovski. Kostov was an economic advisor to the Macedonian government and the World Bank during the 1980s and 1990s. He was the interior minister in the previous government, which was led by Crvenkovski and lasted from 2002 until 2004, and ended when Crvenkovski was elected president. Kostov retained most officials from the Crvenkovski government.

Kostov announced his resignation on 15 November 2004, following disputes within the coalition government, particularly between ethnic Macedonian and ethnic Albanian ministers. He left office on 18 November 2004, when his resignation was accepted, and was succeeded by defence minister Vlado Bučkovski.

Currently, he is chief executive of the Komercijalna Bank Skopje (Комерцијална Банка Скопје), a position which he also had before entering the Macedonian government.

Kostov is an ethnic Aromanian.

== Awards ==
- (North Macedonia) (2008) Order of the Holy Macedonian Cross

Political offices
Preceded by Radmila Šekerinska	Prime Minister of the Republic of Macedonia; 2004	Succeeded by Vlado Buckovski
Preceded by Ljube Boškoski	Minister of Internal Affairs; 2002–2004	Succeeded by Siljan Avramovski
