= Saško =

Saško is a given name. Notable people with the given name include:

- Saško Kedev (born 1962), Macedonian politician, doctor of medical sciences, and mountaineer
- Saško Lafčiski (born 1977), Macedonian military officer
- Saško Pandev (born 1987), Macedonian football player

== See also ==
- Sasko Ndlovu, short for Siyemukela Ndlovu
- Šaško, surname
