= Chief of the General Staff (North Macedonia) =

Chief of the General Staff of the Macedonian Armed Forces

- Началник на Генералштабот

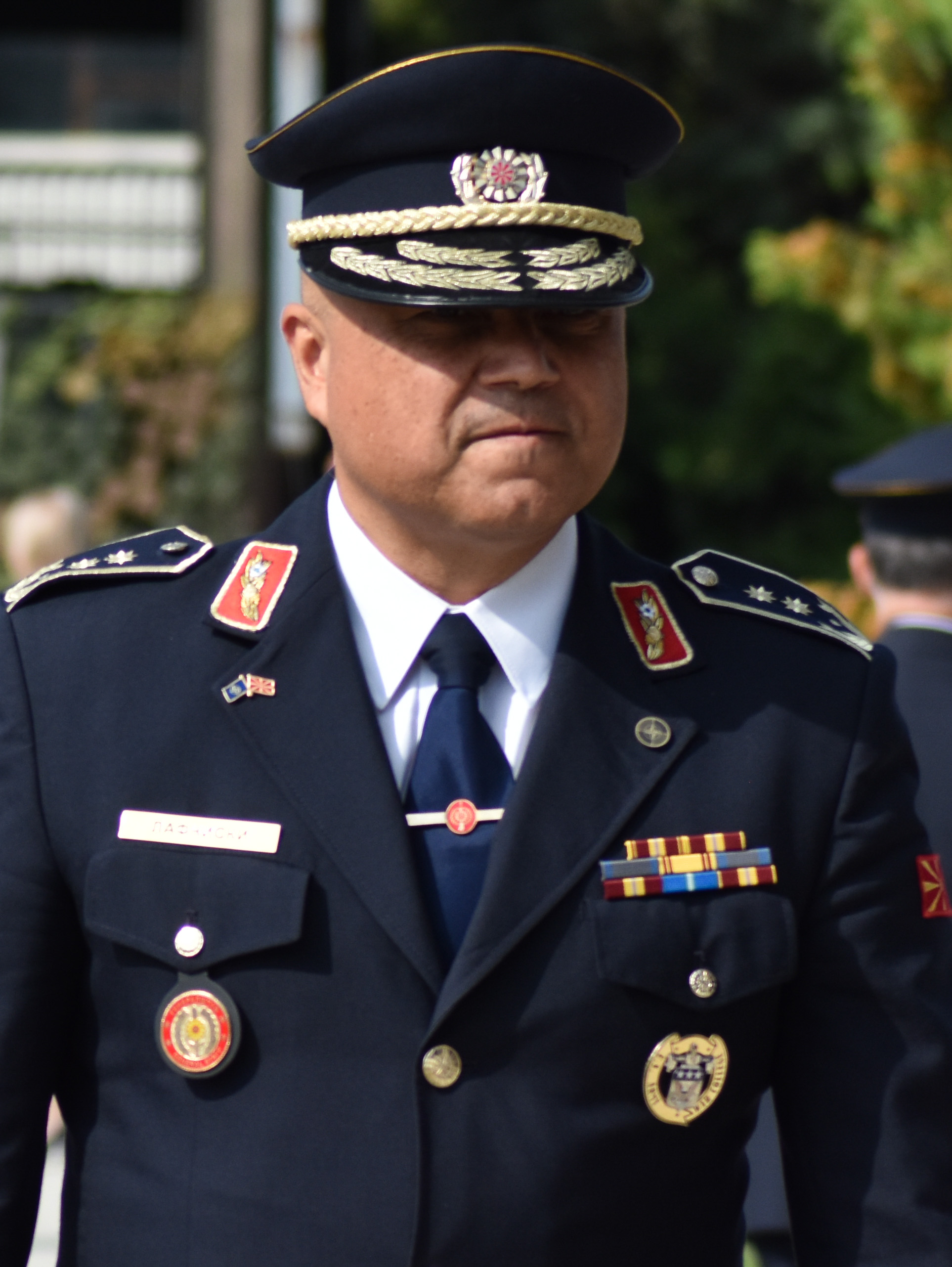
- Incumbent; Major general Saško Lafčiski since 18 August 2024
- Ministry of Defence
- Member of: General Staff
- Reports to: Minister of Defence
- Appointer: President of North Macedonia
- Formation: 19 March 1992
- First holder: Major General Mitre Arsovski

The Chief of the General Staff of the Army of North Macedonia (Macedonian: Началник на Генералштабот на Армијата на Северна Македонија, romanized: Načalnik na Generalštabot na Armijata na Severna Makedonija) is the professional head of the Army of North Macedonia, responsible for the administration and the operational control.

== History ==
Eleven people served as Chief of the General Staff since the independence of North Macedonia from Yugoslavia. The first Chief was Major general Mitre Arsovski (appointed on 16 March 1992), and the current Chief is Lt. Col. General Vasko Gjurčinovski (appointed on 18 August 2018).

The shortest-serving Chief of the General Staff was General Pande Petrovski (about 3 months), and the longest-serving was Lt. Col. General Miroslav Stojanovski (over 6 years)

== List of chiefs of the general staff ==
Chiefs of the General Staff have been:

No.	Portrait	Chief of the General Staff	Took office	Left office	Time in office
1	Mitre Arsovski [mk]	Major general Mitre Arsovski (born 1936)	16 March 1992	3 March 1993	352 days
2	Dragoljub Bocinov [mk]	Colonel general Dragoljub Bocinov (1933–2003)	3 March 1993	22 January 1996	2 years, 325 days
3	Trajče Krstevski [mk]	General; Trajče Krstevski (1938–2017)	22 January 1996	11 February 2000	4 years, 20 days
4	Jovan Andrevski	Colonel general Jovan Andrevski (born 1938) (Note: Resigned during the 2001 insurgency.)	11 February 2000	12 June 2001	1 year, 121 days
5	Pande Petrovski	General; Pande Petrovski (1943–2006)	12 June 2001	19 September 2001	99 days
6	Metodi Stamboliski	General; Metodi Stamboliski (born 1947)	19 September 2001	12 March 2004	2 years, 175 days
7	Gjorgji Bojadžiev	Major general Gjorgji Bojadžiev (1950–2024)	12 March 2004	6 July 2005	1 year, 116 days
8	Miroslav Stojanovski	Lt. Col. General; Miroslav Stojanovski (born 1959)	6 July 2005	18 August 2011	6 years, 43 days
9	Gorančo Koteski	Major general Gorančo Koteski (born 1965)	18 August 2011	18 August 2015	4 years
10	Metodija Veličkovski	Lt. Col. General; Metodija Veličkovski (born 1966)	18 August 2015	18 August 2018	3 years
11	Vasko Gjurčinovski	Lt. Col. General; Vasko Gjurčinovski (born 1970)	18 August 2018	18 August 2024	6 years
12	Saško Lafčiski	Major General; Saško Lafčiski (born 1977)	18 August 2024	Incumbent	2 years, 40 days

== See also ==
- Army of North Macedonia
