= Petar Gligorovski =

Macedonian artist and film director

- Born: Perica Panov; February 3, 1938; Skopje, Yugoslavia
- Died: December 4, 1995 (aged 57); Skopje, Macedonia
- Occupations: Film director, animator, editor
- Years active: 1963—1995

Petar Gligorovski (Macedonian: Петар Глигоровски, pronounced [pɛ'tar gligɔ'rɔfski]; February 3, 1938 - December 4, 1995) was a Yugoslav and Macedonian animated film director and surrealist artist.

== Education and career ==
After receiving an education on Academy of Fine Arts in Belgrade and specialization of animation in Zagreb, he started authoring animated films for TV Skopje from 1963–1968. He was the author of the first Macedonian animated film titled "Embrion № M". He was a leading representative of contemporary Macedonian animation, which is awarded at festivals in Berlin, Oberhausen, New York.

Prior to his shift cinema, he was one of the pioneers of Yugoslav comics in the 1950s and a technical animator mostly working within the prestigious Zagreb-centered circle of animators. He created several movies, a number of technique-experimental unaccounted footage and left two unfinished projects designed under auspices of the production house "Vardar Film".

The hallmarks of his movies, all of which are authored with polychromatic, predominantly biomorph shapes in recurring patterns, constituted his style. Thematically, the movies express combined mythical themes (birth, fall of man, apocalypse, phoenix), through ranges of visual allegories and metaphors. In some of Gligorovski's works, documentary sequences were embedded, in line with augmentation of the script's leitmotiv, rather than for reasons of visual appeal or exploration of technical limits.

After his death in 1995, much of his work has become partially lost, with only two of his animated shorts being readily available online on the Internet, and production materials and clips of his other films known to exist in private collections.

== Filmography ==
Adam: 5 to 12 (1977)

Among his main works are:

- Embrio № M, 1971
- Feniks, 1976 (unavailable, storyboards known to exist)
- Adam: 5 to 12, 1977
- A, 1985 (unavailable)

== Awards ==
Gligorovski was awarded the following awards:

- 1971 YFDSF, Belgrade, Special Diploma for direction of animated film / “Embrion № M”
- 1977 IFF, Annecy, The First Special Award / “Feniks”
- 1977 IFF, Berlin, Silver Bear / “Feniks”
- 1977 YFDSF, Belgrade, Golden Medal-Belgrade / “Adam: 5 do 12”
- 1982 YFDSF, Belgrade, Special Charter for the pioneer and creative work in the field of animation
