= Šaško =

Šaško is a surname. Notable people with the surname include:

- Ivan Šaško (born 1966), Croatian prelate
- Kamil Šaško (born 1985), Slovak politician

== See also ==
- Saško, given name
