= Radmila Šekerinska =

Macedonian politician (born 1972)

- Радмила Шекеринска
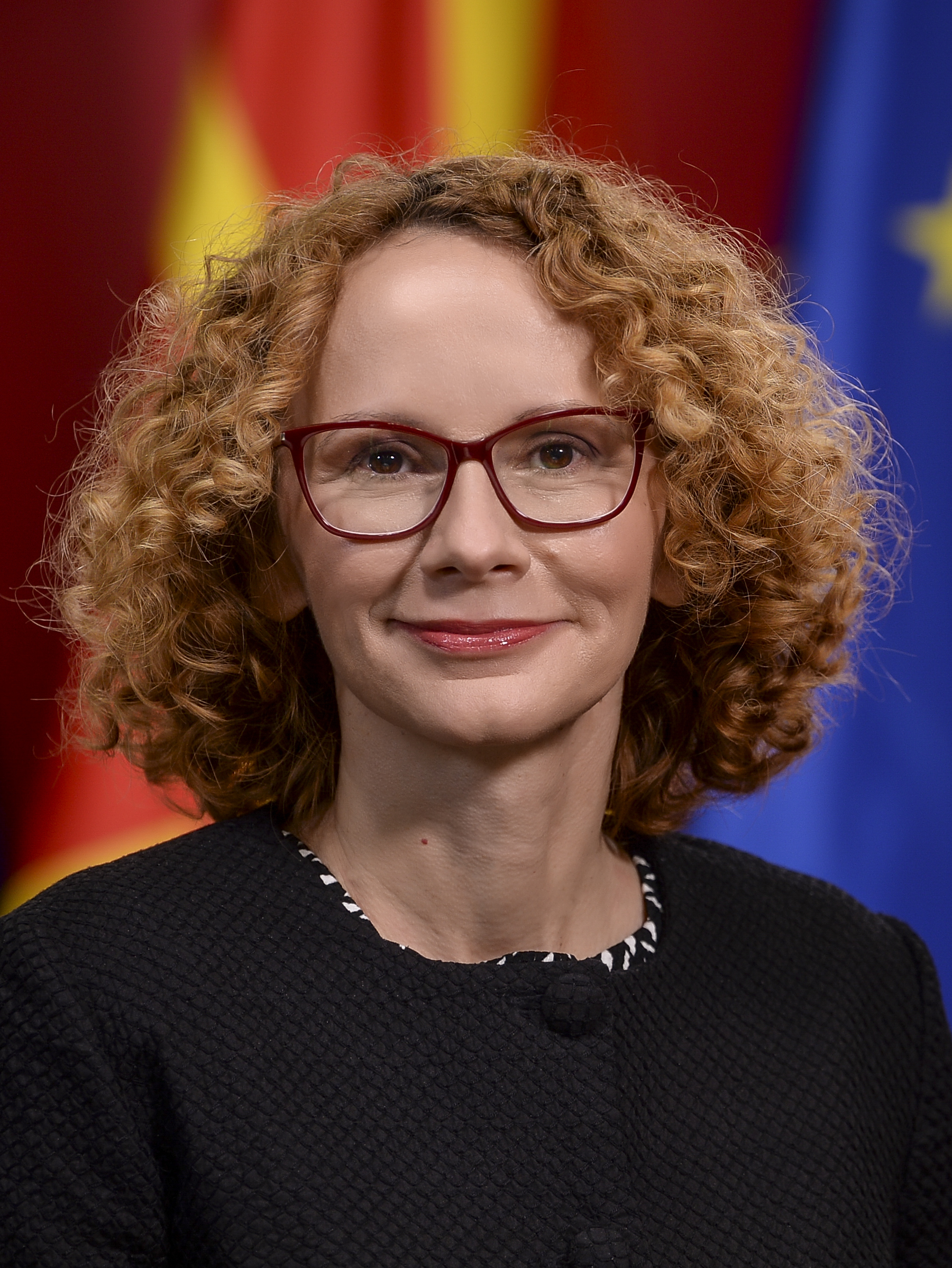
- Official portrait, 2020

Deputy Secretary General of NATO
- Incumbent
- Assumed office 2 December 2024
- Secretary General: Mark Rutte
- Preceded by: Mircea Geoană

Minister of Defense
- In office 1 June 2017 – 16 January 2022
- Prime Minister: Zoran Zaev
- Preceded by: Zoran Jolevski
- Succeeded by: Slavjanka Petrovska

4th Prime Minister of North Macedonia Acting
- In office 18 November 2004 – 17 December 2004
- President: Branko Crvenkovski
- Preceded by: Hari Kostov
- Succeeded by: Vlado Bučkovski
- In office 12 May 2004 – 2 June 2004
- President: Branko Crvenkovski
- Preceded by: Branko Crvenkovski
- Succeeded by: Hari Kostov

Deputy Prime Minister for European Integration
- In office 1 November 2002 – 27 August 2006
- Prime Minister: Branko Crvenkovski; Hari Kostov; Vlado Bučkovski
- Preceded by: Hari Kostov
- Succeeded by: Gabriela Konevska-Trajkovska

Member of the Assembly of North Macedonia
- In office 19 November 1998 – 18 November 2024

Personal details
- Born: 10 June 1972 (age 54) Skopje, SR Macedonia, Yugoslavia (now North Macedonia)
- Party: Social Democratic Union of Macedonia
- Education: University of Skopje; Tufts University

Radmila Šekerinska Jankovska (Note: Macedonian: Радмила Шекеринска Јанковска, pronounced [ˈradmila ʃɛˈkɛrinska]) (born 10 June 1972) is a Macedonian politician who has been serving as the Deputy Secretary General of NATO since December 2024. Previously she served as the defense minister of North Macedonia and a former leader of the Social Democratic Union of Macedonia (SDSM). Šekerinska was previously Deputy Prime Minister for European Integration and National Coordinator for Foreign Assistance of North Macedonia and also was the acting Prime Minister of North Macedonia from 12 May 2004 until 12 June 2004 and from 3 November 2004 until 15 December 2004. She was elected 5 November 2006 the SDUM leader. She is the first female (acting) prime minister of North Macedonia.

Šekerinska was elected President of the Social Democratic Union of Macedonia at the party Congress following a no-confidence motion against the former leader Vlado Bučkovski. She left the position after the September 2008 party congress. Zoran Zaev was appointed as her successor until May 2009, when president Branko Crvenkovski's term ended. During her term as a deputy Prime Minister responsible for European Affairs, the European Council, in December 2005, granted North Macedonia a status of candidate country for accession to the European Union.

== Early life and education ==
Šekerinska holds a Master's Degree from The Fletcher School of Law and Diplomacy, Tufts University, which she obtained in 2007. She graduated in 1995 from Skopje's Faculty of Electrical Engineering with a degree in Power Engineering.

== Political career ==
Šekerinska became involved in the Open Society Institute of George Soros and in 1996 won a seat on Skopje City Council, which she held until she was elected to the Macedonian parliament in 1998. She subsequently became the deputy chairwoman of the Social Democratic Union of Macedonia (SDSM). She is a member of the presidency of the Party of European Socialists with which the SDSM is associated.

From 1997 to 2002, Šekerinska worked as an assistant at the Faculty of Electrical Engineering in Skopje, while in 1998 she was elected as a member of the Assembly of the Republic of Macedonia . She was elected for a deputy coordinator of the parliamentary group of the Social-Democratic Union of Macedonia (SDUM) and was a member of several parliamentary committees.

Šekerinska received a second mandate as an MP at the parliamentary elections in 2002, when she was immediately assigned Vice Premier of the Republic of Macedonia responsible for European integration.

Šekerinska served as spokeswoman in Crvenkovski's successful campaign for the Macedonian presidency during March–April 2004. She then served as acting prime minister for three weeks after Crvenkovski resigned to become president. Šekerinska was reappointed deputy prime minister in the government of Crvenkovski's successor as prime minister, Hari Kostov, on 3 June 2004.

Šekerinska is an author of a number of scientific and expert works.

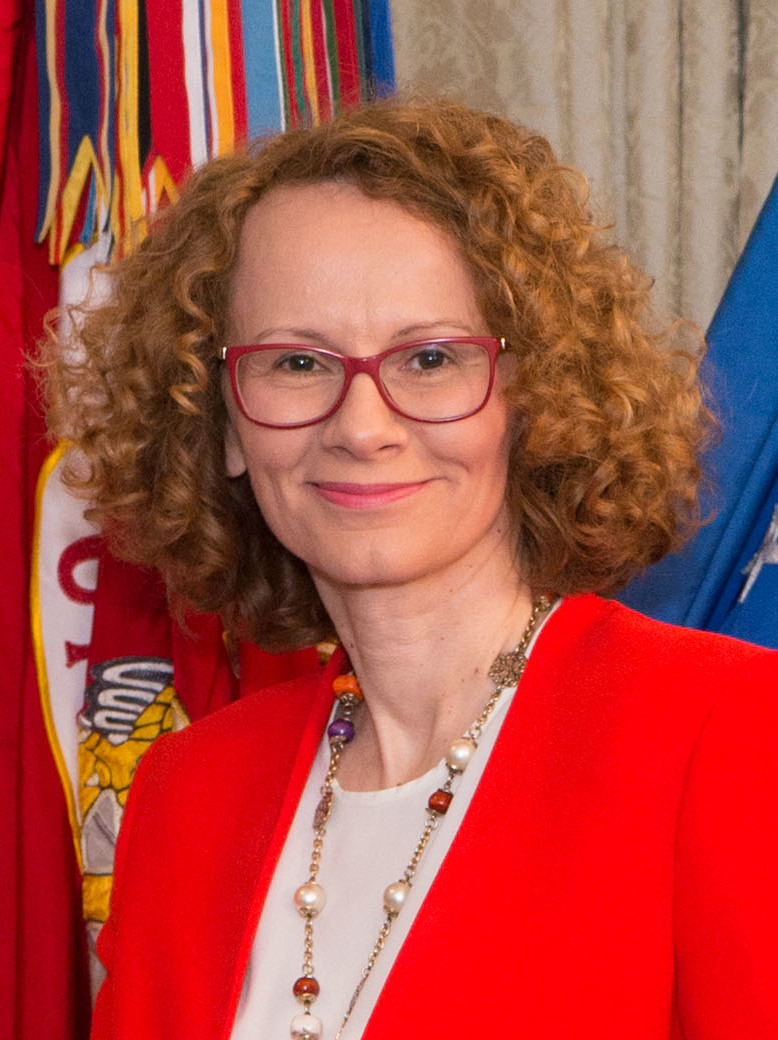
Šekerinska during her visit to the Pentagon in 2018

On 1 May 2018, Šekerinska and U.S. Defence Secretary James Mattis met at the Pentagon in Virginia to discuss the defense relationship between Macedonia and the United States. Additionally, the two discussed the naming dispute between Macedonia and Greece preventing the former's accession into the EU and NATO, as well as Macedonia's commitment to achieving 2% spending of GDP on defense.

On October 15, 2022, she was elected as one of the vice-presidents of the Party of European Socialists. On 19 November 2024, Secretary General of NATO Mark Rutte appointed Šekerinska as Deputy Secretary General of NATO. Šekerinska assumed office as Deputy Secretary General of NATO on 2 December 2024.

== Other activities ==
- European Council on Foreign Relations (ECFR), Member

== Recognition ==
Šekerinska is a winner of "Global Leaders of Tomorrow" Prize, awarded under auspices of the World Economic Forum.

== Notes ==
Political offices
Preceded by Branko Crvenkovski	Prime Minister of Macedonia; Acting; 2004	Succeeded by Hari Kostov
Preceded by Hari Kostov	Prime Minister of Macedonia; Acting; 2004	Succeeded by Vlado Bučkovski
