= Siljan Avramovski =

Macedonian politician

Ministry of Internal Affairs (Macedonia)
- In office 2 June 2004 – 17 December 2004
- Preceded by: Hari Kostov
- Succeeded by: Ljubomir Mihajlovski

Director of the Administration for Security and Counterintelligence
- In office 1 November 2002 – 2 June 2004
- Succeeded by: Mile Zechevikj

Personal details
- Born: Siljan Avramovski Skopje, Macedonia

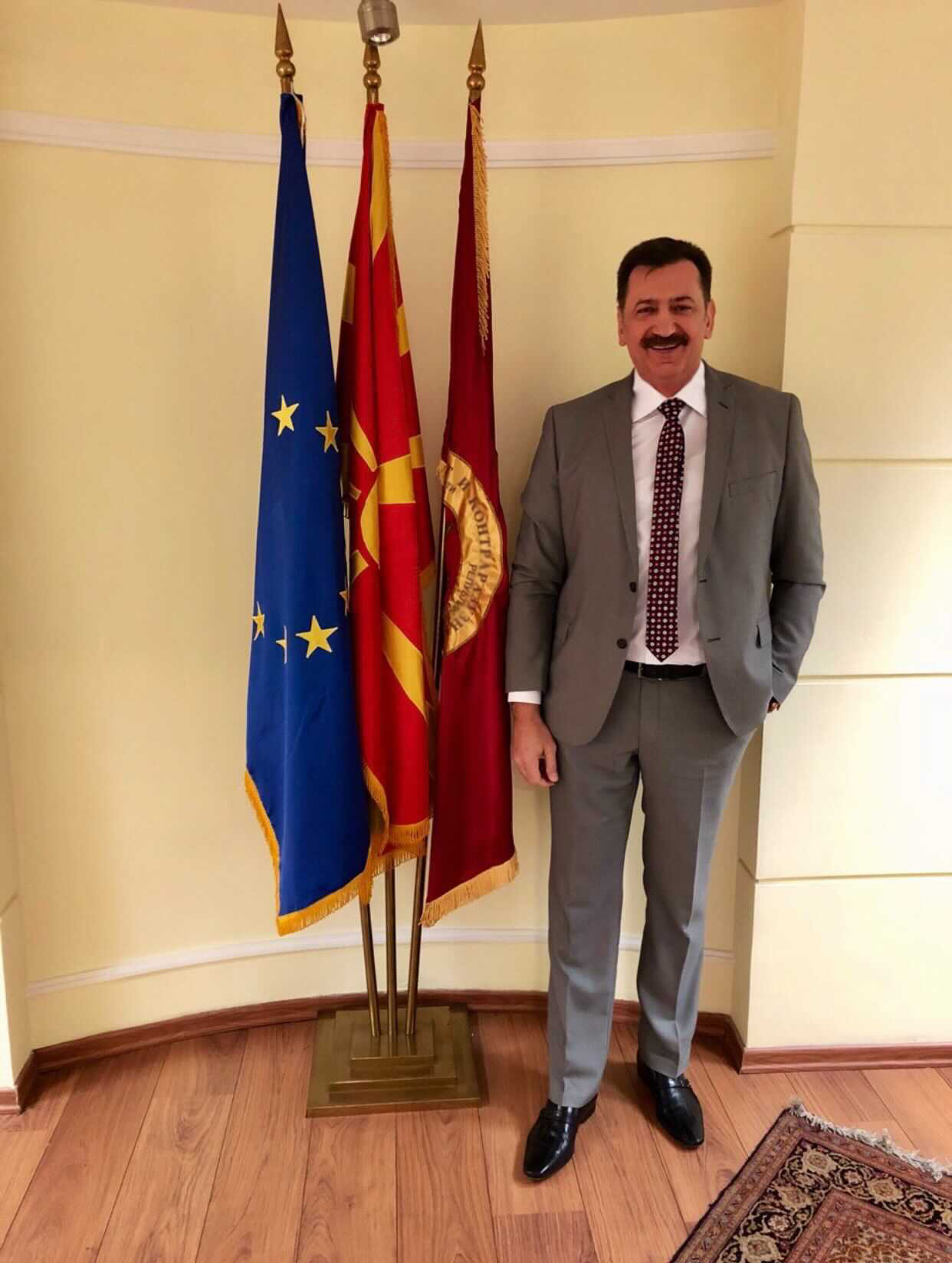

Siljan Avramovski (born 10 April 1960, in Skopje) is a Macedonian police official and former Minister of Internal Affairs in Macedonian Government that was in power since 2002.

== Biography ==
Siljan Avramovski was born in Skopje on 10 April 1960. He graduated at Security Faculty in 1983. After graduation, he was employed in the Ministry of Internal Affairs where he was gradually promoted working on several positions. At the beginning he worked as Inspector in Karposh. Later he became Chief inspector in the Department for Countering International and Domestic terrorism in State Security Service.

Avramovski was Assistant Head in the Department for Countering International and Domestic Terrorism in State Security Service, after this he became Head of Counterintelligence Department in Directorate for Security and Counterintelligence and then Assistant Director for Operations in the Directorate for Security and Counterintelligence.

After several years of work and promotions in State Security Service and in Directorate for Security and Counterintelligence, since 3 February 2003 Avramovski become the Director of the Directorate for security and Counterintelligence. From 2 June 2004 till 17 December 2004 he was appointed as Minister of Internal Affairs of Macedonia.

He speaks French and English.

== See also ==
On 03 October 2013, the Commission for facts verification, ungrounded and without any evidence, issued decision no. 07-1317/1 according to which Siljan Avramovski as Chief of DBK’s 1st Department was command/giving the orders and information user in terms of articles of the Law for determination of the condition for limitation and carrying out public functions; access to files/documents and performance of the cooperation with the state security bodies/institutions.

Based on lawsuit filed by Siljan Avramovski, on 21 April 2016, the Administrative Court reached a verdict U-5 no. 819/2015, accepting the plaintiff’s lawsuit and annulling the decision made by Commission for facts verification no. 07-1317/1 from 03 October 2013.

By issuing decision UZH – 3 no.667/2016 from 12 December 2016, Senior Administrative Court rejected the appeal of the Commission for facts verification, filed against the Administrative Court Verdict U-5 no819/2015 from 21 April 2016, as not permitted.

Political offices
Preceded by Hari Kostov	Minister of Internal Affairs; 2004	Succeeded by Ljubomir Mihajlovski
Preceded by Nikola Spasovski	Director of Administration for Security and Counterintelligence (2003-2004)	Succeeded by Mile Zechevikj
