= Ljubomir Mihajlovski =

Macedonian politician

Ljubomir Mihajlovski (Macedonian: Љубомир Михајловски; born 1954 in Skopje), is a Macedonian politician. He served as the minister of internal affairs of the Republic of Macedonia from December 2004 until August 2006. He graduated in law in 1980. He has had several posts in the ministry, including Deputy Assistant Minister of Criminal Police. He was Director general of the customs.

Political Office
Preceded by Siljan Avramovski	Minister of Internal Affairs; 2004–2006	Succeeded by Gordana Jankuloska
