= Lazar Elenovski =

Macedonian politician (born 1971)

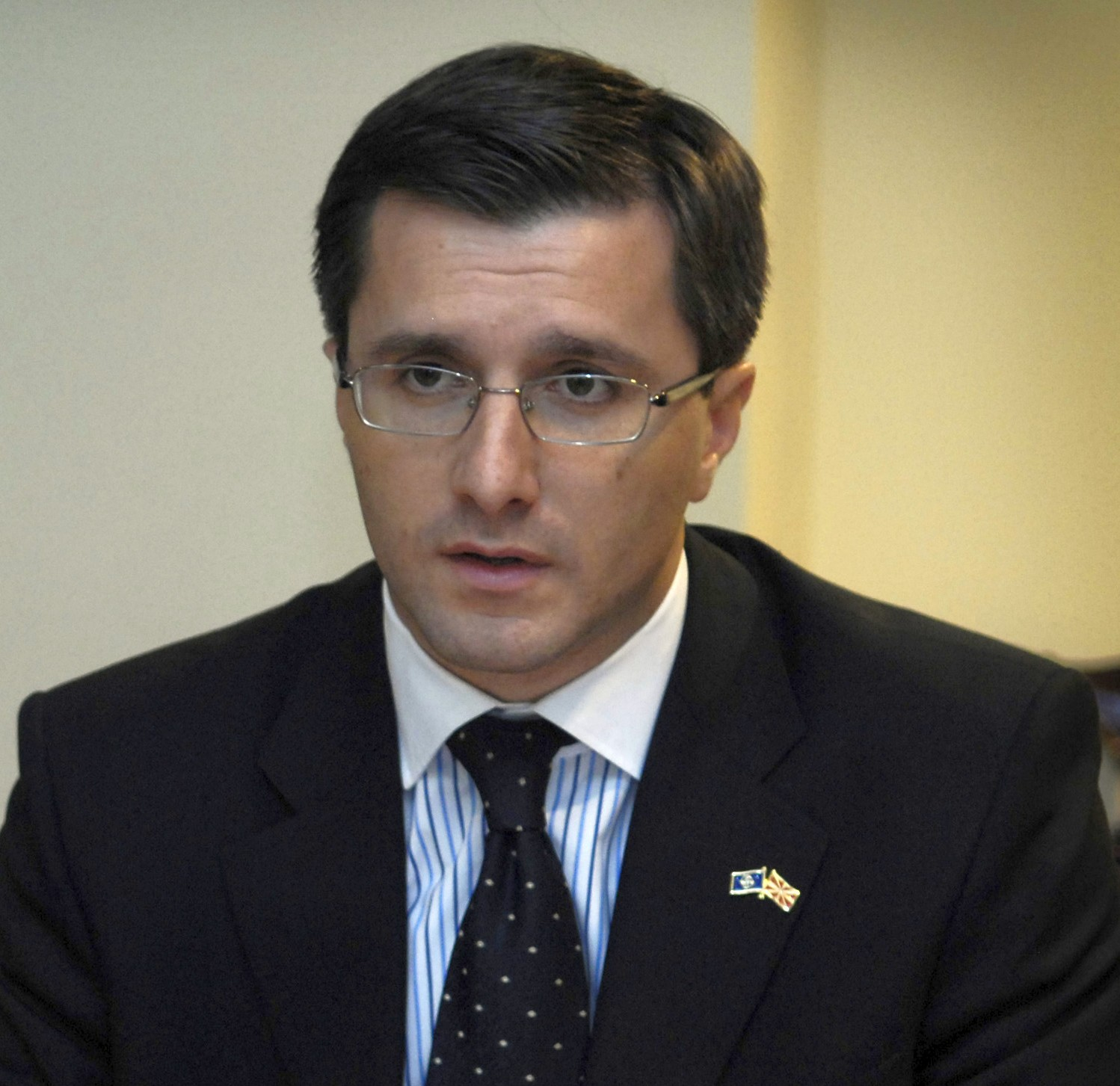
Lazar Elenovski at the Pentagon in 2007

Lazar Elenovski (born 19 March 1971 Macedonian : Лазар Еленовски) is a Macedonian politician, former Minister of Defence, elected on 26 August 2006 until 26 July 2008. He was Ambassador of Macedonia to Belgium and Luxembourg from September 2012 till December 2016 and Special Representative of the Macedonian Government to NATO from March 2018 until May 2020.

Politically active since Macedonia's independence he joined social-democratic political option. In 1995 he formed the first euro-atlantic youth organization in the country Young Europeans for Security-YES. He was President of the Euro-Atlantic Council of Macedonia (2005-2006, 2008- 2012), its Secretary General (2001-2005) and Vice-President of the international Atlantic Treaty Association (ATA) 2011-2014.

Born in Skopje, he is a graduate of the Faculty of Economy at the Ss. Cyril and MethodiusUniversity in Skopje where he also took a Master on Economic Development and International Finances. He is married with two children. His daughter Sara Elenovska and his son Alex Elenovski. His father is of Macedonian descent and his mother is of Albanian origin. He speaks Macedonian, Albanian, English, French, Serbian and Croatian.

Political offices
Preceded by Jovan Manasievski	Minister of Defense; 2006-2008	Succeeded by Zoran Konjanovski
