= Vlado Bučkovski =

Prime Minister of Macedonia from 2004 to 2006

- Владо Бучковски
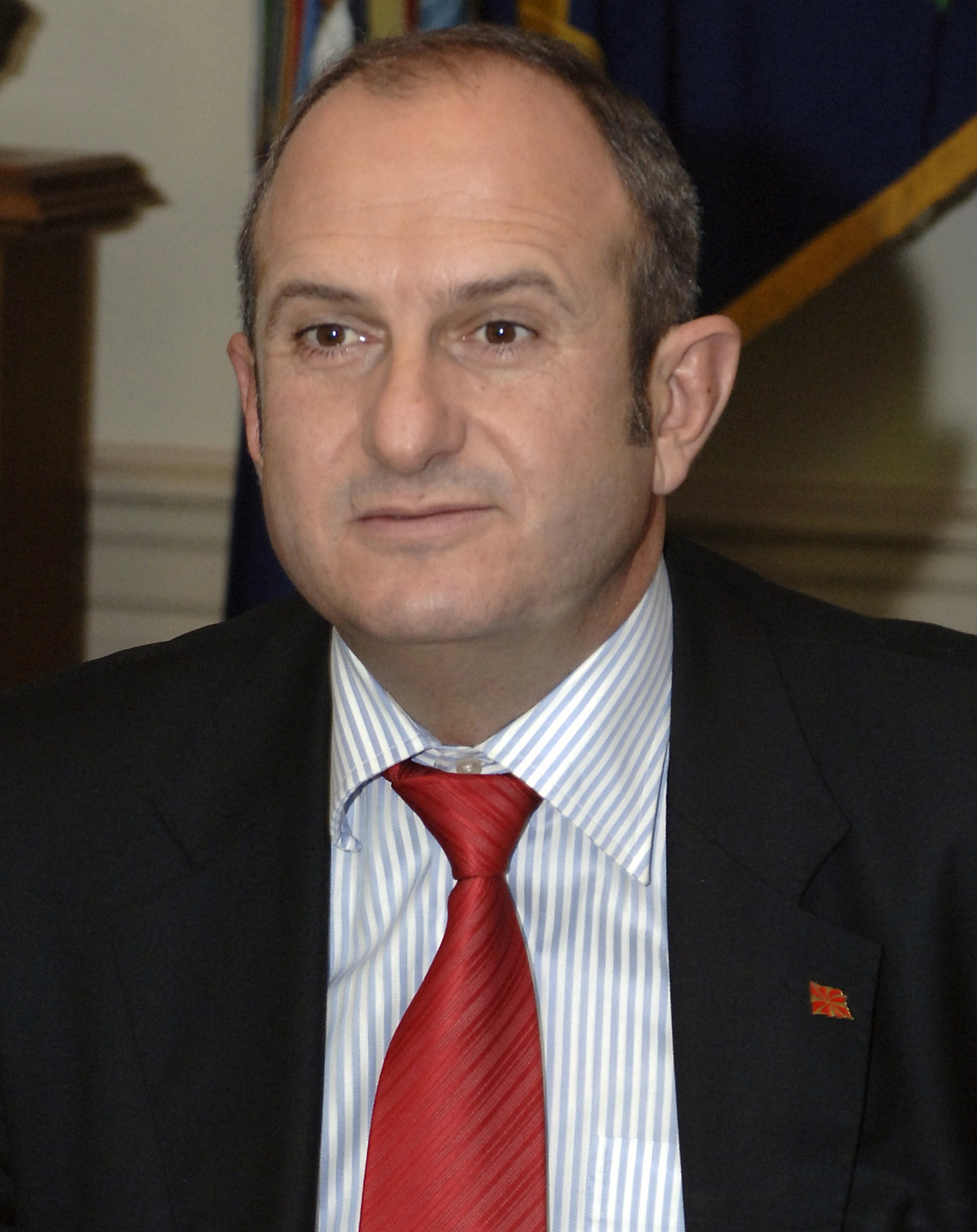
- Bučkovski in 2005

Prime Minister of Macedonia
- In office 17 December 2004 – 27 August 2006
- President: Branko Crvenkovski
- Preceded by: Hari Kostov
- Succeeded by: Nikola Gruevski

Minister of Defence
- In office 1 November 2002 – 17 December 2004
- Prime Minister: Branko Crvenkovski; Radmila Šekerinska (acting)
- Preceded by: Vlado Popovski
- Succeeded by: Jovan Manasievski
- In office 13 May 2001 – 26 November 2001
- Prime Minister: Ljubčo Georgievski
- Preceded by: Ljuben Paunovski
- Succeeded by: Vlado Popovski

Personal details
- Born: 2 December 1962 (age 63) Skopje, PR Macedonia, FPR Yugoslavia
- Party: Social Democratic Union
- Education: Ss. Cyril and Methodius University in Skopje

Vlado Bučkovski (Macedonian: Владо Бучковски; born 2 December 1962) is a Macedonian politician who served as Prime Minister of Macedonia from 2004 to 2006. He previously served as Minister of Defence from May to November 2001 and from 2002 to 2004. He was president of the Social Democratic Union of Macedonia. After the 2006 election defeat by the centre-right VMRO-DPMNE, Radmila Šekerinska took over the party's leadership.

On 9 December 2008, Bučkovski was found guilty of abuse of power while serving as defence minister during an armed conflict in 2001 and sentenced to three and a half years in jail.

== Early life ==
Vlado Bučkovski was born on December 2, 1962, in Skopje, Yugoslavia (Macedonia)

Bučkovski graduated from the Faculty of Law in Skopje in 1986, while he took his M.A. degree in 1992 at the Faculty of Law in Skopje. He took his Ph.D. degree at the Faculty of Law in Skopje in 1998, on topic "Roman and Contemporary Law of Obligations".

== Working and political experience ==
From 1987 to 1988 Bučkovski worked as an expert collaborator in the Parliament of the Republic of Macedonia, then part of Yugoslavia. In the period from 1988 to 2002 he worked as a lecturer, collaborator, junior assistant and as an assistant at the Faculty of Law in Skopje, while in 2003 he worked as an associate professor at the same faculty.

In the period from 1998 to 2000 Bučkovski was a member of the State Election Commission; while in 2000-2001 he was a Chairman of Skopje City Council. In the period from May 13 until November 26, 2001, he performed the function of a Minister of Defense in the wide coalition Government. From November 1, 2002, until December 2004, Bučkovski again served as Minister of Defense.

Bučkovski became a Chairman of the Government's Legal Council on September 15, 2003. He was elected SDSM Leader on November 26, 2004. On the same day, he was assigned a mandate for a composition of a new Government, following the resignation of former Prime Minister Hari Kostov. He served as prime minister until after the 2006 parliamentary elections, in which his party had a disappointing performance and a new government took office.

== Scandal ==
Members of parliament belonging to parties in Macedonia's centre-right ruling coalition voted on August 20, 2007, to strip former premier Bučkovski of his immunity from prosecution. That left him liable to being arrested on charges of involvement in an arms procurement deal costing the country 2.5 million euros (3.18 million U.S. dollars).

Prosecution said he had allegedly benefited from conspiring in 2001 with former Macedonian army chief of staff, General Metodi Stamboliski in buying and selling off spare parts for the army's Russian-made T-55 tanks. Stamboliski was arrested in late July 2007, charged with embezzling 1.8 million Euros (about US$2.5 million) and released on bail.

=== Conviction ===
On December 9, 2008, Bučkovski was found guilty of illegally purchasing excessive quantities of tank parts during the armed conflict in 2001 by Judge Vangelica and sentenced to three and a half years in jail. Former army chief of staff Metodi Stamboliski was jailed for three and a half years, and two defense ministry officials and the manager of a state-owned metal company Aco Gjurcevski, Nelko Menkinovski and Mitre Petkovski were sentenced to 3 years. Bučkovski called the verdict "scandalous" and said that he would appeal. He also said "We have proved that we are innocent and sorry that Macedonia and the court didn't use this opportunity to show its independence".

Political offices
Preceded by Hari Kostov	Prime Minister of the Republic of Macedonia; 2004-2006	Succeeded by Nikola Gruevski
Preceded by Vlado Popovski	Minister of Defense; 2002-2004	Succeeded by Jovan Manasievski
Preceded by Ljuben Paunovski	Minister of Defense; 2001-2001	Succeeded by Vlado Popovski
