= Luka Nakov =

Association football player

Personal information
- Full name: Luka Nakov
- Date of birth: 14 January 2000 (age 26)
- Place of birth: Skopje, Macedonia
- Height: 1.93 m (6 ft 4 in)
- Position: Goalkeeper

Youth career
- Slavia Sofia

Senior career*
Years	Team	Apps	(Gls)
2018	Slavia Sofia	1	(0)
2019	Bromley	0	(0)
- * Club domestic league appearances and goals as of 21:42, 13 April 2019 (UTC)

Luka Nakov (Bulgarian and Macedonian: Лука Наков; born 14 January 2000) is a Bulgarian-Macedonian footballer who last played as a goalkeeper for Bromley.

== Career ==
=== Slavia ===
On 19 April 2018 Nakov was included in the group for the league match against Cherno More on 20 April 2018. He made his professional debut for the team in that match coming as a substitute in the 60th minute after Emanuele Geria got injured. In February 2019, Nakov was an unused substitute for Bromley against Maidstone United.

== Career statistics ==
=== Club ===
As of 16 February 2019

Club performance			League		Cup		Continental		Other		Total	
Club	League	Season	Apps	Goals	Apps	Goals	Apps	Goals	Apps	Goals	Apps	Goals
Slavia Sofia	First League	2017–18	1	0	0	0	0	0	–		1	0
Bromley	National League	2018–19	0	0	0	0	0	0	–		0	0
Career statistics			1	0	0	0	0	0	0	0	1	0
