= Ivo Jankoski =

- Born: June 14, 1955; Skopje, today Macedonia
- Occupations: Producer, Manager, Publisher, Promoter
- Labels: Treto Uvo, M2 Produkcija

Ivo Jankoski (born June 14, 1955) is a producer, fine arts manager, publisher and promoter who established the first Macedonian independent record label, Treto Uvo ("Third Ear Music"). Jankoski's career has spanned 20 years.

== Early years ==
Jankoski graduated from Ss. Cyril and Methodius University of Skopje in 1980, receiving a degree in economics. He subsequently established the first Macedonian independent record label, Treto Uvo ("Third Ear Music"). Following a series of positions in different commercial companies, Jankoski began management of major Macedonian artists in 1990. Bands and artists that were members of Jankovski's management roster included Leb i Sol, Vlatko Stefanovski, Anastasia, Kiril Dzajkovski and Vanja Lazarova. The artists that Jankoski managed were from a range of genres, including rock, pop and world music. Jankoski also published their records and organized worldwide tours. Treto Uvo released the first Macedonian CD for the domestic music market.

== Career ==
In February 2012, Jankoski received an award for his publishing enterprise at the world's largest music trade fair, MIDEM, held in Cannes, France. As of February 2012, Jankoski is an active member of the Macedonian Ministry of Culture's committee on music piracy Jankoski is also a tour promoter of Macedonian Opera and Ballet, for both domestic and international performances. Together with UNICEF, Jankoski has launched several humanitarian projects for children in need, including The Victims of Tsunami and Reconstruction of the burned Saint Jovan Bigorski Monastery.

== Balkan Music Square Festival ==
In 2001, Ivo Jankoski started Balkan Music Square Festival (Балкански Музички Плоштад) in Ohrid, Macedonia. The festival has run in August for over ten years. The Festival traditionally brings together a few thousand people.

=== Recent Participating Musicians ===
Bulgaria

- Group – Isihia (2000),
- Group Zona C (2002),
- Group – Lot Lorien (2003),
- Theodosius Spasov (2003),
- Group – Transfrormation (2004),
- Valeri Dimchev Quartet (2005),
- Group – Ikadem (2006)
- Trio – Mystique Voices of Bulgaria (2007),
- Group – Om (2009).

Macedonia

- Group – Anastasia (2000),
- Vlatko Stefanovski feat. Miroslav Tadic, (Serbia) (2002),
- Group – Foltin (2002),
- Orkestar Pece Atanaskovski (2003),
- Group – String Forces (2004),
- Group – Ljubojna (2006),
- Acoustic band Baklava (2007),
- Vanja Lazarova (2009),
- Lambe Alabakovski (2010),
- Ace Janushev and joyful troupe (2010),
- Group – Synthesis (2005),
- Elena Risteska (2009/'11).

Greece

- Group – Avaton (2000),
- Giorgos Kazandzis Bend (2002),
- Group – Makis Ablianitis (2002),
- Group – Kontrabando (2003),
- Haig Yazdjian (2004),
- Group – Namaste (2005),
- Lizeta Kalimeri & Marta Frinzila (2009),
- Group – Kabaret Balkan (2010),
- Group – Imam Baildi (2011).

Serbia

- Miroslav Tadic feat. Vlatko Stefanovski (2002),
- Teofilovic Brothers (2002),
- Ognjen & Friends (2003),
- Group – Teodulia (2004),
- Group – Hazari (2005),
- Earth Wheel Sky Band (2006),
- Group – Arhai (2007),
- Biljana Krstic and Bistrik Orchestra (2010).

Albania

- Ensamble "3 Folk" (2005)

Italy

- Maurio Pagani (2005)

Brazil

- Cacau Brasil (2007)

Switzerland

- Duo May – Jo (2006)

Turkey

- Dreamin 'Istanbul (2009)

Croatia

- Group – Poppy (2009)

Germany

- Group – Besidos (2011)

== Amazing Macedonia ==
In 2009, Ivo Jankoski published Amazing Macedonia about Macedonian cultural heritage and natural beauties. Amazing Macedonia is an audio visual project (book and 40 minute video in DVD format) it contains over 600 photographs and over 100 natural sounds from Macedonia. The content of this project presents the most important and most visited places in Macedonia combining historical artifacts, archaeological, touristic etc.

The film took part in the official competition of the 47th Festival of Touristic Films in Lecce, Italy. It won a special award for cultural, historical and ambient presentation of Macedonia.

In September 2011 the project won the Golden Interstas award from the European Federation of Touristic journalists based in Rome, Italy.

The film had a nomination for the Grand Prix award at the International TourFilm Festival in Split, Croatia, and was awarded with a special prize from the festival.

== M2 Projects ==
Ivo jankoski's experience in handling stars such as Leb i Sol, Vlatko Stefanovski, Anastasia, Kiril Dzajkovski etc. also provided him with an excellent grounding in managing the TV project “Play- search for the new Star together with the famous balkan composer and producer Darko Dimitrov. They together started M2 Produkcija (Professional Record Label) and within the next ten years they discovered many new talent. They both produced Elena Risteska, Tuna and Lambe Alabakovski, who are famous music stars in Macedonia.
