= Marko Čalasan =

Macedonian computer systems prodigy

Marko Čalasan (Macedonian: Марко Чаласан; Serbian: Марко Ћаласан, romanized: Marko Ćalasan; born 2000) is a Macedonian computer systems prodigy. He was the youngest Microsoft Certified Systems Administrator at the age of eight and the youngest certified computer systems engineer at the age of nine.

== Work and education ==
Marko Čalasan was born in 2000 and is from Skopje, North Macedonia. Čalasan displayed excellent cognitive abilities at a very early age and was able to read and write by the age of two. When he was aged seven, Professor Elena Achkovska-Leshkovska from the Institute of Psychology tested him. She found that his brain operated identically as a child over the age of twelve. High levels of emotional and social skills were also found. He first made headlines in the United States in May 2010 when CNN's i-List did a story on him. Čalasan earned twelve Microsoft certificates and one Cisco certificate. He received his first certificate at the age of six. He is the youngest person to ever receive the MCSA (Microsoft Certified Systems Administrator) certificate, which he received at the age of eight. Čalasan then went on to study for the MCSE exam and was also the youngest person to receive the Microsoft Certified Systems Engineer Certificate as well. He taught computer basics to children eight to eleven in his former elementary school. The Macedonian government gave him an IT lab to advance his learning. Nikola Gruevski, the former prime minister of Macedonia, personally provided him with fifteen computers. His first gig as a system administrator was to remotely manage a network of computers for a nonprofit that works with people with disabilities. The Macedonian government in 2010 published his first 312-page book regarding the pre-installation, installation and post-installation process of Windows 7. In 2013, he was included in the list World's 50 Smartest Teenagers.

== Personal life ==
In addition to being skilled with computers, Čalasan is fluent in three languages, including English. Čalasan and his parents, who were also system engineers, opened an IT school for children in Skopje. His parents later separated, and he went on to live with his mother Radica. His mother died from cancer in 2016. After her death, the Macedonian news media appealed for his financial support as he had no other support.
