= Naum Panovski =

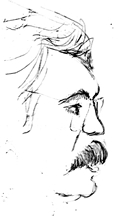

Naum Panovski (Macedonian: Наум Пановски) (born July 3, 1950 in Skopje, Republic of Macedonia) is a professional theatre director and writer. He graduated 1973 from the Academy for Theatre, Film, Radio, and Television in Belgrade and made his directorial debut that same year at the Dramski Teatar Dramatic Theatre in Skopje. He also holds a Master of Science Degree in Dramatic Arts from the University of Belgrade Faculty of Dramatic Arts, and a Ph.D. in the Humanities – Aesthetics of Theatre Directing, from the University of Texas in Dallas, United States.

During his professional career in theatre he has worked as a director or a dramaturge on more than seventy productions produced and performed in theatres in Bosnia, Croatia, Slovenia, Serbia, Macedonia, Italy, Russia, Bulgaria, Turkey, Poland, France, and the United States.

His books on theater include, Theatre as a Weapon, published in 1991 by Kultura Publishing from Skopje, Macedonia, and Directing Poiesis, published by Peter Lang Publishing from New York City 1993. Directing Poiesis addresses directly the art of theatre directing and explores its relevance from both theoretical, aesthetic, and practical perspective.

As a theatre critic and theorist he has contributed numerous articles to various publications, participated on panels and symposia, and served on boards and in other artistic leadership positions.

His work was inspired by the theories and practices of experimental theatre of Adolphe Appia, Vsevolod Meyerhold, Bertolt Brecht, Antonin Artaud, Peter Brook, Joseph Chaikin, Richard Scheckner, Tadeush Kantor, Carl Weber, Robert Corrigan, Mata Miloshevich, and Mira Miocinovic.

His recent production of Uncle Maroje by Marin Držić, was met with high acclaim and standing ovations at the internationally renowned Dubrovnik Summer Festival in Croatia.

He is currently Artistic Director of Poiesis Theatre Project.

== List of Theatre Productions (Chronological Partial List) ==
- Uncle Maroje by Marin Drzic, Dubrovnik Summer Festival, Dubrovnik, Croatia, July 2004
- Uncle Maroje by Marin Drzic, Hartke Theatre, Catholic University of America. Washington, D.C. April 2004
- Three Tall Women by Edward Albee, Catholic University of America. Washington, DC. 2001
- Mud by Maria Irene Fornes Dubrovnik 2001
- Trojan Women by Euripides. Washington. 2001
- Everyman by Anonymous. Washington. 2000
- Crucible by Arthur Miller. University of the Arts. Philadelphia. 1999
- Mud by Maria Irene Fornes. Skopje. 1988
- Glass Menagerie by Tennessee Williams. Christopher Newport University, Newport News. 1997
- Inspector General by Nikolai Gogol. Christopher Newport University, Newport News. 1997
- Phaedra by Robert Arthur. Christopher Newport University, Newport News. 1996
- Hamlet by William Shakespeare. Christopher Newport University, Newport News. 1995
- Sarajevo by Goran Stefanovski. Undermain Theatre, Dallas, TX. 1995
- Fable by Jean Claude van Itallie. Christopher Newport University, Newport News. 1994
- Eastern Diwan by Dzevad Karahasan. Bitola. 1990
- R by Jordan Plevnes. Banja Luka. 1990
- Metastabile Grail by Nenad Prokic. Banja Luka. 1986
- Hawthorn Tree by Bratislav Dimitrov. Skopje. 1985
- Anera by Ivo Bresan. Dubrovnik. 1983
- Crnila (Darkness) by Kole Casule. Stip. 1983
- Memet by Irfan Bellur. Skopje. 1981
- Hi-Fi by Goran Stefanovski. Kumanovo
- The Effect of Gamma Rays on Man-In-the-Moon Marigolds by Paul Zingel, Dramski Teatar Skopje, Skopje, Macedonia. May 1973
