= Bartrop =

Bartrop is an English surname. Notable people with the surname include:

- Paul R. Bartrop (born 1955), Australian historian
- Wilfred Bartrop (1887–1918), English footballer
