= Minister of Defence (North Macedonia) =

Government department in North Macedonia

Minister of Defence of the Republic of North Macedonia
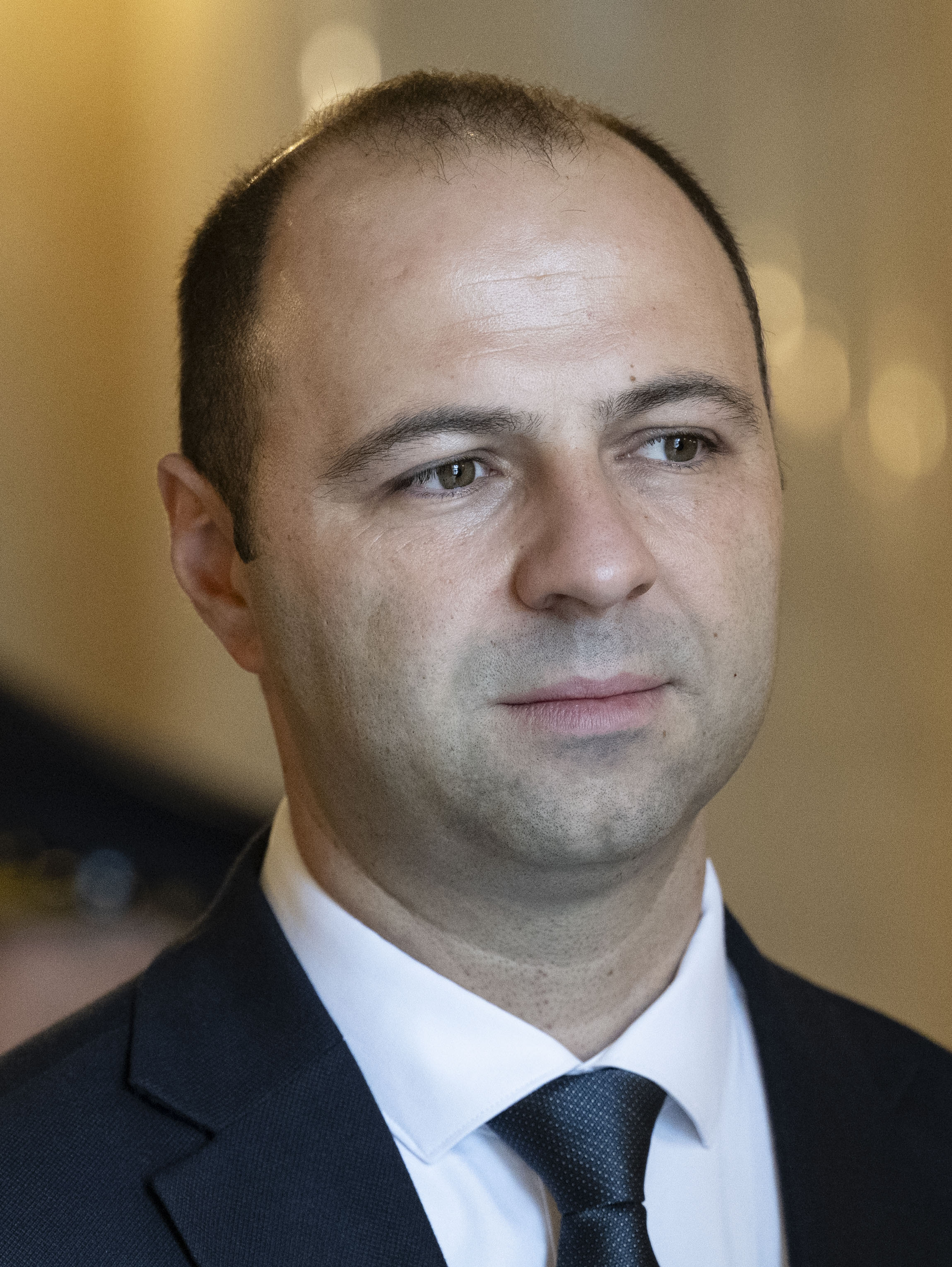
- Incumbent; Vlado Misajlovski since 24 June 2024
- Ministry of Defence of North Macedonia
- Member of: The Government
- Reports to: Prime Minister of North Macedonia
- Formation: 20 March 1991
- First holder: Risto Damjanovski

Minister of Defence of the Republic of North Macedonia is a post (minister) to lead the Ministry of Defence of North Macedonia. Currently, the post is held by Vlado Misajlovski, since 2024. He succeeded Slavjanka Petrovska who held the office from 2022 to 2024.

== History ==
The first Macedonian defence minister was Trajan Gocevski, who was in office in 1992. Vlado Popovski and Vlado Buchkovski were re-elected for the post that means they have served for two mandates each. The minister for the shortest amount of time was the first one, Trajan Gocevski, while for the longest period was Vlado Popovski.

A list of all Ministers of Defense of North Macedonia follows:

No.	Portrait	Minister (Birth–Death)	Term of office			Political Party
No.	Portrait	Minister (Birth–Death)	Took office	Left office	Time in office	Political Party
1	Risto Damjanovski [mk]	Risto Damjanovski (born 1937)	20 March 1991	10 January 1992	296 days	Independent
2	Trajan Gocevski [mk]	Trajan Gocevski (born 1950)	10 January 1992	4 September 1992	238 days	SDSM
3	Vlado Popovski [mk]	Vlado Popovski (born 1941)	4 September 1992	21 December 1994	2 years, 108 days	SDSM
4	Blagoja Handzhiski [mk]	Blagoja Handzhiski (born 1948)	21 December 1994	29 May 1997	2 years, 159 days	SDSM
5	Lazar Kitanovski [mk]	Lazar Kitanovski (1948–2011)	29 May 1997	1 December 1998	1 year, 186 days	SDSM
6	Nikola Kljusev	Nikola Kljusev (1927–2008)	1 December 1998	28 July 2000	1 year, 240 days	VMRO-DPMNE
7	Ljuben Paunovski [mk]	Ljuben Paunovski (born 1958)	28 July 2000	13 May 2001	289 days	VMRO-DPMNE
8	Vlado Bučkovski	Vlado Bučkovski (born 1962)	13 May 2001	26 November 2001	197 days	SDSM
(3)	Vlado Popovski [mk]	Vlado Popovski (born 1941)	26 November 2001	1 November 2002	340 days	Independent
(8)	Vlado Bučkovski	Vlado Bučkovski (born 1962)	1 November 2002	17 December 2004	2 years, 46 days	SDSM
9	Jovan Manasievski [mk]	Jovan Manasievski (born 1968)	17 December 2004	26 August 2006	1 year, 252 days	LDP
10	Lazar Elenovski	Lazar Elenovski (born 1971)	26 August 2006	27 July 2008	1 year, 336 days	New Social Democratic
11	Zoran Konjanovski [mk]	Zoran Konjanovski (born 1967)	27 July 2008	28 July 2011	3 years, 1 day	VMRO-DPMNE
12	Fatmir Besimi	Fatmir Besimi (born 1975)	28 July 2011	18 February 2013	1 year, 205 days	BDI
13	Talat Xhaferi	Talat Xhaferi (born 1961)	18 February 2013	19 June 2014	1 year, 121 days	BDI
14	Zoran Jolevski	Zoran Jolevski (born 1959)	19 June 2014	31 May 2017	2 years, 346 days	VMRO-DPMNE
15	Radmila Šekerinska	Radmila Šekerinska (born 1972)	31 May 2017	17 January 2022	4 years, 231 days	SDSM
16	Slavjanka Petrovska	Slavjanka Petrovska (born 1982)	17 January 2022	24 June 2024	2 years, 159 days	SDSM
17	Vlado Misajlovski	Vlado Misajlovski (born 1985)	24 June 2024	Incumbent	2 years, 76 days	VMRO-DPMNE
