= Vasko Gjurchinovski =

Chief of Defense (North Macedonia)

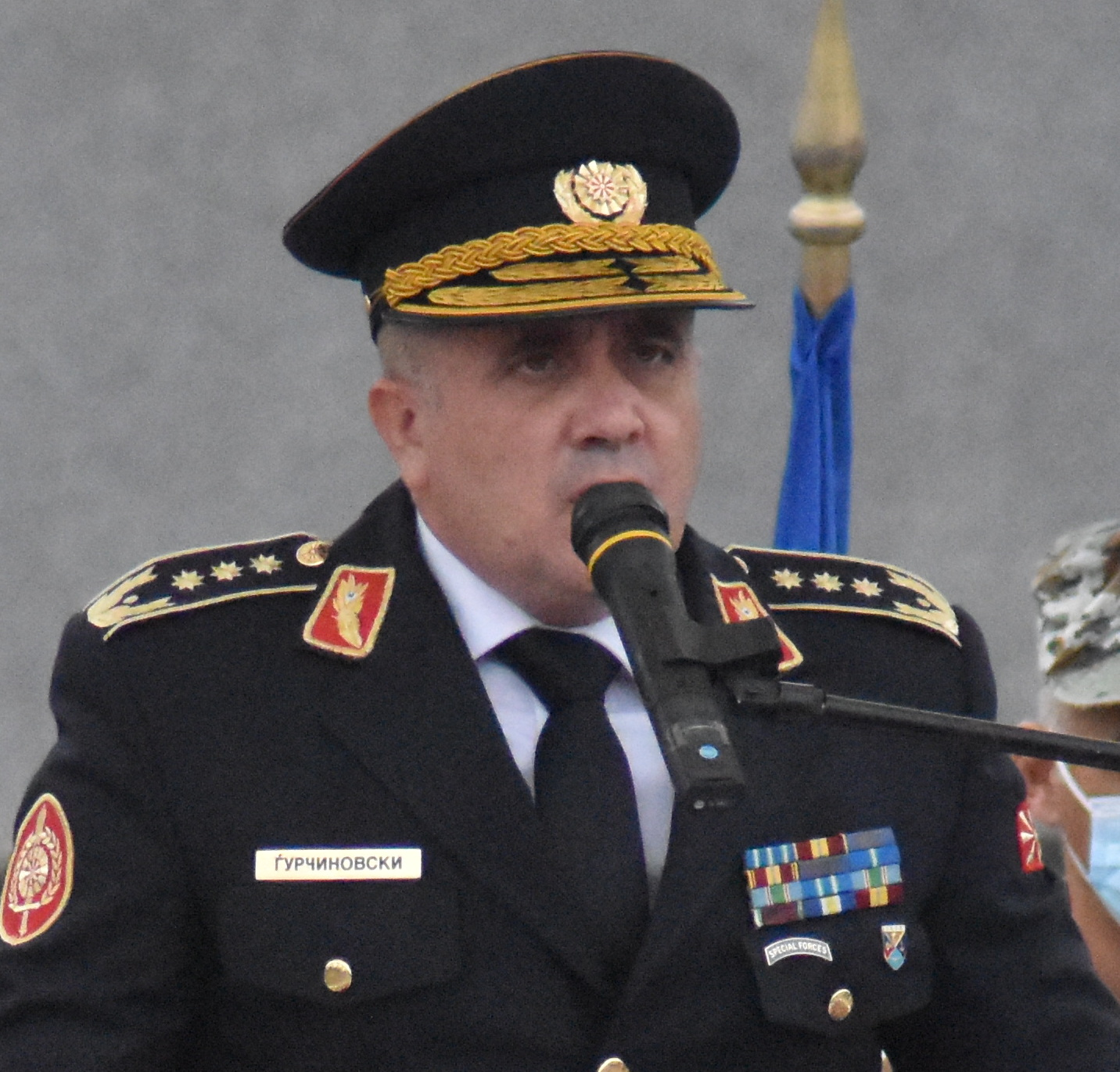
- Native name: Васко Ѓурчиновски
- Born: June 11, 1970 (age 55); Tetovo, SR Macedonia, SFR Yugoslavia
- Allegiance: Yugoslavia; North Macedonia
- Service years: 1991–
- Rank: general potpolkovnik

Vasko Gjurčinovski (Macedonian: Васко Ѓурчиновски; born June 11, 1970) is a general officer of the Army of North Macedonia and the 11th and current chief of defence.

Born in Tetovo, he obtained secondary and higher education in the Yugoslav military schools and academies in Sarajevo and Belgrade. He graduated in 1991, during the breakup of Yugoslavia. After serving briefly in the JNA in Zagreb, in 1992 he continued his service in the newly formed Army of the Republic of Macedonia. He was part of the first special operations unit of the Army. From 2008 to 2009 he participated in UNIFIL as a staff officer at the Joint Operations Center in Naqoura. From 2011 to 2013, he was the adjutant of the Supreme Commander of the Armed Forces, the President of the Republic, Gjorge Ivanov. From 2013 to 2015, he was the commander of the Special Operations Regiment, which included the then two army special operations units, the Special Purposes Battalion, nicknamed Wolves, and the Ranger Battalion. From 2015 to 2016, he headed the Army's Joint Operations Command. From 2016 to 2018, he was the military representative of Macedonia to NATO in Brussels. In 2018, he was appointed Chief of the General Staff of the Army.
