= Bojana Barltrop =

Yugoslav artist

Bojana Barltrop (born Bojana Jovanovic, in 1949 in Skopje, Yugoslavia. Also known as Bojana Komadina) is an artist and photographer. Barltrop's process-based body of work and research investigate the relationship between desire and politics through the lenses of the performative body and the architectural space.

== Education ==
Bojana Barltrop graduated from the Academy of Applied Arts in Belgrade, Yugoslavia, in 1973. She undertook additional studies at the Royal College of Graphics and the Schools of Arts and Crafts in Copenhagen, Denmark, from 1975 to 1976.

In 1977 Barltrop obtained an MPhil at the Faculty of Applied Arts in Belgrade, Yugoslavia, and in 2003 she earned a PhD at the Architectural Association School of Architecture in London, UK.

== Career ==
From the late 1970s to the early 1990s Barltrop was an active member of the experimental Belgrade and Yugoslavian art scene working mainly with media including photography (with a focus on the use of Polaroid cameras) and video.

Along with her artistic practice Barltrop was editor of the Design Programme for the Gallery Sebastian in Dubrovnik (1981–1986) and Member of the Managing Board and Chief Executive of Studio 019 Sintum in Belgrade (1984–1992).

Barltrop has lived in the UK since 1993.

Her work Suicide (1981) was acquired by the Museum of Contemporary Art in Belgrade (MSUB) as part of the permanent collection of its newly opened building (2017) and shown at the exhibition Sequences. Art of Yugoslavia and Serbia from the collection of the Museum of Contemporary Art.

== Solo exhibitions ==
=== 1979 ===
The Woman Capable Everything, Happy Gallery, Student Cultural Centre, Belgrade, Yugoslavia.

=== 1981 ===
The Book/ Nineteen stories, Happy Gallery, Student Cultural Centre, Belgrade, Yugoslavia

Imagined Condition/ Transformans, Happy Gallery, Student Cultural Center, Belgrade, Yugoslavia

=== 1992 ===
Bojana Komadina, Museum of Applied Art, Belgrade, Yugoslavia.

=== 2017 ===
The Great Chain of Being, Museum of Contemporary Arts, Legat Rodoljuba Čolakovića I Milice Zorić, Belgrade, Serbia.

== Other exhibitions ==
=== 1982 ===
Arteder ’82 Muestra Internacional de Obra Gráfica/ International Graphic Arts Exhibition, Bilbao, Spain.

Some aspects of Yugoslav Contemporary Photography, Open Eye Gallery, Liverpool, UK and The Showroom of the Museum of the Contemporary Art, Belgrade, Yugoslavia.

=== 1983 ===
Einige Aspekte der zeitgenössischen jugoslawischen Fotografie (Some aspects of Yugoslav Contemporary Photography) published by Fotogalerie Forum Stadtpark, Graz, Austria.

Examples of Instant Art Polaroid-Video-Xerox, Art Gallery, Cultural Center Belgrade, Yugoslavia.

=== 1991 ===
150 years of Serbian photography, Gallery of Serbian Academy of Art and Sciences, Belgrade, Yugoslavia.

=== 1993 ===
Critic's Choice: Bojana Komadina, Dusan Otasevic and Pedja Neskovic, Art Gallery, Cultural Center Belgrade, FR Yugoslavia

=== 2017 ===
Sequences. Art of Yugoslavia and Serbia from the collection of the Museum of Contemporary Art, Museum of Contemporary Art Belgrade, Serbia.
