= Slavjanka Petrovska =

Macedonian Minister of Defense and politician

- Славјанка Петровска
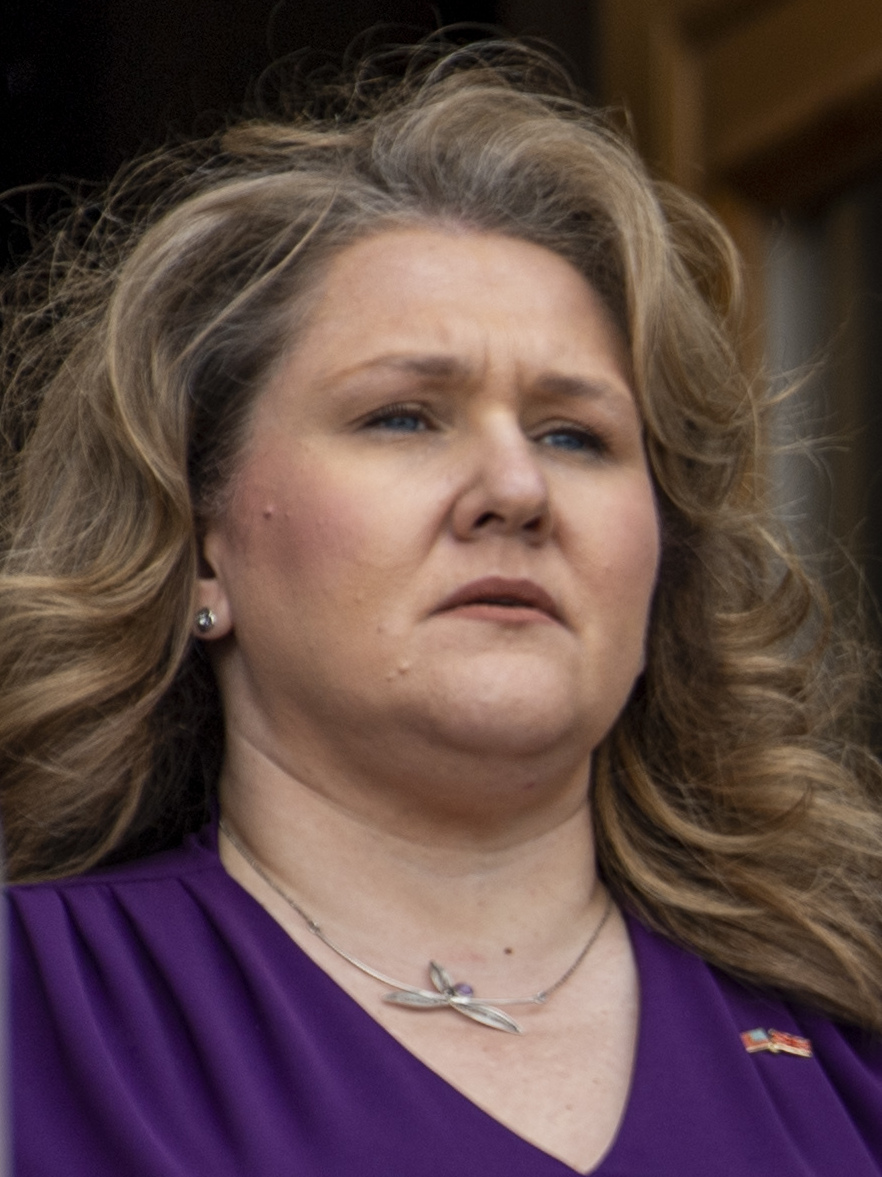
- Petrovska in 2023

Minister of Defense
- In office January 17, 2022 – June 23, 2024
- Prime Minister: Dimitar Kovačevski
- Preceded by: Radmila Šekerinska
- Succeeded by: Vlado Misajlovski

Member of the Macedonian Assembly
- In office 2020–2022
- Incumbent
- Assumed office 2024

Personal details
- Born: January 11, 1982 (age 44) Skopje, SR Macedonia, Yugoslavia (now North Macedonia)
- Party: SDSM
- Education: Ss. Cyril and Methodius University in Skopje

Slavjanka Petrovska (Macedonian: Славјанка Петровска Стани-Цаци), (born January 11, 1982) is a Мacedonian politician who has been the Minister of Defense of North Macedonia from January 2022 – June 2024.

== Early life and education ==
Slavjanka Petrovska was born on January 11, 1982, in Skopje. She completed her schooling there before graduating in law from the Ss. Cyril and Methodius University of Skopje in Skopje. She is a candidate for a master's in administrative law at the same institution.

== Career ==
Petrovska worked in the Secretariat on European Affairs from 2003 until 2006, then spent two years working at the Assembly on International Cooperation. From 2008 until 2015, she worked for the National Council on Euro-Integration.

Petrovska was in the Cabinet of the Minister of the Interior for two short stints in 2015 and 2016 and then Chief of Staff to the Minister from June 2017. From January 2020 til July 2020 she was a Deputy Minister of Interior for the caretaker government before the July 2020 parliamentary elections. She was then elected as a Member of the Assembly of the Republic of North Macedonia for the ruling SDSM party, serving on the legislative, oversight, and national security committees.

Petrovska was appointed Minister of Defense by Prime Minister Dimitar Kovačevski on 17 January 2022. She said later that month that North Macedonia favoured a diplomatic solution to the Russia-Ukraine dispute. On 1 March, she announced that North Macedonia would donate military material and equipment to Ukraine.

In June 2022, Petrovska attended the inaugural US-North Macedonia Strategic Dialogue in Washington DC and in October 2022 she made a two-day official visit to Slovenia for bilateral talks.
