= Military Academy of North Macedonia =

General Mihailo Apostolski Military Academy
- Воена академија „Генерал Михаило Апостолски“
- Emblem
- Type: Public
- Established: 1995; 31 years ago
- Affiliations: Army of Macedonia
- Officer in charge: Prof. Dr. Colonel Orce Popovski
- Location: Skopje, Macedonia
- Colors: Red and Yellow
- Website: Military Academy

The General Mihailo Apostolski Military Academy (Macedonian: Воена академија „Генерал Михаило Апостолски“) is the main educational institution for officers of the Army of Macedonia, located in Skopje.

== History ==
Three years of preparation preceded the Academy's founding. It was established on 7 June 1995 with the ratification of the Law on the Military Academy by the Assembly of Macedonia, with the first class of cadets entering the academy on 25 September 1995. In 1996 the Academy received the name "General Mihailo Apostolski" Military Academy (after Colonel general Mihailo Apostolski, leader of the Macedonian partisans, which fought against Axis powers during the National Liberation War of Macedonia, 1941-45). The Military Academy is defined as a military higher education and research institution, according to the law, and its activities are in accordance with the Law on Higher Education and Law on scientific research in the country.

In the academic year 2003-04 not accept cadets for undergraduate studies. In December 2008, the government decided to restart the work of the Military Academy as a part of the Goce Delčev University (Štip), and in September 2009, after restarting its function, the Military Academy has been received and a new class of cadets.
