= Ferdinand Odžakov =

Macedonian politician

- Фердинанд Оџаков

Director of Military Service for Security and Intelligence
- In office 2007–2015
- President: Gjorgje Ivanov
- Preceded by: Risto Gjorgjiev
- Succeeded by: Dragan Kovacki

Personal details
- Born: Ferdinand Odzakov; 31 May 1969 (age 57) Gnjilane, Yugoslavia today Kosovo
- Education: Skopje University

Ferdinand Odzakov was a Director of Military Service for Security and Intelligence of Army of the Republic of Macedonia of Macedonia.

Military offices
| Preceded by Risto Gjorgjiev | Director of the Military Service for Security and Intelligence (2007–2012) | Succeeded by Dragan Kovacki |
