= Anita Angelovska-Bežoska =

Macedonian economist

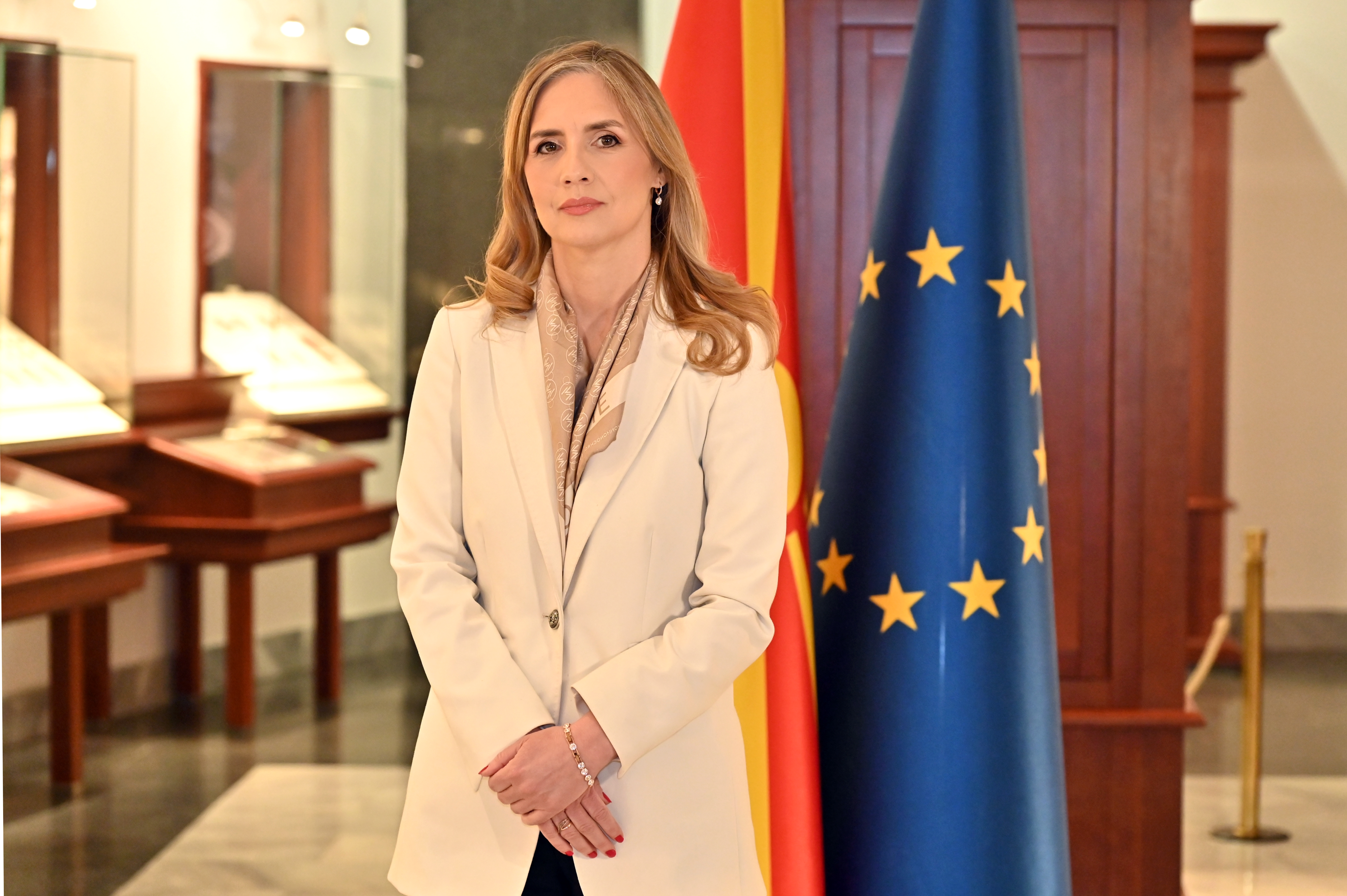

5th Governor of the National Bank of North Macedonia
- In office 21 May 2018 – 31 May 2025
- Preceded by: Dimitar Bogov
- Succeeded by: Trajko Slaveski

Personal details
- Born: 5 November 1971 (age 54) Gothenburg, Sweden
- Education: Ss. Cyril and Methodius University of Skopje (BS 1994 and MS 1997); University of Ljubljana (PhD 2015)
- Profession: economist

Anita Angelovska-Bežoska (born 5 November 1971) is a Macedonian economist who served as Governor of the National Bank of North Macedonia from 2018 to 2025. Previously, she served as Vice Governor of the National Bank from 2011 to 2018. She has also worked for the Ministry of Finance and had a two-year work arrangement at the International Monetary Fund.

== Early life and education ==
Anita Angelovska-Bežoska was born on 5 November 1971 in Gothenburg, Sweden. She graduated from the Faculty of Economics at the Ss. Cyril and Methodius University of Skopje in Skopje in 1994, after which she received her master's degree from the same faculty in 1997. She obtained her PhD in economic sciences at the School of Economics and Business, Ljubljana in 2015.

== Career ==
=== Ministry of Finance ===
Angelovska-Bežoska began her career in 1996 as a financial system expert at the Ministry of Finance where she worked for eight years, first as Head of the Project for Establishing a Treasury System in the Republic of Macedonia (1999–2000) and then as Head of the Treasury Sector (2000–2003). She worked on reforms in the country's public finance system, such as the establishment of a single treasury account as well as a system for regular budget liquidity and liquidity management forecasting, improvement of budget accounting, development of the government securities market and improvement of budget reporting under the international standards.

In the period 2003–2004, Angelovska-Bežoska was a State Secretary at the Ministry of Finance. In the same period, she was also a member of the Governing Board of the Health Insurance Fund of the Republic of Macedonia. In 2004, her contribution to the development of Macedonia's public finance was awarded by the US Embassy in Skopje.

=== National Bank ===
Angelovska-Bežoska joined the National Bank of the Republic of Macedonia as Chief Economist in 2004 and held this position until 2010, after which she served as Vice Governor of the National Bank. During this period, she had a two-year work arrangement as an Economist in the Department of Macroeconomic Policies in European countries and in the Fiscal Policies Department at the International Monetary Fund (IMF) in Washington, D.C.. She also participated in several IMF negotiating missions to conclude arrangements with member countries. As Vice Governor, she was also Alternate Governor of the Republic of Macedonia on the IMF Board of Directors.

In May 2018, Angelovska-Bežoska became the first female Governor of the National Bank of the Republic of Macedonia. In March 2019, she was also elected as a member of the The Vienna Initiative 2.0 Steering Committee, representing the six non-EU countries from Southeast Europe. As Governor, she was a country representative on the IMF Board, as well as a member of the Irving Fisher Committee on Central Bank Statistics at the Bank for International Settlements (BIS) in Basel, Switzerland.

== Academic career ==
Angelovska-Bežoska is author of research papers on topics in the areas of monetary policy, macroeconomic policy, fiscal policy and public finance management. She has also worked as a lecturer at domestic and international educational and research institutions.

== Personal life ==
Angelovska-Bežoska is married and has three children.
