= Zoran T. Popovski =

Macedonian molecular biologist

- Born: 8 September 1962
- Citizenship: Republic of Macedonia
- Known for: molecular biology in animal science, genetic engineering, GMO
- Scientific career
- Institutions: Ss. Cyril and Methodius University of Skopje
- Doctoral advisor: Academician Georgi Efremov PhD M.D. G. Eng.

Dr. Zoran T. Popovski is a Macedonian scientist and professor working at the Institute of Animal Biotechnology under the Faculty of Agricultural Sciences and Food in the Ss. Cyril and Methodius University, Skopje, Republic of Macedonia. He is a specialist in molecular biology in animal science, genetic engineering and GMO. He has been working for the faculty since 1992.

In the period 2002-2006 he worked as a State Secretary in the Ministry of Education and Science of the Republic of Macedonia. In this role he was a member of the National Expert Group and worked on Education Strategy. He also represented Macedonian Science and Technology within the western Balkans EU region.

Popovski's last publication discussed polymorphism in the genome of indigenous Macedonian and Slovenian sheep breeds.

== Selected publications ==
- Dimitrievska, Blagica R.; Popovski, Zoran T. (2010). "Merging procedures for detection of Soy DNA and presence of GM Soy in food samples" (PDF).
- Miskoska-Milevska, Elizabeta; Dimitrievska, Blagica; Poru, Koo; Popovski, Zoran T. (2008). "Differences in Tomato Seed Protein Profiles obtained by SDS-PAGE analysis" (PDF). Journal of Agricultural Sciences Vol. 53, No1.
