= Dimitrova =

Dimitrova may refer to:

== Places ==
- Dimitrova, Cîietu, Cantemir district, Moldova
- Dimitrova, Crasnencoe, Transnistria, Moldova
- Dimitrova Peak, Alexander Island, Antarctica

== People ==
- Aleksandra Dimitrova (born 2000), Russian chess master
- Alexenia Dimitrova (born 1963), Bulgarian journalist
- Anastasia Dimitrova (1815–1894), Bulgarian teacher
- Blaga Dimitrova (1922–2003), Bulgarian poet and vice president of Bulgaria
- Desislava Dimitrova (born 1972), Bulgarian sprinter
- Ekaterina Dimitrova (born 1987), Bulgarian basketball player
- Elizabeta Dimitrova (born 1962), Macedonian art historian, Byzantinist and professor
- Emilia Dimitrova (born 1970), Bulgarian badminton player
- Galina Dimitrova (born 1978), Bulgarian tennis player
- Gergana Dimitrova (born 1975), Bulgarian theatre director
- Gergana Dimitrova (volleyball) (born 1996), Bulgarian volleyball player
- Ghena Dimitrova (1941–2005), Bulgarian opera singer
- Iskra Dimitrova (born 1965), Macedonian artist
- Lora Dimitrova (born 1962), Bulgarian pianist
- Kristin Dimitrova (born 1963), Bulgarian writer and poet
- María Dimitrova (born 1985), Bulgarian–Dominican martial artist
- Mariana Dimitrova (1954–2005), Bulgarian actress
- Mariya Dimitrova (born 1976), Bulgarian triple jumper
- Mariyana Dimitrova (born 1982), Bulgarian athlete
- Nasya Dimitrova (born 1992), Bulgarian volleyball player
- Rositsa Dimitrova (born 1955), Bulgarian volleyball player
- Silvia Dimitrova (born 1970), Bulgarian icon painter
- Simona Dimitrova (born 1994), Bulgarian volleyball player
- Svetla Dimitrova (born 1970), Bulgarian athlete
- Tanya Dimitrova (born 1957), Bulgarian volleyball player
- Valentina Dimitrova (1956–2014), Bulgarian athlete
- Viktoria Dimitrova (1976–1994), Bulgarian figure skater
- Viktoriya Dimitrova (born 1979), Bulgarian rower
