= Starova =

Starova or Stárová is a surname. It is a feminine version of the masculine Slavic surname Starov, and is also an independent unisex Albanian surname. It may refer to the following notable people:

- Antonie Stárová (born 1998), Czech football midfielder
- Gëzime Starova, Albanian author, translator, lawyer and jurist
- Luan Starova (1941–2022), Albanian writer
- Sulejman Starova (disambiguation), multiple people
