= Freud's Sister =

2011 Macedonian novel

First edition (Macedonian) publ. Kultura

Freud's Sister is a Macedonian novel written about the life of Sigmund Freud’s sister, Adolfina. Written by Goce Smilevski, it was originally published in Macedonia in 2011 and won the EU Prize for Literature in 2010 before it was published. It was subsequently translated by Christiana Kramer into English and published in the United States of America in 2012. This novel follows the life story of Adolfina from childhood until her death in a concentration camp in 1938 at Terezin.

== Plot ==
This novel begins in 1938, Vienna, Austria, right after the Germans have invaded and taken over. Because Adolfina and her sisters are Jewish, they are afraid that they will share the fate of the Jews in Germany. Sigmund Freud, their brother, tells them not to worry, because everything will settle down. However, Sigmund packs up his household and leaves for Switzerland without them. Adolfina begs him to grant them exit visas as well, but he refuses. Adolfina and her sisters are taken to a concentration camp where they are put into a death chamber. She smells the gas and experiences a flashback to her childhood.

She was a sickly child and therefore spent a lot of time with her mother. Her mother sometimes acted like she loved her, but other times Adolfina would hear her mother saying, “It would have been better if I had not given birth to you.” She loved her brother Sigmund, and he would tell her stories in bed when they were alone. Her mother loved Sigmund more than all the other children because when she was pregnant with him an old woman told her that he would be a great man.

When they were alone, they would lie under the covers and Sigmund would tell her stories about the outside world because she was not strong enough to go outside often. One day after she had fallen asleep during story time she woke up with Sigmund gone. She went to find him in his room and discovered him masturbating. This scared her so that their relationship was never the same and they started to avoid each other. However, they maintained a relationship through the books he lent her.

Because Adolfina did not go to school Sigmund set up drawing lessons for her that were being offered by one of his professors. His professor's son, Rainer was always sad and his parents thought that him playing with other children would help. Adolfina and Rainer became very close friends, but eventually Rainer moved away and their friendship was broken off.

After Rainer moved away Adolfina started taking drawing classes with another friend, Sarah. Sarah was also weak like her, because she had anemia. They both applied to the School of Applied Arts, but they did not get it. After Adolfina's mother found out that she was rejected from art school, she pressured Adolfina stop painting because she did not believe that it was a useful skill.

Sarah and Adolfina would sometimes go to parties that Sarah's sister, Bertha, would host for other university students. At one of these parties they met Klara, the sister of Gustav Klimt; a woman who was very involved in women's rights movements. She was arrested and beaten multiple time until this became mentally too much and she was admitted to a mental hospital.

At one of these gatherings Sigmund met Sarah and they began seeing each other, but then Sigmund met a girl named Martha and married her instead. After Sigmund married he moved out of the house, but Adolfina would visit him at the hospital where he worked. During one of these visits she saw a man there who had the previous day tried to commit suicide by jumping into the Danube river. It was Rainer.

Rainer and Adolfina started to see each other, and she helped him find his birth mother. When they meet his mother, she is nothing like he expected. He is so shaken up by this visit that he leaves town and Adolfina. However, he returns and they start a relationship. But, Rainer gets tired of her and starts seeing someone else. Adolfina continues to go to his house until he kicks her out and moves away again.

He then returned after many years. He told Adolfina that he was afraid that she would abandon him as his mother abandoned him. Adolfina swore that she would never leave him. Rainer wanted to see his mother one last time. She took him to see his mother, but she had just recently died. He was so overcome with the meaningless of life that he jumps into the Danube and kills himself.

Adolfina discovered that she is pregnant. Her brother arranged an abortion in their house. After the abortion, she was so distraught at losing her one chance at motherhood and what she believes is her purpose in life that she moved into the mental hospital with Klara. She stayed with Klara in this hospital for a while until Klara leaves. She then moved back in with her mother until her mother became very sickly. Adolfina called Sigmund to ask him to return to Vienna to say goodbye to his mother. However, he refused to come back early because he would be there in a couple of months for his summer vacation. His mother died without him saying goodbye.

After Adolfina's mother died, she entered a period with no real guidance in her life. Two more of her family members died, her sister's daughter and Sigmund's grandson. She went on vacation with Sigmund and his daughter, Anna. However, it was not as she expected, and she and Sigmund get in an argument about what happens after death. She accused him of believing that he will be immortalized through his works.

This is the end of the flashback. The narrative goes back into the gas chamber with Adolfina at the end of her life. Adolfina is remembering her life and thinking about how she will forget everything, for “that will be my death – that forgetting – I will forget.”

== Characters ==
- Adolfina Freud: the main character, a sensitive woman
- Sigmund Freud: Adolfina's oldest brother, a famous psychoanalyst
- Paulina, Marie, and Rosa Freud: Adolfina's sisters
- Amelie Freud: Adolfina's mother
- Sarah Auerbach: Adolfina's friend that she took drawing lessons with, Sigmund's former girlfriend
- Bertha Auerbach: Sarah's sister
- Klara Klimt: a friend of Sarah and Adolfina, an ardent supporter of women's rights who becomes mentally ill and spends most of her life in a mental hospital
- Rainer Richter: Adolfina's boyfriend and the father of her aborted child; commits suicide
- Dr. Goethe (grandson of Johann Wolfgang von Goethe): the main physician at the mental hospital where Adolfina stays with Klara
- Gustav Klimt: Klara's brother and famous symbolist painter

== Author's Inspiration ==
Goce Smilevski writes in the Author's Note of Freud’s Sister that he was surprised by the lack of knowledge on the sisters that Freud left behind in Vienna, who later died in a concentration camp. All he could find out about her from letters was that she lived alone, her family felt pity for her, and while her mother treated her badly, she cared for her parents until they died. He chose Adolfina because “the silence around Adolfina is so loud that I could write this novel in no other way then in her voice.”

== Translation ==
This novel was translated by Christiana Kramer, a Slavic and Balkan language professor at the University of Toronto.

== Critical reception ==
Joyce Carol Oates in the New York Review of Books writes, "many readers may find [Freud's Sister] mesmerizing and some will find [it] highly controversial." The way Freud's character is portrayed in Freud's Sister has been seen by some as character assassination. Not only that, but Oates also has some harsh words for how Adolfina is portrayed, describing the character as "scarcely articulate, and exasperatingly passive, to a degree that suggests mental retardation." Smilevski responded to this criticism by arguing that people who display these characteristics do not have to be mentally challenged, and through Adolfina's depression she is more able to examine herself and "the meaning of existence."
