= Arsov =

Arsov (Macedonian and Bulgarian: Арсов) is a Bulgarian and Macedonian masculine surname, its feminine counterpart is Arsova. It may refer to:

- Džordže Arsov (born 1946), Mayor of Kisela Voda, Macedonia
- Elena Arsova (born 1975), Bulgarian volleyball player
- Lilcho Arsov (born 1972), Bulgarian football goalkeeper
- Ljupčo Arsov (1910–1986), Macedonian communist politician
- Milan Arsov (1884–1908), Bulgarian revolutionary from Macedonia
- Petar Poparsov (1868–1941), Bulgarian revolutionary
- Slaveyko Arsov (1877–1904), Bulgarian revolutionary
- Yoncho Arsov (1929–2011), Bulgarian football player and manager
