= Andrew Levin =

Andrew Levin may refer to:

- Andrew T. Levin, American economist
- Andy Levin (born 1960), American politician

== See also ==
- Andres Levin, Venezuelan-American musician
- A+ (rapper) (Andre Levins, born 1982), American hip-hop artist
