= Zoran Stavreski =

Macedonian politician

Minister of Finance
- In office 8 July 2009 – 15 June 2016
- Prime Minister: Nikola Gruevski
- Preceded by: Trajko Slaveski
- Succeeded by: Kiril Minovski

Personal details
- Born: 29 October 1964 (age 61) Ohrid, Yugoslavia (now North Macedonia)
- Party: VMRO-DPMNE
- Education: University of Skopje

Zoran Stavreski (born 29 October 1964 in Ohrid) is a Macedonian politician and formerly Deputy Prime Minister in charge of Finance.

== Education ==
Graduated from the Faculty of Economics of the Ss. Cyril and Methodius University of Skopje in 1987. In 1997 he received the degree of Master of Economics. Fluent in English.

== Career ==
In 1993–2000 he was an advisor and head of the Research Office of the Macedonian National Bank. In 2001 he was undersecretary in the Ministry of Finance. In 2001–2006 he worked in various positions at the World Bank.

== Family ==
Married and has one child.

Political offices
Preceded by Trajko Slaveski	Minister of Finance; 2009–2016	Succeeded by Kiril Minovski
