= Iskra Dimitrova =

Macedonian artist (born 1965)

- Искра Димитрова
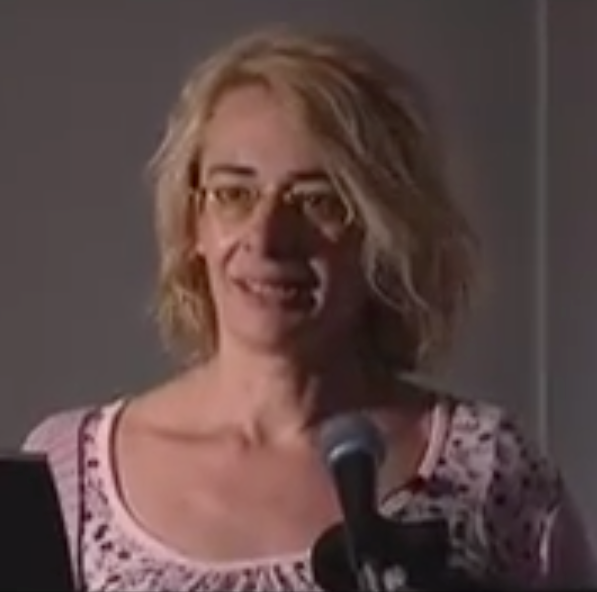
- At the Brooklyn Museum in 2007
- Born: 1965 (age 60–61); Skopje, Yugoslavia
- Education: BA in Philosophy & BFA in Sculpture
- Known for: Abstract, minimalistic, and interpretative multimedia art exhibits, usually centered around the body
- Notable work: Thalamos (1996); Faith, Hope, Love (2014) @Traces (2019)

Iskra Dimitrova (Macedonian: Искра Димитрова; born 1965) is a multimedia artist from the Republic of North Macedonia. Her works investigate the experience of the human body in relation to identity and its environment, emphasizing intimacy and ambiguous meanings in between different spaces. Most often, she is the subject of her own works. While she does not consider herself a feminist artist in the traditional sense, she sees her womanhood as one of the key aspects of her own identity among many others.

Her works have been exhibited in numerous places around the world, including North Macedonia and other countries of former Yugoslavia, the United States, the United Kingdom, Germany, Austria, the Czech Republic, Italy, Greece, Albania, and Japan.

== Biography ==
She was born in 1965 in Skopje, the capital of North Macedonia. She received a BA in Philosophy and a BFA in sculpture from Ss. Cyril and Methodius University of Skopje in 1988 and 1990, respectively. In 1993, she went on a study trip to the United States. Soon afterward, she returned to North Macedonia and established herself as an artist. She currently lives and works in Skopje.

== Career ==
She has presented her work at solo exhibitions and installations in Skopje, Vrsac in Yugoslavia, Zagreb in Croatia, Rochdale in the United Kingdom, Tokyo, Yokohama and Madison, South Dakota. Her work has been included in the Venice Biennial (1999) and at international exhibitions in Maribor, Selestat, Thessalonica, Larisa and Providence, Rhode Island.

== Work ==
A multimedia artist, Dimitrova employs different mediums and styles, often combining them into one installation or series of exhibits. At various points, she has used sculpture and other plastic arts, light displays and video projections, photography, poetry, auditory stimuli, and performance. No matter their form, her works tend to be abstract and minimalistic. Many of Dimitrova’s works emphasize the experience of the observer who travels from one exhibit to the next in a story sequence. Through use of movement and ambiguity, Dimitrova encourages the relationship between the human body and the physical and emotional spaces it inhabits. Dimitrova tries to make the viewer experience a personal interaction with symbolic sensations and mystery.

Body imagery is prominent in many of Dimitrova’s art pieces. In most cases, she uses her own body as a mold or the subject of an exhibit. The human body serves as an instrument to interrogate human perceptions of the world. Through the interaction of multiple mediums, the body becomes a vehicle to demonstrate physical and symbolic transformation. Dimitrova has said that using her own body creates an intimate link to her art, to the point that her art comes to represent herself as an individual.

Dimitrova is also known for using her work for activist purposes. As part of her interest in boundaries and dualistic relationships, she has made several pieces concerning the dynamics between nature and humanity. She has focused on ecological deterioration due to urban development, particularly in her home country. In Faith, Hope, Love (2014), Dimitrova planted several willow trees in the Vardar river in Skopje. Through her artwork, she posits that human culture and nature are intertwined, rather than separate, calling for a reconsideration of how humans view ecological environments through the titular values. Faith, Hope, Love came under attack from several parts of the media as well as politicians, but it remained in place as part of the “Skopje 2014” infrastructure project.

== Exhibitions ==
Dimitrova has held many solo exhibitions, and she has participated in numerous group exhibitions around the world.

=== Solo exhibitions ===
Sources:

- 1991-1994: Skopje, North Macedonia
- 1993: Madison, USA
- 1996: Vršac, Serbia; Rochdale, UK; Zagreb, Croatia
- 1997: Museum of Contemporary Art, Skopje, North Macedonia
- 1998: Skopje, North Macedonia
- 1999: Venice, Italy
- 2000: Skopje, North Macedonia
- 2003: Tokyo, Japan
- 2004: Yokohama, Japan
- 2006: Skopje, North Macedonia
- 2008: Štip, North Macedonia

=== Group exhibitions ===
Sources:

- 1994: International Festival, Sofia, Bulgaria
- 1996: 5th International Biennial, Maribor, Slovenia
- 1996: Liquor amnii – Macedonian and American women artists, Skopje, North Macedonia
- 1997: Liquor amnii – Macedonian and American women artists, Providence, USA
- 1997: Biennial of Contemporary Art, Sélestat, France,
- 1997: Women artists between the Two Seas, Thessaloniki, Greece
- 1998: New Macedonian Art – Radiations, Skopje, North Macedonia
- 1999: After the Wall, Moderna Museet, Stockholm, Sweden
- 1999: Brown Sugar, Nuremberg, Germany
- 1999: Narcissismѕ, Museum of Contemporary Art, Skopje, North Macedonia
- 1999: Onufri, Tirana, Albania
- 2000: New Macedonian Art – Radiations, Tokyo, Japan
- 2002: Urban Gene, Tachikawa International Art Festival, Japan
- 2007: Global Feminisms, Brooklyn Museum, New York, USA
- 2007: super(h)EROS, National Gallery of Macedonia, Skopje, North Macedonia
- 2009: Venezia via MKC, Skopje, North Macedonia and Vienna, Austria
- 2009: Synesthesia, Austrian Parliament, Vienna, Austria
- 2009: Gender CheCk, MUMOK – Museum Moderner Kunst Stiftung Ludwig, Vienna, Austria
- 2014: Solidarity, Museum of Contemporary Art, Skopje, North Macedonia
- 2014: Transfiguring – Imago mundi, Contemporary Macedonian Art, Czech Center, Prague, Czech Republic
- 2016: Treviso Museum, Italy, 2016
