= Maja Hill =

Macedonian artist (born 1976)

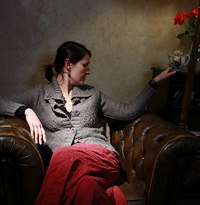
- Maja Hill
- Born: Maja Dzartovska; 26 January 1976 (age 50); Skopje, Yugoslavia (present-day North Macedonia)
- Education: Ss. Cyril and Methodius University of Skopje, Skopje, Macedonia
- Known for: Painting, Drawing, Photography, Sculpture, Performance, Film, Academia
- Spouse: Benjamin Hill (2003– )

Maja Hill (born Maja Dzartovska on 26 January 1976) is a Macedonian artist and painter.

Hill was born in Skopje, Yugoslavia (now North Macedonia) in 1976, she currently works and lives in the UK. While her oeuvre largely consists of oil paintings, notably portraits and cityscapes she is known for working across a range of artistic disciplines. She has exhibited extensively in the Balkans and internationally including London, New York and Paris.

Hill in her paintings presents the city, people and everything that happens on the streets and pavements. Hill (then Maja Dzartovska) graduated at the Fine Arts Academy in the class of Professor Simon Semov. Ss. Cyril and Methodius University of Skopje, Skopje 1999.

In 2000 Hill won the portrait award at the National Society of Macedonian Artists (DLUM) annual exhibition. In the autumn of that year held her first open solo exhibition in the Gallery of the City Skopje. It consisted of 70 paintings. From here Hill went on to make a career as an artist, mostly through portrait commissions but also through other art related projects including book art and collaborating in a UN project to deliver art training to underprivileged Roma (gypsy) children.

Hill often paints oil on canvas however she also makes mosaics and fresco and computer animation. Typical for her work are portraits and landscapes characterized with a great deal of hyperrealism. The artist graduated from the Faculty of Fine Art in Skopje. She continued education at Southampton University and has had ten solo shows in New York, London, Paris etc. She has also taken part in numerous group exhibitions.

In 2002, she moved to Paris to enter the Cité internationale des arts and to exhibit and work in the city. Hill then moved again to the UK to undertake her post-graduate degree incorporating her developing interest in animation and digital interactive art.

Hill now lives in the United Kingdom, and exhibits both there and in Europe; for several years she has also worked in creating digital images, in 3-D under the auspices of Project Labyrinth, Little Louise and a variety of 2-D animation projects.

== Sources ==
- Culture and Information Centre, Skopje 2008
- International Skopje Art Colony 2009
- Ramazotti International Art Colony, Ohrid Macedonia 2008
- Culture Republic of Macedonia
