= Georgi Efremov =

Macedonian scientist (1932–2011)

Georgi D. Efremov
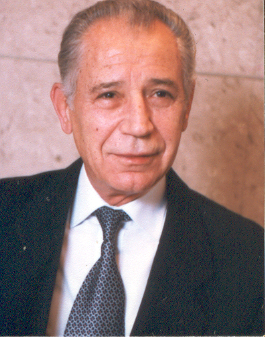
- Born: 8 December 1932; Kratovo, Yugoslavia (now North Macedonia)
- Died: 6 May 2011 (aged 78); Skopje, Republic of Macedonia (now North Macedonia)
- Citizenship: Republic of Macedonia
- Known for: molecular biology, genetic engineering, GMO
- Scientific career
- Institutions: Research Laboratory for Genetic Engineering and Biotechnology and Ss. Cyril and Methodius University of Skopje
- Academic advisors: Titus H.J. Huisman

Georgi D. Efremov (8 December 1932 – 6 May 2011) was a Macedonian academic and scientist at the Macedonian Academy of Sciences and Arts, Skopje, Macedonia, and a professor in the Faculty of Agricultural Science and Food in Skopje. He was specialized in genetic engineering in human medicine, veterinary medicine, and animal biotechnology. He was a former Ambassador and Minister of Science in the Republic of Macedonia.

Efremov was born in the small town of Kratovo, Republic of Macedonia, one of the oldest towns in Europe on December 8, 1932. His father was a merchant wholesalesman, one of the wealthiest men in the town, until 1945, when the new communist regime of the former Yugoslavia confiscated all of his property. His parents taught their children that education was the only way to a better life.

He started his higher education at the University of Zagreb, Faculty of Veterinary Medicine in Croatia. In 1956 he graduated, and during the next two years he served as a veterinarian, later enrolling at the Ss. Cyril and Methodius University, Faculty of Medicine in Macedonia. After he finished his studies there, he was appointed as junior assistant in physiology of domestic animals at the Faculty of Agriculture and Food in Skopje.

In 1960, he specialized with a Master of Science in physiology and biochemistry at the University of Belgrade with help from his mentor, Professor Bozidar Nikolic. After his master's studies, Efremov defended his doctoral thesis, titled "Fetal and Adult Animal Hemoglobins," in September 1963 at the University of Belgrade.

After his Ph.D. dissertation he began work as a professor at the Department of Internal Medicine, Veterinary College of Norway in Oslo, which was headed by Professor Mikael Braed. Two years later he was invited by Professor Titus H.J. Huisman to join his group at the Medical College of Georgia (Augusta, Georgia, USA), which was studying the structure, function, synthesis, and expression of normal and abnormal human hemoglobin.

After he returned from the United States two years later, he was appointed to a position at the Macedonian Academy of Sciences and Arts, where he founded the Research Laboratory for Genetic Engineering and Biotechnology, and where he also served as director.
