= Christina Kramer =

Canadian linguist

Christina Elizabeth Kramer
- Education: University of North Carolina at Chapel Hill (PhD, MA); Beloit College (BA)
- Occupations: Professor, Slavic Linguistics
- Employer: University of Toronto

Christina Elizabeth Kramer is Professor Emerita of Slavic and Balkan languages and linguistics at the University of Toronto and a literary translator.

== Education and career ==
- 1975: B.A. Russian and comparative literature, Beloit College, Beloit, Wisconsin
- 1980: M.A. Slavic Languages and Literatures, University of North Carolina at Chapel Hill
- 1983: Ph.D. University of North Carolina at Chapel Hill

Kramer worked as a translator for Berlitz Translation Service for some time, translating documents from Bulgarian, Macedonian, Russian, Serbo-Croatian, and Turkish.

Early in her career Kramer taught Russian and Spanish at Murray State University in Kentucky.

Kramer joined the University of Toronto faculty in 1986. She was promoted to full professor in May 2001 and retired in June 2019.

== Scholarly work ==
Kramer is a specialist on Balkan languages, specifically on South Slavic languages, with a particular focus on Macedonian. Her research has focused on synchronic linguistics, sociolinguistics, verbal categories, language and politics.

Kramer authored Macedonian: A Course for Beginning and Intermediate Students. The book – first published in 1999, was revised and expanded in 2003 and 2011. The second edition won the 2006 AATSEEL book prize: Best Contribution to Language Pedagogy.

She is a noted translator of literature from Macedonian, receiving a Literature Translation Fellowship from the NEA in 2013 and 2018. Information on her translations is available at http://www.christinakramertranslator.ca.

Kramer co-invented the language "Lavinian" for Nicolas Billon's play Butcher.

== Publications ==
- Christina E. Kramer (2026) Postcards of Skopje: Shifting Sightlines, Changing Viewpoint
- Christina E. Kramer (2003) Macedonian (Makedonski Jazik): A Course for Beginning and Intermediate Students. and Audio Supplement Revised and expanded third edition. University of Wisconsin Press. September 2011. ISBN 978-0-299-24764-5
- Christina E. Kramer/Brian Cook (1999) Guard the Word Well Bound: Proceedings of the Third North American-Macedonian Conference on Macedonian Studies. Slavica Pub: Indiana Slavic Papers, vol. 10 (1999). ISBN 978-9991972534
- Eran Fraenkel (Author), Christina Kramer (Editor) (1993): Language Contact-Language Conflict (Balkan Studies). Peter Lang Publishing. ISBN 978-0-8204-1652-6
- Christina E. Kramer (1986) Analytic Modality in Macedonian. (Slavistische Beiträge) Munich: Verlag Otto Sagner. ISBN 978-3-87690-343-9
- Christina Kramer (1985) Makedonsko-Angliski Razgovornik (Macedonian-English Phrasebook). Skopje: Seminar za makedonksi jazik.

== Translations ==
Christina E. Kramer's translations of several Bulgarian and Macedonian novels by Luan Starova, Goce Smilevski, Lidija Dimkovska, Petar Andonovski, Aco Šopov, and Aleko Konstantinov have been published by the University of Wisconsin Press, Parthian Books, Autumn Hill Books, Deep Vellum, Istros Books, Two Lines Press and Penguin Books.
