= Starov =

Starov, feminine Starova is a Russian surname. Notable people with the surname include:

- Ivan Starov (1745–1808), Russian architect
- Mykhailo Starov, Ukrainian strongman
