= Fatmir Besimi =

Albanian-Macedonian politician

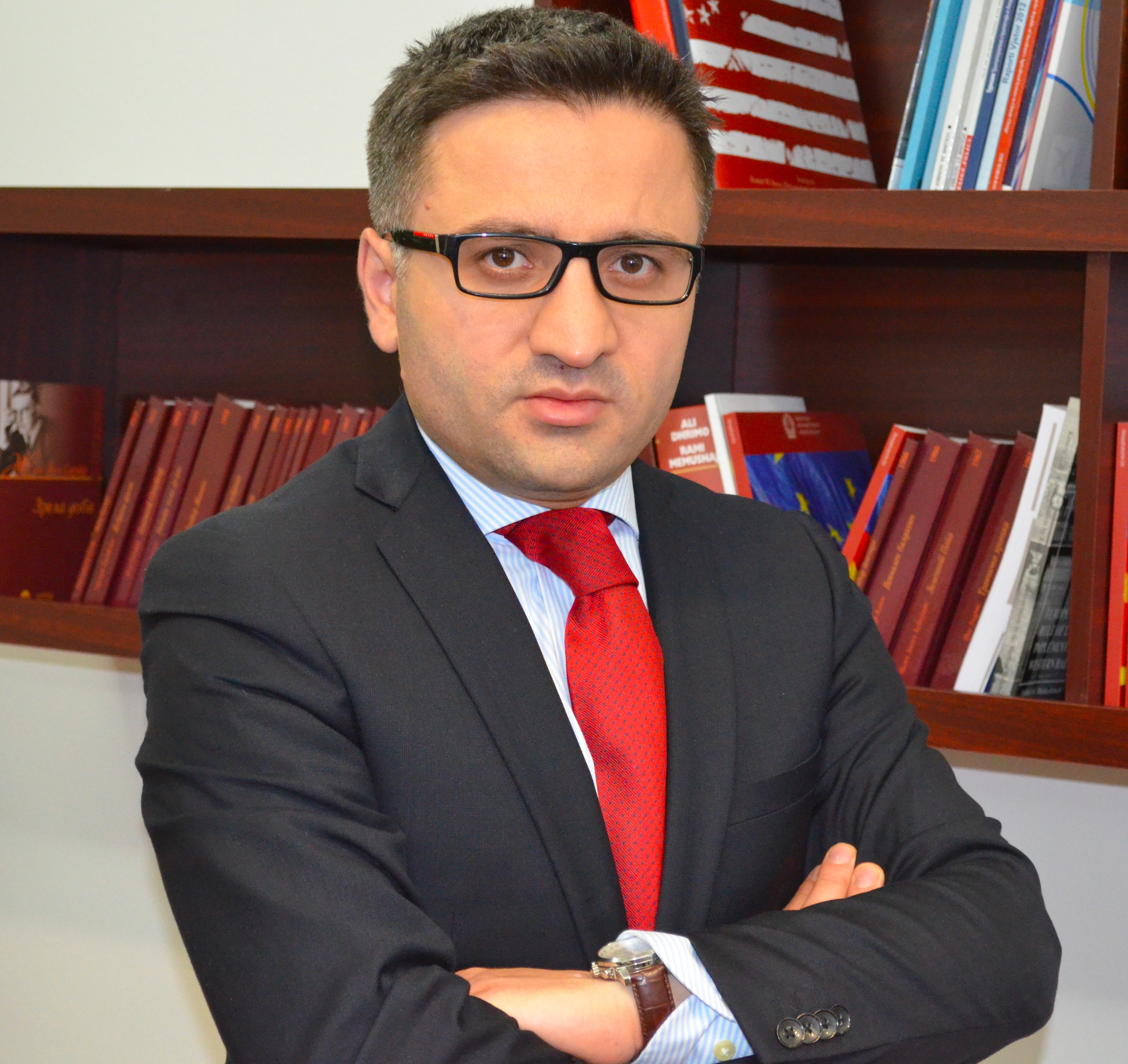

Minister of Finance in North Macedonia
- In office 30 August 2020 – 23 June 2024
- Preceded by: Nina Angelovska
- Succeeded by: Gordana Dimitrieska-Kočoska

Deputy Prime Minister of the Government of the Republic of Macedonia in charge of European Affairs
- In office 18 February 2013 – 4 April 2016

Minister of Defence
- In office 28 July 2011 – 18 February 2013
- Preceded by: Zoran Konjanovski
- Succeeded by: Talat Xhaferi

Personal details
- Born: 18 November 1975 (age 50) Tetovo, SR Macedonia, SFR Yugoslavia (now North Macedonia)
- Citizenship: Macedonian
- Party: Democratic Union for Integration

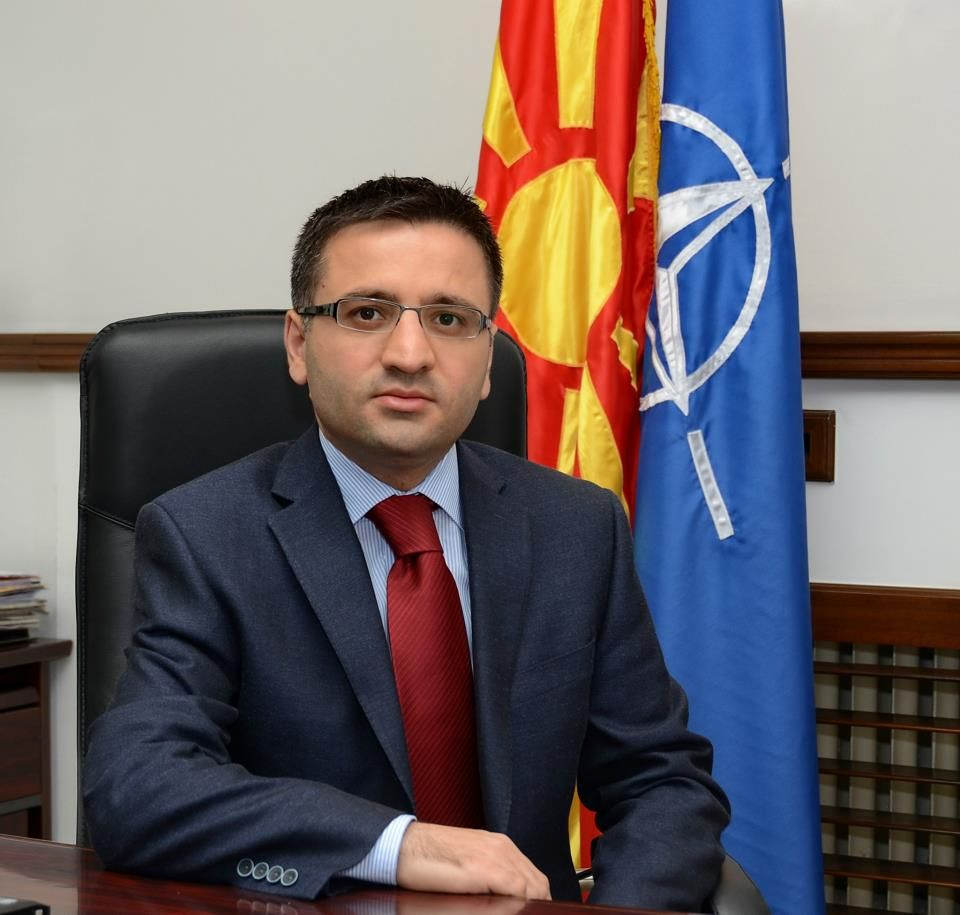
Fatmir Besimi Minister of Defense 2011–2013

Fatmir Besimi (Macedonian: Фатмир Бесими; born 18 November 1975) is a Macedonian politician and economist of Albanian ethnicity. He served as Minister of Finance in North Macedonia from 2020 to 2024. He also served twice as Minister of Economy (December 2004 – June 2006 and August 2008 – July 2011) then Minister of Defence (August 2011 – February 2013) and after that he was Deputy Prime Minister of the Government of the Republic of Macedonia in charge of European Affairs (March 2013 – March 2016). In 2010 he was selected as one of the top European Ministers in the group of Young Global Leaders by World Economic Forum.

== Early life and education ==
Fatmir Besimi was born in Tetovo, North Macedonia. Besimi is an ethnic Albanian. He attended school in Tetovo and studied economics at the Ss. Cyril and Methodius University of Skopje. His research thesis was on the subject “Monetary and Exchange Rate Policy in the Republic of Macedonia during the Process of Accession to the European Union". During his studies he was a scholar of the Fund for talented students of the Ministry of Education of Republic of Macedonia, as well as user of the joint scholarship of University of Staffordshire, Great Britain and Open Society Institute, Hungary.

== Career ==
In 2001 he worked in the Research Directorate in the National Bank of the Republic of Macedonia. From 2002 to 2003 he was Director of the Public Enterprise for Airport Services, after which he was selected as Vice-Governor of the National Bank of Republic of Macedonia. In December 2004 he was appointed Minister of Economy in the Government of the Republic of Macedonia. After completing his mandate as Minister of Economy he was engaged as an economist in the World Bank Office in Kosovo in 2007. In 2008 he received a second mandate as Minister of Economy. After the early parliamentary elections in 2011 he became the Minister of Defence in the Government of the Republic of Macedonia (the first minister from ethnical Albanian community in this position) and during that period he was a member of the National Security Council of the Republic of Macedonia. Since February 2013 Besimi was appointed as Deputy Prime Minister in charge for the European Affairs in the Government of the Republic of Macedonia.

Fatmir Besimi has an active university engagement through lectures in the field of economics and global development in the post-graduate studies in the University of South-Eastern Europe in Tetovo from 2008, upon which he previously held lectures in the University Riinvest in Pristina in 2007. Besimi is the author of two books in the English language and several professional and academic articles in the field of economics and politics published in English, Albanian and Macedonian in journals in the Republic of Macedonia and abroad.

In the framework of his public and state functions, Besimi was leading several governmental projects and activities, such as: Business Environment Reform and Institutional Strengthening, project by the World Bank (2005-2010); Membership of the Republic of Macedonia in CEFTA (2006); Reforms in the energy sector, restructuring of the electricity company and privatization of the electricity distribution company (2004-2006); Founding of the International Renewable Energy Agency (2009); Chairing the Energy Community of South-Eastern Europe (2010) and other strategies, projects and activities, as well as signing over ten international agreements and protocols. As Minister of Defense he was participating in the adoption of the new formation of the Army of Republic of Macedonia in accordance with NATO standards, in the promotion of Smart Defense Concept in the regional cooperation as well as the adoption of the Defense Diplomacy Strategy, Communication Strategy, ARM Equal Representation Program (promotion of the equal representation of the ethnic communities as inclusive process promoting the diversity as advantage), Gender Equality Committee, transformation of the Military Museum in Museum for Peace, Defense and Security, establishment of “Gallery of Nobel Peace Prize Winners and ARM for Peace” and other initiatives. In 2012, when he was minister of defence, he honoured killed NLA rebels at Slupčane along with other ethnic Albanian ministers, which was criticised by Macedonian president Gjorge Ivanov.

Political offices
Preceded by Zoran Konjanovski	Minister of Defense; 2011-2013	Succeeded by Talat Xhaferi
Preceded by Nina Angelovska	Minister of Finance; 2020-2024	Succeeded by Gordana Dimitrieska-Kočoska
