= Andrew T. Levin =

Academic background
- Alma mater: Stanford University; Yale University

Academic work
- Discipline: Monetary Economics
- Institutions: Dartmouth College, Professor of Economics
- Website: https://sites.dartmouth.edu/alevin/; Information at IDEAS / RePEc

Andrew T. Levin is a professor of economics at Dartmouth College and previously served numerous roles at the Federal Reserve Board.

== Background and research ==
Levin's research in monetary economics has been published in many top economic journals such as the American Economic Review and the Journal of Monetary Economics. He is ranked among the top 200 economists in the world in terms of total citations. In addition to his research, he teaches undergraduate courses at Dartmouth College. Levin is also a regular visiting scholar at the IMF He often provides commentary on a wide range of media sources including Bloomberg, The Wall Street Journal, and Politico.

Much of Levin's career was spent at the Federal Reserve Board from 1992 to 2012, where he occupied a variety of roles and ended as a Special Adviser to the Board on monetary policy strategy and communications.

Levin was previously an assistant professor of economics at the University of California, San Diego from 1989 to 1992. He has consulted for the European Central Bank and been a visiting scholar for the Bank of Japan and the Dutch National Bank. He has also provided technical assistance to the Bank of Albania, National Bank of the Republic of Macedonia, Bank of Ghana, Central Bank of Argentina, and National Bank of Ukraine. Levin has also served as an external advisor to the Bank of Korea and as a scientific advisor to Norges Bank and Sveriges Riksbank (the central banks of Norway and Sweden, respectively).

== Education ==
Levin graduated summa cum laude from Yale University in 1984 with a B.A. in Economics and Mathematics and from Stanford University in 1989 with a Ph.D. in economics.

== Bibliography ==
- Christopher J. Erceg; Mr. Andrew Levin (16 December 2013). Labor Force Participation and Monetary Policy in the Wake of the Great Recession. International Monetary Fund. ISBN 978-1-4843-0260-6.
