= Macedonian Journal of Medical Sciences =

The Macedonian Journal of Medical Sciences (print: ISSN 1857-5749, online: ISSN 1857-5773) is an open-access peer-reviewed medical journal published quarterly by the Institute of Immunobiology and Human Genetics (Faculty of Medicine, Ss. Cyril and Methodius University of Skopje) since 2008.

== Abstracting and indexing ==
The journal is abstracted and indexed in CAB Direct/Global Health database, EBSCO databases, EMBASE, and Scopus.

== See also ==
- Open Access Scholarly Publishers Association, of which MJMS is a member
