= Macedonian Journal of Chemistry and Chemical Engineering =

Scientific journal of chemistry

- Discipline: Chemistry
- Language: English, Macedonian
- Edited by: Zoran Zdravkovski

Publication details
- Former names: Bulletin of the Chemists and Technologists of Macedonia, Гласник на хемичарите и технолозите на Македонија
- History: 1974–present
- Publisher: Society of Chemists and Technologists of Macedonia & Ss. Cyril and Methodius University of Skopje (North Macedonia)
- Frequency: Biannually
- Open access: Yes
- License: CC-BY-NC 4.0
- Impact factor: 1.1 (2023)

Standard abbreviations
- ISO 4: Maced. J. Chem. Chem. Eng.

Indexing
- CODEN: MJCCA9
- ISSN: 1857-5552 (print); 1857-5625 (web)
- OCLC no.: 643343122

Links
- Journal homepage; Online access; Online archive

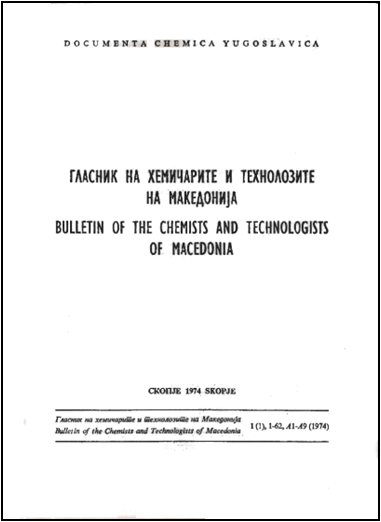
The cover of the journal’s first publication

The Macedonian Journal of Chemistry and Chemical Engineering is a biannual peer-reviewed scientific journal of chemistry established in 1974 by the Society of Chemists and Technologists of Macedonia. Since 2022 it is co-published with the Ss. Cyril and Methodius University of Skopje. It consists of two parts: The first, larger part contains peer-reviewed scientific articles from the various fields of chemistry and chemical engineering, written in English and accompanied by abstracts in Macedonian. The second part, written in Macedonian or in English, contains society and related news.

The journal was first published as the Bulletin of the Chemists and Technologists of Macedonia in 1974, and obtained its current name in 2007. The journal and the articles published since 2006 are available online. It is a diamond open access journal, neither the readers nor the authors pay any fees.

== Editors-in-chief ==
The following persons have been editors-in-chief:

- Bojan Šoptrajanov (1974)
- Svetomir Hadži-Jordanov (1989)
- Gligor Jovanovski (1993)
- Maja Cvetkovska (1997)
- Trajče Stafilov (2001)
- Eleonora Winkelhausen (2005)
- Zoran Zdravkovski (2009)
