= Krste Misirkov Institute for the Macedonian Language =

Regulatory body of the Macedonian language

- Established: 1953
- Address: Grigor Prlichev 5, 1000 Skopje
- Location: Skopje, North Macedonia
- Coordinates: 41.997807°N 21.443987°E
- Interactive map of Krste Misirkov Institute for the Macedonian Language
- Website: http://www.imj.ukim.edu.mk/en.aspx

The Krste Misirkov Institute for the Macedonian Language (Macedonian: Институт за македонски јазик „Крсте Мисирков“, Institut za makedonski jazik „Krste Misirkov“) is the regulatory body of the Macedonian language and is a part of Ss. Cyril and Methodius University of Skopje, North Macedonia. The institute was established in March 1953 in order to standardise the Macedonian language and to organise creative potentials in the sphere of Macedonian studies. It is also used to ensure professional training and improvement towards those teaching the language. It was then that the Act of the Ministry of Education of the Government of the then Socialist Republic of Macedonia for transforming the Department of the Macedonian Language and Literature at the Institute of Folklore into an autonomous Institute of the Macedonian Language was empowered. At first the Institute functioned as a component part of the Faculty of Philosophy, but soon it turned into a separate scholarly institution with independent financing.

== Departments ==
Today, the Institute consists of 5 scholarly departments:

- Department of the history of the Macedonian language
- Department of contemporary Macedonian
- Department of dialectology
- Department of Macedonian lexicology and lexicography
- Department of onomastics

Research fellows from the department of the history of the Macedonian language have been working on the Dictionary of Church-Slavonic project; research fellows from the department of the contemporary Macedonian language have been working on the Intentional Syntax Dictionary of Macedonian Verbs project; research fellows from the department of dialectology have been working on the Macedonian Dialect Atlas; research fellows from the department of Macedonian lexicology and lexicography have been working on the Interpretative Dictionary of the Macedonian Language project and on the subproject Dictionary of Macedonian Folk Poetry; research fellows from the department of onomastics have been working on the Dictionary of Macedonian Family Names project.

At present, the scientific and research activities of the Institute are carried by 33 researchers, 6 of whom are research advisers, 1 senior research fellow, 1 research fellow, 6 assistants, 9 researchers and 9 junior researchers. 9 of them are doctors of science and 15 are masters of science.

== See also ==
- Ss. Cyril and Methodius University of Skopje
