= Elizabeta Dimitrova =

- Born: 28 July 1962; Skopje, Yugoslavia, Socialist Republic of Macedonia
- Education: Ss. Cyril and Methodius University of Skopje, University of Belgrade
- Known for: art history
- Scientific career
- Fields: Byzantine studies, art history
- Academic advisors: Jovanka Maksimovic, Ivan M. Djordjevic

Elizabeta Dimitrova (Macedonian: Елизабета Димитрова, born 28 July 1962 in Skopje), is a Macedonian art historian, Byzantinist and professor.

== Professional life ==
Elizabeta Dimitrova has a BA degree in art history (1986) and won the Franz Manning academic award as the best student of the faculty of philosophy in the 1976 to 1986 decade, as well as best student of Ss. Cyril and Methodius University of Skopje in 1986. From 1989 to 1990, she attended advanced classes at University of Vienna as a holder of the Johann Gottfried Herder scholarship. Her MA degree and PhD were obtained at the University of Belgrade in 1993 (supervisor of the master thesis: Professor Jovanka Maksimovic, PhD) and 1998 (supervisor of the doctoral thesis: Professor Ivan M. Djordjevic, PhD). In 1998, she was a holder of the Mary Chonhoff scholarship at Arizona State University in Tempe giving visiting lectures.

In 1987, she began her academic career at the Faculty of Philosophy, in 2008 being given the title of full professor. From 2001 to 2002, she won a certificate for organization and management of summer schools and professional trainings from the Central European University in Budapest. In the course of 2004 to 2011, she was a director of the avant-garde Ohrid Summer University (organized by the Euro Balkan Institute), organizing the first summer school in Byzantine art history (2002). She is a permanent member of the editorial board of the archeological journal Folia Archaeologica Balkanica published by the Faculty of Philosophy in honor of eminent archaeological authorities of the 20th and 21st centuries.

== Scholarly activities ==
As a scholar, Elizabeta Dimitrova is committed to the investigation of artistic production, culture, as well as socio-cultural features of the Early Christian and Byzantine epochs. In that context, she was the first to identify and disclose the program, iconographic and aesthetic characteristics of the terracotta icons from the archeological site of the Vinica, North Macedonia Fortress which, in the 1990s became one of the main archeological attractions of the Balkan area. Also, she has identified the program and iconographic concept of the fresco painting in the Episcopal basilica at the archeological site of Stobi (fragmented portions preserved from the 4th century). A significant part of her scholarly papers are dedicated to the analysis and contextualisation of the symbolic dimensions of the iconography depicted on early Christian mosaic pavements in the archeological sites: Stobi, Heraclea Lyncestis and ancient Lychnidos. In that regard, she has given special attention to the models of visualization of the dogmatic messages through the symbolic language of artistic expression from the 3rd to 6th centuries (Roman catacombs, Ravenna mosaic pavements, sculpture and architectural decoration in the Mediterranean region). In the sphere of Byzantine painterly culture, Dimitrova has published a monograph on the church dedicated to the Dormition of the Virgin in the village of Matejče (the largest medieval fresco ensemble in the territory of North Macedonia). She has contextualized the fresco arrangements in a certain number of medieval sacral monuments in the region of North Macedonia (Holy Mother of God at Veljusa and St. Leontius at Vodoča from the 11th century, St. Panteleimon at Nerezi and St. George at Kurbinovo the 12th century, Marko's monastery and St. Andreas in the gorge of Matka from the 14th century). In the scope of her investigation of medieval cultural history, she has put a particular accent on the socio-cultural dimensions of khtetorial arrangements commissioned by state and ecclesiastical authorities, as well as analysis of the painterly/aesthetic features of the Balkans' fresco and icon workshops in 13th and 14th century. She has participated in 53 conferences (most of them international) and conducted 29 international research and operative projects.

== Bibliography ==
- "The Ceramic Reliefs from the Vinica Kale", 1993 (in Macedonian) (1995 in English)
- "The Earliest Christian Symbols", 1995 (in Macedonian)
- "The Vinica Terracotas", 2000 (in Macedonian)
- "Medieval Frescoes in Macedonia" (in Macedonian)
- "The Matejče Monastery", 2002 (in Macedonian)
- "Macedonia. L’arte medioevale", 2006 Milan, Skopje, Paris (in Italian, Macedonian and French) in co-authorship with S. Korunovski
- "Ohrid. Treasury of the world", Skopje 2007 (in Macedonian and English)
- "Skopje. Seven Monuments of Art and Architecture", 2010 (in Macedonian and English)
- "Ohrid sub specie aeternitatis (Ohrid 2010)" (in Macedonian) in co-authorship with P. Kuzman
- "Painting and Architecture in Medieval Macedonia", Skopje 2011 (in English)
- "Matka. Cultural Heritage", Skopje 2011 (in Macedonian), in co-authorship with V. Lilcikj, K. Antevska and A. Vasilevski
- "The Vinica Mystery. The Ceramic Treasuries of a Late Antique Fortress", Vinica 2012 (in Macedonian and English)
- "The Painterly Horizons of the Frescoes of the Episcopal Basilica: Iconographic Design, Symbolic Configuration, Stylistic Modularities, Early Christian Wall Paintings from the Episcopal Basilica in Stobi", Stobi 2012 (in English)
- "Macedonia. Millennia of cultural and historical facts", Skopje 2013 (in Macedonian)
- "Seven Medieval Churches in the Republic of Macedonia"", Skopje 2014 (in English) in co-authorship with G. Velkov
- "The Church of Saint Panteleimon at Nerezi", Skopje 2015 (in English)
- "The Church of Saint George at Kurbinovo", Skopje 2016 (in English)
- "The Church of the Virgin Eleoussa at Veljusa", Skopje 2016 (in English)
- "The Church of the Holy Mother of God at Matejče", Skopje 2016 (in English)
- "The Terracotta Relief Plaques from Vinica", Skopje 2016 (in English)
- "Perception of Beauty (with co-authors)", Rijeka 2017 (in English)
- "Skopje. Eight Millennia of Life, Culture and Creation, Skopje 2019 (in Macedonian)
- "Seven Churches in the Region of Pelagonia and Prespa", Skopje 2019 (in English)
- "The Church of Saint Demetrius (King Marko’s Monastery), at Sushica", Skopje 2020 (in English)
- "The Church of Saint Andreas in the Gorge of Matka", Skopje 2020 (in English)
