= Džordže Arsov =

Macedonian politician (born 1946)

Džordže Arsov (Macedonian: Џорџе Арсов; born 1946) is a former mayor of the municipality of Kisela Voda. He was born in 1946 in Strumica, then in SFR Yugoslavia. He finished primary and secondary education in his home town and completed his graduate studies in Skopje. In 1970, he graduated with honors from the faculty of mechanical engineering, St.Cyril and Methodius University (Macedonian: Универзитет „Св. Кирил и Методиј“- Скопје) in Skopje and started to work as a professor at the high school ASUC in Skopje. After four years at ASUC and as a deputy director of the school, he left and started to work in the newly established trading and marketing department of the Metalski Zavod Tito (MZT). Under his management, the department became a leader in its sector and became its own independent organization MZT Commerce, employing approximately 140 people and responsible for over 90% of the revenues of MZT. This trading and marketing organization became an initiator for association of all commercial services of MZT in the process opening many offices in former Yugoslavia as well as in Moscow, Sofia, Frankfurt, Berlin, New York, and 12 other places around the world. MZT Commerce, under Arsov's leadership, also became an exclusive representative of many firms from former Yugoslavia for the Western European, U.S., and Middle Eastern markets. Arsov was the President and managing director of the MZT Commerce until 1991.

In 1991, Arsov started his own trading business in oil and oil derivatives as well as secondary raw and precious materials. By 1998 his business interests enlarged, and he established his own financial consulting and investment advisory firm that specialized in representing domestic companies in search for foreign investors as well as the reactivation of the previously closed factories that were in the process of privatization in the Republic of Macedonia.

Arsov has lived in Kisela Voda for 40 years. He has been married to Margita Arsova for more than 30 years and is a father of two children.

Arsov became the mayor of the municipality of Kisela Voda in March 2005 as a member of the political party of VMRO–DPMNE.

Arsov is a President of the Commission for Financing of Municipalities (ZELS). As a member of ZELS, he is also a member of the Commission for Financing of Municipalities at the Government of the North Macedonia.
