= Elena Filipovska =

Macedonian philogist, teacher and writer

- Born: Elena Filipovska; Skopje, Yugoslavia
- Education: Skopje University
- Children: 2

Elena Filipovska (also known as Elena Filipovska-Božinovska) is a Macedonian philologist, a teacher of Italian and Macedonian for foreigners, and a writer.

== Biography ==
Elena has completed two types of undergraduate studies. One in the area of linguistics at the Ss. Cyril and Methodius University in Skopje, and the other in the area of history and civilization at the ICoN Consortium. In addition, she has completed her master studies at the Blaže Koneski Faculty of Philology, and the topic of her Master’s thesis is “Interculturality in the process of foreign language teaching”. She has shown interest in the link between language and culture, as well as in discovering novel methods for teaching foreign languages. She has carried out research at the University of California, Berkeley and she has worked on a number of projects for promoting foreign language teaching.

Filipovska has been working as a teacher and researcher since 2001. As a teacher of Italian and Macedonian for foreigners, she has taught in a number of private and state educational centres, including the LinguaLink school of languages, the Josip Broz-Tito secondary school in Skopje and the Blaže Koneski Faculty of Philology. Since 2014 she has focused solely on Macedonian, and she established Skazalka – a school for teaching Macedonian to foreigners.

In 2021 she has published her grammar of Macedonian for foreigners, entitled Macedonian Learner’s Grammar. Apart from the grammar, she has also published a number of texts and articles in the area of teaching methodology.

== Literary work ==
Filipovska published her first fiction in 2020, the dystopian novel Idol on the Wall.
