= Goce Smilevski =

Macedonian novelist

Goce Smilevski (born 1975) is a Macedonian writer. He was born in Skopje. He studied at the Sts Kiril and Metodij University in Skopje, at Charles University in Prague and at the Central European University in Budapest. Two of his novels have been translated into English: Conversation with Spinoza which won the Macedonian Novel of the Year Award in 2003, and Freud's Sister, which won the EU Prize for Literature in 2010.

He also co-wrote the movie Mother which is a fictional account of the early years of Mother Teresa's life.
