= Taki Fiti =

Macedonian politician (born 1950)

Taki Fiti Таки Фити

4th Minister of Finance of North Macedonia
- In office 23 Feb 1996 – 30 Nov 1998
- Preceded by: Jane Miljovski
- Succeeded by: Boris Stojmenov

Personal details
- Born: Taki Fiti; November 7, 1950 (age 75) Krushevo, Yugoslavia today North Macedonia

Taki Fiti (Macedonian: Таки Фити) is an economist and former Minister of Finance of North Macedonia.

== Biography ==
Taki Fiti was born on 7 November 1950 in Kruševo, North Macedonia. He is an ethnic Aromanian. He received his MA in 1980, and his Ph.D. in 1983 at the Faculty of Economics in Skopje. From 1996 - 1998, he was Minister of Finance of North Macedonia. He is currently Head of the Centre for Strategic Research, Macedonian Academy of Sciences and Arts (MANU).

The scope of his scientific interests includes economics, economic growth and development, state regulation, international capital flow, and entrepreneurship. He is author and co-author of 19 books, of which more important are: "Transnational companies and export of capital", "Modern capitalism", "Entrepreneurship and entrepreneurship management", "Economy - microeconomic approach", and "Economy - macroeconomic approach".

Political offices
Preceded by Jane Miljovski	Minister of Finance; 1996–1998	Succeeded by Boris Stojmenov
