= Veljusa =

Veljusa Вељуса
- Village
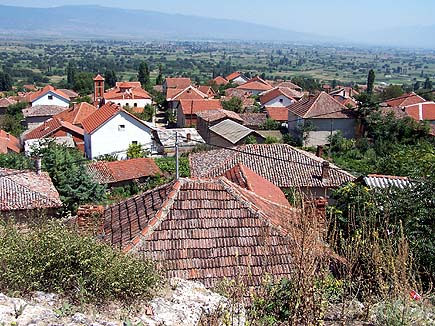
- Rooftops in Veljusa

- Location within North Macedonia
- Country: North Macedonia
- Region: Southeastern
- Municipality: Strumica

Population (2002)
  - Total: 1,552
- Time zone: UTC+1 (CET)
  - Summer (DST): UTC+2 (CEST)
- Website: .

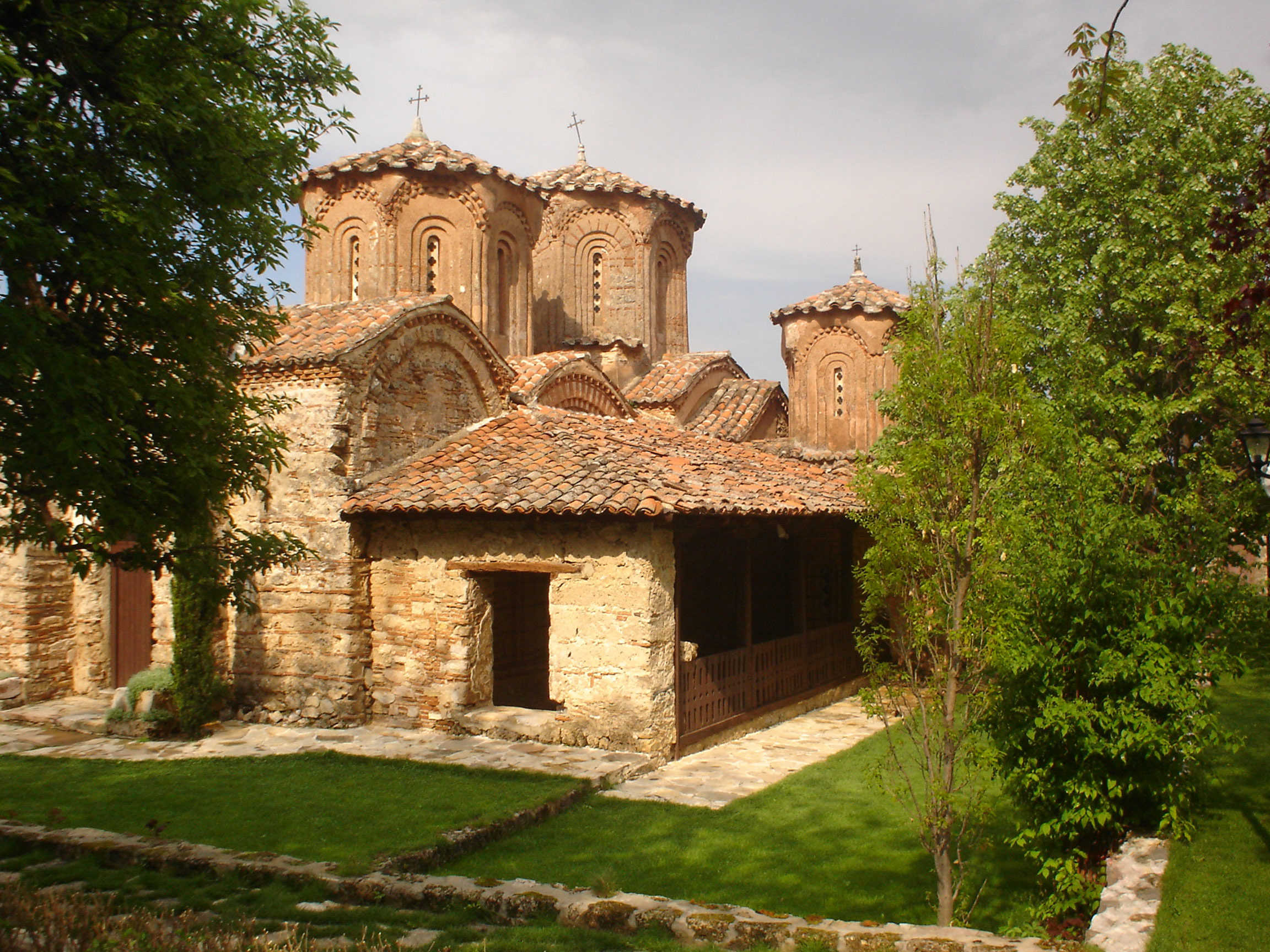

Veljusa (Macedonian: Вељуса, pronounced "Vel-yusa") is a village in the municipality of Strumica, North Macedonia. The village is situated on the slopes of Mount Elenica and is best known for the 11th century monastery, Holy Mother of God.

It is known for growing cherries, apples, as well as other fruit trees and vegetables.

== Demographics ==
According to the 2002 census, the village had a total of 1,552 inhabitants. Ethnic groups in the village include:

- Macedonians 1,548
- Serbs 4

As of 2021, the village of veljusa has 890 inhabitants and the ethnic composition was the following:

- Macedonians – 802
- Person without Data - 88
