= Gëzime Starova =

Albanian jurist and professor from North Macedonia

Gëzime Starova (Macedonian: Гзиме Старова; 1946, Skopje) is an Albanian author, translator, lawyer and jurist from North Macedonia, university professor and member of the Constitutional Court of North Macedonia from 2008 to 2017. She is married to the writer Luan Starova.

== Biography ==
Gëzime Starova was born on 24 December 1946 to an Albanian family in the city of Skopje, then in the Federal People's Republic of Yugoslavia. She completed his primary and secondary education in his hometown, then in 1970 he graduated from the Faculty of Law of the Ss. Cyril and Methodius University of Skopje. Starova worked at the faculty the following year, 1971, first as an intern in the department of administrative and legal sciences, and from 1973 as an assistant in the subject of labor law and social security. In 1978, he defended his master's thesis at the Faculty of Law with the topic "Special protection of workers at work" (Mbrojtja e veçantë e punëtorëve në punë). In 1979, she became a teacher of labor law and social security. In 1991, she defended her doctorate at the Faculty of Law of the University of Ljubljana on the topic "Regulation of labor issues in the RSFJ and its types" (Rregullimi i marrëdhënieve të punës në RSFJ dhe format e saj).

In 1992, she became an associate professor at the Faculty of Law in Skopje in the subject of Labor law and social security. From 1992 to 1994, Starova was a member of the Management Council of the Pension and Disability Insurance Fund of the Republic of Macedonia. In 1997, she was elected associate professor and in 2002 she was elected full professor. In the years 1998 - 1999, she was the representative of the Republic of Macedonia on the Committee of experts for local social services in the Council of Europe. From 2004 to 2008, she was vice-president of the Senate of the University of Skopje. In 2001, she began teaching as a full professor of labor law and social security at the Faculty of Law of the South East European University in Tetovo, where she taught Albanian and Macedonian literary languages. She is a member of the university board.

In 1997, for the translation of Philippe Seguin's Essay on Crisis, she received the "Vangya Chashule" award for the best translation in the field of essay writing. In 1999, Gëzime Starova was a visiting professor at the University of Cagliari, Italy, and in November 2004 at the Faculty of Law of the university "René Descartes" in Paris. From 7 October 2008 to 7 October 2017 he was a judge at the Constitutional Court of North Macedonia.

== Publications ==
- "Uređivanje radnih odnosa u SFRJ i njihovi oblici", 1991 OCLC 443070917
- "E drejta e punës", 1996, 2004
- “Edukata qytetare për shkollat e mesme profesionale”, 2000, (coauthor)
- "Trudovo pravo", 2009 OCLC 723216679
- “Rregullimi i çështjeve të punës në RSFJ dhe llojet e saj”
- “Krijimi dhe zhvillimi i ligjit të punës dhe të drejtës së punës në Kosovë”
