= The Vienna Initiative =

2009 European financial rescue plan

The Vienna initiative was a plan undertaken in January 2009 by European banks and governments to work towards a joint solution for the 2008 financial crisis specifically in developing regions of Europe. It has been created to avoid a bank crash that was threatening the region because of the subprime crisis as the liquidity in the CESEE countries depended on the Western ones. It is a forum where the representatives of the private and public economical sector from the Western countries but also Central, Eastern and South-Eastern European countries (CESEE) meet. This Initiative impacted much of those countries, notably Romania.

== Context ==
The development of the banking system in Eastern and Southern Europe in the 1990s was strongly influenced by the political and economic changes that took place in the region at that time.

With the fall of communism and the adoption of liberalisation and democratisation policies, many Eastern European countries began to open their economies to foreign investment and to encourage the creation of new businesses. This led to an increase in demand for credit and banking services to support economic growth. The opening up of these economies attracted Western European banks, which saw their market as saturated. These banks saw significant growth potential and attractive financial prospects in these transition regions. This expansion of cross-border banking services has had a significant impact on the transition of these regions, thanks to a transfer of mechanisms and knowledge from Western European banking systems. Being relatively well supervised, cross-border banking has been of great benefit to businesses and consumers, allowing capital to flow into the region, as well as providing abundant financing.

In addition, the development of the banking system in Eastern Europe has also been influenced by the integration of the region into the European Union and other regional organisations, which have promoted economic and financial cooperation between Eastern European countries and the European Union as a whole.

However, capital flows through the cross-border banking system and increased financial leverage have contributed to the creation of vulnerabilities in the financial system. These vulnerabilities have been caused by the growing dependence of the Eastern European economies on foreign financing and the increasing indebtedness of companies and households. This has made these economies more susceptible to financial shocks and capital outflows, which may have had adverse consequences for the region's growth and financial stability. It is against this background that financial stress and fears of massive financial deleveraging in the region following the 2008 financial crisis prompted the authorities to launch the Vienna Initiative.

=== 2008 financial crisis ===
This crisis, which led to the creation of the Vienna Initiative, was unique as it came from the most important banks of the west. A bubble had been created as risky loans had been dispersed across the economy. Once people did not manage to reimburse their loans, the economy collapsed leaving the emerging countries in a very complex situation. They depended on the Western banks that were withdrawing their capitals from the emerging countries. A solution needed to be found in order to avoid a total collapse of the emerging economy. Once the crises stroke, the Commission and the European Investment bank decided to react and convince Western banks not to reduce drastically the money they were injecting in the CESEE economies.

== The Initiative ==
In order to help the CESEE countries during the 2008 crisis, the Vienna Initiative was created to avoid a total collapse of their economies. The European Central Bank, the European Commission, the International Monetary Fund and the World bank have been the leaders of the initiative. The Forum was all set up by January 2009. In 2008, they coordinated the actions between the West and the CESEE under the “CEE concerted Action”. Western banks were to keep investment in the CESEE countries. The Vienna Initiative is a space of coordination and decision making. They wanted to avoid a credit decline as those countries had experienced credit growth during the years preceding the Initiative. The challenge was both external and internal. The CESEE countries had to deal with a diminishing external demand and no internal demand. Their currency had also been depreciated, which for emerging economies is no good as usually debts in emerging countries are emitted in foreign currencies. The maintenance of western banks allowed access to financial resources in those emerging countries.

In total, more than $33 billion were injected in the economy through the Joint IFI Action Plan. That plan was launched by the European Bank for Reconstruction and development, the European Investment Bank and the World Bank.

Working groups that would produce recommendations were also created. The goal was to analyze “the following policy issues that would make financial sectors in emerging Europe more resilient in the longer term”. Those working groups are composed of representatives of the banks, of the European Institutions, central banks, ...

At the height of the crisis, many were afraid of a 'Prisoner's Dilemma' occurring in which larger foreign banks would pull support and investment from developing subsidiaries and thus cause financial ruin. Although it would have been beneficial for one bank to do so if the other's had not, the Vienna Initiative succeeded in instilling cooperation to avoid this. Large European banks remained committed to their support and allowed for gradual deleveraging of the entire system and manage liquidity more efficiently.

=== Legacy ===
The IMF studied the effects of the Vienna Initiative on the CESEE countries through a set of data to analyze the evolution of loans in those regions. They found out that banks had started to withdraw their loans already before the collapse of Lehman Brothers. They also found out that the banks that took part in the Initiative seemed to be overall more stable than the ones that were not involved. According to the IMF, it seems that the Vienna Initiative had a relative success as it helped “reduce the negative externalities stemming from home countries of foreign banks” and it also “softened the inevitable deleveraging”.

=== The Vienna Initiative 2.0 ===
In the wake of the sovereign debt crisis in the euro area and the resurgence of financial risks in the countries of the CESEE region, still weakened by the 2008 financial crisis, the successful Vienna initiative, was relaunched as the "Vienna Initiative 2.0" in January 2012.

A number of measures taken by euro area countries to strengthen banking systems have had a negative impact on bank subsidiaries in the CESEE region due to the pressure on cross-border banks. Examples of these new measures include the transposition of financial standards into European law and the creation of the European Banking Union.

The context of a credit crunch and rapid deleveraging in emerging Europe has necessitated enhanced coordination between host and home country banking supervisors. The principle to govern cooperation between home and host countries of the CESEE regions was defined by the Committee of European Banking Supervisors.

As for the previous time, the Vienna 2.0 initiative is a platform for exchanges between different actors of the financial system of the CESEE region; public and private actors including the European Commission, the main cross-border banks, the authorities of the host and home countries. It again seeks to solve a short-term problem, which is to avoid an excessive and uncoordinated decline in bank lending in the region (IMF, 2012). It also once again has a monitoring role with regard to the deleveraging processes of the countries in this region.

However, the Vienna 2.0 initiative goes further, as it also has a long-term vision and is part of a more formal framework. It aims to develop the cross-border banking system and reduce the dependence of the host region's financial system on local sources of finance (IMF, 2012). In addition, the Vienna 2.0 initiative focuses more on improving coordination, cooperation and information exchange between supervisors but also between host and home countries in order to achieve stability in cross-border banking.

More concretely, the objectives of the Vienna initiative 2.0, in addition to its public-private platform that can be used quickly in the event of a financial crisis, are:

- To help to avoid systemic stress and strengthen financial stabilization by monitoring disorderly deleveraging in the countries of the CESEE region and the withdrawal of cross-border funds from parent banks. To this end, it now produces the “Central, Eastern and South-Eastern Europe (CESEE) Bank Lending Report” several times a year
- Ensure that policies are conducted in the collective interest.
- Facilitate coordination of host country authorities and reduce regulatory volatility and risk
- Enable rapid coordination between relevant actors in the event of a crisis

== The Vienna Initiative today ==
The Vienna Initiative is still active today as a platform for coordination and exchange between public and private actors to measure financial stress. The Vienna Initiative is now focusing on other objectives, still in the process of assessing and monitoring financial stabilization in the CESEE region. It produces analytical and evaluation reports several times a year.

=== Assessing international financial instruments ===
The role of the Vienna Initiative and the Working Group is to assess the effectiveness of financial instruments and products best suited to the investment market gaps of the countries in the CESEE region. Although, according to the EIB, investment in this region is above the EU average, it remains below the level needed to achieve economic convergence. It is therefore important to identify and evaluate a combination of financial instruments, adapted to the needs of the CESEE region. As a continuation of the Vienna 2.0 initiative, the working group still publishes several times a year reports on the assessment of cross-border bank strategies and deleveraging in these regions.

=== Financing innovation ===
The Vienna Initiative is also undertaking a study with the EIB entitled: "The state of innovation financing in the CESEE countries". Through these studies, carried out by more than 40 experts from major international financial institutions and representatives of public and private institutions in the region, the VI seeks to identify ways to improve the financing conditions for innovative companies and to support them more effectively. According to the EIB, companies in the CESEE region receive less funding for innovation compared to the rest of Europe. These companies are often smaller, less dynamic, less innovative and have less growth potential.

Finally, the initiative is now also monitoring the credit market in the region, and more specifically the monitoring of non-performing loans. As in the years 2011, the implementation of EU banking regulation and supervision on cross-border banking activities in the CESEE region has caused financial stress which is partly responsible for the revival of the initiative, today it measures the consequences of these measures.

To conclude on this Initiative, the European Investment Bank considers the Vienna Initiative a relative success in avoiding financial stress and maintaining the exposure of banks in the CESEE region. However, at the end of the commitments in 2011, there is still a fallback of parent banks in their domestic markets. Indeed, following the eurozone debt crisis, these parent banks have reduced their exposure to their subsidiaries, leading to an orderly deleveraging. However, this should be put into perspective as this situation was not specific to the region CESEE but rather part of a global trend.

In this situation, the Vienna Initiative was able to buy time and ensure an orderly deleveraging. What is important to note about the success of the Vienna Initiative and what allows it to endure is the success of the coordination and cooperation mechanisms between the different actors, facilitated by the presence of international bodies and institutions.

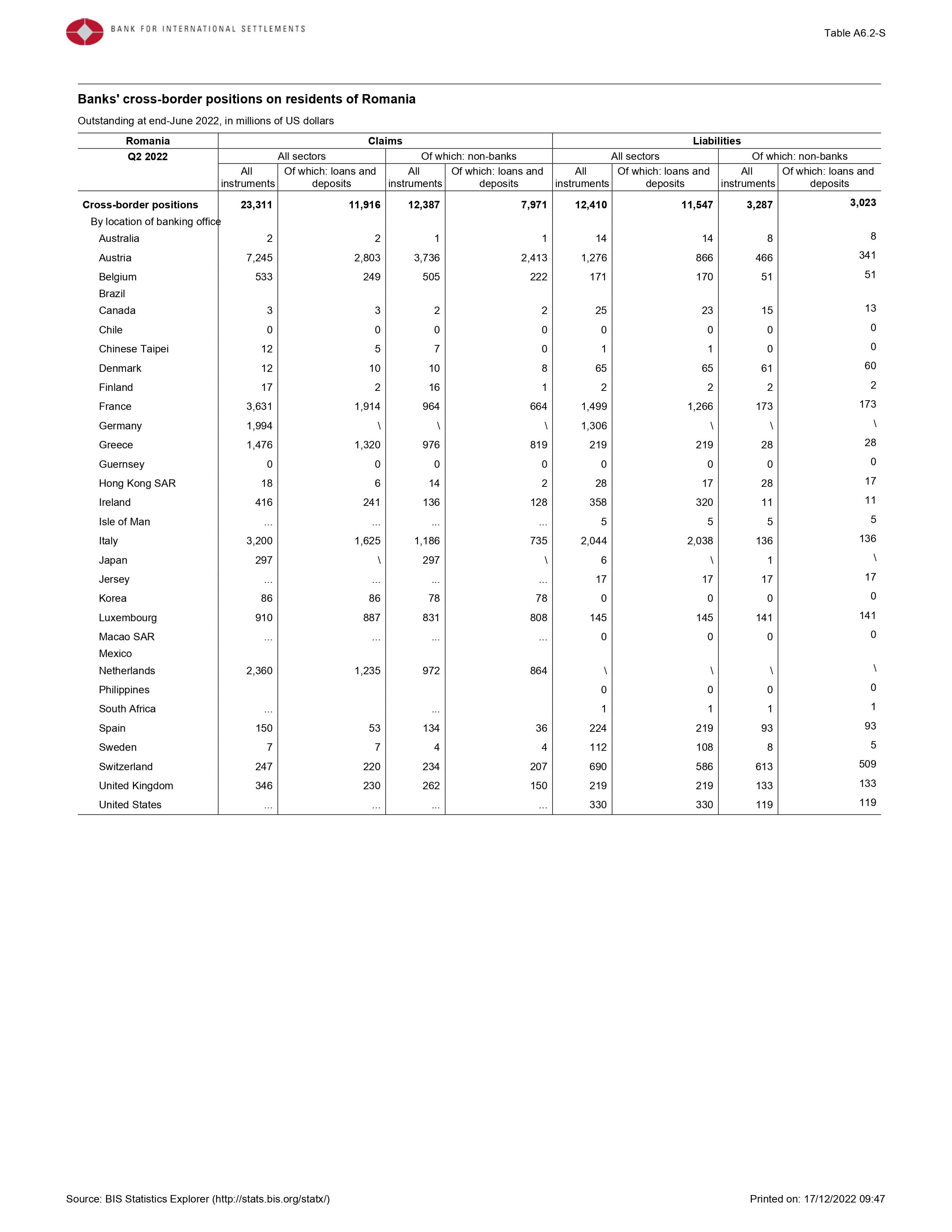
Banks' cross-border positions on residents of Romania in Q2 2022

=== The impact of the Vienna Initiative on the Romania's economic policy ===
In Romania, the Vienna Initiative through the European Bank Coordination Initiative secured private sector involvement with the International Monetary Fund and the EU program to keep commercial banks bailed in rather than bailed out. The goal was to encourage parent banks operating in Romania to maintain their exposure and to recapitalize their subsidiaries for the duration of the IMF-EU programs in order to stabilize the balance of payment in the country.

The commitment of parent banks in Romania was to “increase the minimum capital adequacy ratio for each subsidiary from 8 to 10 percent” and to fully maintain their March 2009 exposure for the time of the IMF program.

Following this attempt to save the country's financial system, Romania responded to this by adopting macro-prudential policy through its Central Bank.

==== Macroprudential policy of the Romanian Central Bank ====
The concept of macro-prudential policy is a widely discussed topic. It stresses that financial stability is one of the key points to ensure a proper economic development. The robustness of a financial system, its resilience to endogenous shocks and the limitation of systemic risks and costs are different elements we can find when discussing macroprudential policy. The concept itself since the beginning has shown concerns for the financial system stability and its link with the macroeconomy.

The macroprudential approach is a response to the limits of the microprudential policies. The goal pursued by micro-prudential policies was to safeguard individual financial institutions from related risks and prevent them from taking too many risks. The recent crisis has shown the stability of individual financial institutions alone is not enough to preserve the stability of the whole financial system.

==== The role of the National Bank of Romania ====
The National Bank of Romania (NBR) is one of the two authorities along with the Authority of Financial Supervision (AFS) responsible for the financial stability of the country. The National Bank of Romania manages the regulation and prudential supervision of the credit institution while the Authority of Financial Supervision focuses on the insurance, capital and private pensions markets.

To deal with the 2008 financial crisis and meet with the EU requirements, the Committee for Financial Stability was established in 2007 to manage the expected systemic risks and prevent wrong behaviors. This committee was constituted by the Governor of the National Bank of Romania, the President of the Authority of Financial Supervision, the Minister of Finance and the manager of the deposit guarantee.

The National Bank of Romania with its double position as monetary and supervisory authority was entitled to maintain the financial stability of the country. To fulfill this role, it initiated periodical assessments in order to identify possible sources of systemic risks and the way they could contaminate the financial system.

The main instruments used to identify potential risks were: stress testing, early warming, quantitative and qualitative analysis and econometric tests. Concerning stress testing, the last assessment that took place from the third trimester of 2013 to the second trimester of 2015 showed that the country's financial system proved to be fairly good resistant to macroeconomic shocks while its solvency and its capital adequacy were above the NBR prudential requirements.

==== The macroprudential monetary tool ====
Following the 2008 economic crisis, the banking system of Romania experienced different issues: deficit of liquidity, slowing down of lending activity, deterioration of bank asset portfolio and growth of indebtedness. To deal with these issues, two main macroprudential monetary tools have been used: Loan to Value (LTV) to assess the risk of a loan and Debt to Income (DTI) to assess the creditworthiness of the borrowers. The results were quite good and following the macroprudential standards and the prudential rules implemented by all the EU countries by the 1 January 2014, the country increased its capacity to absorb losses and limit the contagion effect of banks default on the real economy.

==== The Troika Group ====
The 2008 crisis pushed the European Union to react in order to save the economies of the Member States. It led to the creation of the Vienna Initiative but other than that, other groups have been created and among them, the Troika group.

In fact, the Countries facing the crisis were lacking financial tools that any government would use to manage a crisis. It was impossible for them to either increase the stock of money, to adapt their exchange rate or to move interest rate. Those tools are under the authority of the European Central Bank. Different countries of the Eurozone, thus, asked for help to the EU. This Troika group has been created in 2010 by the heads of state and governments. The European Commission, the European Central bank and the International Monetary fund are involved in the group. Troika offered financial support through different programs. For the countries to access those programs, they had to comply to providing information about their finances. The information provided by the governments were used by the Troika group to respond most adequately.

In 2014, a study conducted by the European Parliament on the Troika group led to issuing two resolutions. One about the role and the activities of the Troika in the countries under the European program and the other one is about the aspects related to the employment and the social dimension of the activities of the Troika group. This study has highlighted the lack and transparency of the group but it has also shown the not-so-good results it has achieved for the much exceeding social and economic costs.
