= Ministry of Finance (North Macedonia) =

Government ministry of North Macedonia

- Министерство за финансии (Macedonian); Ministria e Financave (Albanian)
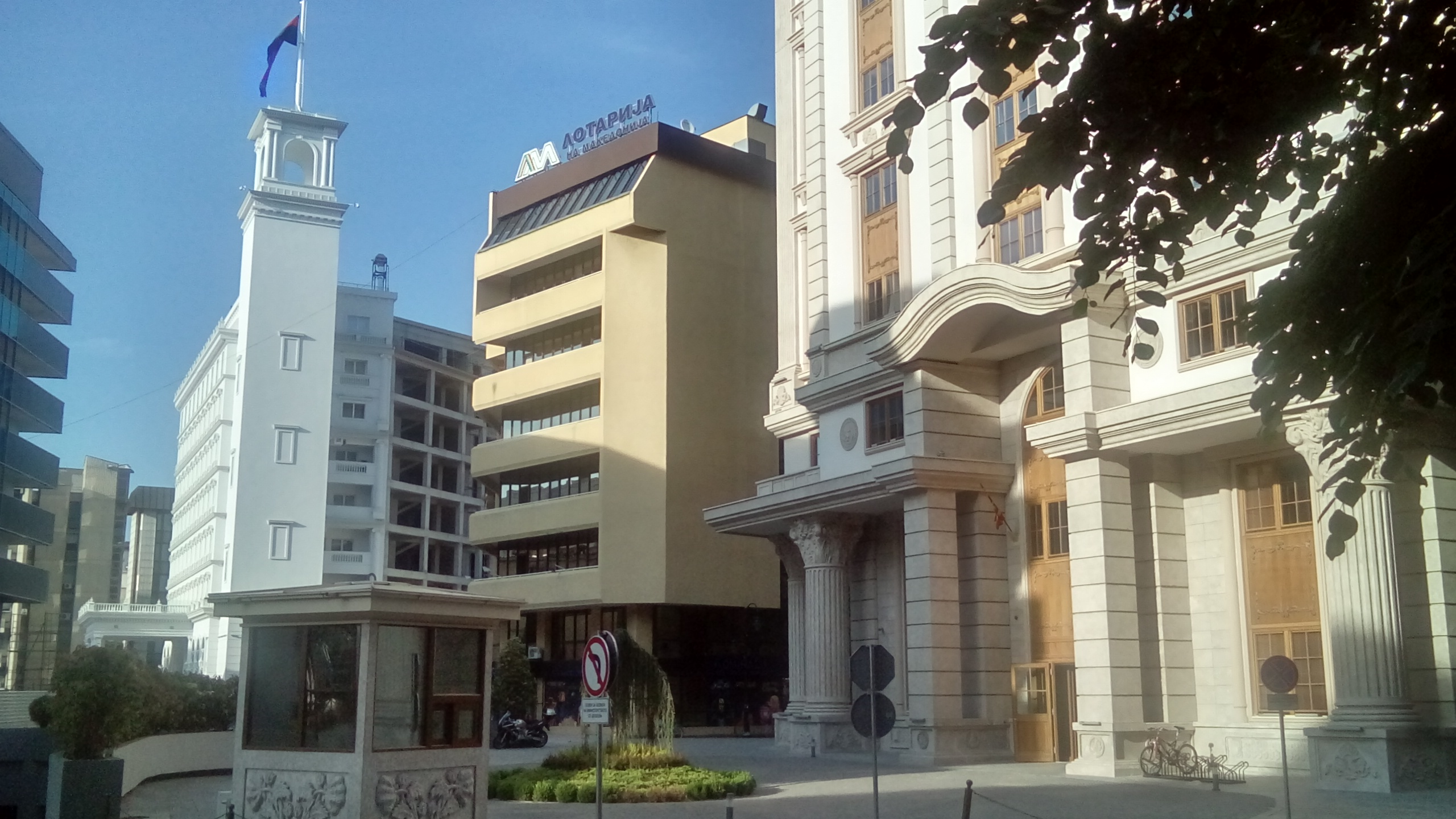

Agency overview
- Formed: 1991
- Jurisdiction: Government of North Macedonia
- Headquarters: Dame Gruev 12, Skopje, North Macedonia
- Ministers responsible: Gordana Dimitrieska-Kočoska, Minister of Finance; Filip Nikolovski, Deputy Minister of Finance; Jelena Tast, State secretary of Finance
- Website: www.finance.gov.mk

Minister of Finance (Macedonian: Министeр за финансии Minister za finansii, Albanian: Ministria e Financave) is the person in charge of the Ministry of Finance of North Macedonia. Gordana Dimitrieska-Kočoska is the current Minister of Finance.

== List of ministers ==
Minister	Image	Party	Term start	Term end
Metodija Tosevski		Independent	20 Mar 1991	4 Sep 1992
Dzevdet Hajredini		PDP	4 Sep 1992	20 Dec 1994
Jane Miljovski		SDSM	20 Dec 1994	23 Feb 1996
Taki Fiti		SDSM	23 Feb 1996	30 Nov 1998
Boris Stojmenov		VMRO-DPMNE	30 Nov 1998	27 Dec 1999
Nikola Gruevski		VMRO-DPMNE	27 Dec 1999	1 Nov 2002
Petar Gosev		LDP	1 Nov 2002	15 Jul 2004
Nikola Popovski		SDSM	15 Jul 2004	28 Aug 2006
Trajko Slaveski		VMRO-DPMNE	28 Aug 2006	10 Jul 2009
Zoran Stavreski		VMRO-DPMNE	10 Jul 2009	15 June 2016
Kiril Minovski		VMRO-DPMNE	15 June 2016	1 Jun 2017
Dragan Tevdovski		SDSM	1 Jun 2017	31 Aug 2019
Nina Angelovska		Independent	1 Sep 2019	30 Aug 2020
Fatmir Besimi		DUI	30 Aug 2020	June 2024
Gordana Dimitrieska-Kočoska		VMRO-DPMNE	June 2024	Incumbent

== See also ==
- Government of North Macedonia
