= Anastasia Dimitrova =

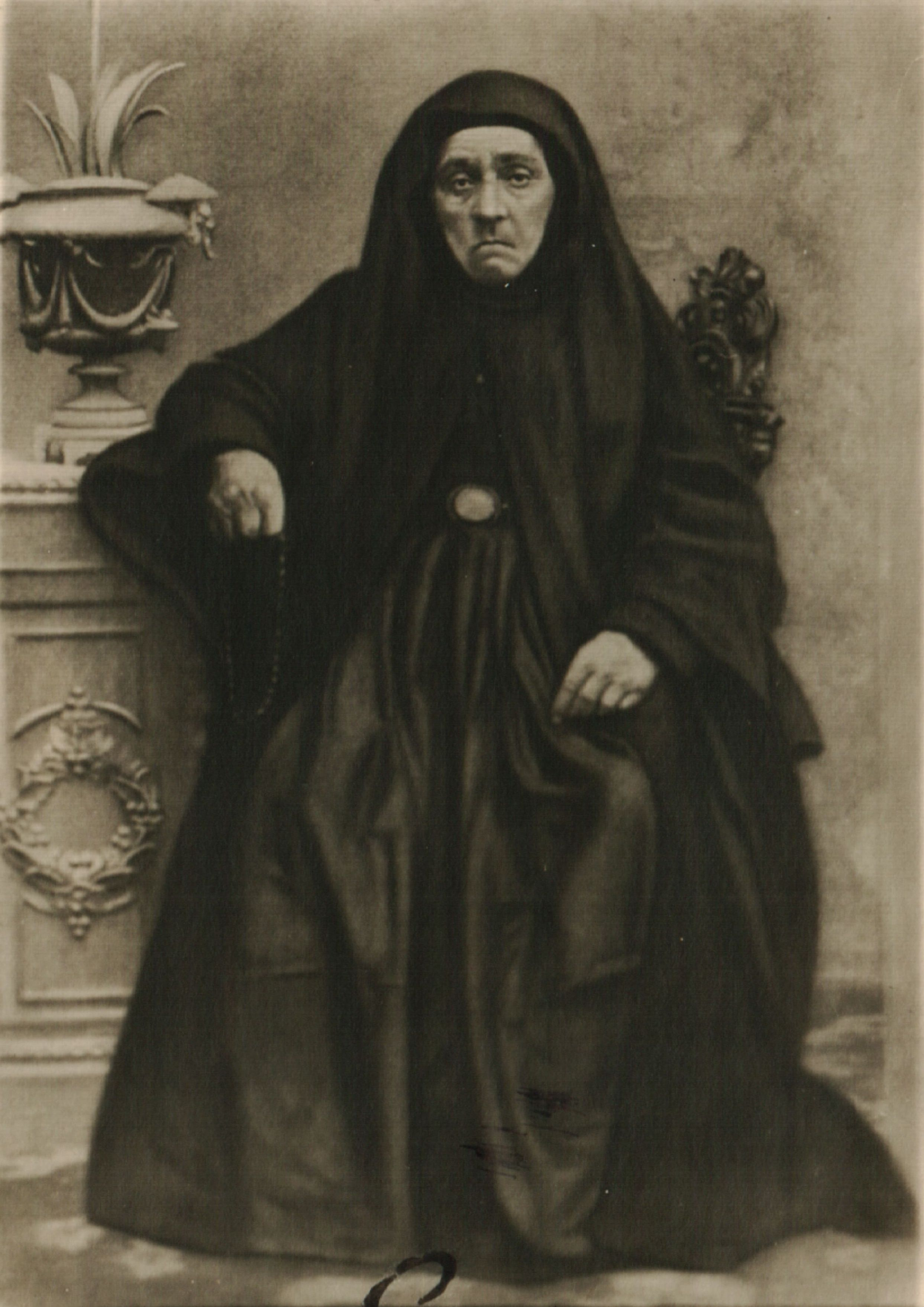
Anastasia Dimitrova

Anastasia Dimitrova (Bulgarian: Анастасия Димитрова) (12 May 1815 – 1894) was the first Bulgarian female teacher of the National Revival period. In 1840, she established in her native city of Pleven the first girls' school in the Bulgarian lands.

== Early life and education ==
Dimitrova was born in Pleven on 12 May 1815 to poor Bulgarian parents: her mother was a servant in Agapius, the bishop of Vratsa's home. She began her education with the bishop's mother. In 1836–1839, she continued to study in the Kalofer nunnery, not only with the nuns, but also with well-known teachers such as Rayno Popovich and Botyo Petkov. She studied history, geography, arithmetic and grammar.

== Career ==
In October 1840, she founded a secular girls' school based on the Bell-Lancaster method in her native Pleven. The school was sponsored by Bishop Agapius and employed Church Slavonic books; besides Bulgarian, the girls were also taught Greek. Although her educational activities suffered a short interruption, she continued her work in 1842. By 1845, the Pleven school was visited by 90 girls from Pleven, Lovech, Troyan, Tarnovo, Vratsa and other cities. Some of Dimitrova's former pupils founded schools in their respective hometowns. Upon marrying in 1852, Dimitrova left the school but continued to work as a private tutor to around 10 girls, along with her former student Mita Gegova.

== Later life ==
A devout Christian, Dimitrova visited Jerusalem in 1894, became a nun under the religious name Anna and died shortly thereafter in the Holy Land.
