= Luan Starova =

Albanian writer (1941–2022)

Luan Arif Starova (Macedonian: Луан Ариф Старова; 14 August 1941 – 24 February 2022) was an Albanian writer who lived in North Macedonia. He published his works both in Albanian and in Macedonian. He is translated in over 20 languages around the world.

== Biography ==
Luan Starova was born in Pogradec, an Albanian town on Lake Ohrid, in 1941. His family had legal and scholarly background: his grandfather on the father's side had served as an Ottoman qadi in Prilep, before retiring and emigrating to Turkey; his father earned a law degree in Istanbul, and was a lawyer and a scholar.

In 1943, when Luan was a small child, his family moved to Struga, then annexed by Albania, at the opposite end of Lake Ohrid from Pogradec. (Struga is now part of the Republic of North Macedonia.) After WWII, the family moved to Skopje, the capital of the new SR Macedonia.

He grew up in Tito's Yugoslavia, and studied French language and literature at Skopje University (1960–1967). After graduation, he worked as a journalist, becoming in 1968 the editor of the Albanian-language program of Television Skopje.

However, that same year he left for Zagreb to start his postgraduate studies at Zagreb University. He earned a master's degree with a thesis on The Balkans in the Prose of Guillaume Apollinaire. When working for his doctoral degree in French and comparative literature (awarded 1978), he spent some time at Sorbonne, collecting materials on the collaboration of Apollinaire and the Albanian scholar and writer Faik Konitza. Later, he was to edit a book about these two writers.

Starova worked as a professor of French literature at Skopje University, eventually serving as the chair of the Department of Romance Languages and Literature.

Since 1985, Starova also worked on a number of diplomatic posts in various European and Arab countries. After the North Macedonia became an independent state, Starova was appointed as his country's first ambassador to France (1994); later he also served as the ambassador to Spain (1996) and Portugal.

Starova started writing novels in 1971. Several of Starova's novels published since 1992 form the so-called "Balkan Saga", in which he explored the lives of people on both sides of the Albania-Macedonia border under three "Empires"—the Ottoman, the Fascist, and the Stalinist—through the story of his family.

Luan Starova was a translator of French literary works (e.g., poetry by André Frénaud (fr)) into both Albanian and Macedonian.

Since 1972, Starova participated in the organization of the annual Struga Poetry Evenings.

In 2017, he was awarded the French legion of honor, rank officer.

== Personal life and death ==
Luan Starova's father, Arif Starova, who in his youth earned a law degree in Istanbul, worked as a lawyer in both Albania and Yugoslavia. An ardent bibliophile and amateur historian, he joined the staff of the National History Institute in Skopje, where he was able to use his knowledge of Ottoman Turkish to translate Ottoman-era documents.

After his retirement, he continued as an independent researcher. He put much effort into deciphering, studying, and translating records of the Bitola qadi's court from the 15th through 19th centuries.

The theme of "my Father's books" often appears in Starova's work. Starova's older brother, Vulnet Starova (mk), was a doctor and politician. He served as the Speaker of the People's Assembly of Macedonia in 1986–1991. Luan's wife is Gëzime Starova.

Starova died on 24 February 2022, at the age of 80.

== Works ==
- Луѓе и мостови (1971) (People and Bridges)
- Kutijtë e pranvëres (1971) (The Boundaries of Spring)
- Barikadat e kohës (1976) (The Barricades of Time)
- Доближувања (1977) (Approaches)
- Релации (1982) (Relations)
- Кинеска пролет (1984) (Chinese Spring)
- Пријатели (1986) (Friends)
- Континуитети (1988) (Continuities)
- Митска птица (1991) (Mythic Bird)
- Песни од Картагина (1991) (Songs from Carthage)
- Мостот на љубовта (1992) (The Bridge of Love)
- Татковите книги (1993) (My Father's Books)
- Времето на козите (1993) (The Time of the Goats; a small extract is translated as The Goat Age)
- Балкански клуч (1995) (The Balkan Key)
- Француски книжевни студии - 20 век (1995) (French literary studies: the 20th century)
- Атеистички музеј (1997) (The Museum of Atheism)
- Пресадена земја (1998) (The transplanted land)
- Патот на јагулите (2000) (The Path of the Eels)

== English translations ==
Two of Luan Starova's novels from the Balkan Saga cycle (My Father's Books and The Time of the Goats) have been published in English translation, translated by Christina E. Kramer. In 2014, she was awarded a National Endowment for the Arts grant to fund her work on translating another novel from this cycle, The Path of the Eels (possibly under an English title Pyramid of Water). This was the first time ever a NEA grant was awarded to support a translation from Macedonian to English.

== French translations ==
Le Rivage de l'exil, Éditions de l'Aube, Collection Regards croisés, 2003, 284 pages (ISBN 978-2-87678-860-2) (traduction du macédonien par Clément d'Içartéguy, nom de plume de Patrick Chrismant, premier ambassadeur de France à Skopje) - préface d’Edgar Morin Le Temps des chèvres, Fayard, 1997 (ISBN 978-2-213-59801-7) (traduction du macédonien par Clément d'Içartéguy) Faïk Konitza et Guillaume Apollinaire : une amitié européenne, L'Esprit des péninsules, 1998 (ISBN 978-2-910435-37-0) Les Livres de mon père, Fayard, 1998 (ISBN 978-2-213-60171-7) (traduction du macédonien et de l'albanais par Clément d'Içartéguy) Le Chemin des anguilles, Éditions des Syrtes, 2009 (ISBN 978-2-84545-146-9) (traduction du macédonien par Clément d'Içartéguy) Le Musée de l'athéisme, Fayard, 1999 (ISBN 978-2-213-60431-2) (traduction du macédonien par Harita Wybrands)
