= Ss. Cyril and Methodius University of Skopje =

University in Skopje, North Macedonia

Ss. Cyril and Methodius University in Skopje
- Универзитет „Св. Кирил и Методиј“ во Скопје
- Type: Public
- Established: 24 April 1949; 77 years ago
- Affiliations: ERA UNICA CEEPUS CEI EUA IAU EAIE AUF BUN ERASMUS
- Rector: Biljana Angelova
- Faculty: 2,390
- Students: 25,220 (2018–19)
- Location: Skopje, North Macedonia; 42°0′1.27″N 21°26′36.17″E
- Campus: app. 90,000 m² (main campus)
- Website: www.ukim.edu.mk

University rankings

Regional – Overall
- QS Emerging Europe and Central Asia: 159 (2022)

The Ss. Cyril and Methodius University in Skopje (UKIM) (Macedonian: Универзитет „Св. Кирил и Методиј“ во Скопје (УКИМ), romanized: Univerzitet "Sv. Kiril i Metodij" vo Skopje (UKIM)) is a public research university in Skopje, North Macedonia. It is the oldest and largest public university in the country. It is named after the Byzantine Christian theologians and missionaries Cyril and Methodius. As of 2018–19 school year, a total of 25,220 students are enrolled at the university. Furthermore, the teaching and research staff number 2,390 people; this is further supported by over 300 members in the university's institutions.

The primary language of instruction is Macedonian, but there are a number of courses which are carried out in English, German, French, Italian and Albanian.

== History ==
The beginnings of modern, organized tertiary education in Skopje are connected to the establishment of the Faculty of Philosophy on December 16, 1920. This faculty was organized as an autonomous entity of the University of Belgrade. During the Balkan Wars of 1912–1913, Skopje was conquered by the Kingdom of Serbia, and after the end of the First World War in 1918 the city became part of the newly estbalsihed Kingdom of Serbs, Croats and Slovenes. The establishment of a University-level institution in the city was part of the wider assimilationist and colonialist policy of the Kingdom, which considered its part of Macedonia as historically and ethnically Serbian, and in line with such policies the first Faculty of Philosophy consisted only of humanities departments.

With the spread of the World War Two into the Kingdom of Yugoslavia in 1941, the activities of the Faculty ceased. Following the occupation of the region by the Kingdom of Bulgaria, a new institution of higher education was established in 1943 in Skopje – the Tsar Boris III University. In September 1944 a coup d'état in Sofia led to Bulgaria joining the Soviets. As a result the Bulgarian administration in Macedonia withdrew to the old borders of the country. So, the Bulgarian University stopped its educational activity. In 1944 the Socialist Republic of Macedonia was established by ASNOM, which became officially operational in December, shortly after the German retreat from Skopje.

On the 16th of April 1945 a new Faculty of Philosophy was established in Skopje by the Macedonian communist authorities. On the 16th of December 1946 the official opening ceremony for the Faculty of Philosophy took place, which would serve as the cornerstone of the University of Skopje. This marked the beginning of a first Macedonian state university. The first Faculty consisted of the Department of History and Philology and the Department of Mathematics and Natural Science, while the Medical Faculty and the Faculty of Agriculture and Forestry were added in 1947. Fifty-eight students enrolled during the first academic year of 1946–1947; in the next year this number grew to 907. The development of higher education in Macedonia was characterized by rapid growth, and several other faculties were added in the following years. Parallel to the education activities in the existing faculties, scholarly research was undertaken with the development of independent institutes of research. The University of Ss. Cyril and Methodius was officially established in 1949. The Institute of National History was founded in 1948, followed by Institute of Folklore in 1949, and the Institute of Economics in 1952. Today, there are 10 research institutes affiliated with the University of Skopje.

After the great 1963 Skopje earthquake, which destroyed most of the city of Skopje, the university was leveled and some of the most modern laboratories in Yugoslavia were destroyed. By this time the University of Skopje was the third largest in Yugoslavia. It was quickly rebuilt on the premises of a much larger and modern urban campus. At the request of Yugoslav authorities, scientists from UNESCO's Department of Natural Sciences were sent to meet with the university's scientists to develop plans for the rehabilitation of the university's science laboratories. As a result, a large donation of equipment for science teaching and research was gathered from around the world through UNESCO's international programme of aid to Skopje.

At present, the University of Skopje is carried out in the spirit of the 1991 Constitution of the Republic of North Macedonia, which incorporated the social, economic and political changes that had taken place after North Macedonia proclaimed its independence from the Former Yugoslav Federate State. On 3 August 2000 the Parliament of the Republic of North Macedonia brought the new Law on Higher Education which adopted the overall European standards of higher education. The management organs of the university are the University Senate, consisting of two staff members from each faculty and scientific research institutes, five appointed members by the government of the Republic of North Macedonia and five students delegated from the Student Organization; the University Board, consisting of the rector, the vice-rectors, the secretary general, the deans of the faculties, the directors of the scientific-research institutes and one student representative; and the rector. The university represents a functional community of 25 faculties and 10 research institutes.

== Departments and faculties ==
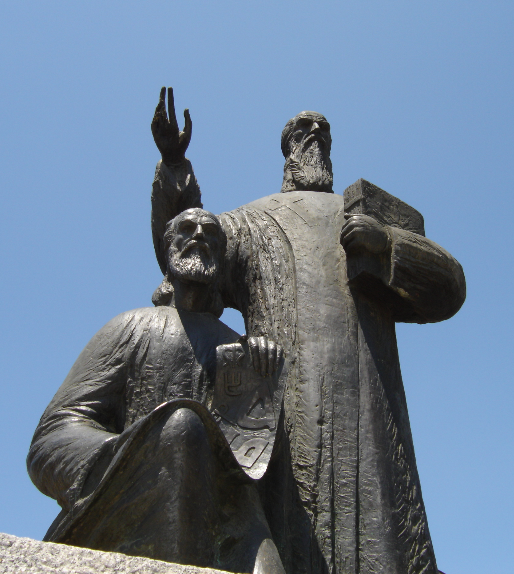
Statue of Ss. Cyril and Methodius in the center of the campus

The central building of the university

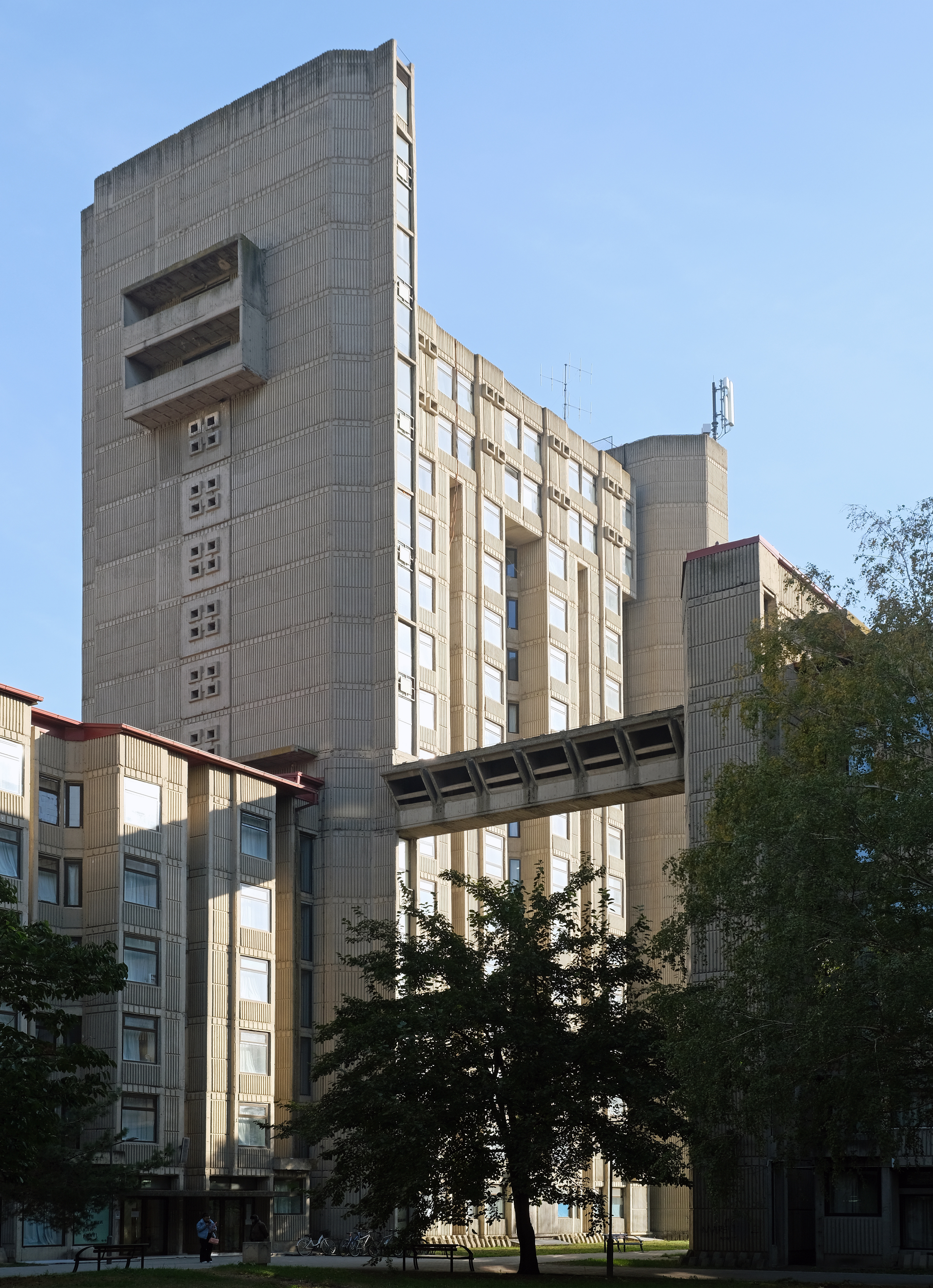
The student dormitory complex Goce Delčev

The university is divided into 23 faculties and 10 research institutes:

=== Faculties ===
- Faculty of Philosophy
  - Founded in 1946
  - 12 undergraduate study programmes
  - 17 postgraduate study programmes
- "Blaže Koneski" Faculty of Philology
  - Founded in 1946
  - 11 undergraduate study programmes
  - 13 postgraduate study programmes
- Faculty of Natural Sciences and Mathematics
  - Founded in 1946
  - 24 undergraduate study programmes
  - 31 postgraduate study programmes
- Faculty of Agricultural Sciences and Food
  - Founded in 1947
  - 10 undergraduate study programmes
  - 24 postgraduate study programmes
- Faculty of Forestry
  - Founded in 1947
  - 4 undergraduate study programmes
  - 17 postgraduate study programmes
- Medical Faculty
  - Founded in 1947
  - 3 undergraduate study programmes
  - 24 postgraduate study programmes
- "St. Clement of Ohrid" Faculty of Pedagogy
  - Founded in 1947
  - 6 undergraduate study programmes
- Faculty of Architecture
  - Founded in 1949
  - 1 undergraduate study programme
  - 4 postgraduate study programmes
- Faculty of Civil Engineering
  - Founded in 1949
  - 5 undergraduate study programmes
  - 4 postgraduate study programmes
- Faculty of Economics
  - Founded in 1950
  - 7 undergraduate study programmes
  - 10 postgraduate study programmes
- "Iustinianus Primus" Faculty of Law
  - Founded in 1951
  - 3 undergraduate study programmes
  - 6 postgraduate study programmes
- Faculty of Mechanical Engineering
  - Founded in 1959
  - 9 undergraduate study programmes
  - 6 postgraduate study programmes
- Faculty of Electrical Engineering and Information Technology
  - Founded in 1959
  - 8 undergraduate study programmes
  - 9 postgraduate study programmes
- Faculty of Technology and Metallurgy
  - Founded in 1959
  - 9 undergraduate study programmes
  - 16 postgraduate study programmes
- Faculty of Stomatology
  - Founded in 1959
  - 3 undergraduate study programmes
  - 7 postgraduate study programmes
- Faculty of Music
  - Founded in 1966
  - 27 undergraduate study programmes
  - 36 postgraduate study programmes
- Faculty of Dramatic Arts
  - Founded in 1969
  - 7 undergraduate study programmes
  - 13 postgraduate study programmes
- Faculty of Physical Education
  - Founded in 1977
  - 2 undergraduate study programmes
  - 2 postgraduate study programmes
- Faculty of Pharmacy
  - Founded in 1977
  - 2 undergraduate study programme
  - 9 postgraduate study programmes
- Faculty of Fine Arts
  - Founded in 1980
  - 4 undergraduate study programmes
  - 3 postgraduate study programmes
- Faculty of Veterinary Medicine
  - Founded in 1991
  - 1 undergraduate study programme
  - 5 postgraduate study programmes
- Faculty of Design and Technologies of Furniture and Interior
  - Founded in 2010
  - 2 undergraduate study programmes
  - 8 postgraduate study programmes
- Faculty of Computer Science and Computer Engineering
  - Founded in 2010 by uniting of institutes (institutes founded 1982)
  - 8 undergraduate study programmes
  - 16 postgraduate study programmes

=== Research Institutes ===
- Institute of Agriculture
  - Founded in 1923
- Institute of National History
  - Founded in 1948
- Marko Cepenkov Institute of Folklore
  - Founded in 1950
- Institute of Cattle Breeding
  - Founded in 1952
- Institute of Economics
  - Founded in 1952
- Krste Misirkov Institute of the Macedonian Language
  - Founded in 1953
- Institute of Sociological, Political, and Juridical Research
  - Founded in 1965
- Institute of Earthquake and Seismology Engineering
  - Founded in 1965
- St. Clement of Ohrid Faculty of Theology
  - Founded in 1977
- Institute of Macedonian Literature
  - Founded in 1998
- Institute of Immunobiology and Human Genetics

== Alumni ==
- Nina Angelovska – Finance minister
- Džordže Arsov – Mayor of Kisela Voda
- Ljube Boškoski – former Minister of Internal Affairs of Macedonia
- Vlado Bučkovski – former Prime Minister of Macedonia
- Branko Crvenkovski – former President of Macedonia
- Živko Čingo – Writer
- Georgi Efremov – Macedonian academician and scientist at Macedonian Academy of Sciences and Arts in the field of genetic engineering and biotechnology
- Fatmir Besimi – Minister of Economy
- Nikola Dimitrov – former Deputy Minister of Foreign Affairs and Ambassador to the United States
- Elizabeta Dimitrova – art historian
- Igor Durlovski – opera singer
- Lazar Elenovski – former Minister of Defense
- Elena Filipovska – philologist, teacher, writer
- Taki Fiti – former Minister of Finance
- Ljubomir Frčkoski – author of the Constitution of North Macedonia
- Ljubčo Georgievski – former Prime Minister of Macedonia
- Sofija Grandakovska – author in the field of comparative literature studies and interdisciplinary studies in Holocaust, Jewish history, literature and culture
- Maja Hill – artist
- Gjorge Ivanov – President of (North) Macedonia and Supreme Commander-in-Chief of Macedonian Army
- Zoran Jolevski – Ambassador to the United States and Negotiator for the Macedonia naming dispute
- Sashko Kedev – former presidential candidate
- Gabriela Konevska-Trajkovska – Deputy Prime Minister in charge of European Integration
- Trifun Kostovski – businessman and former Mayor of Skopje
- Tamara Kotevska – film director, best known for the documentary Honeyland which won three awards at the 2019 Sundance Film Festival and received two nominations at the 92nd Academy Awards
- Jagnula Kunovska – Member of Parliament
- Denko Maleski – intellectual, diplomat, and professor
- Sehadete Mekuli – gynecologist
- Antonio Milošoski – Minister of Foreign Affairs
- Zan Mitrev – General Manager of the Zan Mitrev Clinic
- Stevo Pendarovski – former President of North Macedonia
- Tito Petkovski – Member of Parliament
- Filip Petrovski – former Member of Parliament and Director of the City Library
- Petar Popovski – Full professor at Aalborg University and IEEE fellow
- Nikola Ristanovski – actor
- Luan Starova – writer and scholar
- Zoran Stavrevski – Deputy Prime Minister and Minister of Finances of Macedonia
- Miroslav Stojanovski – former Chief of General Staff of Macedonia
- Boris Trajkovski – former President of Macedonia
- Simon Trpčeski – classical pianist
- Vasil Tupurkovski – politician
- Xheladin Murati – university professor
- Gëzime Starova – university professor

== See also ==
- Balkan Universities Network
- Lists of universities and colleges
- Macedonian Journal of Medical Sciences
- Macedonian Journal of Chemistry and Chemical Engineering
