= Kisela Voda =

Kisela Voda Кисела Вода
- Suburb
- Location within North Macedonia
- Coordinates: 41°58′45″N 21°26′8″E
- Country: North Macedonia
- Region: Skopje
- Municipality: Kisela Voda

Population (2002)
  - Total: 84,625
- Time zone: UTC+1 (CET)
  - Summer (DST): UTC+2 (CEST)
- Car plates: SK
- Website: .

Kisela Voda (Macedonian: Кисела Вода) is a suburb of the City of Skopje in the municipality of Kisela Voda, North Macedonia.

== Demographics ==
According to the 2002 census, the suburb had a total of 84,625 inhabitants. Ethnic groups in the suburb include:

- Macedonians 74,431
- Serbs 3,738
- Aromanians 987
- Bosniaks 535
- Turks 419
- Albanians 342
- Romani 324
- Others 1849
