= Faculty of Agricultural Science and Food in Skopje =

Faculty of Ss. Cyril and Methodius University

Ss. Cyril and Methodius University of Skopje
- Универзитет „Св. Кирил и Методиј“ Скопје
- Type: Public
- Established: 1946
- Affiliations: ERA UNICA CEEPUS CEI EUA IAU EAIE AUF BUN ERASMUS
- Chancellor: Prof. Dr. Velimir Stojkoski Vet.M.D.
- Vice-Chancellor: Elena Dumova-Jovanoska Mome Spasovski Kole Vasilevski Pece Nedanovski
- Faculty: 2390
- Students: approx. 50,000
- Location: Skopje, North Macedonia
- Campus: approx. 90,000 m^{2} (970,000 sq ft) (main campus)
- Website: ukim.edu.mk

The Faculty of Agricultural Science and Food in Skopje (Macedonian: Факултет за земјоделски хауки и храна – Скопје, romanized: Fakultet za Zemjodelski Nauki i Hrana) is a part of Ss. Cyril and Methodius University of Skopje. The faculty is located in the eastern part of the city Skopje on campus with other departments of biological and biotechnological science:Faculty of Mathematics and Natural Sciences, Faculty of Veterinary Medicine, University Hospital for Veterinary Medicine, Veterinary Institute, Institute of Agriculture and Faculty of Forestry. Campus is 2 km (1.2 mi) away from the Rector of SS. Cyril and Methodius, and within the campus is located dormitory Stiv Naumov. The faculty is equipped with a net usable building area of 7,465 m^{2} (80,350 sq ft), which houses six amphitheaters, 26 lecture, 28 laboratories, 143 offices, library and reading room with an area of 270 m^{2} (2,900 sq ft) and a student café with an area of 180 m^{2} (1,900 sq ft). The Dean from 2009 is Prof.Dr. Dragi Dimitrievski Ph.D.

== History and profile ==
Faculty of Agricultural Science and Food was established in autumn 1947 under the name Faculty of Agriculture, as a separate department of agricultural and forestry faculty, only a year later the foundation of the Faculty of Philosophy. With the establishment of Agricultural and Forestry Faculty, Faculty of Medicine and has founded the Faculty of Philosophy, have provided conditions for the formation of SS. Cyril and Methodius University of Skopje.

Agro-forestry faculty, by the establishment and commencement of work, permanently organized and improved as a complete teaching and research institution. So far the work and development, passing through several organizational and developmental stages. The changes and transformations, development and operation due to the need for harmonization of the educational process, scientific research, application of their own and foreign scientific knowledge in agriculture, which is affiliated with the political and socio-economic relations in the social order.

In 1975, agricultural-forestry faculty are divided into two independent faculties: Agriculture and Forestry, as a separate business organizations. This independence comes as a result achieved a high degree of development in all activities of the previous two sections, agriculture and forestry.

From 1977 to 1989, Faculty of Agriculture operates as a working organization which were integrated into the Faculty of Agriculture, Agricultural Institute, Institute of Animal Science, Institute of Veterinary, Veterinary Hospital, Institute for fruit growing, viticulture and the Institute for the college farm Trubarevo.

As a result of the complicated organizational structure, from the beginning of 1990, Faculty of Agriculture working as an independent organization working with three core activities: education, scientific research and applied. In the period from 1992 to 1994 within the Faculty of Agriculture, as a special direction, operated and veterinary direction, which further established the independent Faculty of Veterinary Medicine.

In the same 2001, the Faculty be included among the first four faculties in Ss. Cyril and Methodius, who introduced European Credit Transfer System-EKTS in the teaching process.

Today the faculty have the following study programs:

- Agro-Economics
- Animal Biotechnology
- Processing of Animal Products
- Processing of Plant Products
- Quality and Food Safety
- Eco-Agriculture
- Fito-medicine-Plant Protection
- Viticulture
- Horticulture
- Production and Processing of Tobacco

== Organization ==
These are the institutes and departments in which the faculty is divided into:

- Institute of Animal Biotechnology
- Department of Genetics and Artificial Selection
- Institute of Agro-Economics
- Department of Microbiology
- Department of Botanic
- Department of Chemistry and Pedology
- Department of Fito-Medicine
- Department of Horticulture
- Department of Basic Agriculture
- Department of Agro-Engineering
- Department of Fruit and Vegetable Processing
- Department of Food Quality and Safety
