= National Bank of North Macedonia =

Central bank of North Macedonia

Coordinates: 41°59′37″N 21°26′33″E

National Bank of North Macedonia Народна банка на Република Северна Македонија Banka Popullore e Republikës së Maqedonisë së Veriut
- Logo

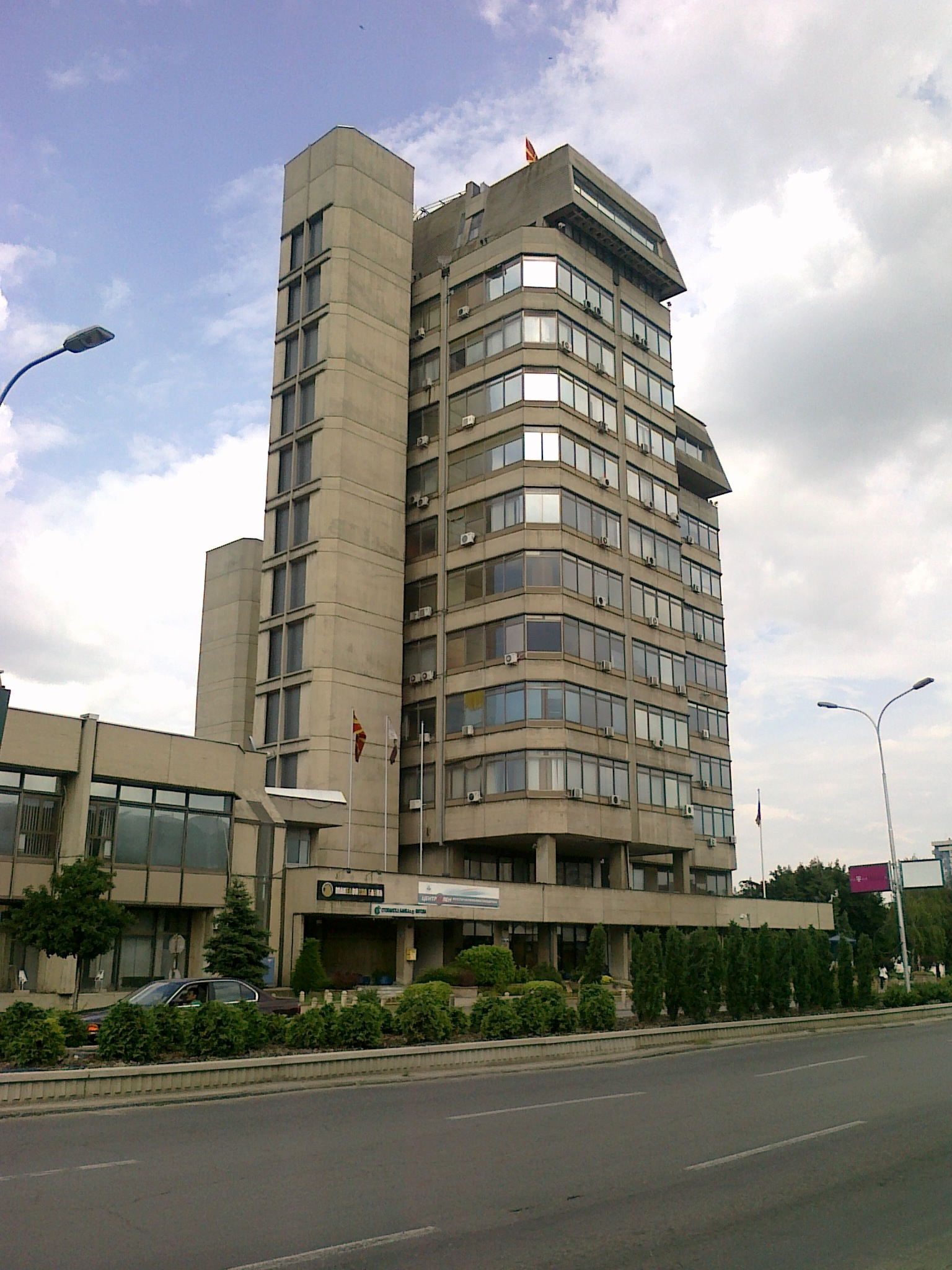
- Headquarters
- Central bank of: North Macedonia
- Headquarters: Skopje
- Established: 1971
- Ownership: 100% state ownership
- Governing body: National Bank Council
- Governor: Trajko Slaveski
- Currency: Macedonian denar MKD (ISO 4217)
- Reserves: 2 230 billion USD
- Website: www.nbrm.mk

The National Bank of the Republic of North Macedonia (Macedonian: Народна банка на Република Северна Македонија, romanized: Narodna banka na Republika Severna Makedonija; Albanian: Banka Popullore e Republikës së Maqedonisë së Veriut) is the central bank of North Macedonia, issuing the Macedonian denar. It is headquartered in the capital city of Skopje.

Until 2019 it was officially named National Bank of the Republic of Macedonia. Since then, it has kept using the acronym NBRM.

== History ==
The National Bank of Macedonia was originally established in 1971, as part of the System of National Banks which replaced the National Bank of Yugoslavia (NBJ) as Yugoslavia's collective monetary authority. The National Bank's brutalist head office building was erected in 1971–1975, on a design by architects Olga Papesh and Radomir Lalovikj.

It became a fully-fledged central bank in 1992 following the breakup of Yugoslavia. The Macedonian denar was first adopted as temporary currency on 26 April 1992.

In 2013 as part of the Skopje 2014 urban renewal project, the Macedonia government under Nikola Gruevski decided to erect a new neoclassical building for the National Bank. A construction contract was made in 2016, and the structure of the building was largely completed by 2019 but has remained unfinished since then. By 2024, there was still no tender for completion.

The National Bank changed its name to "Republic of North Macedonia" in 2019, following the Prespa Agreement.

== Governors ==
- Borko Stanoevski, 1986–1997
- Ljube Trpeski, 1997–2004
- Petar Goshev, 2004–2011
- Dimitar Bogov, May 2011 – May 2018
- Anita Angelovska-Bežoska, May 2018 – May 2025
- Trajko Slaveski, from May 2025

== See also ==
- Economy of North Macedonia
- List of central banks
- List of financial supervisory authorities by country
