= Tale Ognenovski =

Macedonian multi-instrumentalist (1922–2012)

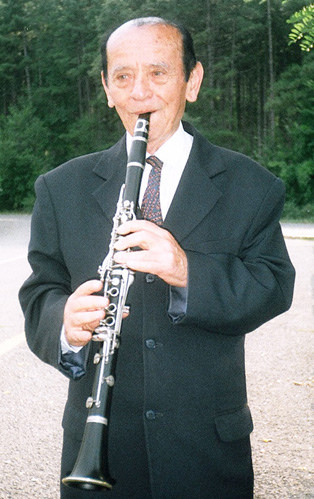
- Tale Ognenovski with his Buffet Crampon clarinet in 2006

Background information
- Born: Tale Ognenovski; April 27, 1922; Brusnik, Kingdom of Serbs, Croats and Slovenes
- Died: June 19, 2012 (aged 90) Skopje, Macedonia
- Genres: Jazz; classical; Macedonian folk
- Occupations: Musician; composer
- Instruments: Clarinet; recorder
- Years active: 1937–2012
- Labels: PGP-RTB, Jugoton, Macedonian Radio-Television
- Website: www.taleognenovski.mk

Tale Ognenovski (Macedonian: Тале Огненовски; April 27, 1922 – June 19, 2012) was a Macedonian multi-instrumentalist who played clarinet, recorder, tin whistle, bagpipe, zurna, and drums. He composed or arranged 300 instrumental compositions: Macedonian folk dances, jazz compositions, and classical concerts.

On January 27, 1956, he performed at Carnegie Hall in New York City as a clarinet and reed pipe (recorder) soloist of the Macedonian State Ensemble of Folk Dances and Songs.

For this Carnegie Hall concert The New York Times music critic John Martin, wrote two articles: "Ballet: Yugoslav Folk Art; 'Tanec' Dancers Appear at Carnegie Hall in Display of Tremendous Skill" ", published on January 28, 1956, and "The Dance: Folk Art; Group From Yugoslavia In Impressive Debut Learning vs. Magic No Macedonian Monopoly The Week's Events", published on February 5, 1956. Dance Observer commented, "The capacity audience at Carnegie Hall on January 27 for the single New York performance of Tanec, the Yugoslav National Folk Ballet, enjoyed a fascinating cross-section of over 2000 years of human history and culture. Tanec is a Macedonian group." Life commented, "This spring, the Yugoslav National Folk Ballet is making a first, and highly successful tour of the U.S...Together they make as vigorous a display of dancing as the U.S. has ever seen." Craig Harris at Allmusic noted for Macedonian National Ensemble for Folk Dances and Songs "Tanec" and clarinetist Tale Ognenovski, "The ensemble reached their peak during the late '50s, when influential clarinet and pipes player Tale Ognenovski was a member."

All About Jazz celebrated April 27, 2009, the birthday of Tale Ognenovski with All About Jazz recognition: Jazz Musician of the Day: Tale Ognenovski, with announcement published at his website. Tale Ognenovski won top honors on October 11, 2003, at Macedonian Parliament as the Winner of "11 October" Award, the highest and the most prestigious national award in Republic of Macedonia. Ognenovski was included in the book The Greatest Clarinet Players of All Time: Top 100 by Alex Trost and Vadim Kravetsky.

Tale Ognenovski and his son Stevan Ognenovski arranged for two clarinets Clarinet Concerto in A Major, K.622, composed by Wolfgang Amadeus Mozart and recorded the albums Mozart and Ognenovski Clarinet Concertos and Mozart Clarinet Concerto in A, K. 622 Arranged for Two Clarinets by Tale Ognenovski . Perhaps these two albums are unique recordings of this concert with two clarinets where first clarinet with first arrangement and second clarinet with second arrangement that's played simultaneously – by one performer (Tale Ognenovski). Top40-Charts News published an article entitled, "Mozart and Ognenovski Is the Best Clarinet Concertos in the World" on November 21, 2014.

== Childhood and early years ==
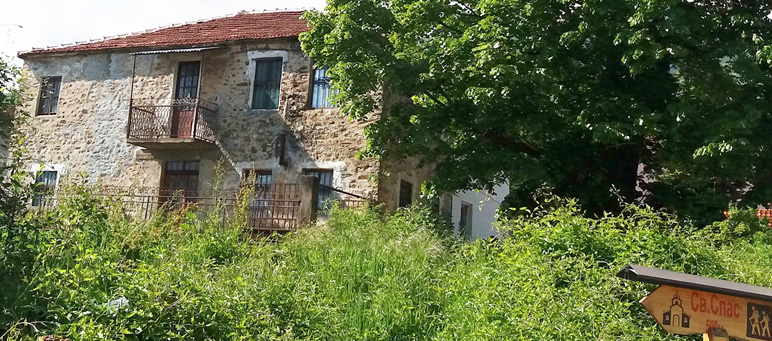
Tale Ognenovski's birthplace in Bitola

Ognenovski was born in Brusnik, Bitola, Kingdom of Yugoslavia. Tale Ognenovski inherited his talent from his great-grandfather Ognen and grandfather Risto, both of whom were players on the reed pipe (recorder), and from his father Jovan who was a player on the bagpipe. When Tale was 7 he began to play on the reed pipe (recorder). In 1933, his father Jovan died. By the time Tale was 15 (1937), Tale's grandmother Mara and mother Fanija (Vanka) provided some money to buy Tale his first clarinet, and the priest Spase helped them to order it from Celje, Slovenia.

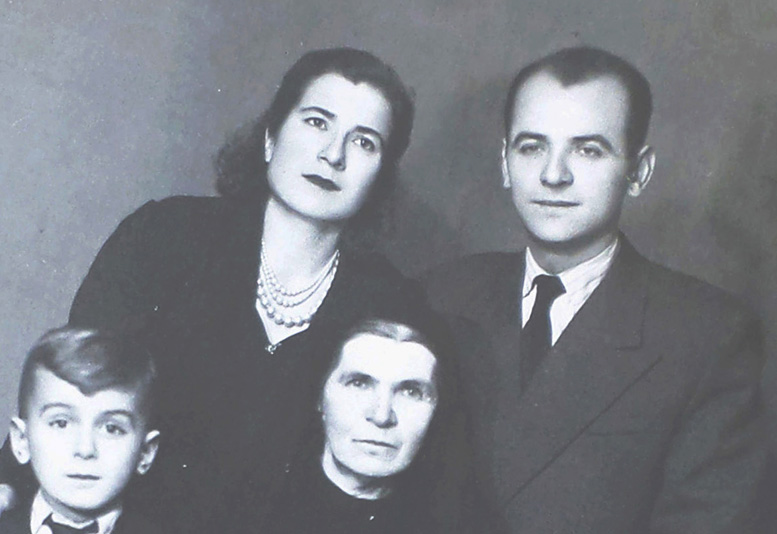
Tale Ognenovski, with his wife Nevena, son Stevan and mother Fanija (Vanka) in 1955.

Tale began to play the clarinet at many celebrations and concerts in villages and the town of Bitola with many other musicians.

== World War II (1941–1945) ==
Tale Ognenovski was Macedonian Partisan (1941 – 1945) and participated in the World War II in Yugoslav Macedonia as a member of the National Liberation Army and Partisan Detachments of Macedonia (Народноослободителна војска на Македонија) in many partisans units including: the National Liberation Bitola-Prespa partisan detachment "Dame Gruev" (Битолско-преспански партизански одред "Даме Груев"), the Bitola National Liberation partisan detachment "Goce Delchev" (Битолски партизански одред "Гоце Делчев"), the National Liberation "Mirche Acev Partisan Battalion" (Партизански баталјон "Мирче Ацев"), the "First Macedonian-Kosovo Partisan Assault brigade" (Прва македонско-косовска ударна бригада), the National Liberation partisan Battalion "Strasho Pindzur" (Народноослободителен баталјон "Страшо Пинџур"), the "Second Macedonian Assault Brigade" (Втора македонска ударна бригада) and the "Seventh Macedonian Assault Brigade" (Седма македонска ударна бригада). From September 11, 1944, to November 4, 1944, Tale Ognenovski was the commander-in-chief of the first partisan prison in the Democratic Federal Macedonia by decree of the Presidium (Президиум на АСНОМ) of Anti-fascist Assembly for the National Liberation of Macedonia (ASNOM) (Антифашистичко собрание на народното ослободување на Македонија). On September 11, 1944, the first partisan prison was located on the island of Golem Grad (Голем Град) on Lake Prespa (Преспанско Езеро). On September 21, 1944, in Bitola, in the Democratic Federal Macedonia and in its vicinity, large German forces were concentrated retreating from Greece and Albania) who fought hard with the Macedonian partisans from the "Seventh Macedonian Assault Brigade" and for the security of the first partisan prison he was moved from the island of Golem Grad on Prespa Lake to another safe location in Resen and later to another safe location in Bitola. Democratic Federal Macedonia was the name of Macedonia as a federal state within the newly proclaimed Democratic Federal Yugoslavia (Социјалистичка Федеративна Република Југославија). This name was used in the period from 1944 to March 8, 1946, when the Presidium of the National Assembly changed the law in the People's Republic of Macedonia. The National Liberation Army and Partisan Detachments of Macedonia, commanded by General Mihajlo Apostolski (Михајло Апостолски) was part of People's Liberation Army and partisans Detachment of Yugoslavia (Југословенски партизани) commanded by Josip Broz Tito (Јосип Броз - Тито) in the Second World War

For his active participation in Partisan National Liberation Army Tale Ognenovski (Тале Огненовски) was awarded with national decorations including: Commemorative Medal of the Partisans of 1941 (Macedonian: Партизанска споменица од 1941) (No. 25021 and Medal No. 24198) on June 20, 1961, in Belgrade, Federal People's Republic of Yugoslavia by decree signed by the Minister of Defense of the former Yugoslavia Minister, Army General Ivan Gošnjak and Order of Bravery (Yugoslavia) (Macedonian: Орден за храброст) (no. 97333, Ordinance no. 172 of 15.07.1949.) from Presidium of the National Assembly of the Democratic Federal Yugoslavia (Macedonian: "Орден за храброст", бр. 97333, Указ бр. 172 од 15.07.1949 год. од Президиум на Народното Собрание на Федеративна Народна Република Југославија). Tale Ognenovski received the "Memorial Plaque" by the Committee for the commemoration of the 40 year jubilee of the partisan detachments "Pelister", "Dame Gruev" and "Jane Sandanski" from the Municipal Conference of the socialist alliance of the working people of the Republic of Macedonia - Bitola on 12 September 1982 as a sign of recognition of belonging to the partisan detachments as member of the People's Liberation Army of Macedonia and Participation in the Yugoslav National Liberation War. He received as gift the book titled: "People's Liberation Partisans Units of Macedonia from Bitola" (Macedonian: Битолските Народно ослоботителни партизански одреди", издавач: "Друштвото за наука и уметност" од Битола, Република Македонија ") in the edition of "Association for Science and Arts" from Bitola, Republic of Macedonia" published in 1982. On the second page of this book is written as a tribute, the following words: "This book is gift to Tale Ognenovski, a member of the People's Liberation Partisan Unit of Macedonia "Goce Delchev" from Bitola as a sign of recognition on the occasion of the 50 anniversaries of the foundation of the Unit" – From "Union of the Associations veterans of the People's Liberation war of Macedonia from Municipality of Bitola", May 21, 1993. Tale received as gift plaque made of wood and metal on December 20, 1978, in town Negotino, Republic of Macedonia as Commemorative gift for 35th anniversary of the foundation of Second Macedonian Assault Brigade on December 20, 1943, in the village of Foustani (Фуштани) in Greece, where the "Second Macedonian Assault Brigade" was formed. In front of this gift plaque were engraved the words: "Second Macedonian Assault Brigade 1943 Fuštani Tale Ognenovski"

His brother Cane (Aleksandar) Ognenovski (1925 - April 1944; was Macedonian Partisan (1941 – 1945) and participated in the World War II in Yugoslav Macedonia as a member of the National Liberation Army and Partisan Detachments of Macedonia (Macedonian: Народноослободителна војска и партизански одреди на Македонија (НОВ и ПОМ)} and he died in the National Liberation War in April 1944. Posthumously on November 29, 1950, in Belgrade, Federal People's Republic of Yugoslavia, the Minister of Defense, Supreme Commander of the Yugoslav Army Josip Broz Tito awarded him a "Spomenica na padnatite borci - Monument to the Eternal Remembrance and Glory of the Fallen Fighters of the People's Liberation War of Yugoslavia" (Spomenica - Monument number 234705; (Macedonian: "Споменица за вечен спомен и слава на паднатите борци на Народноослободителна војна на Југославија" (број на Споменицата 234705)). Posthumously on September 12, 1982, in Bitola, Republic of Macedonia ("Memorial Plaque" was received by Tale Ognenovski) Cane (Aleksandar) Ognenovski received the "Memorial Plaque" by the Committee for the commemoration of the 40 year jubilee of the partisan detachments: "Pelister", "Dame Gruev" and "Jane Sandanski" from the Municipal Conference of the socialist alliance of the working people of the Republic of Macedonia - Bitola on 12 September 1982 as a sign of recognition of belonging to the partisan detachments as member of the People's Liberation Army of Macedonia and Participation in the Yugoslav National Liberation War. His mother Fanija (Vanka) Ognenovska) was a participant in the 1941 National Liberation War of Macedonia and for her merits for the freedom of Macedonia she received a national pension by Decision of the Administrative Commission of the government of Socialist Federal Republic of Yugoslavia, number 05-4010 from 1962 and number 58-689 / 65 (P.br. 3052) from 01.01.1965. Josip Broz Tito, President of the Federal People's Republic of Yugoslavia, awarded her with the decoration Order of Merits for the People with Silver Rays (Macedonian: Орден на заслуги за народот со сребрена звезда) by Decree no. 197 of December 7, 1963, for organizing and strengthening the national defense, security and independence of the country and its participation in the People's Liberation War of Macedonia and Yugoslavia in the Second World War (1941 - 1945). Her house in the village of Brusnik, Bitola, was used for holding meetings and connections of the communist party organization with the partisan detachments

Pande Tashkoski in his book entitled "Consistent with the vow" ((Macedonian: ("Доследни на заветот") on page 65 wrote: "Tale Ognenovski, played the clarinet very well. He learned to play himself. He was a famous and popular clarinetist in Bitola. Everyone considered him the best..." On June 21, 1943, in the forest near the village of Lavci, Bitola region, Tale Ognenovski told to his comrades the partisans Pande Tashkoski, Pande Jovchevski - Kajzero and Jonche Savevski from the Bitola National Liberation partisan detachment "Goce Delchev": "If I stay alive, I promise after the war, I will dedicate myself to music. I will master the notes and play in a big orchestra." This is written on page 67 of Pande Tashkoski's book entitled: "Consistent with the vow" (Macedonian: ("Доследни на заветот"). The vow that Tale Ognenovski made on June 21, 1943, in the forest near the village of Lavci and which Tale Ognenovski fulfilled his promise after the war: Tale Ognenovski performed as clarinet and reed pipe ('kavalche') soloist with Macedonian National Ensemble for Folk Dances and Songs "Tanec" in Carnegie Hall, New York City, US on January 27, 1956. For this Carnegie Hall concert The New York Times music critic John Martin wrote two articles: "Ballet: Yugoslav Folk Art; 'Tanec' Dancers Appear at Carnegie Hall in Display of Tremendous Skill", published on January 28, 1956, and "The Dance: Folk Art; Group From Yugoslavia In Impressive Debut Learning vs. Magic No Macedonian Monopoly The Week's Events", published on February 5, 1956, and He composed or arranged 300 instrumental compositions: Macedonian folk dances, jazz compositions and classical concerts: Tale Ognenovski and his son Stevan Ognenovski arranged for two clarinets Clarinet Concerto in A Major, K.622, composed by Wolfgang Amadeus Mozart and recorded the albums: Mozart and Ognenovski Clarinet Concertos and Mozart Clarinet Concerto in A, K. 622 Arranged for Two Clarinets by Tale Ognenovski. was the inspiration for writer Pande Tashkoski to name the title of his book "Consistent with the vow" ((Macedonian: ("Доследни на заветот")

16 partisans, part of the fighters members of the Bitola partisan detachment for national liberation "Goce Delchev": Pande Jovchevski – Kajzero (Панде Кајзеро), Todor Angelovski (Tosho Daskalot – Strogov) (Тодор Ангелевски), Pande Tashkovski, Fana Kochovska (Фана Кочовска-Цветковиќ), Tale Ognenovski (Тале Огненовски), Cane (Aleksandar) Ognenovski (brother of Tale Ognenovski), Sotir Brbeski – Ilo, Krste Samarkovski – Vele, Peco Gudovski – Mustaklijata, Milan Ilievski – Sasho, Jonche Savevski, Krste Shaprevski - Vele, Sotir Brbeski - Ilo, Josif Nedelkovski – None, Tode Derioski – Kumo and Vasko Karangelevski, they were surrounded by the Bulgarian police and army in the village of Lavci, Bitola and near the village and in an unequal fight on June 22, 1943, the partisan Pande Jovchevski - Kaisero died in a fight killing 11 Bulgarian policemen and 3 Bulgarian soldiers near village of Lavci, Bitola and the next day on June 23, 1943, Todor Angelovski (Tosho Daskalot - Strogov) died in a fight with the Bulgarian police and the Bulgarian army in the village of Lavci, Bitola. The other partisans broke through the ring, fighting with the Bulgarian police and Bulgarian army. From March 1943, Todor Angelovski (Tosho Daskalot – Strogov) was Commander of the Headquarters of the Second Operational Zone of the General Staff of the People's Liberation Army and the partisan detachments of Macedonia. The events described on June 22 and 23, 1943, which took place in the village of Lavci, Bitola and in its vicinity, and are described in the books entitled: book "Consistent with the vow" ((Macedonian: ("Доследни на заветот") and in the film (Macedonian: (" Македонски дел од пеколот ") ("Macedonian Part of Hell"

Tale Ognenovski was present on 11 November 1943 in the village of Slivovo, Republic of Macedonia (Сливово), Republic of Macedonia where the "First Macedonian-Kosovo Assault brigade was formed together with his brother Cane (Aleksandar) Ognenovski and together with the other 800 fighters ". Fighters of the "First Macedonian-Kosovo Assault brigade" were, the partisans: Fana Kochovska (Фана Кочовска-Цветковиќ), Mitrevski Vidan – Krste (Gospod), Naum Veslievski Ovcharot (Наум Веслиевски), Petar Brajović Buro (Петар Брајовић), Commander of "First Macedonian-Kosovo Assault brigade", Čede Filipovski Dame (Чеде Филиповски - Даме), Deputy Commander of "First Macedonian-Kosovo Assault brigade"... The member of the Supreme Headquarters of the People's Liberation Army and Partisan Detachments of Yugoslavia and delegate of the Central Committee of the League of Communists of Yugoslavia Svetozar Vukmanović (Светозар Вукмановиќ – Темпо), announced the formation of the "First Macedonian-Kosovo Assault brigade" and gave a speech on the occasion of the formation of the brigade. From November 14, 1943, the brigade fought several battles with the German and Bulgarian armies in the vicinity of Kicevo, Veles, Brod, Krushevo, Debar, Demir Hisar, Resen ... On the night of December 5, 1943, the brigade started marching from the village of Slivovo (together with the brigade was also the General Staff and the Central Committee of Macedonia) through the mountain Galicica between Prespa and Lake Ohrid, through the Albanian crossed the Greek territory and on December 9 took a vacation in the village of German (Герман (Леринско)). The inhabitants of the village were delighted with the arrival of the Parisians and a popular celebration took place at which the clarinetist Tale Ognenovski, who was also a Macedonian partisan and a fighter of the brigade, played. On December 17, 1943, passing 300 km in 11 days, the brigade arrived in the village of Fushtani together with the General Staff and the Central Committee of Macedonia. On December 20, 1943, the Second Macedonian Assault Brigade was formed in the village of Foustani (Фуштани) in Greece, consisting of 500 fighters. Tale Ognenovski with his brother Cane (Aleksandar) Ognenovski were present at formation of Second Macedonian Assault Brigade in the village of Foustani (Фуштани) in Greece. The Commander of the "Second Macedonian Assault Brigade" was Dimche Turimandzovski (Диме Туриманџовски) and his Deputy was Lazo Kalajdziski (Лазар Калајџиски). The member of the Supreme Headquarters of the People's Liberation Army and Partisan Detachments of Yugoslavia and delegate of the Central Committee of the League of Communists of Yugoslavia Svetozar Vukmanović (Светозар Вукмановиќ – Темпо) and General Mihajlo Apostolski (Михајло Апостолски), Commander of The People's Liberation Army of Macedonia were present at formation of "Second Macedonian Assault Brigade" on December 20, 1943. From 7,000 partisans in the late 1943, until the final military operations in the Yugoslav National Liberation War in April 1945, the National Liberation Army and Partisan Detachments of Macedonia (Народноослободителна војска на Македонија) with a total of 100,000 regular soldiers Republic of Macedonia gained the respect of its allies through its contribution to the victory over fascism. The National Liberation Army and Partisan Detachments of Macedonia, commanded by General Mihajlo Apostolski (Михајло Апостолски) was part of People's Liberation Army and partisans Detachment of Yugoslavia (Југословенски партизани) commanded by Josip Broz Tito (Јосип Броз - Тито) in the Second World War

== Career ==
=== Awards ===
He received the First Award at the first regional Bitola Festival of Folk Dances and Songs, held in 1947.

He received the First Award Clarinet as the best clarinetist at the first Macedonia Festival of Folk Dances and Songs, held in Skopje in 1948. He received the First Award at the Yugoslav (Former Yugoslavia) Folk Music Festival in Opatija, Croatia, in 1951, together with another 11 members of the Folk Dance Ensemble from the Bitola village of Nizhopole, Republic of Macedonia.

The performance of Tale Ognenovski as clarinet player caught the attention of the editors of International Folk Music Journal, also noted that "Teshkoto from Nizopole (Bitolj) means "heavy", and indicates the heavy rhythm which is typical of very ancient dances."

==== "11 October" Award ====
Tale Ognenovski received the "11 October" Award, the highest national award in Republic of Macedonia in the Assembly of the Republic of Macedonia, Skopje, Republic of Macedonia in 2003 for his contributions to Macedonian culture.

In a 2003 interview, Tale Ognenovski commented: "On October, 2001, was released my CD Album entitled, "Jazz, Macedonian Folk Dances and Classical Music." ...This album is confirmation that I am the greatest clarinetist of all time and one of the greatest composers in the world of music. My sincere gratitude for I won top honours as the winner of 11 October award... This Award gave me inspiration for new composing...".

=== Police Wind Orchestra ===
From 1951 till 1954, Tale Ognenovski worked as a member of the "Police Wind Orchestra" and from 1954 till 1956, he worked with the "Public Town Skopje Orchestra". The repertoire for both of these Orchestras consisted classical works. These included Bizet's "Carmen", "The Troubadour", "Aida", "Rigoletto", Verdi's "Nabucco" and "La traviata", "Oberon" by Carl Maria von Weber, Tchaikovsky's "1812 Overture", Puccini's "Tosca" and Rossini's "The Barber of Seville". In December 1952, Tale Ognenovski as clarinet soloist, together with the pianist Nino Cipushev as accompaniment, performed the classical concert "Concert Polka for Clarinet" by Miler Bela in the "Police House" in Skopje. On May 24, 1953, he played clarinet soloist in the same concert with accompaniment of "Police Wind Orchestra". The concert was performed in the Radio Skopje building, and broadcast directly to the nation via Radio Skopje. In Vardar Film's 1955 production of "Ritam i zvuk" ("Rhythm and Sound"), Tale Ognenovski as a clarinet soloist performed the Macedonian folk dances "Zhensko Chamche" and "Beranche" with Ensemble "Tanec". From 1956 till 1960 he worked with the Macedonian State Ensemble of Folk Dances and Songs "Tanec".

=== Macedonian Radio-Television ===
From 1960 to 1967, Tale Ognenovski worked with "Radio Television Skopje" (now Macedonian Radio-Television). During 1967, he recorded as accompaniment on the clarinet many records on magnetic tapes with the "Tancov" Orchestra of Radio Television Skopje. In 1966, Tale Ognenovski became Head of the "Folk Music Orchestra" of "Radio Television Skopje". In 1967 Tale Ognenovski retired, but he continued to play on an honorary basis in the "Chalgii" Orchestra on "Radio Television Skopje" until 1979. He recorded as clarinet and reed pipe (recorder) soloist many records on magnetic tapes with the "Folk Music Orchestra", the "Chalgii" Orchestra and the Authentic Folk Instruments Orchestra including 150 Macedonian folk dances all composed by him. During the 1960s Tale Ognenovski played as clarinet soloist in many Macedonian folk dances and songs in numerous theatrical performances at the Macedonian National Theatre.

=== Guest soloist at anniversaries ===
He performed at: the concert marking the 25th anniversary of the founding of "Radio Television Skopje" (now Macedonian Radio-Television), performed in the Universal Hall in Skopje on December 19, 1969, the concert marking the 30th anniversary of the founding of the Cultural Artistical Society "Ilinden" in Bitola, held in the "House of Culture", Bitola in December 1985 and at the concert marking the 60th anniversary of the founding of "Radio Television Belgrade" (now Radio Television Serbia) held in the "House of the Syndicate" in Belgrade, Serbia in 1989. Tale Ognenovski performed his own compositions of Macedonian folk dances on the television programme "Yugoslavia, Good Day" broadcast on "Radio Television Zagreb" (now Croatian Radiotelevision) in Croatia, February 27, 1975.

=== Orchestras and ensembles ===
He has played on the clarinet in many concerts performing with the following orchestras and ensembles: the cultural-educational societies in Bitola of "Svetlost", "Stiv Naumov", "Ilinden"; folk dance groups from the villages of Brusnik, Dihovo, Nizhopole, Rotino and Lavci; the Radio Bitola orchestras; cultural art societies: "Vlado Tasevski" and "Kocho Racin"; the academic culture and art society "Mirche Acev; other Ensembles of folk dances and songs including "Orce Nikolov", "Goce Delchev", "Dom na gradezhnici Skopje", "Hor na invalidi Skopje" and "Dom na borci i invalidi Skopje"; the Macedonia Radio and Television folk music orchestras: the Folk Music Orchestra, the "Chalgii" Orchestra and the Authentic Folk Instruments Orchestra; the Orchestra of Angel Nacevski, Stevo Teodosievski, Pece Atanasovski and the Ljupcho Pandilov Orchestra.

=== International Folklore Committee ===
At the International Folklore Conference organized by the International Folklore Committee in Istanbul, Turkey, 1977, on the subject of "Folklore on the Radio" representative from Yugoslavian Radio Television (Former Yugoslavia) was Dushko Dimitrovski, Editor of the Folk Music Department for "Radio Television Skopje" (now Macedonian Radio-Television) from the Republic of Macedonia. He used records produced from magnetic tapes to present folklore material in his presentation entitled " Chalgija music in Macedonia". This folklore material was prepared in Skopje by ethnomusicologists Dushko Dimitrovski, Kiril Todevski and Metodija Simonovski. From the magnetic tape material were presented the recordings including the Macedonian folk dances: "Kasapsko oro", arranged by Tale Ognenovski, and "Kumovo oro chochek", composed by Tale Ognenovski and performed by him as clarinet soloist accompanied by the "Chalgii" orchestra of Radio Television Skopje (now Macedonian Radio-Television). This created great interest not only amongst the delegates of the Conference but also around the world.

== Tour of North America ==
Tale Ognenovski played as clarinet and reed pipe (recorder) soloist for most parts of the programme, including the Macedonian folk dances "Bride's Dance" ("Nevestinsko Oro"), "Chupurlika", "Sopska Poskocica" ("Shopska Podripnuvachka"), "Kopachka", "Shepherd's Dance" ("Ovcharsko Oro"), "Soborski Igri", Macedonian songs, Serbian folk dances and songs and "Shote", an Albanian folk dance.

He toured North America from January to April 1956.

=== Arriving in New York City ===
The popularity of the Ensemble Tanec's music in Europe brought with it increasing press attention in North America before and during the tour of North America. The New York Times published a series of articles in which offered detailed analyses of the Ensemble "Tanec"'s music, lending it respectability.

The Ensemble arrived in New York City on January 20, 1956. The North America tour began on January 22, 1956, and finished on April 12, 1956. Ensemble "Tanec" performed 65 concerts in 50 cities.

=== TV debut on CBS ===
Tanec's North American tour began with their debut on the Ford Foundation TV Programme Omnibus (U.S. TV series) on January 22, 1956. Producer Robert Saudek, directed by Elliot Silverstein with the Tanec dance troupe from Macedonia.Live performances of members of Ensemble "Tanec" on CBS were seen by millions viewers and created interest in all 66 concerts in many towns throughout the United States and in Toronto, Ontario, Canada. A copy of this programme may be viewed free of charge on a videocassette at the Library of Congress in Washington, D.C. CBS Omnibus was educational TV series, broadcast live on Sunday afternoons from November 9, 1952, until 1961. The program includes featured performances by many artists, including Orson Welles and Leonard Bernstein.

=== Carnegie Hall concert ===
The ensemble "Tanec" performed at Carnegie Hall on January 27, 1956. Stjepan Pucak, former Tanjug correspondent and Croatian journalist note: "Until half-past eight, Carnegie Hall was full to capacity, without any of its near enough 3000 seats available...To choose which were the most successful of the program's seventeen folk dances, when all were greeted with stormy applause, is really very difficult and risky... 'Sopska Poskocica' ('Shopska podripnuvachka') was even repeated, and to repeat a performance on the American stage is a really rare and exclusive event." Naum Nachevski, former correspondent of Nova Makedonija from US and Macedonian journalist, noted: "On many occasions the audience interrupted some of the folk dance performances with applause; these dances in particular left great impressions of the folklore, the richness of folk costumes and the unusual rhythm of Macedonian folk music. 'Tanec' not only received a warm welcome from the New York public, but also from the New York press who the following day were full of the most beautiful compliments."

=== U.S. tour ===
The strong reception of Ensemble "Tanec" performance at Carnegie Hall by public and by music critic, generating intense interest for, the three months-long tour to each two-hour performance in cities from San Francisco to New York. A further sixty four successful concerts followed in other US cities and one concert in Toronto, Ontario, Canada. Performances of Ensemble "Tanec" everywhere, on tour across the North America, were greeted with enthusiasm by spectators.

Makedonija reviewer Naum Nachevski comments: "All the concerts have had record audiences. In many towns, including Pittsburgh, they are sold out at least one week before...For America, this art form is quite new - totally original - never before viewed on the mainland... The American public has expressed this through their frenetic applause."

Three concerts in Chicago were performed in Civic Opera House on February 4 on February 5, 1956. Its opera house has 3,563-seats, making it the second-largest opera auditorium in North America after the Metropolitan Opera House in New York.

The Chicago Daily Tribune reviewer, Claudia Cassidy, noted: "Called Tanec, which is the Macedonian word for dance, this group of 37 dancers, singers and musicians is a kaleidoscope of the Balkans...When five of them dance the "Sopska Poskocica", which apparently just means they are showing off to the girls. I would keep them any day as an unfair trade for the four little swans in Swan Lake.

"The arrival of Tanec in Chicago had been awaited by more than 10,000 people who had bought their tickets a few weeks earlier. ...Several million people got to know about our folk dances from reports and photographs, from a very successful debut on American television and from reviews in the newspapers about the concert in New York...Chupurlika was greeted with stormy applause and received several encores." wrote Gjorgi Iliev from Chicago in an article entitled "Letter from America", appearing in the newspaper Nova Makedonij, Republic of Macedonia on February 19, 1956."

The concert in Philadelphia was performed in the 2,897-seats Academy of Music on February 7, 1956. Opened in 1857, the Academy of Music is the oldest grand opera house in the United States to still be used for its original purpose.

The Philadelphia Inquirer music critic Samuel Singer commented, "'Tanec' means 'dance', but 'dance' in a larger form than customary. Besides dance alone, it conveys drama, ritual, tradition, songs, even military maneuvers...there was a remarkable precision in both dancing and playing...Clarinet, bass fiddle, violin, drums, guitar and flute provided most of the accompaniments in various combinations..."

DAR Constitution Hall (3,702 seats) is a concert hall in Washington, D.C. It was built in 1929.

Paul Hume, the Washington Post and Times music critic observed, "A Sopska Poskocica is devised to show the girls how handsome and wonderful and brilliant and exciting and sensational their man friends are. The rate at which it is danced, and the tremendous energy and precision of six men who dance it, is unique and demanded a repetition...If you see "Tanec" which simply means 'Dance' advertised again, you won't want to miss it."

Massey Hall (2,752-seats) is a performing arts theatre in Toronto, Ontario, Canada.

John Kraglund, a music critic for The Globe and Mail wrote: "The first impression, however, must be one of rhythmic precision...Nor was the performance without spectacle...in the case of one dance, Sopska Poskocica, it was no more than a show-off dance. As such it was highly effective".

Ensemble Tanec played in larger auditoriums, including, Kiel Auditorium, St. Louis, Missouri on February 26, 1956, and Denver Arena Auditorium, Colorado, on March 4, 1956. Kiel Auditorium (originally named the Municipal Auditorium) with seating capacity of 9,300 played host to a variety of rock concerts including concerts by Elvis Presley on March 29, 1957 and September 10, 1970. From the 1950s until the 1970s, the Kiel Auditorium was behind only Madison Square Garden as North America's most famous wrestling arena.

Denver Arena Auditorium is a pure sporting venue with seating capacity of 6,841. On December 26, 1968, the rock group Led Zeppelin played their first concert in the United States.

"The concert created stormy applause from 2000 spectators..." wrote the St. Louis Globe-Democrat. "The Auditorium Arena concert of Ensemble "Tanec" is the most extraordinary event of the year...the most excellent are "Soborskite igri"" wrote the Denver Rocky Mountain News." The above all appeared in an article in the newspaper Nova Makedonija, published on April 24, 1956, and entitled "Success of Macedonian Folk Ensemble "Tanec.""

The War Memorial Opera House in San Francisco, California, has 3,146 seats. It has been the home of the San Francisco Opera since opening night in 1932.

San Francisco Chronicle music critic R. H. Hagan says of the Macedonian Music, "The music itself – including several indigenous instruments – is worth the price of the show, and never more so than in a number titled simply "Macedonian Tune", which in its intricate rhythms and plaintive melody should at least make Dave Brubeck send out an emergency call for Darius Milhaud".

The three concerts in Los Angeles were performed in Philharmonic Auditorium (2,700 seats) on March 12, 13 and 14, 1956. Los Angeles Times music critic Albert Goldberg commented: "For authentic folk dancing, wild and free and yet subject to its own intricate disciplines, this group would be hard to beat. It numbers over 30 dancers, singers and musicians and they do the dances of Macedonia, Croatia, Serbia, Herzegovina and Albania in native costumes with superb vitality and style...They are accompanied by a group of musicians consisting of a violinist, guitar and accordion players, a flutist, a clarinetist and double bass, though drums of different types are frequently involved, as well as a shepherd's reed pipe" After the concerts, the audience surrounded the members of Ensemble "Tanec" and asked for theirs autographs.

Members of Ensemble Tanec visited the Metro Goldwyn Mayer studio in Hollywood. In the main MGM studio, Tale Ognenovski and other members of the Ensemble were photographed together with June Allyson. MGM prepared a special banquet for the members the ensemble.

Dance Observer commented: "The capacity audience at Carnegie Hall on January 27 for the single New York performance of Tanec, the Yugoslav National Folk Ballet, enjoyed a fascinating cross-section of over 2000 years of human history and culture. Tanec is a Macedonian group"

== Live performances (1956) ==
DATE	CITY	THEATRE
January 22, 1956	New York City	TV program Omnibus
January 23, 1956	Harrisburg, Pennsylvania	The Forum
January 24, 1956	White Plains, New York	Westchester Country Center
January 25, 1956	Schenectady, New York	Erie Theater
January 26, 1956	Perth Amboy, New Jersey	Majestic Theater
January 27, 1956	New York City	Carnegie Hall
January 28, 1956	Newark, New Jersey	Mosque Theater
January 29, 1956	Worcester, Massachusetts	Municipal Memorial Auditorium
January 30, 1956	Providence, Rhode Island	War Memory Auditorium
January 31, 1956	Boston, Massachusetts	Symphony Hall
February 1, 1956	Springfield, Massachusetts	Auditorium
February 2, 1956	Hartford, Connecticut	Bushnell Memorial Hall
February 4, 1956	Chicago, Illinois	Chicago Civic Opera House
February 5, 1956	Chicago, Illinois	Chicago Civic Opera House
February 7, 1956	Philadelphia, Pennsylvania	Academy of Music
February 8, 1956	Norfolk, Pennsylvania	Center Theater
February 9, 1956	Washington, D.C.	Constitution Hall
February 10, 1956	Baltimore, Maryland	Lyric Theater
February 11, 1956	Richmond, Virginia	Mosque Theater
February 12, 1956	Pittsburgh, Pennsylvania	Syria Mosque Theater
February 13, 1956	Toronto, Ontario, Canada	Massey Hall
February 14, 1956	Rochester, New York	Auditorium
February 16, 1956	Youngstown, Ohio	Stambaugh Auditorium
February 17, 1956	Akron, Ohio	Armory
February 18, 1956	Detroit, Michigan	Masonic Auditorium
February 19, 1956	Cleveland, Ohio	Music Hall
February 20, 1956	Indianapolis, Indiana	Murat Theater
February 21, 1956	Toledo, Ohio	State Theater
February 22, 1956	Cincinnati, Ohio	Taft Auditorium
February 23, 1956	Louisville, Kentucky	Kentucky Auditorium
February 24, 1956	Evansville, Indiana	Indiana Coliseum
February 26, 1956	St. Louis, Missouri	Municipal Auditorium
February 28, 1956	St. Joseph, Missouri	City Auditorium
February 29, 1956	Kansas City, Missouri	Music Hall
March 1, 1956	Omaha, Nebraska	Music Hall
March 3, 1956	Colorado Springs, Colorado	City Auditorium
March 4, 1956	Denver, Colorado	Auditorium Arena
March 7, 1956	San Francisco, California	Opera House
March 8, 1956	Sacramento, California	Memorial Auditorium
March 9, 1956	San Francisco, California	Opera House
March 10, 1956	Oakland, California	High School Auditorium
March 11, 1956	Fresno, California	Armory
March 12, 1956	Los Angeles, California	Philharmonic Auditorium
March 13, 1956	Los Angeles, California	Philharmonic Auditorium
March 14, 1956	Los Angeles, California	Philharmonic Auditorium
March 15, 1956	Pasadena, California	Civic Auditorium
March 17, 1956	San Pedro, California	S.P.High School Auditorium
March 18, 1956	San Pedro, California	S.P.High School Auditorium
March 19, 1956	San Diego, California	Russ Auditorium
March 20, 1956	San Diego, California	Russ Auditorium
March 22, 1956	Phoenix, Arizona	North Phoenix High School
March 23, 1956	Phoenix, Arizona	North Phoenix High School
March 24, 1956	Tucson, Arizona	University
March 26, 1956	El Paso, Texas	Liberty Hall
March 28, 1956	Houston, Texas	City Auditorium
March 29, 1956	Houston, Texas	City Auditorium
April 1, 1956	New Orleans, Louisiana	Civic Theatre
April 2, 1956	New Orleans, Louisiana	Civic Theatre
April 3, 1956	New Orleans, Louisiana	Civic Theatre
April 5, 1956	Atlanta, Georgia	Tower Theatre
April 6, 1956	Atlanta, Georgia	Tower Theatre
April 7, 1956	Atlanta, Georgia	Tower Theatre
April 9, 1956	Princeton, New Jersey	McCarter Theatre
April 10, 1956	Princeton, New Jersey	McCarter Theatre
April 11, 1956	New York City	Brooklyn Academy of Music
April 12, 1956	New York City	Brooklyn Academy of Music

The North America tour began on January 22, 1956, and finished on April 12, 1956. Ensemble "Tanec" performed 65 concerts in 50 cities.

== Tour of Germany ==
Tale Ognenovski as clarinet and reed pipe (recorder) soloist with Ensemble 'Tanec', toured Germany from August 15 until October 27, 1956. The Ensemble performed 72 concerts in many towns, including Stuttgart, Frankfurt, Bonn, Göttingen, Munich and Wiesbaden, and every performance was a sell-out. As part of their tour of France in 1959, they performed two concerts in Dortmund, Germany on September 18 and 19, 1959, playing to an audience of 7000 on each occasion.

On October 1, 1956, Ensemble "Tanec" performed a concert in Bonn Town Theatre and every seat was full. "Present in the audience were the Mayor of Bonn, many politicians, diplomats and domestic and foreign journalists. Bonn's newspapers are full of numerous reports as to the artistic quality of the concert."During this tour the Ensemble has visited almost all the larger towns in West Germany, and also many tourist towns."

The Hildesheim Press published an article entitled "Tanec, the magic word from the Balkans". This contained amongst other comments, "This National Ballet, the top Ensemble in the country, have shown us only excellence, politeness and complete perfection. I'll never forget the difficult Macedonian dance from Macedonian shepherds... and the man with the reed pipe... Every dance and song has great impact and is rewarded with extraordinary amounts of applause. 'Tanec' in Yugoslavia means 'dance', and at the same time it is a magical word from Yugoslavia."

== Tour of Switzerland ==
Tale Ognenovski performed as clarinet and reed pipe (recorder) soloist with Ensemble "Tanec" during their tour of Switzerland during the period July 7–10, 1959. The concerts were performed in Bern on July 7 and 8, 1959. In the illuminated gardens of Port Gitana, in Geneva on July 9 and 10, 1959 at 8.00 pm, Ensemble "Tanec" performed with success. Tale Ognenovski made his debut on a special programme broadcast on Swiss Television. Playing as clarinet soloist, he performed his personally composed Macedonian folk dances "Bitolsko Oro" and "Brusnichko Oro".

== Tour of France ==
Tale Ognenovski was clarinet and reed pipe (recorder) soloist with Ensemble "Tanec" during their tour of France from September 20 until November 25, 1959. They performed 83 concerts in 58 towns and cities in France. The Ensemble twice had performances broadcast on television, on September 21 and 22, 1959. 20 million people would have seen them on the most popular programme on Television in France. Radio Paris recorded a 45-minute programme of Macedonian folk dances and songs.The first concert in France was performed on the stage of the Grand Palais in Bourges on September 23, 1959."

On every concert including at 'Hall of the sports' in Shamoni audience consisted mostly of young people greeted the performers warmly. Every evening after the concerts, hundreds of boys and girls came under the stage to get autographs from the members of Ensemble "Tanec". At every concert audiences asked for encores of some of the acts. The Manager of Ensemble 'Tanec's tour of France was Raymond Guillier, also Director of his own company "Les grands spectacles internationaux Les productions Raymond Guillier", Paris. He specialized in managing international shows in Paris.

Other tours included Bulgaria (November and December 1955), Albania (9 concerts, October, 1957), Romania (9 concerts, December 1957 and January 1958), Bosnia and Herzegovina, Montenegro, Slovenia, Serbia and Croatia.

== Compositions and recordings ==
=== Macedonian folk dances ===
Tale Ognenovski has composed or arranged 300 instrumental compositions: Macedonian folk dances, jazz compositions, classical concerts... which were performed and recorded by Tale Ognenovski on various record labels. Some of his compositions have been recorded on 11 LPs, 11 cassettes and 10 gramophone records. Labels: PGP RTB (Radio Television Belgrade), Serbia; Jugoton, Zagreb, Croatia; Macedonian Radio-Television Republic of Macedonia and Independent Records, US.

He made his recording debut as a composer with the Galevski-Nanchevski Orchestra in 1963, with the first record EP 14700 produced by PGP RTB - "Radio Televizija Beograd" (Radio Television Belgrade (now Radio Television Serbia), Belgrade, Serbia). In 1965, Tale Ognenovski established his own "Tale Ognenovski Orchestra", and PGP RTB produces the record EP 14711, He made his recording debut for Jugoton Zagreb, Croatia with the record EPY-3851 (1967).

=== Debut for Jugoton and PGP-RTB ===
In 1975, Ognenovski made his debut LP recording "Tale Ognenovski Klarinet Svira Ora" (LPY-61143) for Jugoton in Zagreb, Croatia. The sessions yielded twelve folk dances, including "Resensko Oro" and "Mominsko Oro".

In 1979 PGP-RTB in Belgrade, Serbia released Ognenovski's LP album "Makedonski Igraorni Ora Sviri Tale Ognenovski (LP 1439). All 12 tracks were Macedonian folk dances including "Talevo Svadbarsko Oro" and "Caparsko Oro".

On the back cover of this LP record Gjoko Georgiev, editor of music for Macedonian Radio-Television Skopje, wrote: "This record allows you to hear the unique, famous, music personality, the solo clarinetist Tale Ognenovski. When hearing the music, you will feel exhilarating folklore all around you, of the sunny, sad and bright legend of the south being transferred into music... During the last couple of decades he has continuously demonstrated his skill at original and superb interpretation, displaying the passion of one that is in love, and the style of a virtuoso."

The magazine "Ilustrovana politika" observes,"Radio Television Belgrade released a LP of Macedonian folk music, on which is performances by the extraordinary clarinetist Tale Ognenovski. His music repertoire is folk dances, jazz (besides others he includes works by Benny Goodman and Artie Shaw), concerts from Carl Maria von Weber Mozart and Ernesto Cavallini...This is Tale Ognenovski who began to play the clarinet in the village of Brusnik near Bitola, who with this wooden instrument toured the world and received well-deserved applause wherever he performed." Macedonian Radio-Television produced the cassette MP 2137 (1989).

=== Jazz, Macedonian Folk Dances and Classical Music ===
The Tale Ognenovski Quartet in May, 2001

In 2001 Tale Ognenovski formed Quartet with his son, Stevan on drum and reed pipe (recorder) and grandsons Nikola on reed pipe and Kliment on reed pipe. Tale Ognenovski is soloist on clarinet, reed pipe (recorder), tin whistle, small bagpipe and zourla (zurla). In September, 2001 was released CD album: Jazz, Macedonian Folk Dances and Classical Music (IR04542, Independent Records, US). Ten tracks were recorded for this album: 3 Jazz compositions, 6 Macedonian Folk dances and Tale Ognenovski Concert for Clarinet No. 1, all composed by Tale Ognenovski. Dimitar Dimovski, recorded, mixed and mastered four CD Albums of Tale Ognenovski at "Promuzika TRA-LA-LA Studio", Skopje, Republic of Macedonia.

Reviewer Neil Horner of the MusicWeb International comments, "He is undoubtedly an exceptional artist and the predominant image created in my mind is of Benny Goodman playing the superb Contrasts he commissioned Bartók to write for him, but with a folk rather than a classical emphasis... Also, despite the CD promising jazz, folk and classical, it really all comes under the umbrella of his conception of how the elements interlink, with some but not major differences of emphasis...This disc is likely to appeal to world music aficionados who enjoy the Balkan/Levantine soundworld and perhaps also those who care to hear the source musics of their classical favourites, the aforementioned Bartók but also, here, perhaps people like Skalkottas."

=== Classical music ===
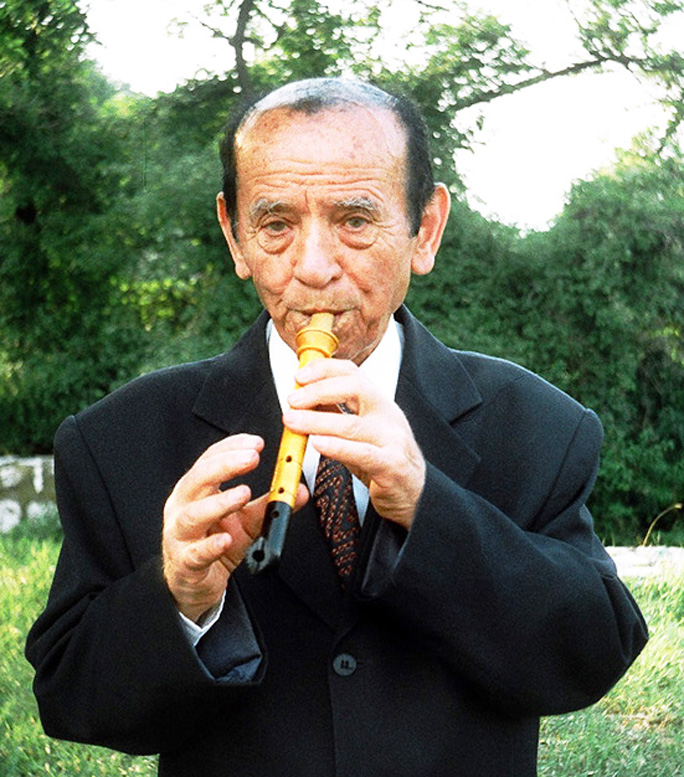
Tale Ognenovski, with his small bagpipe in Vodno Mountain, Skopje, Republic of Macedonia in 2006

Ognenovski's first classical recording dates from 1970, when he recorded Ernesto Cavallini: Fiori rossiniani with pianist Professor Ladislav Palfi for Macedonian Radio-Television. In 1987 he recorded Mozart's Clarinet Concerto in A Major K.622 (Clarinet Concerto (Mozart) and Wagner's "Adagio for Clarinet" with pianist Tanja Shopova. Macedonian national television "Macedonian Radio-Television" produced two television programmes: "One clarinet - one life" was shown on May 19, 1970, and "One clarinet - one life - Tale Ognenovski", broadcast on July 18, 1987. Both programmes include his biography and performances of classical music and Macedonian folk dances.

In 2005 with accompaniment of his son Stevan Ognenovski on drum Tale Ognenovski recorded Mozart's Clarinet Concerto in A major, K. 622 (Clarinet Concerto (Mozart)) This album Mozart and Ognenovski Clarinet Concertos (IR37223, Independent Records, US) released in January 2006 to celebrate the 250th anniversary of the birth of Austrian composer Wolfgang Amadeus Mozart (January 27, 1956 – 2006) includes "Tale Ognenovski Concert for Clarinet No. 1" (clarinet, tin whistle, small bagpipe and zourla (zurla)) already released on Jazz, Macedonian Folk Dances and Classical Music.

He incorporated clarinet as second classical instrument into his arrangements, notably on the Mozart Clarinet Concerto Composed by Mozart. Tale Ognenovski arranged parts of the Mozart's clarinet concerto for two clarinets. In this recording the clarinet is accompanied by drum performed by his son Stevan Ognenovski or by drum and second clarinet (performed by Tale Ognenovski).

Tale Ognenovski performed the Concerto on a standard-range A clarinet (Buffet Crampon) according to Breitkopf & Hartel edition (Publisher's no.: Nr. 2300). Perhaps this is unique recording where every notes of measure numbers III/311-313 from the Third movement: Rondo: Allegro are played by Tale Ognenovski exactly as they are written in Breitkopf & Härtel edition. NME.com feature on Breitkopf & Hartel including YouTube music video: "Tale Ognenovski Mozart Clarinet Concerto in A K.622 III. Rondo Allegro (final movt) as selection from Breitkopf & Härtel, the world's oldest music publishing company. NME.COM is Web site of music magazine NME.

Julia M. Heinen, Professor of Clarinet, California State University, Northridge, United States": ""Based on the recommendation of the wonderful clarinetist, Michele Z. I have to tell you that this is now my most favorite recording of the Mozart Concerto. I can only hope all clarinetists near and far will learn from this unique interpretation. Bravo Mr.Ognenovski, you've set a new standard."; David Gilman, orchestral & solo clarinetist, Lake Forest, California: "I must concur with my colleague, Michele Z., for her astute observations regarding Mr. Ognenovski's artistry. His subtle phrasing and amazing tone leave one breathless. Words cannot adequately describe the impression his recordings make. One must experience them to believe it. I can still hardly believe it myself." Erika Borsos: "This reviewer is familiar with the three B's of classical music: Bach, Beethoven, and Brahms and can distinguish their styles, one can *now* add a fourth "B" which stands for "Balkan" as played by Tale Ognenovski. Mr. Ognenovski plays Mozart with his own inimitable personal style making the classical music take on mysterious and exotic characteristics and overtones... Ognenovski explodes with passion as he performs his own "Tale Ognenovski Concerto for Clarinet No. 1" ... The labyrinthine musical pathways he creates are enormously pleasing to the listener. The pentatonic scale and odd metered rhythms of Macedonia awaken the listener to new vistas of musical excitement and enjoyment. Anyone who loves jazz improvisation and the sounds of the clarinet will immediately recognize the superior creativity, breath control and complete mastery of this instrument as played by Mr. Ognenovski..."

Top40-Charts News published an article entitled, "Tale Ognenovski, Internationally Renowned Jazz And Classical Clarinetist Released CD Album Entitled: Mozart And Ognenovski Clarinet Concertos To Celebrate The 250th Anniversary Of Mozart's Birthday"" on November 13, 2006.

Digital album "Mozart Clarinet Concerto in A, K. 622 Arranged for Two Clarinets by Tale Ognenovski" (Record label: Independent Records, US. Catalog: IR43832) was released On April 27, 2016, at Amazon.com Mi2n Music Industry News Network published an article entitled, "New Digital Album Of Clarinetist And Composer Tale Ognenovski: "Mozart Clarinet Concerto In A, K. 622 Arranged For Two Clarinets By Tale Ognenovski""on April 27, 2017, the 95th birth anniversary of Tale Ognenovski April 27, 1922

Stevan Ognenovski, the only son of clarinetist and composer Tale Ognenovski and Nevena Ognenovska, on the base of recording of "Mozart Clarinet Concerto in A Major, K.622" from 2005, arranged in 2015 nine new tracks with two clarinets, first clarinet and second clarinet performed by Tale Ognenovski. In this recording Tale Ognenovski performed with first, second and two clarinets. Tale Ognenovski performed on a standard-range A clarinet, Buffet Crampon, System Boehm, Model No. 1.

Perhaps this is unique recording when clarinetist (Tale Ognenovski) used two clarinets simultaneously with two different arrangements. In other words: used two clarinets by a single performer (Tale Ognenovski) - Playing the first clarinet with first arrangement and second clarinet with second arrangement that's played simultaneously – by one performer (Tale Ognenovski). In reality these three tracks: "Mozart Clarinet Concerto in A, K. 622 Allegro Arranged for Two Clarinets by Tale Ognenovski"; "Mozart Clarinet Concerto in A, K. 622 Adagio Arranged for Two Clarinets by Tale Ognenovski" and "Mozart Clarinet Concerto in A, K. 622 Rondo Allegro Arranged for Two Clarinets by Tale Ognenovski" were made by mixing one audio recording with clarinet performance according to the arrangement for first clarinet (performed by Tale Ognenovski) and separate audio recording (performed by Tale Ognenovski) with clarinet performance according to the arrangement for second clarinet. It was possible to make a mix of two audio recording with arrangements for the first and second clarinet (performed by Tale Ognenovski) thanks to the excellent synchronization of performance of the arrangement for the second clarinet by clarinetist Tale Ognenovski while he simultaneously listening to the tape of his performance on the clarinet with the arrangement for the first clarinet. Top40-Charts News published an article entitled, "Mozart and Ognenovski Is the Best Clarinet Concertos in the World" on November 21, 2014.

=== Macedonian Jazz ===
In September 2008, Tale Ognenovski Quartet released his second CD album: Macedonian Clarinet Jazz Composed by Tale Ognenovski (IR38824, Independent Records, US) with twelve tracks: Tale Ognenovski Jazz Composition No 1, 2, 3, 4, 5, 6, 7, 8, 9, 10, 11 and 12, all composed by Tale Ognenovski.

All About Jazz published article entitled: "New CD 'Macedonian Clarinet Jazz Composed By Tale Ognenovski' of Internationally Renowned Jazz, Folk Dance And Classical Clarinetist" on September 27, 2008, at his website.

== Influence ==
=== Contributions to the music world ===
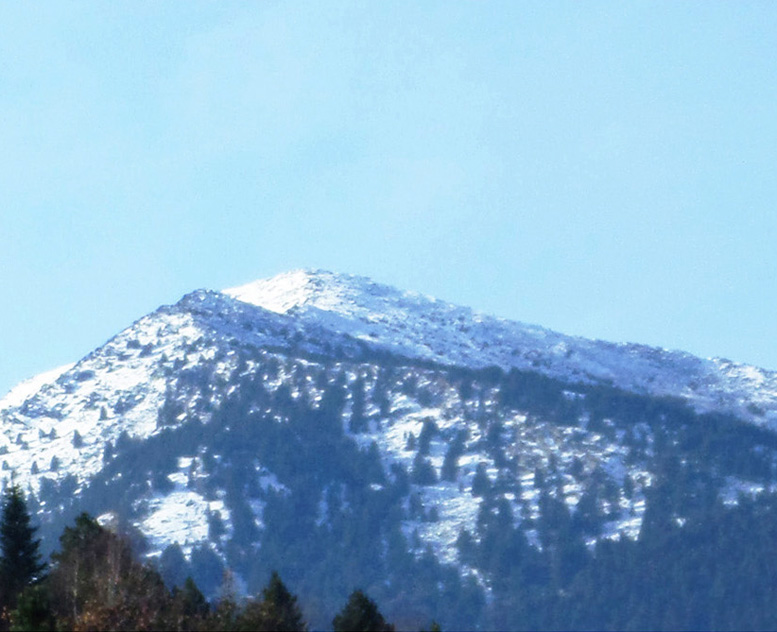
Baba Mountain with its peak Pelister (2,601 metres) in the backdrop. View from the house of Tale Ognenovski, Peak Pelister was inspiration for Tale Ognenovski for composing his instrumental composition "Pelistersko oro" in 1963.

Contributions of Tale Ognenovski to the music world were explained in the book entitled "Rough Guide to World Music Volume One: Africa, Europe & The Middle East" written by Simon Broughton and Mark Ellingham. In this book on page 203 was written: ""One of the few clarinettists to have performed successfully both with a calgia and in the more modern style is Tale Ognenovski, born in 1922 and one of the most influential musicians of the post-war era. He was a member of the Tanec group during the 1950s and lead clarinet of the Radio Skopje calgia. The composer of many tunes that have become standards, he is today the leader of his own group, and a master of the more Westernised style that become prominent in the 1940s and 50s. This is the style that still holds sway, and which is the basis for Macedonia's own new composed folk music.""

Music composed by Tale Ognenovski is performing by instrumentalists and bands, including: Vlatko Stefanovski, Damir Imeri, Ensemble "Tanec" (Pelistersko Oro); Ljubisa Pavkovic (Pelistersko Oro); Aritmija (Piperkovo Oro); AKUD "Sonja Marinković" (Pelistersko Oro); Dragianni, Damjan Pejcinoski, Muris Varajic (Pelistersko Oro); Muris Varajic & Dragianni (Piperkovo Oro) and Andrej Zupan (Pelistersko Oro and Piperkovo Oro).

Ognenovski is an influence on musicians including Zoran Madzirov, Pachora, and New York bands interpreting Balkan music. "Though Douglas' primary interest is exploring a wide range of musics with his friends...Most importantly, he has developed several parallel strands in his work through several ongoing ensembles, ranging from Tiny Bell Trio, the vanguard unit of the recent Balkan music boomlet... As a result, Douglas has the best of parallel worlds... Recalling the spree sparked a lively discussion about clarinetist Tale Ognenovski, which segued to the proliferation of New York bands interpreting Balkan music (Shepik is the linchpin of the movement, leading his own group, The Commuters, and playing with both Matt Darriau's Paradox Trio and with Black and Speed, in Pachora)." wrote JazzTimes music critic Bill Shoemaker in an article entitled "Dave Douglas: Parallel Worlds", appearing in the website of JazzTimes on January 3, 1998. Jazzclub Unterfahrt from Munich, Bavaria, Germany commented: "Playing the music of clarinetist Tale Ognenovski is different from imitating Michael Breckers style."

"Pelistersko oro" and "Piperkovo oro" composed and arranged by Tale Ognenovski and "Nevestinsko oro" arranged by Tale Ognenovski were included in the music project entitled "MAKEDONISSIMO" arranged by composer Pande Shahov in collaboration with Simon Trpčeski. Virtuoso pianist Simon Trpčeski performed this music project "MAKEDONISSIMO""- Transcriptions of Macedonian traditional music at Ludwigsburg Schossfestspiele, Germany on May 18, 2017.

Online Merker – Die international Kulturplatform für Musiktheater, Konzert, Schauspiiel, Literatur, Medien, Ausstellungen in österreich und aller Welt music critic Alexander Walther commented, "Although it is a small country, Macedonia has produced a great wealth of songs and dances. On Thursday evening at the "Makedonia" concert with Simon Trpceski & Band, you could see for yourself ... And the last pigtail in the thirteen-eighth episode was the title of "Pelistersko" by Tale Ognenovski, referring to Pelister, the highest peak of the Baba Mountains." Many articles about artistic works of Tale Ognenovski and his biography have been written in the books, newspapers, web sites and TV programs.

== Jazz Musician of the Day ==
All About Jazz celebrated April 27, 2009, the birthday of Tale Ognenovski with All About Jazz recognition: Jazz Musician of the Day: Tale Ognenovski.

== Personal life ==
Tale and Nevena (1922–1971) married in 1947. They had two children, the son Stevan and the daughter Mica. Nevena was the main source of his strength and motivation and she supported his music career.

Tale Ognenovski died in Skopje on June 19, 2012.

The book, "Tale Ognenovski Virtuoso of the Clarinet and Composer" Photo right Dedication written in the first page of this book. Tale Ognenovski wrote, "This book is a gift to my son Stevan Ognenovski, my daughter in law Margarita and grandchildren Nikola and Kliment. With kind regards, Tale Ognenovski, December 4, 2001

== Other awards and honours ==
- Yugoslavian Stage Award, the greatest award in former Yugoslavia for musical stage artists, from the Association of Stage Artists of Yugoslavia, Zagreb, Croatia, October 31, 1978
- Macedonian Stage Award with Honours, the greatest award in the Republic of Macedonia for musical stage artists, from the Association of Stage Artists of Macedonia, Skopje, Republic of Macedonia, May 27, 1996
- Lifetime Achievement Award, "The Ten Folk Pearls", sponsored by Macedonian Radio Television, February 19, 2002, Skopje, Republic of Macedonia.
- Radio Ros Award, December 7, 2000, Skopje, Republic of Macedonia
- Tale Ognenovski, received Certificate for "National Pension" from Nikola Gruevski, Prime Minister of Republic of Macedonia in the "Museum of the Macedonian Struggle", Skopje, Republic of Macedonia on March 3, 2012, for his contributions to Macedonian culture.
- Tale Ognenovski, received "Gratitude" from the "Macedonian National Ensemble for Folk Dances and Songs "Tanec"" for his special contribution to the Ensemble "Tanec" and to Macedonian culture on October 30, 2014. Tale Ognenovski's son Stevan Ognenovski, received Gratitude" from Zoran Dzorlev, Director of the Ensemble "Tanec" at the ceremony in the "Museum of the Macedonian Struggle", Skopje, Republic of Macedonia.
- Order of Merits for the People with Silver Rays (Macedonian: Орден на заслуги за народот со сребрена звезда) by Ordinance from Josip Broz Tito, President of the Federal People's Republic of Yugoslavia, 1963 for organizing and strengthening the national defense, security and independence of the country and its participation in the People's Liberation War of Macedonia and Yugoslavia in the Second World War (1941 - 1945).
- Order of Brotherhood and Unity with Silver Wreath, Ordinance number 141 from Josip Broz Tito, President of the Socialist Federal Republic of Yugoslavia, 25.11.1966, Belgrade, Yugoslavia (Macedonian: Орден за братство и единство со сребрен венец ", Уредба број 141 од Јосип Броз Тито, претседател на Социјалистичка Федеративна Република Југославија, 25.11.1966, Белград, Југославија)
- "Diploma for a highly qualified musician" from the Association of musicians of folk and entertaining music from Macedonia (signed by the composer Stefan Gajdov), on September 3, 1961, in Skopje, Republic of Macedonia.
- "Spomen plaketa" ("Recognition") from the Parliament of the town of Skopje (signed by Blagoj Popov), in Skopje, Republic of Macedonia on January 20, 1969.
- "Spomenica" ("Recognition") from the Macedonian State Ensemble of Folk dances and Songs 'Tanec' (signed by Toma Leov), in Skopje, Republic of Macedonia on January 31, 1969.
- "Blagodarnica" ("Gratitude") from the Cultural Artists Association 'Kocho Racin' (signed by Blazhe Sekulovski), in Skopje, Republic of Macedonia on June 3, 1971.
- "Spomen plaketa" ("Recognition") from the Cultural House 'Kocho Racin' (signed by Petar Bogatinovski and Stanimir Andreevski), in Skopje, Republic of Macedonia on November 27, 1974.
- "Priznanie" ("Recognition") from the Cultural Education Union of Skopje (signed by Dr. Tome Sazdov), in Skopje, Republic of Macedonia on December 5, 1975.
- "Diploma" (Diploma) from the Association of Stage Artists of Macedonia (signed by Boris Nizamovski), in Skopje, Republic of Macedonia in 1977.
- "Blagodarnica" ("Gratitude") from the Institute of Folklore "Marko Cepenkov", in Skopje, Republic of Macedonia on October 2, 1980.
- "Plaketa - The July 4th" (("Recognition") in former Yugoslavia) for his musical works, from "Sojuz na borci na Jugoslavija", in Belgrade, Yugoslavia on July 4, 1983.
- "Pofalnica" ("Recognition") from "Dom na VVI i borci od NOV-Skopje" and the Committee of the "Borec" Choir on the 10th anniversary of its founding (signed by Branko Ichokjaev and Ljubica Ivanovska), in Skopje, Republic of Macedonia in 1984.
- "Estradna nagrada na Makedonija" ("Macedonian Stage Award") from the Association of Stage Artists of Macedonia (signed by Dragan Mijalkovski), in Skopje, Republic of Macedonia on May 15, 1985.
- "Blagodarnica" ("Gratitude") from the Committee for the celebration on the 600th anniversary of the founding of the village of Brusnik (signed by Cane Skerlevski), in Brusnik, Bitola, Republic of Macedonia on August 8–9, 1992.
- All About Jazz celebrated April 27, 2009, the birthday of Tale Ognenovski with All About Jazz recognition: Jazz Musician of the Day: Tale Ognenovski, with announcement published at his website.

== Reception ==
"Tale Ognenovski uses the most intricate Western playing techniques and combines them with exotic Balkan stylizations creating a pure and genuine new dimensional sound."

In his book, For Our Music Dushko Dimitrovski writes: "The impossible becomes possible: two usually non-complimentary parallel-existing worlds of sounds, Europe and The Orient, are in Tale Ognenovski's music naturally brought closer together, understand each other and merge."

Craig Harris at Allmusic noted, "The only professional folklore ensemble in Macedonia, the Tanec Ensemble are dedicated to the preservation of traditional Macedonian music, dance, and costuming. Founded by the government of the People's Republic of Macedonia in 1949, the group has shared their musical heritage with audiences around the world for more than half a century, performing an estimated 3,500 concerts in 31 countries...The ensemble reached their peak during the late '50s, when influential clarinet and pipes player Tale Ognenovski was a member."

After the end of the tour the Life commented: "A hundred years ago on the rugged roads of Macedonia, bands of brigands used to plunder the caravans of rich merchants and, like Robin Hood, pass on some of their spoils to the poor...this spring, the Yugoslav National Folk Ballet is making a first, and highly successful tour of the U.S...Together they make as vigorous a display of dancing as the U.S. has ever seen."

"Tanec means dance – including drama, song, and music – and that's what the company of some 40 members (who are interchangeably dancers, singers, and musicians)" Margaret Lloyd, dance critic of The Christian Science Monitor

Tale Ognenovski was included in the book entitled: "The Greatest Clarinet Players of All Time: Top 100" written by Alex Trost (Author) and Vadim Kravetsky (Author). Top40-Charts News published an article entitled, "Mozart And Ognenovski Is The Best Clarinet Concertos In The World" on November 21, 2014. Mi2n Music Industry News Network published an article entitled, "Clarinetist Tale Ognenovski Is Included In The Book Entitled "The Greatest Clarinet Players Of All Time: Top 100"" By Alex Trost And Vadim Kravetsky, Publisher: CreateSpace" on November 21, 2014.

== Discography ==
- Makedonska Ora (1963, EP 14700, PGP-RTB, Serbia)
- Makedonska Ora (1964, EP 14702, PGP-RTB, Serbia)
- Makedonska Ora (1964, EP 14703, PGP-RTB, Serbia)
- Makedonska Ora (1964, EP 14704, PGP-RTB, Serbia)
- Tale Ognenovski Klarinet sa Svojim Ansamblom (1965, EP 14711, PGP-RTB, Serbia)
- Narodni Ora Tale Ognenovski so Chalgiite (1965, EP 14716, PGP-RTB, Serbia)
- Makedonska Ora Svira na Klarineti Tale Ognenovski uz Svoj Ansambl (1967, EPY-3851, Jugoton, Croatia)
- Bitola, Babam Bitola, Makedonske Narodne Pjesme i Kola (1969, LPY-V 780, Jugoton, Croatia)
- Plesovi Naroda Jugoslavije (1971, LPYV-S-806, Jugoton, Croatia)
- Makedonska Ora Tale Ognenovski Klarinet sa Svojim Ansamblom (1972, EPY-34461, Jugoton, Croatia)
- Makedonska Narodna Ora (1972, LPY-50985, Jugoton, Croatia)
- Makedonska Ora Svira Ansambl Chalgija pod Vodstvom Tale Ognenovskim (1972, EPY-34489, Jugoton, Croatia)
- Tale Ognenovski Klarinet Svira Ora (1975, LPY-61143, Jugoton, Croatia)
- Tale Ognenovski Kavadarsko Svadbarsko Oro (1977, EP 14758, PGP-RTB, Serbia)
- Makedonski Narodni Ora so Chalgiite na Tale Ognenovski, Staro Kukushko Oro (1979, LP 1495 Stereo, PGP-RTB, Serbia)
- Makedonski Igraorni Ora Sviri Tale Ognenovski (1979, LP 1439 Stereo, PGP-RTB, Serbia)
- 35 Godini na RTV Skopje, Narodna Muzika (1979, ULS-578, Macedonian Radio-Television, Republic of Macedonia)
- Tale Ognenovski so Orkestarot Chalgii na RTS (1989, MP 21037 Stereo, Macedonian Radio-Television, Republic of Macedonia)
- 50 Godini na Makedonskata Radio Televizija, Antologija na Makedonskata Narodna Muzika, Svirachi Majstori (1994, MP 21176 Stereo, Macedonian Radio-Television, Republic of Macedonia)
- Muzichki Spomenar (1994, Video Tape MP31087 VHS PAL Colour, Macedonian Radio-Television, Republic of Macedonia)
- Jazz, Macedonian Folk Dances and Classical Music (2001, IR04542, Independent Records, US)
- Mozart and Ognenovski Clarinet Concertos (2006, IR37223, Independent Records, US)
- Macedonian Clarinet Jazz Composed By Tale Ognenovski (2008, IR38824, Independent Records, US)
- Mozart Clarinet Concerto in A, K. 622 Arranged for Two Clarinets by Tale Ognenovski (2016, IR43832, Independent Records, US)

== Books about Tale Ognenovski ==
- TALE OGNENOVSKI VIRTUOSO OF THE CLARINET AND COMPOSER (2001) Stevan Ognenovski
- TALE OGNENOVSKI VIRTUOSO OF THE CLARINET AND COMPOSER, BIOGRAPHY AND MUSIC NOTATION OF 69 CLARINET COMPOSITIONS: MACEDONIAN FOLK DANCES, JAZZ AND CLASSICAL MUSIC (2019) Stevan Ognenovski
- "Macedonian dances" (Macedonian: "МАКЕДОНСКИ ОРА" - Tale Ognenovski is author of the book "Macedonian dances" (Macedonian: "МАКЕДОНСКИ ОРА")/ "Makedonski ora") published by the Cultural Educational Association, Skopje, Republic of Macedonia in 1989. The book content music notation of 68 clarinet compositions: MACEDONIAN DANCES, all composed or arranged by Tale Ognenovski
