= List of instrumental compositions composed or arranged and recorded by Tale Ognenovski =

The following is a table of instrumental compositions composed or arranged and recorded by Tale Ognenovski:

- The column Year lists the year in which the instrumental composition was first recorded.
- The column Instrumental composition lists the instrumental composition title.
- The column Composer(s) lists who composed the instrumental composition.
- The column Arranger(s) lists who arranged the instrumental composition.
- The column Date, Album, Record label lists the date of recording, title of the album, catalog of the record label.
- Tale Ognenovski has composed or arranged 300 instrumental compositions: Macedonian folk dances, jazz compositions, and classical concerts

Labels: MRT, Macedonian Radio-Television, Republic of Macedonia PGP-RTB, now PGP-RTS Radio Television of Serbia, Serbia Jugoton, now Croatia Records, Croatia IR, Independent Records, USA

== Studio recordings ==
Year	Instrumental composition	Composer(s)	Arranger(s)	Date, Album, Record label
1984	"Babunsko Talevo oro" (or "Babunsko oro" or "Talevo Babunsko oro")	Tale Ognenovski	Tale Ognenovski	02.11.1984, Magnetic tape MRT LN. 5102/I
1984	"Talevo Badnikovo oro" (or "Badnikovo oro")	Tale Ognenovski	Tale Ognenovski	06.01.1984, Magnetic tape MRT LN. 4901/II
1984	"Bairsko oro"	Tale Ognenovski	Tale Ognenovski	23.10.1984, Magnetic tape MRT LN. 5093/I
1985	"Berovsko zhensko oro"	Tale Ognenovski	Tale Ognenovski	11.01.1985, Magnetic tape MRT LN. 5197/II
1984	"Bistrichko oro" (or "Bitolsko Bistrichko oro")	Tale Ognenovski	Tale Ognenovski	23.10.1984, Magnetic tape MRT LN. 5093/III
1963	"Bitolsko oro" (or "Bitolsko oro I")	Tale Ognenovski	Tale Ognenovski	28.02.1984, Magnetic tape MRT LN. 4951/II; Magnetic tape MRT LN. 299/I; Magnetic tape MRT LN. 219/I; 1963, Gramophone record "MAKEDONSKA ORA - MACEDONIAN FOLK DANCES" PGP RTB EP 14700
1983	"Talevo Bitolsko oro" (or "Bitolsko oro II")	Tale Ognenovski	Tale Ognenovski	21.01.1983, Magnetic tape MRT LN. 2413/II
1982	"Bitolsko za ramo oro" (or "Bitolsko oro za ramo" or "Za ramo Bitolsko oro")	Tale Ognenovski	Tale Ognenovski	26.10.1982, Magnetic tape MRT LN. 4507/II; 1989, Cassette MRT MP 21037 STEREO
N/A	"Bitolsko mashko oro"	Tale Ognenovski	Tale Ognenovski	Magnetic tape MRT LN. 4507/II
1963	"Bitolsko svadbarsko oro"	Tale Ognenovski	Tale Ognenovski	Magnetic tape MRT LN. 2401/I; Magnetic tape MRT LN. 7973; 28.06.1983, Magnetic tape MRT LN. 2413; 28.06.1983, Magnetic tape MRT LN. 4776; 1963, Gramophone record "MAKEDONSKA ORA - MACEDONIAN FOLK DANCES" PGP RTB EP 14700
1983	"Bogomilsko oro"	Tale Ognenovski	Tale Ognenovski	30.12.1983, Magnetic tape MRT LN. 4900/I
N/A	"Brusnichko potpelistersko oro" (or "Brusnichko oro I")	Tale Ognenovski	Tale Ognenovski	Magnetic tape MRT LN. 4849/II
1983	"Brusnichko mladinsko oro" (or "Brusnichko oro II")	Tale Ognenovski	Tale Ognenovski	27.12.1983, Magnetic tape MRT LN. 4897; Magnetic tape MRT LN. 3897/II; 1989, Cassette MRT MP 21037 STEREO
1983	"Brusnichko padinsko oro" (or "Brusnichko oro III")	Tale Ognenovski	Tale Ognenovski	07.10.1983, Magnetic tape MRT LN. 4849/II
1964	"Brusnichko oro" (or "Brusnichko oro IV")	Tale Ognenovski	Tale Ognenovski	Magnetic tape MRT LN. 1879/III; Magnetic tape MRT LN. 1560/I; 1964, Gramophone record "MAKEDONSKA ORA - MACEDONIAN FOLK DANCES" PGP RTB EP 14703; 1979, Gramophone LP (Long Play) record "Makedonski igraorni ora sviri Tale Ognenovski" PGP RTB LP1439 STEREO and Cassette PGP RTB NK10280; 2001, CD: "Jazz, Macedonian Folk Dances and Classical Music", Catalog: IR 04542
1967	"Bukovsko svadbarsko oro" (or "Bukovsko oro I")	Tale Ognenovski	Tale Ognenovski	Magnetic tape MRT LN. 2073/I; Magnetic tape MRT LN. 932/I; 10.01.1984, Magnetic tape MRT LN. 4903/I; 1967, Gramophone record "Makedonska ora svira na klarineti Tale Ognenovski" Jugoton EPY-3851; 1969, Gramophone LP (Long Play) record "BITOLA, BABAM BITOLA" Jugoton LPY-V 780 and cassette Jugoton CAY-157; 1974, Gramophone LP (Long Play) record "TALE OGNENOVSKI klarinet svira ora" Jugoton LPY-61143 and Cassette Jugoton CAY 321; 2001, CD: "Jazz, Macedonian Folk Dances and Classical Music", Catalog: IR 04542
1964	"Bitolsko Bukovsko oro" (or "Bukovsko oro II" or "Bukovsko oro")	Tale Ognenovski	Tale Ognenovski	22.11.1966, Magnetic tape MRT LN. 7968/I; Magnetic tape MRT LN. 4026; Magnetic tape MRT LN. 5109/I; 1964, Gramophone record "MAKEDONSKA ORA - MACEDONIAN FOLK DANCES" PGP RTB EP 14702
1975	"Veleshko veselo oro" (or "Veleshko oro")	Tale Ognenovski	Tale Ognenovski	07.01.1975, Magnetic tape MRT LN. 1945; Magnetic tape MRT LN. 3496/I; Magnetic tape MRT LN. 7968/I
1983	"Gevgelisko oro"	Tale Ognenovski	Tale Ognenovski	30.12.1983, Magnetic tape MRT LN. 4900/II
1981	"Germijansko oro"	Tale Ognenovski	Tale Ognenovski	20.03.1981, Magnetic tape MRT LN. 4108; 23.11.1982, Magnetic tape MRT LN. 4531; Magnetic tape MRT LN. 4180/II; Magnetic tape MRT LN. 28/III; 1989, Cassette "TALE OGNENOVSKI SO ORKESTAROT CHALGII NA RADIO TELEVIZIJA SKOPJE" MRT MP 21037 STEREO
1962	"Deverovo oro"	Tale Ognenovski	Tale Ognenovski	1962, Magnetic tape MRT LN. 5329/III; 1965, Gramophone record "TALE OGNENOVSKI KLARINET SO CHALGIITE" PGP RTB EP 14711
1965	"Dihovsko oro"	Tale Ognenovski	Tale Ognenovski	Magnetic tape MRT LN. 2058/II; 22.10.1982, Magnetic tape MRT LN. 4505; 1965, Gramophone record "TALE OGNENOVSKI KLARINET SO CHALGIITE" PGP RTB EP 14711
1984	"Zetovsko oro"	Tale Ognenovski	Tale Ognenovski	26.10.1984, Magnetic tape MRT LN. 5099/I; Magnetic tape MRT LN. 6627/IV
1972	"Kasapsko oro"	Macedonian folk dance	Tale Ognenovski	Magnetic tape MRT LN. 1298/I; 28.09.1982, Magnetic tape MRT LN. 4606; Magnetic tape MRT LN. 4838; 1972, Gramophone record "Makedonska ora svira ANSAMBL CHALGIJA pod vodstvom TALE OGNENOVSKIM," Jugoton EPY-34489; 1975, Gramophone LP (Long Play) record "TALE OGNENOVSKI klarinet svira ora" Jugoton LPY-61143 and Cassette Jugoton CAY 321; 1977, Jugoton LPY-61294 and Jugoton CAY 381; 1994, Cassette "ANTOLOGIJA NA MAKEDONSKATA NARODNA MUZIKA - ANTHOLOGY OF MACEDONIAN FOLK MUSIC" MRT MP 21176 STEREO
N/A	"Krstorsko oro"	Tale Ognenovski	Tale Ognenovski	Magnetic tape MRT LN. 5634/I
1975	"Kumovo oro chochek"	Tale Ognenovski	Tale Ognenovski	Magnetic tape MRT LN. 1451/IV; Gramophone record "Makedonska ora svira TALE OGNENOVSKI klarinet sa svojim ansamblom" Jugoton EPY-34461; 1975, Gramophone LP (Long Play) record "TALE OGNENOVSKI klarinet svira ora" Jugoton LPY-61143 and Cassette Jugoton CAY 321
1983	"Lavchansko za ramo oro"	Tale Ognenovski	Tale Ognenovski	27.12.1983, Magnetic tape MRT LN. 4897/I
1975	"Nevenino oro"	Tale Ognenovski	Tale Ognenovski	31.01.1984, Magnetic tape MRT LN. 4904/II; 1967, Gramophone record "Makedonska ora svira na klarineti Tale Ognenovski" Jugoton EPY-3851; 1975, Gramophone LP (Long Play) record "TALE OGNENOVSKI klarinet svira ora" Jugoton LPY-61143 and Cassette Jugoton CAY 321; 2001, CD: "Jazz, Macedonian Folk Dances and Classical Music", Catalog: IR 04542
1979	"Pajdushko svadbarsko oro" (or "Pajdushko (svadbarsko) oro I" or "Pajdushkata oro"	Tale Ognenovski	Tale Ognenovski	Magnetic tape MRT LN. 2400/I; Magnetic tape MRT LN. 7226/II; 1979, Gramophone LP (Long Play) record "Makedonski igraorni ora sviri Tale Ognenovski" PGP RTB LP1439 and cassette PGP RTB NK 10280
1984	"Potpelisterski rasadnik oro" (or "Pajdushko (Talevo) oro II" or "Talevo Pajdushko oro"	Tale Ognenovski	Tale Ognenovski	02.11.1984, Magnetic tape MRT LN. 5102/II; Magnetic tape MRT LN. 2413
N/A	"Palanechko veselo oro" (or "Pajdushko oro III")	Tale Ognenovski	Tale Ognenovski	Magnetic tape MRT LN. 5729/I
1973	"Pelagonisko oro"	Tale Ognenovski	Tale Ognenovski	Magnetic tape MRT LN. 4578/I; 1973, Magnetic tape MRT LN. 1428/I; 04.12.1982, Magnetic tape MRT LN. 4558
1963	"Pelistersko oro" (or "Peristersko oro")	Tale Ognenovski	Tale Ognenovski	Magnetic tape MRT LN. 2401/III; Magnetic tape MRT LN. 3691/III; Magnetic tape MRT LN. 1514/IV; Magnetic tape MRT LN. 7975; 29.12.1983, Magnetic tape MRT LN. 4898; 1963, Gramophone record "MAKEDONSKA ORA - MACEDONIAN FOLK DANCES" PGP RTB EP 14700
1979	"Piperkovo oro"	Tale Ognenovski	Tale Ognenovski	Magnetic tape MRT LN. 2401/II; Magnetic tape MRT LN. 7972; 29.12.1983, Magnetic tape MRT LN. 4898; 1979, Gramophone LP (Long Play) record "Makedonski igraorni ora sviri Tale Ognenovski" PGP RTB LP1439 STEREO and Cassette PGP RTB NK10280
1971	"Oro Poziv dojde" (or "Poziv dojde oro")	Tale Ognenovski	Tale Ognenovski	03.12.1971, Magnetic tape MRT LN. 1288/I; 04.12.1982, Magnetic tape MRT LN. 4558/II; 1989, Cassette "TALE OGNENOVSKI SO ORKESTAROT CHALGII NA RADIO TELEVIZIJA SKOPJE" MRT MP 21037 STEREO
1967	"Poljansko oro"	Tale Ognenovski	Tale Ognenovski	10.01.1984, Magnetic tape MRT LN. 4903/II; Magnetic tape MRT LN. 932/II; 1967, Gramophone record "Makedonska ora svira na klarineti Tale Ognenovski" Jugoton EPY-3851; 1975, Gramophone LP (Long Play) record "TALE OGNENOVSKI klarinet svira ora" Jugoton LPY-61143 and Cassette Jugoton CAY 321
1965	"Prespansko oro"	Tale Ognenovski	Tale Ognenovski	Magnetic tape MRT LN. 1298/III; 28.09.1982, Magnetic tape MRT LN. 4606; 1965, Gramophone record "TALE OGNENOVSKI KLARINET SO CHALGIITE" PGP RTB EP 14711; 1989, Cassette "TALE OGNENOVSKI SO ORKESTAROT CHALGII NA RADIO TELEVIZIJA SKOPJE" MRT MP 21037 STEREO
1964	"Talevo svadbarsko oro" (or "Svadbarsko (Talevo) oro" or "Taletovo svadbarsko oro"	Tale Ognenovski	Tale Ognenovski	28.02.1984, Magnetic tape MRT LN. 4951/I; Magnetic tape MRT LN. 1514/III; 1964, Gramophone record "MAKEDONSKA ORA - MACEDONIAN FOLK DANCES" PGP RTB EP 14703; 1979, Gramophone LP (Long Play) record "Makedonski igraorni ora sviri Tale Ognenovski" PGP RTB LP1439 STEREO and Cassette PGP RTB NK10280
1983	"Skopsko zhensko oro"	Tale Ognenovski	Tale Ognenovski	Magnetic tape MRT LN. 4801/I; 09.11.1983, Magnetic tape MRT LN. 4861; 1989, Cassette "TALE OGNENOVSKI SO ORKESTAROT CHALGII NA RADIO TELEVIZIJA SKOPJE" MRT MP 21037 STEREO
N/A	"Skopsko mashko oro"	Tale Ognenovski	Tale Ognenovski	Magnetic tape MRT LN. 4901/I
1981	"Skudrinsko oro"	Tale Ognenovski	Tale Ognenovski	20.03.1981, Magnetic tape MRT LN. 4180/I; 1989, Cassette "TALE OGNENOVSKI SO ORKESTAROT CHALGII NA RADIO TELEVIZIJA SKOPJE" MRT MP 21037 STEREO
1982	"Staro komitsko oro"	Macedonian folk dance	Tale Ognenovski	22.10.1982, Magnetic tape MRT LN. 4505/II
1972	"Prilepsko svadbarsko oro" (or "Talevo Prilepsko oro")	Tale Ognenovski	Tale Ognenovski	19.10.1984, Magnetic tape MRT LN. 5103; 1972, Gramophone record "Makedonska ora svira TALE OGNENOVSKI klarinet sa svojim ansamblom" Jugoton EPY-34461; 1975, Gramophone LP (Long Play) record "TALE OGNENOVSKI klarinet svira ora" Jugoton LPY-61143 and Cassette Jugoton CAY 321
1977	"Stevchevo Brusnichko oro" (or "Stevchevo oro")	Tale Ognenovski	Tale Ognenovski	27.03.1984, Magnetic tape MRT LN. 4960/II; 1977, Gramophone record "TALE OGNENOVSKI with his own TALE OGNENOVSKI 'CHALGII' ORCHESTRA" PGP RTB EP 14758; 2001, CD: "Jazz, Macedonian Folk Dances and Classical Music" Catalog: IR 04542
1983	"Skopski vesel chochek" (or "Topaanski chochek oro" or "Vesel Skopski chochek")	Tale Ognenovski	Tale Ognenovski	09.11.1983, Magnetic tape MRT LN. 4861/II; 1989, Cassette "TALE OGNENOVSKI SO ORKESTAROT CHALGII NA RADIO TELEVIZIJA SKOPJE" MRT MP 21037 STEREO
N/A	"Trnovsko oro"	Tale Ognenovski	Tale Ognenovski	Magnetic tape MRT LN. 4524/
1962	"Caparsko oro"	Tale Ognenovski	Tale Ognenovski	28.07.1962, Magnetic tape MRT LN. 4026; 09.03.1981, Magnetic tape MRT LN. 4239/I; 1979, Gramophone LP (Long Play) record "Makedonski igraorni ora sviri Tale Ognenovski" PGP RTB LP1439 STEREO and Cassette PGP RTB NK10280
1979	"Staroto oro"	Tale Ognenovski	Tale Ognenovski	1979, Gramophone LP (Long Play) record "Makedonski igraorni ora sviri Tale Ognenovski" PGP RTB LP1439 STEREO and Cassette PGP RTB NK1028
1979	"Zhensko Kichevsko oro"	Tale Ognenovski	Tale Ognenovski	1979, Gramophone LP (Long Play) record "Makedonski igraorni ora sviri Tale Ognenovski" PGP RTB LP1439 STEREO and Cassette PGP RTB NK10280
1967	"Oroto Pileto mi pee"	Macedonian folk dance	Tale Ognenovski	1967, Magnetic tape MRT LN. 85/II; 1979, Gramophone LP (Long Play) record "Makedonski igraorni ora sviri Tale Ognenovski" PGP RTB LP1439 STEREO and Cassette PGP RTB NK10280
1979	"Kavadarsko oro" (or "Kavadarechko oro")	Macedonian folk dance	Tale Ognenovski	29.10.1982, Magnetic tape MRT LN. 4508; 1979, Gramophone LP (Long Play) record "Makedonski igraorni ora sviri Tale Ognenovski" PGP RTB LP1439 STEREO and Cassette PGP RTB NK10280
1979	"Skopski chochek"	Tale Ognenovski	Tale Ognenovski	1979, Gramophone LP (Long Play) record "Makedonski igraorni ora sviri Tale Ognenovski" PGP RTB LP1439 STEREO and Cassette PGP RTB NK10280
1976	"Starsko za ramo"	Tale Ognenovski	Tale Ognenovski	07.12.1976, Magnetic tape MRT LN. 2617/III;1979, Gramophone LP (Long Play) record "Makedonski igraorni ora sviri Tale Ognenovski" PGP RTB LP1439 STEREO and Cassette PGP RTB NK10280
1964	"Oroto Adana"	Macedonian folk dance	Tale Ognenovski	1964, Gramophone record "MAKEDONSKA ORA" PGP RTB EP 14704; 1979, Gramophone LP (Long Play) record "Makedonski igraorni ora sviri Tale Ognenovski" PGP RTB LP1439 STEREO and Cassette PGP RTB NK10280; 1972, Gramophone LP (Long Play) record PGP RTB LP 1210 and PGP RTB LP 1211 STEREO and Cassettes PGP RTB NK 10018 and Cassettes PGP RTB NK 10027
1972	"Chamiko oro"	Tale Ognenovski	Tale Ognenovski	1972, Gramophone record "Makedonska ora svira ANSAMBL CHALGIJA pod vodstvom TALE OGNENOVSKIM" Jugoton EPY-34489; 1975, Gramophone LP (Long Play) record "TALE OGNENOVSKI klarinet svira ora" Jugoton LPY-61143 and Cassette Jugoton CAY 321
1972	"Egejsko oro"	Tale Ognenovski	Tale Ognenovski	23.09.1983, Magnetic tape MRT LN. 4839; 1972, Gramophone record "Makedonska ora svira TALE OGNENOVSKI klarinet sa svojim ansamblom" Jugoton EPY-34461; 1975, Gramophone LP (Long Play) record "TALE OGNENOVSKI klarinet svira ora" Jugoton LPY-61143 and Cassette Jugoton CAY 321
1972	"Vlashko oro"	Vlach folk dance	Tale Ognenovski	1972, Gramophone record "Makedonska ora svira ANSAMBL CHALGIJA pod vodstvom TALE OGNENOVSKIM" Jugoton EPY-34489; 1975, Gramophone LP (Long Play) record "TALE OGNENOVSKI klarinet svira ora" Jugoton LPY-61143 and Cassette Jugoton CAY 321
1967	"Resensko oro"	Tale Ognenovski	Tale Ognenovski	Magnetic tape MRT LN. 28; 09.03.1981, Magnetic tape MRT LN. 4230; Magnetic tape MRT LN. 4939; 31.01.1984, Magnetic tape MRT LN. 4904; Magnetic tape MRT LN. 4239; 1967, Gramophone record "Makedonska ora svira na klarineti Tale Ognenovski" Jugoton EPY-3851; 1971, Gramophone LP (Long Play) record "PLESOVI NARODA JUGOSLAVIJE - YUGOSLAVIAN FOLK DANCES" Jugoton LPYV-S-806 and Cassette Jugoton CAY-12; 1975, Gramophone LP (Long Play) record "TALE OGNENOVSKI klarinet svira ora" Jugoton LPY-61143 and Cassette CAY Jugoton 321
1972	"Patruno svadbeno oro"	Tale Ognenovski	Tale Ognenovski	22.05.1972, Magnetic tape MRT LN. 1451; 1972, Gramophone record "Makedonska ora svira ANSAMBL CHALGIJA pod vodstvom TALE OGNENOVSKIM" Jugoton EPY-34489; 1975, Gramophone LP (Long Play) record "TALE OGNENOVSKI klarinet svira ora" Jugoton LPY-61143 and Cassette Jugoton CAY 321
1972	"Mominsko oro"	Macedonian folk dance	Tale Ognenovski	Magnetic tape MRT LN. 1560/III; 28.06.1983, Magnetic tape MRT LN. 2413; 28.06.1983, Magnetic tape MRT LN. 4776; 1972, Gramophone record "Makedonska ora svira TALE OGNENOVSKI klarinet sa svojim ansamblom" Jugoton EPY-34461; 1975, Gramophone LP (Long Play) record "TALE OGNENOVSKI klarinet svira ora" Jugoton LPY-61143 and Cassette Jugoton CAY 321
1979	"Oroto staro Kukushko"	Macedonian folk dance	Tale Ognenovski	1979 Gramophone LP (Long Play) record ""STARO KUKUSHKO ORO MAKEDONSKI NARODNI ORA SO CHALGIITE NA TALE OGNENOVSKI" PGP RTB LP1495 stereo and Cassette PGP RTB NK 10387
1975	"Shapkarevo kasapsko oro"	Macedonian folk dance	Tale Ognenovski	09.05.1975, Magnetic tape MRT LN. 2044; 1979 Gramophone LP (Long Play) record ""STARO KUKUSHKO ORO MAKEDONSKI NARODNI ORA SO CHALGIITE NA TALE OGNENOVSKI" PGP RTB LP1495 stereo and Cassette PGP RTB NK 10387
1979	"Sechena krshlama"	Macedonian folk dance	Tale Ognenovski	1979, Gramophone LP (Long Play) record ""STARO KUKUSHKO ORO MAKEDONSKI NARODNI ORA SO CHALGIITE NA TALE OGNENOVSKI" PGP RTB LP1495 stereo and Cassette PGP RTB NK 10387
1979	"Ristevo oro"	Macedonian folk dance	Tale Ognenovski	1979, Gramophone LP (Long Play) record ""STARO KUKUSHKO ORO MAKEDONSKI NARODNI ORA SO CHALGIITE NA TALE OGNENOVSKI" PGP RTB LP1495 stereo and Cassette PGP RTB NK 10387
1979	"Harman kjoljisko oro"	Macedonian folk dance	Tale Ognenovski	1979, Gramophone LP (Long Play) record ""STARO KUKUSHKO ORO MAKEDONSKI NARODNI ORA SO CHALGIITE NA TALE OGNENOVSKI" PGP RTB LP1495 stereo and Cassette PGP RTB NK 10387
1975	"Pazjansko oro"	Macedonian folk dance	Tale Ognenovski	05.11.1982, Magnetic tape MRT LN. 4512; 03.09.1975, Magnetic tape MRT LN. 2052; 1979 Gramophone LP (Long Play) record ""STARO KUKUSHKO ORO MAKEDONSKI NARODNI ORA SO CHALGIITE NA TALE OGNENOVSKI" PGP RTB LP1495 stereo and Cassette PGP RTB NK 10387
1975	"Nunkova krshlama"	Macedonian folk dance	Tale Ognenovski	10.06.1975, Magnetic tape MRT LN. 2369; 1979 Gramophone LP (Long Play) record "STARO KUKUSHKO ORO MAKEDONSKI NARODNI ORA SO CHALGIITE NA TALE OGNENOVSKI" PGP RTB LP1495 stereo and Cassette PGP RTB NK 10387
1979	"Zaharievo oro"	Macedonian folk dance	Tale Ognenovski	1979, Gramophone LP (Long Play) record ""STARO KUKUSHKO ORO MAKEDONSKI NARODNI ORA SO CHALGIITE NA TALE OGNENOVSKI" PGP RTB LP1495 stereo and Cassette PGP RTB NK 10387
1979	"Lagadinsko rusalisko oro"	Macedonian folk dance	Tale Ognenovski	1979, Gramophone LP (Long Play) record ""STARO KUKUSHKO ORO MAKEDONSKI NARODNI ORA SO CHALGIITE NA TALE OGNENOVSKI" PGP RTB LP1495 stereo and Cassette PGP RTB NK 10387
1979	"Harman kjojska krshlama"	Macedonian folk dance	Tale Ognenovski	1979, Gramophone LP (Long Play) record ""STARO KUKUSHKO ORO MAKEDONSKI NARODNI ORA SO CHALGIITE NA TALE OGNENOVSKI" PGP RTB LP1495 stereo and Cassette PGP RTB NK 10387
1979	"Ajvatovsko oro"	Macedonian folk dance	Tale Ognenovski	1979, Gramophone LP (Long Play) record ""STARO KUKUSHKO ORO MAKEDONSKI NARODNI ORA SO CHALGIITE NA TALE OGNENOVSKI" PGP RTB LP1495 stereo and Cassette PGP RTB NK 10387
1981	"Ohridsko oro"	Tale Ognenovski	Tale Ognenovski	27.03.1981, Magnetic tape MRT LN. 4178; Magnetic tape MRT LN. 167/III; Magnetic tape MRT LN. 3667/II; 1989, Cassette "TALE OGNENOVSKI SO ORKESTAROT CHALGII NA RADIO TELEVIZIJA SKOPJE" MRT MP 21037 STEREO
1965	"Demirhisarsko zhensko oro"	Tale Ognenovski	Tale Ognenovski	25.11.1966, Magnetic tape MRT LN. 7970/I; 26.10.1982, Magnetic tape MRT LN. 4507; Magnetic tape MRT LN. 1750/I; 1989, Cassette "TALE OGNENOVSKI SO ORKESTAROT CHALGII NA RADIO TELEVIZIJA SKOPJE" MRT MP 21037 STEREO; 1965, Gramophone record "TALE OGNENOVSKI KLARINET SO CHALGIITE" PGP RTB EP 14716
1979	"Veleshko zhensko oro"	Tale Ognenovski	Tale Ognenovski	Magnetic tape MRT LN. 2939; 1979, Gramophone LP (Long Play) record MRT ULS-578 (P 1979) with Orchestra of Radio Television Skopje; 1989, Cassette "TALE OGNENOVSKI SO ORKESTAROT CHALGII NA RADIO TELEVIZIJA SKOPJE" MRT MP 21037 STEREO
1983	"Talevo Brusnichko oro"	Tale Ognenovski	Tale Ognenovski	1989, 21.01.1983, Magnetic tape MRT LN. 2413; 1989, Cassette "TALE OGNENOVSKI SO ORKESTAROT CHALGII NA RADIO TELEVIZIJA SKOPJE" MRT MP 21037 STEREO
1964	"Zhensko krsteno oro"	Tale Ognenovski	Tale Ognenovski	1964, Gramophone record "MAKEDONSKA ORA - MACEDONIAN FOLK DANCES" PGP RTB EP 14704
1965	"Kalamatijana oro"	Macedonian folk dance	Tale Ognenovski	1965, Gramophone record "TALE OGNENOVSKI KLARINET SO CHALGIITE" PGP RTB EP 14716
1965,	"Lamche oro" ("Starsko oro")	Macedonian folk dance	Tale Ognenovski	1965, Gramophone record "TALE OGNENOVSKI KLARINET SO CHALGIITE" PGP RTB EP 14716
1971	"Ohridsko za raka"	Tale Ognenovski	Tale Ognenovski	03.12.1971, Magnetic tape MRT LN. 1288; 08.11.1977, Magnetic tape MRT LN. 2939; 1965, Gramophone record "TALE OGNENOVSKI KLARINET SO CHALGIITE" PGP RTB EP 14716
1976	"Kavadarsko svadbarsko oro"	Tale Ognenovski	Tale Ognenovski	07.12.1976, Magnetic tape MRT LN. 2617; 1977, Gramophone record "TALE OGNENOVSKI with his own TALE OGNENOVSKI 'CHALGII' ORCHESTRA" PGP RTB EP 14758
1977	"Zhensko Veleshko oro"	Tale Ognenovski	Tale Ognenovski	1977, Gramophone record "TALE OGNENOVSKI with his own TALE OGNENOVSKI 'CHALGII' ORCHESTRA" PGP RTB EP 14758
1977	"Gorno selsko oro"	Tale Ognenovski	Tale Ognenovski	1977, Gramophone record "TALE OGNENOVSKI with his own TALE OGNENOVSKI 'CHALGII' ORCHESTRA" PGP RTB EP 14758
1994	"Nevestinsko oro"	Macedonian folk dance	Tale Ognenovski	1994, Video tape "MUZICHKI SPOMENAR" VHS MRT MP 31087
1978	"Jeni Jol"	Rom folk dance	Tale Ognenovski	1978, Gramophone LP (Long Play) record "MAKEDONSKI NARODNI ORA - MACEDONIAN FOLK DANCES" PGP RTB LP1394 STEREO
1978	"Kjupurlika"	Macedonian folk dance	Tale Ognenovski	1978, Gramophone LP (Long Play) record "MAKEDONSKI NARODNI ORA - MACEDONIAN FOLK DANCES" PGP RTB LP1394 STEREO
1972	"Mashkoto"	Macedonian folk dance	Tale Ognenovski	1972, Gramophone LP (Long Play) record "MAKEDONSKA NARODNA ORA - MACEDONIAN FOLK DANCES" Jugoton LPY-50985 and Cassette Jugoton CAY-249
1972	"Beranche" (or "Bajrache")	Macedonian folk dance	Tale Ognenovski	Magnetic tape MRT LN. 1514/II; 1972, Gramophone LP (Long Play) record "MAKEDONSKA NARODNA ORA - MACEDONIAN FOLK DANCES" Jugoton LPY-50985 and Cassette Jugoton CAY-249
2001	"Talevo kasapsko oro"	Tale Ognenovski	Tale Ognenovski	2001, CD: "Jazz, Macedonian Folk Dances and Classical Music" Catalog: IR04542
1972	"Vlashko kasapsko oro"	Vlach folk dance	Tale Ognenovski	28.01.1972, Magnetic tape MRT LN. 1309
1972	"Karavlashko oro"	Vlach folk dance	Tale Ognenovski	28.01.1972, Magnetic tape MRT LN. 1309/II
1975	"Kukushko oro"	Macedonian folk dance	Tale Ognenovski	20.06.1975, Magnetic tape MRT LN. 2037/II; Magnetic tape MRT LN. 1428/II
1973	"Mogilsko oro"	Tale Ognenovski	Tale Ognenovski	1973, Magnetic tape MRT LN. 1428/II
1975	"Dosta sheta sine oro"	Macedonian folk dance	Tale Ognenovski	11.02.1975, Magnetic tape MRT LN. 1973/I
1982	"Kostursko oro"	Tale Ognenovski	Tale Ognenovski	Magnetic tape MRT LN. 1973; 05.11.1982, Magnetic tape MRT LN. 4512/II
1975	"Pozharsko oro"	Tale Ognenovski	Tale Ognenovski	11.02.1975, Magnetic tape MRT LN. 1973; 23.11.1982, Magnetic tape MRT LN. 4531
1966	"Demirhisarsko oro"	Tale Ognenovski	Tale Ognenovski	22.11.1966, Magnetic tape MRT LN. 7968/II; 1980, Magnetic tape MRT LN. 4178; Magnetic tape MRT LN. 1423/XIV
1982	"Ibraim Odza oro"	Macedonian folk dance	Tale Ognenovski	29.10.1982, Magnetic tape MRT LN. 4508/II; Magnetic tape MRT LN. 7968/I
1982	"Oro Improvizacija"	Tale Ognenovski	Tale Ognenovski	16.11.1982, Magnetic tape MRT LN. 4524; Magnetic tape MRT LN. 85
1975	"Kalinino oro" (or "Kalinsko oro")	Tale Ognenovski	Tale Ognenovski	29.04.1975, Magnetic tape MRT LN. 2041
1975	"Stojanovo oro"	Tale Ognenovski	Tale Ognenovski	29.04.1975, Magnetic tape MRT LN. 2041
1967	"Poeshevsko oro"	Tale Ognenovski	Tale Ognenovski	10.04.1967, Magnetic tape MRT LN. 12/III
1982	"Dafino vino crveno oro"	Macedonian folk dance	Tale Ognenovski	16.11.1982, Magnetic tape MRT LN. 4524; Magnetic tape MRT LN. 7967/II
1962	"Krstachko oro"	Macedonian folk dance	Tale Ognenovski	28.07.1962, Magnetic tape MRT LN. 4026; Magnetic tape MRT LN. 85/III
1967	"Dragorsko oro"	Tale Ognenovski	Tale Ognenovski	10.09.1967, Magnetic tape MRT LN. 299
1975	"Shapkarevo kabadahisko oro"	Macedonian folk dance	Tale Ognenovski	03.09.1975 (and 23.05.1975), Magnetic tape MRT LN. 2052
1975	"Solunsko Kukushko oro"	Macedonian folk dance	Tale Ognenovski	03.09.1975 (and 23.05.1975), Magnetic tape MRT LN. 2052
1972	"Maleshevsko oro"	Macedonian folk dance	Tale Ognenovski	04.10.1972, Magnetic tape MRT LN. 1514/I
1974	"Padinsko oro"	Macedonian folk dance	Tale Ognenovski	01.11.1974, Magnetic tape MRT LN. 1907
1971	"Kumanovsko oro"	Tale Ognenovski	Tale Ognenovski	17.09.1974, Magnetic tape MRT LN. 1971
1976	"Karshilama Apostolova oro"	Macedonian folk dance	Tale Ognenovski	06.04.1976, Magnetic tape MRT LN. 2300
1976	"Mominsko ramno oro"	Tale Ognenovski	Tale Ognenovski	06.04.1976, Magnetic tape MRT LN. 2300
1976	"Atanasovo Pazjansko oro"	Tale Ognenovski	Tale Ognenovski	06.04.1976, Magnetic tape MRT LN. 2300
1975	"Staro Kukushko ramno oro"	Macedonian folk dance	Tale Ognenovski	10.06.1975, Magnetic tape MRT LN. 2369
1976	"Sotirovo mashko oro"	Macedonian folk dance	Tale Ognenovski	11.06.1976, Magnetic tape MRT LN. 2449
1976	"Ristevo ramno oro"	Macedonian folk dance	Tale Ognenovski	11.06.1976, Magnetic tape MRT LN. 2449
1976	"Sotirovo oro od Solunsko"	Macedonian folk dance	Tale Ognenovski	11.06.1976, Magnetic tape MRT LN. 2449
1976	"Babino oro"	Tale Ognenovski	Tale Ognenovski	25.05.1976, Magnetic tape MRT LN. 2505
1976	"Lenino oro"	Tale Ognenovski	Tale Ognenovski	25.05.1976, Magnetic tape MRT LN. 2505
1976	"Gino Ginche oro"	Macedonian folk dance	Tale Ognenovski	31.08.1976, Magnetic tape MRT LN. 2505
1976	"Kufalovsko oro"	Macedonian folk dance	Tale Ognenovski	17.09.1976, Magnetic tape MRT LN. 2562
1976	"Kasapsko Solunsko oro"	Macedonian folk dance	Tale Ognenovski	17.09.1976, Magnetic tape MRT LN. 2562
1976	"Gradoborsko oro"	Macedonian folk dance	Tale Ognenovski	17.09.1976, Magnetic tape MRT LN. 2562
1984	"Oreovsko oro"	Tale Ognenovski	Tale Ognenovski	27.03.1984, Magnetic tape MRT LN. 4960
1984	"Bitolsko novo oro"	Tale Ognenovski	Tale Ognenovski	26.10.1984, Magnetic tapeMRT LN. 5099
1975	"Koga se zorata zazori oro"	Macedonian folk dance	Tale Ognenovski	10.12.1975, Magnetic tape MRT LN. 1928
1975	"Kinisalo bela Mare oro"	Tale Ognenovski	Tale Ognenovski	10.12.1975, Magnetic tape MRT LN. 1928
1975	"Od mnogu odamna oro"	Macedonian folk dance	Tale Ognenovski	09.05.1975, Magnetic tape MRT LN. 2044
1975	"Sivo mi sokle doleta oro"	Macedonian folk dance	Tale Ognenovski	09.05.1975, Magnetic tape MRT LN. 2044
1967	"Novogodishno oro"	Tale Ognenovski	Tale Ognenovski	27.12.1967, Magnetic tape MRT LN. 464/I
1966	"Zajachko oro"	Tale Ognenovski	Tale Ognenovski	22.11.1966, Magnetic tape MRT LN. 7968/III
1962	"Skopsko Drachevsko oro" (or "Drachevsko oro")	Tale Ognenovski	Tale Ognenovski	28.07.1962, Magnetic tape MRT LN. 4026
1966	"Kochansko oro"	Macedonian folk dance	Tale Ognenovski	06.09.1966, Magnetic tape MRT LN. 7641/I
1966	"Tri godini stana oro"	Macedonian folk dance	Tale Ognenovski	25.11.1966, Magnetic tape MRT LN. 7970/III; 09.05.1975, Magnetic tape MRT LN. 2044
1983	"Ajde sleze Lena vo gradina oro"	Macedonian folk dance	Tale Ognenovski	20.09.1983, Magnetic tape MRT LN. 4838
1983	"Veselo za ramo oro - kavalche"	Tale Ognenovski	Tale Ognenovski	29.03.1983, Magnetic tape MRT LN. 5275
N/A	"Polsko oro"	Tale Ognenovski	Tale Ognenovski	Magnetic tape MRT LN. 4024/II
1974	"Prilepsko ramno oro" (or "Ramno Prilepsko oro"	Macedonian folk dance	Tale Ognenovski	1977, Magnetic tape MRT LN. 1634/XII, 22.01.1974, Magnetic tape MRT LN. 1830
1974	"Edno devojche od 16 godini oro"	Macedonian folk dance	Tale Ognenovski	22.01.1974, Magnetic tape MRT LN. 1830/II
1982	"Santino oro"	Tale Ognenovski	Tale Ognenovski	01.10.1982, Magnetic tape MRT LN. 4612
1984	"More dosta ode kalesho mome oro"	Macedonian folk dance	Tale Ognenovski	02.11.1984, Magnetic tape MRT LN. 5102
1964	"Oro br. 6 - kavalche" (or "Oro shest")	Tale Ognenovski	Tale Ognenovski	31.03.1964, Magnetic tape MRT LN. 6293
1986	"Krklinsko oro"	Tale Ognenovski	Tale Ognenovski	14.04.1986, Magnetic tape MRT LN. N/A
N/A	"Pravo oro"	Tale Ognenovski	Tale Ognenovski	Magnetic tape MRT LN. 4024
N/A	"Zaramo Bitolsko oro"	Tale Ognenovski	Tale Ognenovski	Magnetic tape MRT LN. 7970
N/A	"Patruno II oro" (or "Patruno oro")	Tale Ognenovski	Tale Ognenovski	Magnetic tape MRT LN. 28
N/A	"Talevo oro"	Tale Ognenovski	Tale Ognenovski	Magnetic tape MRT LN. 7973
1966	"Oro za pojas oro"	Tale Ognenovski	Tale Ognenovski	Magnetic tape MRT LN. 4023/IV; 1966, Magnetic tape MRT LN. 4024/IV
N/A	"Oro br. 1"	Tale Ognenovski	Tale Ognenovski	Magnetic tape MRT LN. 1699/IV
1958	"Mesheishko oro"	Tale Ognenovski	Tale Ognenovski	1965, Magnetic tape MRT LN. 1910/I; 1958, Magnetic tape MRT LN. 3591/III
N/A	"Brusnichko (Bitolsko) oro	Tale Ognenovski	Tale Ognenovski	Magnetic tape MRT LN. 1698
N/A	"Toska oro"	Macedonian folk dance	Tale Ognenovski	Magnetic tape MRT LN. 4024/III
1986	"Lavchansko oro"	Tale Ognenovski	Tale Ognenovski	Magnetic tape MRT LN. 219/II
N/A	"Gjurgino oro" (or "Gurgino oro")	Tale Ognenovski	Tale Ognenovski	Magnetic tape MRT LN. 464/II
N/A	"Oro chuchek"	Tale Ognenovski	Tale Ognenovski	Magnetic tape MRT LN. 6292/I
N/A	"Makedonsko oro"	Tale Ognenovski	Tale Ognenovski	Magnetic tape MRT LN. N/A
N/A	"Svatovsko oro"	Macedonian folk dance	Tale Ognenovski	Magnetic tape MRT LN. N/A
N/A	"Chalgisko oro"	Macedonian folk dance	Tale Ognenovski	Magnetic tape MRT LN. N/A
1984	"Zhensko za raka oro"	Tale Ognenovski	Tale Ognenovski	Magnetic tape MRT LN. N/A
N/A	"Brusnichko mashko oro" (or "Brusnichko oro (Bitolsko)")	Tale Ognenovski	Tale Ognenovski	Magnetic tape MRT LN. 1698
1965	"Prespansko za ramo oro" (or "Prespansko za raka oro"	Tale Ognenovski	Tale Ognenovski	1965, Magnetic tape MRT LN. 1288/III
N/A	"Drachevska oro"	Macedonian folk dance	Tale Ognenovski	Magnetic tape MRT LN. 435/II
N/A	"Crnogorka oro"	Macedonian folk dance	Tale Ognenovski	Magnetic tape MRT LN. 435/I; Magnetic tape MRT LN. 1690/II
N/A	"Ajde pushka pukna oro"	Macedonian folk dance	Tale Ognenovski	Magnetic tape MRT LN. 1817/I
N/A	"Brusnichko svadbarsko oro"	Tale Ognenovski	Tale Ognenovski	Magnetic tape MRT LN. 4027/III
N/A	"Kalajdzisko oro"	Macedonian folk dance	Tale Ognenovski	Magnetic tape MRT LN. 8002/I; Magnetic tape MRT LN. 1394/II
1966	"Teshka krstachka oro"	Macedonian folk dance	Tale Ognenovski	1966, Magnetic tape MRT LN. 302/II
N/A	"Pokaraj si Dimitrija oro"	Macedonian folk dance	Tale Ognenovski	Magnetic tape MRT LN. 8541/I
N/A	"Ja izlezi libe lichno na pendzere i abre gjurchin Stojne ubava oro"	Macedonian folk dance	Tale Ognenovski	Magnetic tape MRT LN. 976/II
1970	"Komitsko oro"	Macedonian folk dance	Tale Ognenovski	1970, Magnetic tape MRT LN. 1750/I
N/A	"Prilepsko oro"	Tale Ognenovski	Tale Ognenovski	Magnetic tape MRT LN. 1511/III
N/A	"Radovishko oro"	Tale Ognenovski	Tale Ognenovski	Magnetic tape MRT LN. 1243/I
N/A	"Oro potrchano"	Tale Ognenovski	Tale Ognenovski	Magnetic tape MRT LN. 8001/I
N/A	"Beli Ginka oro"	Macedonian folk dance	Tale Ognenovski	Magnetic tape MRT LN. 1739
N/A	"Go pratile dedo vo gradina oro"	Macedonian folk dance	Tale Ognenovski	Magnetic tape MRT LN. 1364/II
N/A	"Vatila zima zima golema i ja pratile Lena oro"	Macedonian folk dance	Tale Ognenovski	Magnetic tape MRT LN. 983/II
N/A	"Nejkjum nejkjum nevesta da bidam i iznikna mi baden drvo oro"	Macedonian folk dance	Tale Ognenovski	Magnetic tape MRT LN. 984/III
N/A	"Zapali Tinke mori borina i Maro Marike oro"	Macedonian folk dance	Tale Ognenovski	Magnetic tape MRT LN. 984/II
N/A	"Ovchepolsko oro"	Macedonian folk dance	Tale Ognenovski	Magnetic tape MRT LN. 8532/I
N/A	"Oti mome sedmojanche oro"	Macedonian folk dance	Tale Ognenovski	Magnetic tape MRT LN. 1296/II
N/A	"Pajdushko oro"	Tale Ognenovski	Tale Ognenovski	Magnetic tape MRT LN. 1072/II; Magnetic tape MRT LN. 2733/I
N/A	"Staro pravo oro"	Macedonian folk dance	Tale Ognenovski	Magnetic tape MRT LN. 7226/I
N/A	"Shto si naluteno libe oro"	Macedonian folk dance	Tale Ognenovski	Magnetic tape MRT LN. 1684/II
N/A	"Devojche belo crveno oro"	Macedonian folk dance	Tale Ognenovski	Magnetic tape MRT LN. 1339/I
N/A	"Lisichko pajdushko oro"	Macedonian folk dance	Tale Ognenovski	Magnetic tape MRT LN. 2733/II
N/A	"Kiten mi kiten devere oro"	Macedonian folk dance	Tale Ognenovski	Magnetic tape MRT LN. 12/II
N/A	"Oj ti mome maloj mome oro"	Macedonian folk dance	Tale Ognenovski	Magnetic tape MRT LN. 1817/III
N/A	"Belasichko oro"	Macedonian folk dance	Tale Ognenovski	Magnetic tape LN. 7893/I
N/A	"Oj devojche oro"	Macedonian folk dance	Tale Ognenovski	Magnetic tape MRT LN. 7753/III
N/A	"Pojde baba na oroto"	Macedonian folk dance	Tale Ognenovski	Magnetic tape MRT LN. 2822/II
N/A	"Oro Skopsko"	Macedonian folk dance	Tale Ognenovski	Magnetic tape MRT LN. 7641/III
N/A	"Todoro libe Todoro oro"	Macedonian folk dance	Tale Ognenovski	Magnetic tape MRT LN. 1739
N/A	Vuchidolsko oro"	Macedonian folk dance	Tale Ognenovski	Magnetic tape MRT LN. 1610/I
N/A	"Davaj me mila mamo oro"	Macedonian folk dance	Tale Ognenovski	Magnetic tape MRT LN. 7753/IV
N/A	"Oro br. 2" (or "Oro dva")	Tale Ognenovski	Tale Ognenovski	Magnetic tape MRT LN. 6294/I
N/A	"Oro br. 3"	Tale Ognenovski	Tale Ognenovski	Magnetic tape MRT LN. 6294/II
N/A	"Oro br. 4"	Tale Ognenovski	Tale Ognenovski	Magnetic tape MRT LN. 7302/III
N/A	"Oro br. 5"	Tale Ognenovski	Tale Ognenovski	Magnetic tape MRT LN. 7974/II
N/A	"Oro br. 7"	Tale Ognenovski	Tale Ognenovski	Magnetic tape MRT LN. 853/XIX
N/A	"Odi mome odi dolu vo seloto oro"	Macedonian folk dance	Tale Ognenovski	Magnetic tape MRT LN. 1854/II
N/A	"Petleto pee na Lesa oro"	Macedonian folk dance	Tale Ognenovski	Magnetic tape MRT LN. 1672/IV
N/A	"Staro Prilepsko oro"	Macedonian folk dance	Tale Ognenovski	Magnetic tape MRT LN. 2622/I
N/A	"Ke ti kazham Zore oro"	Macedonian folk dance	Tale Ognenovski	Magnetic tape MRT LN. 1612/I
N/A	"Postupano dvanaestorka oro"	Macedonian folk dance	Tale Ognenovski	Magnetic tape MRT LN. 1295/I
N/A	"Oro br. 8 - kavalche"	Tale Ognenovski	Tale Ognenovski	Magnetic tape MRT LN. 6293/III
N/A	"Oro br. 9"	Tale Ognenovski	Tale Ognenovski	Magnetic tape MRT LN. 1830/I
N/A	"Oro br. 10 - kavalche"	Tale Ognenovski	Tale Ognenovski	Magnetic tape MRT LN. 6293/I
N/A	"Guguvche galeno bre oro"	Macedonian folk dance	Tale Ognenovski	Magnetic tape MRT LN. 7971/II
1960	"Ezgija, potoa oro"	Tale Ognenovski	Tale Ognenovski	1960, Magnetic tape MRT LN. 6293/II
N/A	"Mome sedi na pendzere oro"	Macedonian folk dance	Tale Ognenovski	Magnetic tape MRT LN. 7971/III
N/A	"Orel dedo i stani Stanke oro"	Macedonian folk dance	Tale Ognenovski	Magnetic tape MRT LN. 1698/IV
1983	"Devojce, devojce oro"	Macedonian folk dance	Tale Ognenovski	23.09.1983, Magnetic tape MRT LN. 1733/II
N/A	"Oro br. 11"	Tale Ognenovski	Tale Ognenovski	Magnetic tape MRT LN. 6294/III
1982	"Bachko oro"	Tale Ognenovski	Tale Ognenovski	23.11.1982, Magnetic tape MRT LN. 4531; 23.11.1982, Magnetic tape MRT LN. 4543
1983	"Devojche devojche crveno jabolche oro"	Tale Ognenovski	Tale Ognenovski	23.09.1983, Magnetic tape MRT LN. 4839/III
1983	"Talevo Genimalsko oro" (or "Gjenimalsko (Talevo) oro" or "Gjenimalsko oro" or "Talevo Jenimalsko oro")	Tale Ognenovski	Tale Ognenovski	07.10.1983, Magnetic tape MRT LN. 4849
1984	"Talevo Skopsko oro" (or "Skopsko Talevo oro")	Tale Ognenovski	Tale Ognenovski	06.01.1984, Magnetic tape MRT LN. 4901
1984	"Prilepsko novo oro"	Tale Ognenovski	Tale Ognenovski	19.10.1984, Magnetic tape MRT LN. 5103
1984	"Bitolsko Brusnichko oro"	Tale Ognenovski	Tale Ognenovski	02.11.1984, Magnetic tape MRT LN. 5102/I
1984	"Bitolsko Lavchansko oro" (or "Lavchansko oro")	Tale Ognenovski	Tale Ognenovski	06.11.1984, Magnetic tape MRT LN. 5109
1984	"Bitolsko Bukovsko oro"	Tale Ognenovski	Tale Ognenovski	06.11.1984, Magnetic tape MRT LN. 5109
1984	"Sharsko kozarsko oro – kavalche"	Tale Ognenovski	Tale Ognenovski	04.12.1984, Magnetic tape MRT LN. 5201
N/A	"Bukovachko oro"	Tale Ognenovski	Tale Ognenovski	Magnetic tape MRT LN. 56/I
1970	Concert "Fiori Rossiniani"	Ernesto Cavallini	N/A	970, Magnetic tape MRT LN. N/A
1987	Concert "Concert in A Major for Clarinet and Orchestra K. 622"	Wolfgang Amadeus Mozart	N/A	1987, Magnetic tape MRT LN. N/A
1987	Concert "Adagio for Clarinet"	Richard Wagner	N/A	1987, Magnetic tape MRT LN. N/A
1976	"Sultana Pulkova oro"	Tale Ognenovski	Tale Ognenovski	07.12.1976, Magnetic tape MRT LN. 2612; Magnetic tape MRT LN. 2617
1964	"Krushevsko oro"	Kocho Petrovski	Kocho Petrovski and Tale Ognenovski	1964, Gramophone record "MAKEDONSKA ORA - MACEDONIAN FOLK DANCES" PGP RTB EP 14703
1964	"Podripnushka oro"	Macedonian folk dance	Kocho Petrovski and Tale Ognenovski	1964, Gramophone record "MAKEDONSKA ORA - MACEDONIAN FOLK DANCES" PGP RTB EP 14703
1963	"Skopsko oro"	Kocho Petrovski	Angel Nanchevski, Nikolaj Galevski and Tale Ognenovski	1963, Gramophone record "MAKEDONSKA ORA - MACEDONIAN FOLK DANCES" PGP RTB EP 14700
1964	"Dolnensko zaramo oro"	Pece Atanasovski and Tale Ognenovski	Pece Atanasovski and Tale Ognenovski	1964, Gramophone record "MAKEDONSKA ORA" PGP RTB EP 14704
1982	"Galichko oro"	Tale Ognenovski	Tale Ognenovski	1982, Magnetic tape MRT LN. N/A
1980	"Gevgelisko zhensko oro"	Tale Ognenovski	Tale Ognenovski	1980, Magnetic tape MRT LN. N/A
1986	"Krstorsko mashko oro"	Tale Ognenovski	Tale Ognenovski	31.10.1986, Magnetic tape MRT LN. 5634/I
1965,	"Stani Stanke oro"	Macedonian folk dance	Tale Ognenovski	1965, Magnetic tape MRT LN. N/A
1967	"Zhivkino oro"	Tale Ognenovski	Tale Ognenovski	27.12.1967, Magnetic tape MRT LN. N/A
1980	"Dimchevo oro" (or "Dimevo oro")	Tale Ognenovski	Tale Ognenovski	1980, Magnetic tape MRT LN. N/A
1980	"Micino oro"	Tale Ognenovski	Tale Ognenovski	1980, Magnetic tape MRT LN. N/A
1980	"Fanino oro"	Tale Ognenovski	Tale Ognenovski	1980, Magnetic tape MRT LN. N/A
1980	"Delchevsko zhensko oro"	Tale Ognenovski	Tale Ognenovski	1980, Magnetic tape MRT LN. N/A
1987	"Negotinsko zhensko oro	Tale Ognenovski	Tale Ognenovski	1987, Magnetic tape MRT LN. N/A
1987	"Ilchovo oro"	Tale Ognenovski	Tale Ognenovski	1987, Magnetic tape MRT LN. N/A
1983	"Paunovo oro"	Tale Ognenovski	Tale Ognenovski	1983, Magnetic tape MRT LN. N/A
1982	"Bozhikovo oro"	Tale Ognenovski	Tale Ognenovski	1982, Magnetic tape MRT LN. N/A
1980	"Gjavatsko potpelistersko oro" (or "Gjavatsko oro")	Tale Ognenovski	Tale Ognenovski	1980, Magnetic tape MRT LN. N/A
1980	"Gradsko veselo oro" (or "Gradsko oro")	Tale Ognenovski	Tale Ognenovski	1980, Magnetic tape MRT LN. N/A
1982	"Negotinsko mashko oro"	Tale Ognenovski	Tale Ognenovski	1982, Magnetic tape MRT LN. N/A
1972	"Kasapsko shapkarevo oro"	Macedonian folk dance	Tale Ognenovski	1972, Magnetic tape MRT LN. N/A
1975	"Sivo mi sokle doleta oro"	Macedonian folk dance	Tale Ognenovski	09.05.1975, Magnetic tape MRT LN. 2044
1962	"More dosta ode Cveto mome oro"	Macedonian folk dance	Tale Ognenovski	1962, Magnetic tape MRT LN. N/A
N/A	"Gajdarsko oro"	Macedonian folk dance	Tale Ognenovski	Magnetic tape MRT LN. N/A
1971	"Ohridsko oro za raka"	Tale Ognenovski	Tale Ognenovski	02.12.1971, Magnetic tape MRT LN. 1288
1960	"Andon ide od charshija oro"	Macedonian folk dance	Tale Ognenovski	1960, Magnetic tape MRT LN. N/A
N/A	"Talevo Prilepsko oro"	Tale Ognenovski	Tale Ognenovski	Magnetic tape MRT LN. N/A
1985	"Sharsko oro"	Tale Ognenovski	Tale Ognenovski	11.01.1985, Magnetic tape MRT LN. 5321; 2001, CD: "Jazz, Macedonian Folk Dances and Classical Music" Catalog: IR04542
N/A	"Zletovsko oro"	Tale Ognenovski	Tale Ognenovski	Magnetic tape MRT LN. N/A
1985	"Lipovo oro"	Tale Ognenovski	Tale Ognenovski	11.01.1985, Magnetic tape MRT LN. 5321
N/A	"Talevo Palanechko pajdushko veselo oro"	Tale Ognenovski	Tale Ognenovski	Magnetic tape MRT LN. N/A
N/A	"Bitolsko Gjavatsko oro"	Tale Ognenovski	Tale Ognenovski	Magnetic tape MRT LN. N/A
N/A	"Talevo oro Kitka"	Tale Ognenovski	Tale Ognenovski	Magnetic tape MRT LN. N/A
N/A	"Kumanovsko svadbarsko oro"	Tale Ognenovski	Tale Ognenovski	Magnetic tape MRT LN. N/A
N/A	"Tetovsko oro"	Tale Ognenovski	Tale Ognenovski	Magnetic tape MRT LN. N/A
N/A	"Ohridsko zhensko oro"	Tale Ognenovski	Tale Ognenovski	Magnetic tape MRT LN. N/A
N/A	"Stezhevsko oro"	Tale Ognenovski	Tale Ognenovski	Magnetic tape MRT LN. N/A
N/A	"Mavrovsko oro"	Tale Ognenovski	Tale Ognenovski	Magnetic tape MRT LN. N/A
N/A	"Nevenino Lavchansko oro"	Tale Ognenovski	Tale Ognenovski	Magnetic tape MRT LN. N/A
N/A	"Donkino oro"	Macedonian folk dance	Tale Ognenovski	Magnetic tape MRT LN. N/A
N/A	"Mitevo oro"	Tale Ognenovski	Tale Ognenovski	Magnetic tape MRT LN. N/A
1979	"Kumovo oro"	Tale Ognenovski	Tale Ognenovski	09.11.1979, Magnetic tape MRT LN. 3763; 1965, Gramophone record "TALE OGNENOVSKI KLARINET SO CHALGIITE" PGP RTB RTB EP 14711
1980	"Gratsko oro"	Tale Ognenovski	Tale Ognenovski	Magnetic tape MRT LN. N/A
1969	"Svadbarsko oro"	Tale Ognenovski	Tale Ognenovski	1969, Magnetic tape MRT LN. N/A
N/A	"Shupelkarsko oro"	Tale Ognenovski	Tale Ognenovski	Magnetic tape MRT LN. N/A
N/A	"Askersko oro"	Tale Ognenovski	Tale Ognenovski	Magnetic tape MRT LN. N/A
N/A	"Gajda oro"	Tale Ognenovski	Tale Ognenovski	Magnetic tape MRT LN. N/A
N/A	"Gurgino oro"	Tale Ognenovski	Tale Ognenovski	Magnetic tape MRT LN. N/A
N/A	"Kukarachansko oro"	Tale Ognenovski	Tale Ognenovski	Magnetic tape MRT LN. N/A
N/A	"Lovchansko oro"	Tale Ognenovski	Tale Ognenovski	Magnetic tape MRT LN. N/A
N/A	"Marija mlada nevesto oro"	Tale Ognenovski	Tale Ognenovski	Magnetic tape MRT LN. N/A
N/A	"Ograzdensko oro"	Tale Ognenovski	Tale Ognenovski	Magnetic tape MRT LN. N/A
N/A	"Ravno oro"	Tale Ognenovski	Tale Ognenovski	Magnetic tape MRT LN. N/A
N/A	"Trgna Donka oro"	Macedonian folk dance	Tale Ognenovski	Magnetic tape MRT LN. N/A
N/A	"Zhumbekavsko oro"	Tale Ognenovski	Tale Ognenovski	Magnetic tape MRT LN. N/A
N/A	"Kolajnsko oro"	Tale Ognenovski	Tale Ognenovski	Magnetic tape MRT LN. N/A
N/A	"Sharsko za ramo oro"	Tale Ognenovski	Tale Ognenovski	Magnetic tape MRT LN. N/A
N/A	"Skopski chochek"	Tale Ognenovski	Tale Ognenovski	Magnetic tape MRT LN. N/A
N/A	"Talevo Bitolsko oro"	Tale Ognenovski	Tale Ognenovski	Magnetic tape MRT LN. N/A
N/A	"Staro komitsko oro"	Macedonian folk dance	Tale Ognenovski	Magnetic tape MRT LN. N/A
N/A	"Staro Kukushko oro"	Macedonian folk dance	Tale Ognenovski	Magnetic tape MRT LN. N/A
N/A	"Teshko oro"	Macedonian folk dance	Tale Ognenovski	Magnetic tape MRT LN. N/A
N/A	"Shapkarevo oro"	Macedonian folk dance	Tale Ognenovski	Magnetic tape MRT LN. N/A
N/A	"Ajvatovsko oro"	Macedonian folk dance	Tale Ognenovski	Magnetic tape MRT LN. N/A
N/A	"Cvetkovo oro"	Macedonian folk dance	Tale Ognenovski	Magnetic tape MRT LN. N/A
N/A	"Kinisalo bela Mare oro"	Tale Ognenovski	Tale Ognenovski	Magnetic tape MRT LN. N/A
N/A	"Kitka na ora"	Tale Ognenovski	Tale Ognenovski	Magnetic tape MRT LN. N/A
N/A	"Na poslednata sredba oro"	Macedonian folk dance	Tale Ognenovski	Magnetic tape MRT LN. N/A
N/A	"Od umot se podizgubiv oro"	Macedonian folk dance	Tale Ognenovski	Magnetic tape MRT LN. N/A
N/A	"Oj ovchare oro"	Macedonian folk dance	Tale Ognenovski	Magnetic tape MRT LN. N/A
N/A	"Oro chochek"	Macedonian folk dance	Tale Ognenovski	Magnetic tape MRT LN. N/A
N/A	"Para berit kiselec oro"	Macedonian folk dance	Tale Ognenovski	Magnetic tape MRT LN. N/A
N/A	"Pet ora"	Tale Ognenovski	Tale Ognenovski	Magnetic tape MRT LN. N/A
N/A	"Tetovsko svadbarsko oro"	Macedonian folk dance	Tale Ognenovski	Magnetic tape MRT LN. N/A
N/A	"Vrbanijsko oro"	Macedonian folk dance	Tale Ognenovski	Magnetic tape MRT LN. N/A
N/A	"Zagarievo oro"	Macedonian folk dance	Tale Ognenovski	Magnetic tape MRT LN. N/A
N/A	"Bez tebe oro"	Macedonian folk dance	Tale Ognenovski	Magnetic tape MRT LN. N/A
2001	"Tale Ognenovski Concert for Clarinet No. 1"	Tale Ognenovski	Tale Ognenovski	2001, CD: "Jazz, Macedonian Folk Dances and Classical Music"; Catalog: IR 04542; 2005, CD: "MOZART and OGNENOVSKI Clarinet Concertos"; Catalog: IR 37223
2005	"Clarinet Concerto in A Major, K.622: Allegro"	Wolfgang Amadeus Mozart	Tale Ognenovski	2005, CD: "MOZART and OGNENOVSKI Clarinet Concertos"; Catalog: IR 37223
2005	"Clarinet Concerto in A Major, K.622: Adagio"	Wolfgang Amadeus Mozart	Tale Ognenovski	2005, CD: "MOZART and OGNENOVSKI Clarinet Concertos"; Catalog: IR 37223
2005	"Clarinet Concerto in A Major, K.622: Rondo – Allegro"	Wolfgang Amadeus Mozart	Tale Ognenovski	2005, CD: "MOZART and OGNENOVSKI Clarinet Concertos"; Catalog: IR 37223
2001	"Tale Ognenovski Jazz Composition No. 1"	Tale Ognenovski	Tale Ognenovski	2001, CD: "Jazz, Macedonian Folk Dances and Classical Music"; Catalog: IR 04542; 2008, CD: "Macedonian Clarinet Jazz Composed By Tale Ognenovski"; Catalog: IR 38824
2008	"Tale Ognenovski Jazz Composition No. 2"	Tale Ognenovski	Tale Ognenovski	2008, CD: "Macedonian Clarinet Jazz Composed By Tale Ognenovski"; Catalog: IR 38824
2008	"Tale Ognenovski Jazz Composition No. 3"	Tale Ognenovski	Tale Ognenovski	2008, CD: "Macedonian Clarinet Jazz Composed By Tale Ognenovski"; Catalog: IR 38824
2008	"Tale Ognenovski Jazz Composition No. 4"	Tale Ognenovski	Tale Ognenovski	2008, CD: "Macedonian Clarinet Jazz Composed By Tale Ognenovski"; Catalog: IR 38824
2001	"Tale Ognenovski Jazz Composition No. 5"	Tale Ognenovski	Tale Ognenovski	2001, CD: "Jazz, Macedonian Folk Dances and Classical Music"; Catalog: IR 04542; 2008, CD: "Macedonian Clarinet Jazz Composed By Tale Ognenovski"; Catalog: IR 38824
2008	"Tale Ognenovski Jazz Composition No. 6"	Tale Ognenovski	Tale Ognenovski	2008, CD: "Macedonian Clarinet Jazz Composed By Tale Ognenovski"; Catalog: IR 38824
2008	"Tale Ognenovski Jazz Composition No. 7"	Tale Ognenovski	Tale Ognenovski	2008, CD: "Macedonian Clarinet Jazz Composed By Tale Ognenovski"; Catalog: IR 38824
2001	"Tale Ognenovski Jazz Composition No. 8"	Tale Ognenovski	Tale Ognenovski	2001, CD: "Jazz, Macedonian Folk Dances and Classical Music"; Catalog: IR 04542; 2008, CD: "Macedonian Clarinet Jazz Composed By Tale Ognenovski"; Catalog: IR 38824
2008	"Tale Ognenovski Jazz Composition No. 9"	Tale Ognenovski	Tale Ognenovski	2008, CD: "Macedonian Clarinet Jazz Composed By Tale Ognenovski"; Catalog: IR 38824
2008	"Tale Ognenovski Jazz Composition No. 10"	Tale Ognenovski	Tale Ognenovski	2008, CD: "Macedonian Clarinet Jazz Composed By Tale Ognenovski"; Catalog: IR 38824
2008	"Tale Ognenovski Jazz Composition No. 11"	Tale Ognenovski	Tale Ognenovski	2008, CD: "Macedonian Clarinet Jazz Composed By Tale Ognenovski"; Catalog: IR 38824
2008	"Tale Ognenovski Jazz Composition No. 12"	Tale Ognenovski	Tale Ognenovski	2008, CD: "Macedonian Clarinet Jazz Composed By Tale Ognenovski"; Catalog: IR 38824
2016	"Mozart Clarinet Concerto in A, K. 622 Allegro Arranged for First Clarinet by Tale Ognenovski"	Wolfgang Amadeus Mozart	Tale Ognenovski and Stevan Ognenovski	2016, CD: "Mozart Clarinet Concerto in A, K. 622 Arranged for Two Clarinets by Tale Ognenovski"; Catalog: IR 43832
2016	"Mozart Clarinet Concerto in A, K. 622 Adagio Arranged for First Clarinet by Tale Ognenovski"	Wolfgang Amadeus Mozart	Tale Ognenovski and Stevan Ognenovski	2016, CD: "Mozart Clarinet Concerto in A, K. 622 Arranged for Two Clarinets by Tale Ognenovski"; Catalog: IR 43832
2016	"Mozart Clarinet Concerto in A, K. 622 Rondo Allegro Arranged for First Clarinet by Tale Ognenovski"	Wolfgang Amadeus Mozart	Tale Ognenovski and Stevan Ognenovski	2016, CD: "Mozart Clarinet Concerto in A, K. 622 Arranged for Two Clarinets by Tale Ognenovski"; Catalog: IR 43832
2016	"Mozart Clarinet Concerto in A, K. 622 Allegro Arranged for Two Clarinets by Tale Ognenovski"	Wolfgang Amadeus Mozart	Tale Ognenovski and Stevan Ognenovski	2016, CD: "Mozart Clarinet Concerto in A, K. 622 Arranged for Two Clarinets by Tale Ognenovski"; Catalog: IR 43832
2016	"Mozart Clarinet Concerto in A, K. 622 Adagio Arranged for Two Clarinets by Tale Ognenovski"	Wolfgang Amadeus Mozart	Tale Ognenovski and Stevan Ognenovski	2016, CD: "Mozart Clarinet Concerto in A, K. 622 Arranged for Two Clarinets by Tale Ognenovski"; Catalog: IR 43832
2016	"Mozart Clarinet Concerto in A, K. 622 Rondo Allegro Arranged for Two Clarinets by Tale Ognenovski"	Wolfgang Amadeus Mozart	Tale Ognenovski and Stevan Ognenovski	2016, CD: "Mozart Clarinet Concerto in A, K. 622 Arranged for Two Clarinets by Tale Ognenovski"; Catalog: IR 43832
2016	"Mozart Clarinet Concerto in A, K. 622 Allegro Arranged for Second Clarinet by Tale Ognenovski"	Wolfgang Amadeus Mozart	Tale Ognenovski and Stevan Ognenovski	2016, CD: "Mozart Clarinet Concerto in A, K. 622 Arranged for Two Clarinets by Tale Ognenovski"; Catalog: IR 43832
2016	"Mozart Clarinet Concerto in A, K. 622 Adagio Arranged for Second Clarinet by Tale Ognenovski"	Wolfgang Amadeus Mozart	Tale Ognenovski and Stevan Ognenovski	2016, CD: "Mozart Clarinet Concerto in A, K. 622 Arranged for Two Clarinets by Tale Ognenovski"; Catalog: IR 43832
2016	"Mozart Clarinet Concerto in A, K. 622 Rondo Allegro Arranged for Second Clarinet by Tale Ognenovski"	Wolfgang Amadeus Mozart	Tale Ognenovski and Stevan Ognenovski	2016, CD: "Mozart Clarinet Concerto in A, K. 622 Arranged for Two Clarinets by Tale Ognenovski"; Catalog: IR 43832
