= Brusnik, Bitola =

Brusnik Брусник
- Village
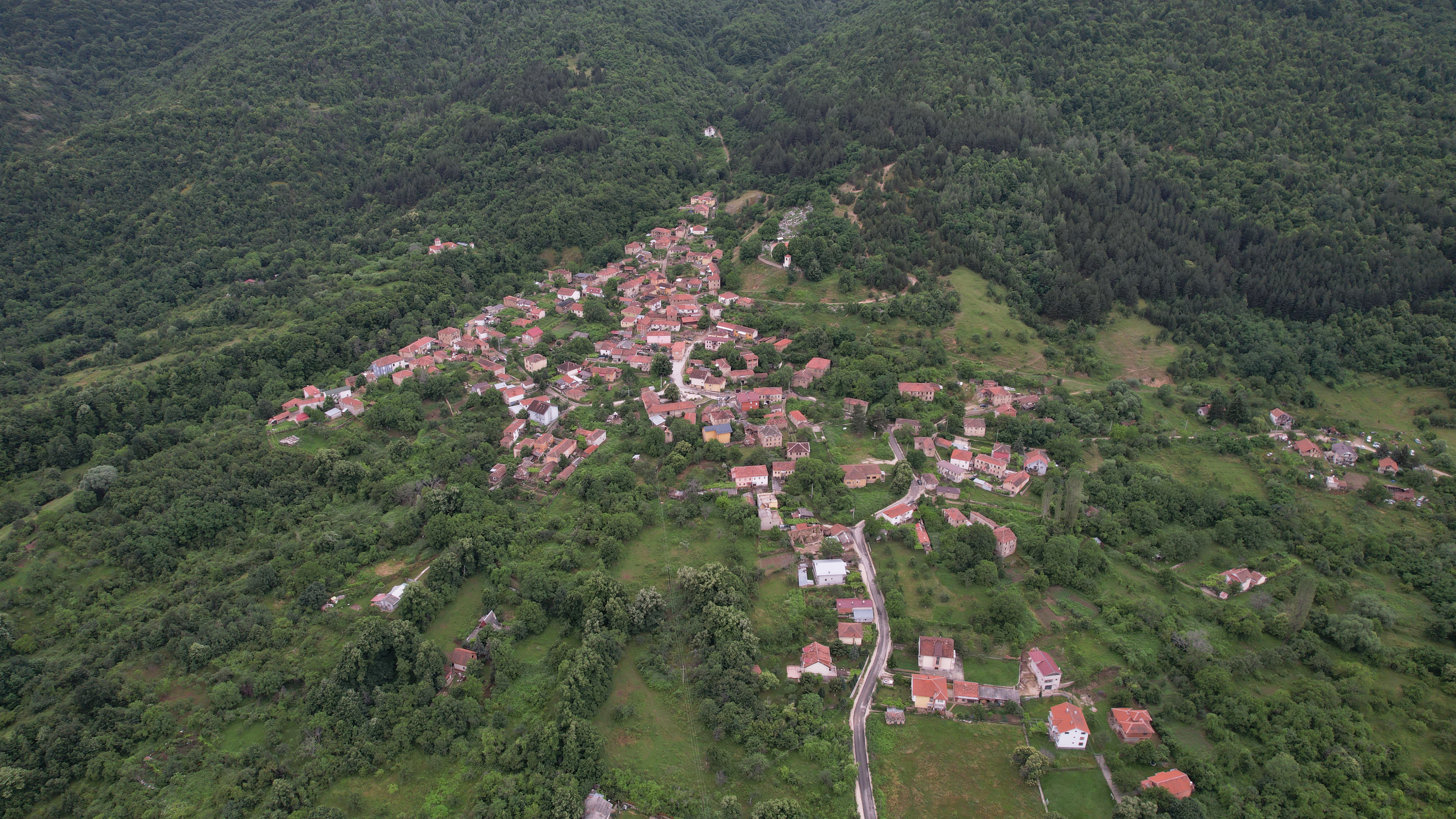
- Air view of the village

- Location within North Macedonia
- Coordinates: 41°1′22.47″N 21°17′6.01″E
- Country: North Macedonia
- Region: Pelagonia
- Municipality: Bitola

Population (2002)
  - Total: 241
- Time zone: UTC+1 (CET)
  - Summer (DST): UTC+2 (CEST)

Brusnik (Macedonian: Брусник), is a village in the Bitola Municipality of North Macedonia.

== History ==
Brusnik is not attested in the Ottoman 1467–1468 defter (tax registry) of the vilayet of Manastir, nor the 1568–1569 defter. According to Qemal Murati (2022), there were some heads of households in the village that were of Albanian origin some time in the 15th–16th centuries, though no defter is referenced. The oldest mention of the village dates to the first half of the 17th century. It was according to the inhabitants established by two of the families that still lived in the village in the 20th century.

There is a monastery with two churches in the village.

== Demographics ==
According to the statistics of Bulgarian geographer Dimitar Mishev (pseudonymed "D. M. Brancoff"), the village had a total Christian population of 944 in 1905, consisting of 488 Patriarchist Bulgarians and 456 Exarchist Bulgarians, and there were 2 schools, one Bulgarian and one Greek.

In 1955, all of the inhabitants were Slavic Macedonians. According to the 2002 census, total population is 241.

== Notable people ==
Tale Ognenovski - clarinetist and composer

== Sources ==
- Stojanovski, Aleksandar (1971). Турски документи за историјата на македонскиот народ: Опширен пописен дефтер бр. 4 : (1467-1468 година). архив на Македонија.
- Stojanovski, Aleksandar (2008). Турски документи за историјата на македонскиот народ: Опширен пописен дефтер 1568-69 година. архив на Македонија.
- Trifunoski, Jovan F. (1998). Битољско-Прилепска котлина: антропогеографска проучавања (1914-1997). Српска академија наука и уметности.
