= Lavci =

Lavci Лавци
- Village
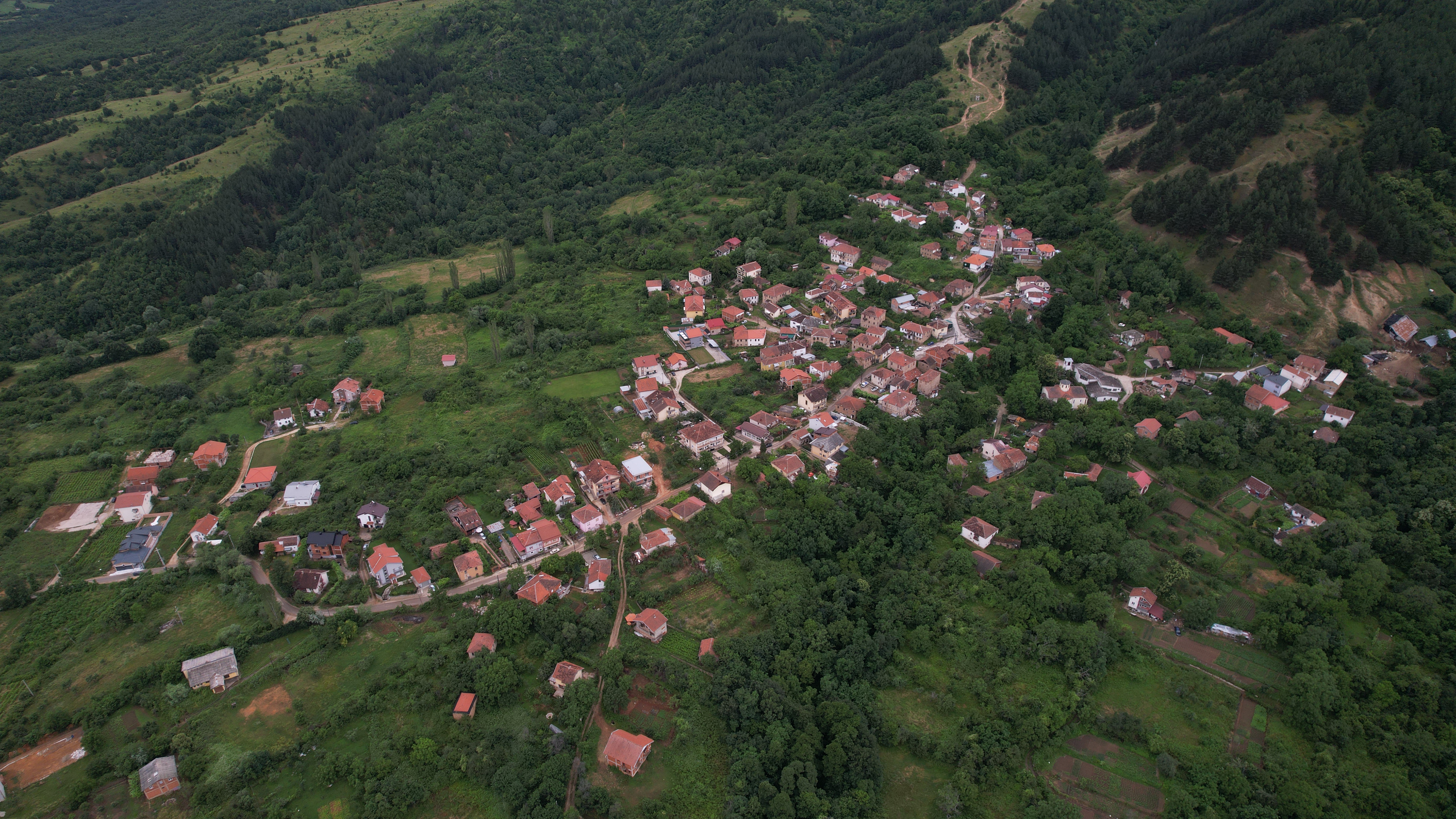
- Air view of the village

- Location within North Macedonia
- Country: North Macedonia
- Region: Pelagonia
- Municipality: Bitola

Population (2002)
  - Total: 338
- Time zone: UTC+1 (CET)
  - Summer (DST): UTC+2 (CEST)

Lavci is a village in the Bitola Municipality, North Macedonia near the city of Bitola. It is located on Baba mountain connecting with Bitola with the road "Lavchanski pat" (Лавчански пат).

== Demographics ==
Lavci is attested in the Ottoman defter of 1467/68 as a village in the vilayet of Manastir. A majority of names attested bore mixed Slavic-Albanian anthroponyms, such as Gon, son of Gin, Dedie Vlash, Petko Gin among others.

According to the 2002 census, the village had a total of 338 inhabitants. Ethnic groups in the village include:

- Macedonians 336
- Others 2

== Notable residents ==
- Kochovska
- Cane Solunchevski
