= Izvor (album) =

Studio album by Karolina Gočeva
- Released: 23 February 2018
- Studio: Studio XL
- Genre: Macedonian folk music; pop
- Length: 42:57
- Language: Macedonian
- Label: Avalon Production; Croatia Records
- Producer: Nikola Micevski; Dejan Momirovski

Karolina Gočeva chronology
Makedonsko Devojče 2 (2014)	Izvor (2018)	Pesni za Ljubov i Kopnež (2022)

Singles from Izvor
- 1. "Dzvona" Released: 19 December 2017; 2. "Beli cvetovi" Released: 31 October 2018

Izvor (in Macedonian Cyrillic: Извор, English translation: Spring) is the ninth studio album by Macedonian singer Karolina Gočeva released on 23 February 2018. Avalon Production released the album in North Macedonia and subsequently, it was made available for streaming on platforms such as iTunes Store and Spotify. In April 2019, the album was also released in Croatia through Croatia Records, marking the singer's first release in the country.

As with her two previous releases, Nikola Micevski and Dejan Momirovski served as the main producers, while Vesna Malinova served as the main songwriter. Musically, the album marks a more pop-oriented shift as opposed to the ethno and Macedonian folk music sound prominent on her previous two releases Makedonsko Devojče and Makedonsko Devojče 2. The album was well received by the audience and by several music critics. The album was commercially successful in North Macedonia and Croatia, where it managed to peak at number 33 on the Croatian Albums Chart on 13 March 2019.

"Dzvona" was released as the album's lead single on 19 December 2017 along with an accompanying music video. "Beli cvetovi" was released as the album's second single on 31 October 2018 along with a music video. Both singles were well received by the singer's fanbase and the wider audience and have garnered 3.3 million and 1.4 million views on YouTube as of 2022, respectively. The album was promoted through a seven-concert tour in February and March 2018 at the Macedonian Opera and Ballet in Skopje. The promotional tour also visited other cities in the country, including Ohrid, Bitola, Tetovo, Gostivar, Kumanovo, Štip and Strumica.

== Background and release ==
In 2014, Karolina Gočeva released her traditional and ethno-oriented album Makedonsko Devojče 2. As the previous album in the project Makedonsko Devojče the album was very well received by the music critics and listeners. The album was also extensively promoted with a Balkan tour of concerts, gigs and festival performances in North Macedonia, Serbia and Bulgaria. After the conclusion of the promotion in 2016, the singer started working on a new studio album.

The cover art for the album and its title were revealed on the singer's Instagram account several days before its release in February 2018. It shows a portrait of Gočeva painted by her husband, Mihail Korubin who is also a professional artist. The album consists of eleven songs, nine of which were written by Vesna Malinova and one by Vesna "Bejbi" Petrushevska. All songs were recorded, mixed and mastered at XL Studio in Skopje. Nikola Micevski and Dejan Momirovski served as producers for all songs.

Izvor was released in North Macedonia on 23 February 2018 through Avalon Production. It was also made available for digital downloading and streaming through platforms such as Amazon, iTunes Store and Spotify. In April 2019, the album was also released in Croatia through the record label Croatia Records, marking the singer's first album to be released in the country.

== Music and lyrics ==
During an interview, Gocheva said that while the album was representative of a similar stage of her life as the two albums of the Makedonsko Devojče project, it marked a change in sound, being closer to the pop genre as opposed to the more ethno sound of the previous projects. As she worked with the same producers and songwriters, the songs share the same arrangements. She also revealed that due to the expectations from the audience following the success of the Makedonsko Devojče projects, the singer and her collaborators felt burdened to do it justice. Nevertheless, after the finalization of the project, she felt that Izvor marked a step forward in her career and a sound she identifies herself the most with.

"Dzvona", released around the date of Christmas and New Year's Eve, is holiday-themed and features an all-female choir. It is a "nostalgic" track that commemorates certain people who are "present in our hearts but are not present in our lives". "Budna", the last song on the album's track listing, is an emotional ballad.

== Promotion ==
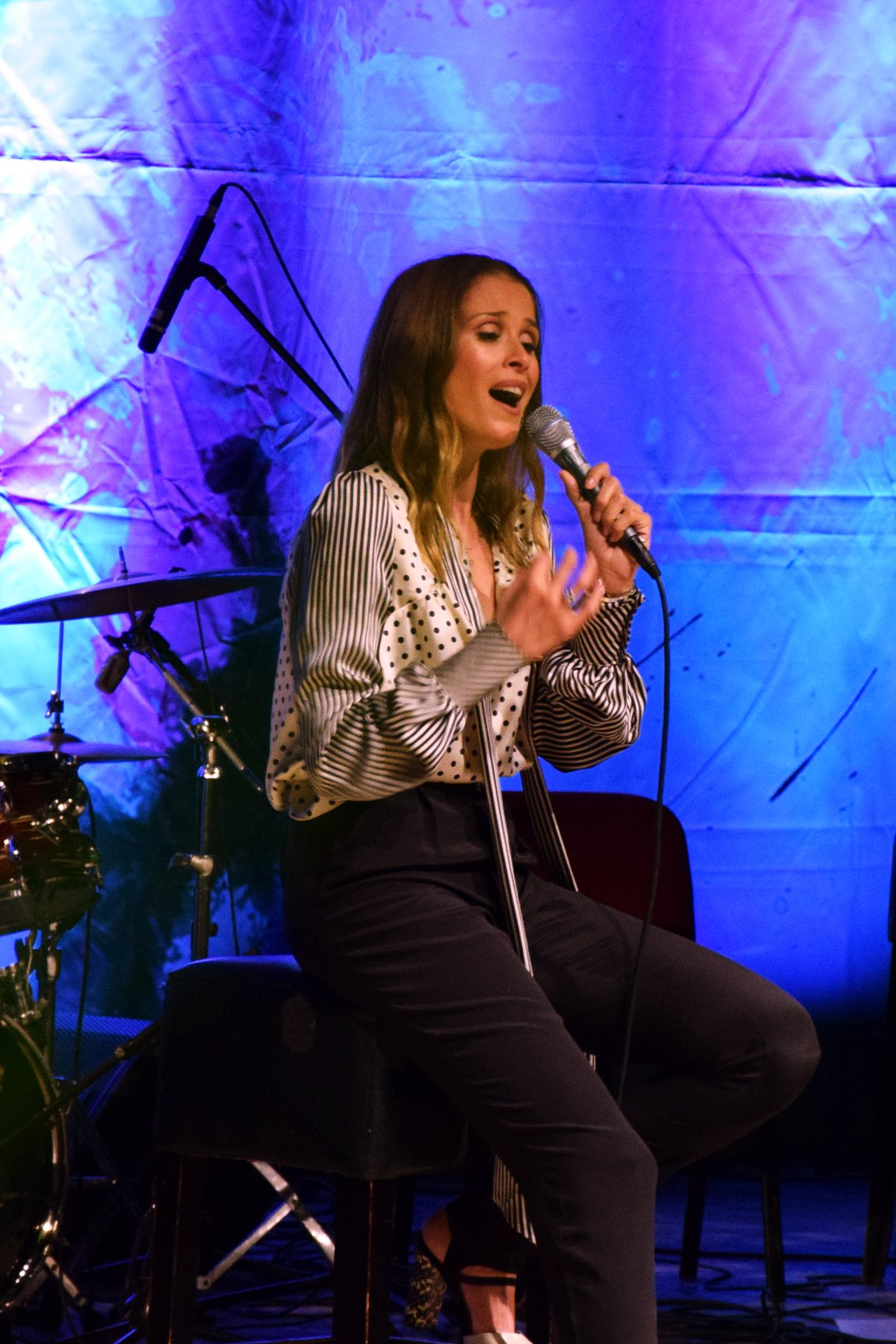
Karolina Gočeva performing during a concert in promotion of Izvor in May 2018.

=== Singles ===
"Dzvona" was released as the album's first single on 19 December 2017. It was released on the singer's official YouTube channel along with an accompanying music video directed by Ognen Shapkovski. The video shows Gocheva, accompanied by an all-female children choir singing the lyrics of the song. All of the songs were released on YouTube on the day of the album's release. "Beli cvetovi" was released as the album's second single. A music video directed by Chedo Popovski was filmed in Skopje and premiered on 31 October 2018. The video shows the singer walking, running and biking through a city while singing the lyrics of the song.

=== Tour ===
Starting on 24 February 2018, the first concert out of seven in total, in promotion of the album took place at the Macedonian Opera and Ballet (MOB) in Skopje. The set list of the two and a half hour-long concert consisted of two parts - the first half consisted only of songs from the album Izvor while the second included songs of her previous projects as well. The concert was well received by the public and Milica Džarovska of the female magazine Ženski magazin who praised the emotional vocal rendition and the warm atmosphere. Other concerts in promotion of the album took place on 25 and 26 February and 1–3 March. With this feat, the singer broke her previously held streak of five consecutive concerts in promotion of the album Makedonsko Devojče 2. In early March 2018, she held four more concerts accompanied at the Macedonian Philharmonic accompanied by the philharmonic orchestra as well as one concert accompanied by her ten-member band at the Biljanini Izvori Sports Hall in Ohrid. On 27 and 28 March, she also held two concerts at the Culture Center in Bitola. From April to May, the singer also gave concerts in Tetovo, Gostivar, Kumanovo, Štip and Strumica. On 10 And 11 August 2018, Gočeva held two more open concert at the Heraclea Lyncestis theater in Ohrid. After the promotion of the album concluded, many songs from Izvor continued being performed during the singer's live performances. This for instance, included a performance on 24 March 2024, with songs such as "Beli cvetovi" and "Da e son".

Micevski also performed an instrumental cover of "Da e son" during his concert at Macedonian Philharmony given in March 2023.

== Critical and commercial reception ==
A writer for the Croatian website Glazbeni.info praised the singer's vocals and called the album a "brilliant" pop record with swing, jazz and etno elements. Džarovska from Ženski magazin felt that the songs on the album presented a "warm and a musically rich, mature story". "Ti ne dojde" received the award for Etno/World Music Song of the Year at the 2019 Music Awards Ceremony held in Belgrade where the singer also performed it.

Izvor charted in Croatia following its release. For the week ending 13 March 2019, the album debuted and peaked at number 33 on the Croatian Albums Chart. The following three consecutive weeks, the album charted at positions 36, 37 and 35 before falling off the chart for the week ending 3 June 2019, having spent a total of four weeks on the chart.

== Track listing ==
- All songs produced by Nikola Micevski and Dejan Momirovski for XL Studio Productions.

No.	Title	Writer(s)	Length
1.	"Ubav zhivot"	Vesna Malinova; Nikola Micevski	3:47
2.	"Mladi bagremi"	Malinova; Micevski	4:21
3.	"Gazam bosa"	Malinova; Micevski	4:19
4.	"Nema pesna za mene"	Malinova; Micevski	3:58
5.	"Dzvona"	Malinova; Micevski	4:35
6.	"Beli cvetovi"	Malinova; Micevski	4:09
7.	"Da e son"	Malinova; Micevski	3:52
8.	"Zemi go srcevo"	Malinova; Micevski	4:18
9.	"Ti ne dojde"	Malinova; Micevski	4:04
10.	"Budna"	Vesna Petrushevska; Micevski	5:34
11.	"Epilog"	Micevski	4:04
Total length:			42:57

== Personnel ==
Credits adapted from the liner notes of Izvor.

- Nikola Micevski – accordion (tracks: 2, 8)
- Ljupka Arsovska – backing vocals (track: 5)
- Makedonka Petreska – backing vocals (track: 5)
- Helena Susha – backing vocals (track: 5)
- Blagojche Trajkovski – clarinet (tracks: 2, 6, 8, 9)
- Emilija Kjiproska – design
- Kiril Kuzmanov – flute (tracks: 3)
- Damjan Pejchinoski – guitar (tracks: 1, 7)
- Zoran Kostadinovski – guitar (tracks: 2, 4, 5, 6, 8, 9)
- Timko Chichakovski - qanun (tracks: 2, 9)
- Goce Domovski - kaval (tracks: 3)
- Vesna Malinova Babamova - lyrics (tracks: 1 to 9)
- Vesna Petrushevska Bejbi - lyrics (track: 10)
- Nikolchee Micevski – music, arrangement, programming, music production, piano
- Mihail Korubin – painting
- Dejan Momirovski – producer
- Zlatko Miladinovski - tambourine
- Dzhambo Agushev – trumpet (track: 6)
- Vladimir Kostov – violin (tracks: 1, 3 to 9)
- Vladimir Krstev – violin (tracks: 1, 3 to 9)
- Jasmina Dragomanska – violin (tracks: 1, 3 to 9)
- Branislav Avtovski – violin (tracks: 1, 3 to 9)
- Maja Efremova – violin (tracks: 1, 3 to 9)
- Kiril Josifov - violoncello (tracks: 2, 4)

== Charts ==
Chart (2019)	Position
Croatian Albums Chart	33
