= Duper =

Duper may refer to:

- Duper Sessions, the third album by Norwegian singer/songwriter and guitarist Sondre Lerche
- Mark Duper (born 1959), former American football wide receiver
- Super Duper (supermarket chain), now-defunct chain of super markets once prevalent in north-eastern PA, NY, and OH
- "Super Duper Love (Are You Diggin' on Me)", song by Willie "Sugar Billy" Garner, released in 1975
- Super Duper Sumos, animated series with crimefighting sumo wrestlers on an adventure and fighting using their buttocks
- Duper (band), Macedonian band established in 2018
