= Jas Imam Pesna =

Studio album by Karolina Gočeva
- Released: 2000
- Recorded: 1999–2000
- Genre: Pop
- Label: Avalon Production

Karolina Gočeva chronology
Mamo, pušti me (1991)	Jas Imam Pesna (2000)	Zošto Sonot Ima Kraj (2002)

Singles from Jas Imam Pesna
- 1. "Milenium So Tebe" Released: 1999; 2. "Sakaj Me" Released: 1999; 3. "Bez Ogled Na Se" Released: 2000; 4. "Za Nas" Released: 2000; 5. "Nemir (Duet With Toše Proeski)" Released: 2000

Jas Imam Pesna is the debut album by Macedonian pop musician, Karolina. The album was released in Macedonia and Serbia & Montenegro.

== Background ==
Following a streak of performances at different festivals and music competition, Karolina decided to take her career to a different level. In 2000, she signed a deal with the record label Avalon Production. Shortly afterwards, her debut studio album Jas Imam Pesna (lit. 'I've Got a Song') was released through the label. Three singles were released off the first album, including "Sakaj me" (lit. 'Love Me'), "Bez ogled na se" (lit. 'No Matter What') and "Nemir" (lit. 'Restlessness'), the latter of which she sang in a duet with Macedonian pop singer Toše Proeski.

== Track listings ==
1. "Sakaj Me"
2. "Bez Ogled Na Se"
3. "Milenium So Tebe"
4. "Tajna"
5. "Zasekogaš"
6. "Za Nas"
7. "Jas Imam Pesna"
8. "Srcevo Ne Ќe Izdrži"
9. "Nemir" (featuring Toše Proeski)

== Release history ==
Country	Date
Republic of Macedonia	2000
Serbia	2001

== Chart positions ==
Year	Song	Chart positions
Year	Song	Macedonia
1999	"Milenium So Tebe"	1
1999	"Sakaj Me"	1
2000	"Bez Ogled Na Se"	1
2000	"Za Nas"	2
2000	"Nemir"	1

== Awards ==
Golden Lady Bug

- The Best Female Singer Of The Year
- Album Of The Year
- Music Video Of The Year for "Bez Ogled Na Se"
