= Red and White Brand =

First store brand for grocery merchandise

Red & White
- Product type: Store Brand, National Brand Equivalent
- Current owner: Federated Group
- Country: Buffalo, NY
- Introduced: 1908
- Related brands: Hy-Top, Parade, Better-Valu
- Markets: United States
- Registered as a trademark in: United States, September 29, 1925
- Tagline: Premium Quality
- Website: fedgroup.com

Red & White was the first store brand for grocery merchandise, food products, beverages and household supplies. The brand was first launched on cans of coffee in 1908 by Smith Michael (S.M.) Flickinger in Buffalo, New York to compete with A&P and its popular private brand coffee and was named after the color on the store shelves.

The Red & White Wholesale Corporation that grew from S.M. Flickinger's first store in Buffalo, supplied groceries to independent grocery stores, and during World War I, the pressure on the small stores increased as food was rationed. By this time the company was operating as its own chain of Flickinger's retail stores, as well as the wholesale operation supplying other retailers.

Today, there are thousands of Red & White products serving as the primary store brand in independent grocery stores across the United States.

== History ==
In 1908 Smith Michael (S.M.) Flickinger developed the first store brand product, cans of coffee, to compete with A&P. Flickinger named the brand Red & White after the colors of his store shelves and the coffee was a hit. Over the course of the next ten years, a wide assortment of Red & White products was added to Flickinger's store.

By 1921, Flickinger's success had grown into a small chain of Red & White stores throughout upstate New York, Pennsylvania and Ohio, while simultaneously supplying other independent stores with Red & White products through his warehouse. This collection of Red & White stores and independent stores became the Red & White stores Voluntary Group System. Membership to the group included site selection, training, discounted store fixtures and professional window display for initial store openings to help avoid the failure of thousands of corner grocers.

Following the trademark registration for Red & White in 1925, wholesalers from Canada and the United States began visiting Buffalo to learn about the voluntary concept. Many received permission from Flickinger to set up similar operations, and they spread quickly from coast-to-coast.

As the independent Red & White stores spread throughout the United States, the “family” of stores kept in close communication through a monthly Red & White magazine that was “published in Chicago for all Red & White members everywhere.”

During the Great Depression, the independent wholesalers and approximately 6,700 retailers benefited from the ability to collaborate and volume buy the grocery store products through the Voluntary Group System.

The growing private store brand Red & White business came to an abrupt halt when the Robinson-Patman Act, the second amendment to the Clayton Antitrust Act, would no longer allow Red & White stores to price discriminate from unearned brokerage payments. As a result, Leo J. Bushey, President of Red & White Corporation, and four other employees left Red & White and formed a new organization known as Modern Marketing Services. The new organization leased “the brands, trademarks and labels owned or controlled by Red & White. Despite the separation of the two entities, the Federal Trade Commission decided that the arrangement still violated the Robinson-Patman Act, and ordered both Modern Marketing and Red & White to “cease and desist from receiving or accepting, directly or indirectly, from the sellers of such commodities, any brokerage fee. This decision was affirmed and enforced on June 13, 1945.

In 1945, Modern Marketing was dissolved and Leo J. Bushey, George O Morea and Harmon J Wright for Bushey, Morea & Wright, Inc. to “act exclusively as a seller’s broker” to solicit orders on manufacturers and packers for unbranded merchandise, merchandise packed under the labels owned by the manufacturers, including the Red & White brand. As a result, Red & White Corporation continued to own various trademarks and trade names, but did not perform any purchasing service for the wholesale grocers who owned it.

Bushey, Morea & Wright, Inc. (BM&W) purchased the Red & White trademark from Red & White Corp in 1955 and reorganized the company to compete in a “Supermarket Era” by streamlining headquarter operations while transferring many responsibilities to its member distributors. Bushey, Morea & Wright, operating out of Boston, MA, established an irrevocable trust known as The Red & White Foundation and sold the Red & White brand to the foundation for a nominal sum, while Red & White Corporation contributed all the remaining trademarks and brands to the Foundation. The Foundation granted Bushey, Morea & Wright a license to use the trademarks and trade names on a royalty basis. Bushey, Morea & Wright purchased all the outstanding shares of stock of the original Red & White Corporation and changed its own name to Red & White Corporation and took over all advertising functions for the company.

In 1963, under the leadership of Donald Albrecht, Red & White Corporation acquired National Brand Sales Corporation, which provided immediate expansion into more areas of the country with a new Hy-Top brand. Shortly thereafter the Parade and Fine Fare brands were also launched by Red & White Corporation.

To better serve schools, hospitals, restaurants and in-plant cafeterias, the Red & White Foodservice Division was formed in 1966. However, shortly after launching the new division in 1968, new FDA label regulations prompted a corporate name change to Federated Foods as the holding company, made up of six divisions: Red & White International Division, Hy-Top Products Division, National Brands Sales Division, Kitchen Products Division, and Red & White Foodservice Division.

The growing success of store brands continued beyond the 60's and 70's and in 2014 store brands represent 17% of all retail grocery sales in the United States. There are thousands of Red & White products serving as the primary store brand in independent grocery stores across the United States, but the store brand market as a whole has greatly matured.

In 1981, a New Corporate Headquarters — Federated Foods moves headquarters to Arlington Heights, Illinois. The rest of the Federated divisions joined Federated Foods at this location in 2000.

In 1993, a Logistics & Consolidation Solution - Golden Bay, Federated's consolidation and logistics division, is created to make significant operational efficiencies and supply chain cost savings by consolidating the sourcing, procurement, inventory management and distribution of a broad range of products for wholesalers and retailers.

In 1996 a Full-Service Design & Marketing Established - SailPointe Creative Group, Federated's full-service creative agency, is established to provide strategic design solutions and outstanding creativity.

== Key people ==
=== S.M. Flickinger ===
Smith Michael (S.M.) Flickinger started Red & White Corporation, the nation's first wholesale and retail business with fully integrated distribution. In 1903, Smith Michael (S.M.) Flickinger left his job as a wholesale grocery clerk in Buffalo, NY to open Flickinger Grocery Store with his brother Burt Flickinger Sr. This would be Buffalo, New York's first $1 billion company that Flickinger opened with $16,000 he had saved. Two decades later in 1926, the brothers helped co-found IGA in 1926. S.M. Flickinger died at the age of 74 in 1939. As a result, his son took over Red & White through the World War II years and into the Supermarket Era.

Burt's son, Burt Flickinger Jr., would establish the Super Duper grocery store chain after the Flickingers separated from Red & White. Burt Jr. died in 1997. Burt III works as a consultant for the grocery industry.

=== Donald Albrecht ===
In the early 1960s, Don Albrecht became majority stockholder and chairman of Federated Foods. At that time, Federated Foods was located in Park Ridge, Illinois. In the early 1980s the company relocated to its present location in Arlington Heights, IL. Today, Federated Foods operates as a division of Federated Group. At the time, the company was as much a broker as it was as a brand owner, with a variety of offerings that included — and still includes — the now-iconic Red & White brand, created in 1908 by S.M. Flickinger.

As one who helped shape the grocery industry into what it is today, Albrecht was a man who valued simple solutions and easy-to-execute programs. He also understood the economic, political and technological changes taking place throughout his career. He knew that during a time of when food prices were on the rise, he had to eliminate every frill from the “Red & White Corporation” to promise the lowest possible cost of Red & White products to Federated's customers. The brand was a hit. And Albrecht realized soon after that if Federated owned more brands, then it could grow and, at the same time, help grocers who desired a private label program but lacked the capacity to develop one. So throughout the 1960s, Federated acquired the Hy-Top and Parade brands under Albrecht's leadership.

Albrecht saw an opportunity to further drive retailer and wholesaler customers’ sales by offering them no-name opening-price-point products. Within six weeks of recognizing this opportunity, Federated was offering more than 30 of these products to their customers.

Albrecht died in August 1986 at the age of 58. At the time of his death, he was board chairman at Federated, according to his obituary in the Chicago Tribune. He also served as a trustee of Harper College in Palatine, Illinois. and was a member of the Board of Directors of Willow Creek Community Church in South Barrington, IL.

== See also ==
- Red & White (food stores)
