= Nikola Micevski =

Macedonian instrumentalist and composer

- Никола Мицевски
- Born: Bitola, SR Macedonia, SFR Yugoslavia
- Occupations: Composer; instrumentalist; musician; producer
- Spouse: Beti
- Children: 2

Nikola Micevski is a Macedonian composer, instrumentalist, musician and producer. Micevski was born in Bitola, SR Macedonia, SFR Yugoslavia. In the span of his almost twenty-year long career, Micevski has collaborated with numerous Macedonian artists and singers, including Karolina Gočeva, Next Time, Dani Dimitrovska and others. In 2023, he released his first studio album New Era preceded by three singles: "Circle", "Time" and "Impulse". He is considered the most famous Macedonia composer and musician of contemporary times.

== Career ==
=== 2010-2021: production work ===
Micevski served as the arranger and producer of several songs on Naum Petreski's studio album Odi zvezdo (2010), including the title song and "Žal za Despina". He also worked on albums by Ljubojna, Gjorgji Krstevski and Nune Brothers.

He is best known as being the arranged and producer of the highly successful ethno jazz albums Makedonsko Devojče 2 (2014) and Izvor (2018) by Karolina Gočeva. He also appeared as a keyboardist with her on the tour held in promotion of the albums in North Macedonia and Serbia. In addition to that, he also collaborated with Macedonian rock band Next Time on their successful cover versions of Macedonian folk songs, including "Ja izlezi Gjurgjo".

=== 2021-2023: New Era ===
Since 2021, he has released three original singles from his first studio album New Era (2023) released through Avalon production. The album contains a mix of several genres, including rock, pop, ethno and score music. In April 2021, his first original instrumental composition, titled "Circle/Krug" was released along with a music video directed by Daniel Joveski. Speaking about its conception, Micevski shared how he wanted to put his life experience in it. He shared, "life is a 'circle'... filled with many things. Every new beginning is the same as the previous, but every time the experience (the rock) is bigger and it takes us to the summit of what we want to have and achieve!". The song was recorded at XL Studio by Dejan Momirovski. The following year, he released two songs, "Time" featuring Damjan Pejcinoski and "Impulse" in 2022. He also promoted the album by giving several concerts while accompanied by 40 musicians and Marina Korunovska's choir Ars Nova; on 10 December 2022, he gave a concert in his home city of Bitola and on 21 March 2023 concert in Skopje at the Macedonian Philharmony.

On 21 March 2022, he collaborated with Macedonian singer Dani Dimitrovska to cover traditional Macedonian song "Dejgidi, ludi, mladi godini" as part of a musical project of ethno and jazz style. He served as the arranger and producer of the song, while also playing the piano. The duo had covered the traditional songs "Karanfilo filfilo mome" and "Belo lice ljubam jas" on 19 May and 9 June 2021, respectively.

=== Junior Eurovision Song Contest ===
His song "Idnata Jas", composed by himself and written by Ilcho Nechovski, will represent North Macedonia at the Junior Eurovision Song Contest 2026, where it will be performed by Ana Stojanoska. The contest is set to be held in Ta' Qali, Malta, on 24 October 2026.

== Artistry ==
He himself classifies his genre as world music and a mixture of several genres. It has also been described as a mixture of Macedonian folk and traditional music mixed with Western influences through jazz, funk and World music.

== Private life ==
Micevski is married to Beti whom he has two daughters with. He is also known as Nikolče or as the music human.
