= Duke Bojadziev =

Macedonian musician

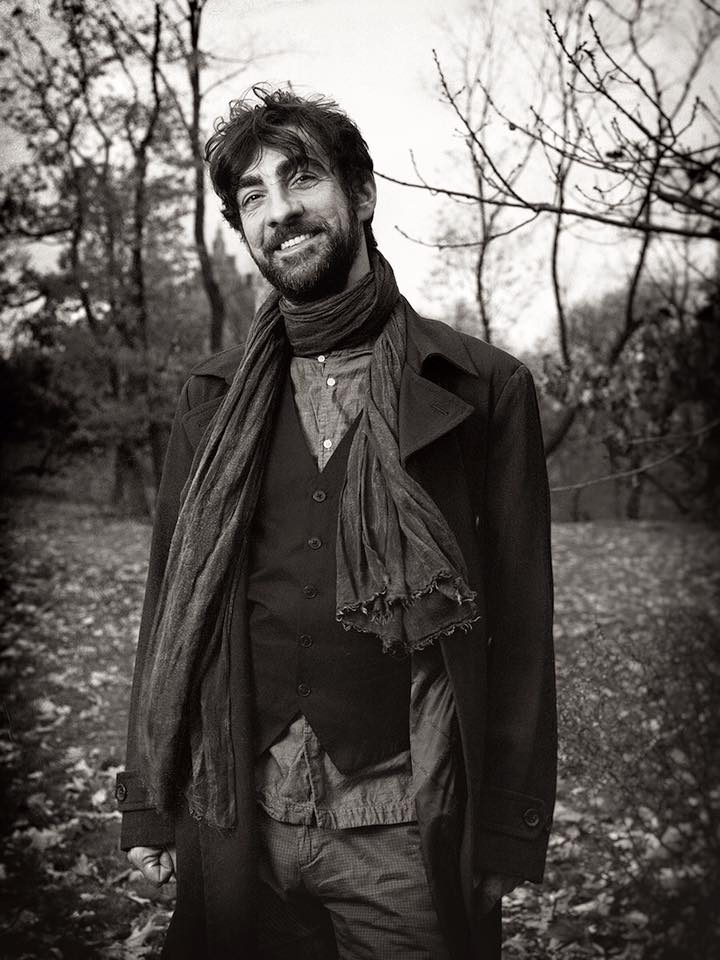

Background information
- Also known as: Duke B
- Born: September 24, 1972 (age 52); Skopje, SR Macedonia, SFR Yugoslavia (present-day North Macedonia)
- Genres: Film score; World; Lounge
- Occupation(s): composer, record producer, pianist
- Instrument: Piano
- Years active: 2001–present
- Website: www.dukeb.com

Duke Bojadziev (Macedonian: Дуке Бојаџиев, romanized: Duke Bojadžiev, pronounced ['dukɛ bɔja'd͡ʒiɛv] born 24 September 1972) is a Macedonian composer, record producer and pianist, who lives in New York City.

== Biography ==
Duke Bojadziev showed interest in music at a young age. He played piano from the age of three and first composed when he was ten years old. Taking after his father, who balanced successful careers in both music and medicine, Duke earned his medical degree and then moved in Boston, to attend Berklee College of Music. Upon graduating in 2001, he moved to New York City.

Duke Bojadziev worked as producer and composer for oscar-winning film directors Jonathan Demme and Danis Tanovic, as well as oscar-nominee Stole Popov on his last movie To the Hilt. From 2005 he was two and a half years music director and pianist for The Citizens Band. He worked on global advertising campaigns for Peugeot, Mercedes, L’Oréal, Lancôme and Anna Sui. Duke Bojadziev has produced remixes for Cyndi Lauper and the Blue Man Group, and honed his inventive style through performances with various ensembles at NYC's Carnegie Hall, Highline Ballroom, Cipriani Ballroom, The Box, Drom NYC, Art Basel in Miami, The Avalon Theater in Los Angeles and Ohrid's Summer Festival.

Duke starts with concerts in 2011, in collaboration with Macedonian Filcharmonic Orchestra, Tanja Carovska, Karolina Gočeva and other names of music world. On 8 October 2015 in Carnegie Hall he has concert with Chamber Orchestra.

Duke has released seven albums, and had his music featured on world-renowned CD compilations as Buddha Bar XIV, Chill Out In Paris, and Marrakech Express. On 8 November 2022, it was announced through a press release by Avalon Production, that an album titled Pesni za Ljubov i Kopnež, which is a collaborative project by Bojadziev, Karolina Gočeva and Ismail Lumanovski would be promoted through a concert at the Macedonian Philharmonic on 23 December 2022. The following day, the album is expected to be released through all digital platforms in North Macedonia.

== Experience ==
=== Film ===
- Do Balchak - by Stole Popov
- The Secret Life of Walter Mitty - Ben Stiller
- Fear of falling - by Jonathan Demme
- Dreaming American - by Lee Percy
- The War is over - by Mitko Panov
- Wingless – by Ivo Trajkov
- The Ten – by Ken Marino and David Wain
- Shadows – by Milcho Manchevski
- Hell – by Danis Tanovic
- Suffering Man's Charity – by Alan Cumming
- Shortcut to Nirvana – by Nick Day
- Sweetbreads (short) – by Noora Niskanen
- Nuts (short) – by Andre Lyon

=== TV ===
- Martha Stewart
- Moment of Luxury
- Guiding Light

=== Advertising ===
Duke Bojadziev worked on global advertising campaigns for: Mercedes, Chrysler, L’ancome, L’oreal, Maybelline, Anna Sui, Cuervo, Crest, Peugeot, Verizon.

=== Multimedia and web ===
- FontaineBleau Hotels
- Vera Wang
- GE
- W hotels
- Vanity Fair
- Cosmopolitan

=== Discography ===
- New York a.m.
- The War is Over (soundtrack)
- Love is The Way
- Stream of Consciousness (solo piano)
- Digital Confessions 2
- Digital Confessions
- Esma's Dream
- Pesni za Ljubov i Kopnež (2022)

=== CD compilations ===
- Buddha Bar XIV
- Chill Out in Paris 4, 5 & 7
- Airfrance
- Fashion Week 5
- Marrakech Express 2
- Diesel_U_Music
- Styled in Italy
- Papeete Beach Lounge
- La Suite 6
- Ram Cafe 4
- KU DE TA 4
