= Pesni za Ljubov i Kopnež =

Studio album by Karolina Gočeva, Duke Bojadziev and Ismail Lumanovski
- Released: 24 December 2022
- Recorded: 2020–2022
- Studio: Studio XL
- Genre: Pop
- Length: 49:47
- Language: Macedonian
- Label: Avalon Production

Karolina Gočeva chronology
Izvor (2018)	Pesni za Ljubov i Kopnež (2022)

Duke Bojadziev chronology
KU DE TA 4	Pesni za Ljubov i Kopnež (2022)

Ismail Lumanovski chronology
Pesni za Ljubov i Kopnež (2022)

Singles from Pesni za Ljubov i Kopnež
- 1. "Idila" Released: 19 December 2017

Pesni za Ljubov i Kopnež (in Macedonian Cyrillic: Песни за љубов и копнеж, English translation: Songs of Love and Longing) is the first collaborative studio album by Macedonian singer Karolina Gočeva featuring Macedonian musician and producer Duke Bojadziev and Macedonian-American clarinetist Ismail Lumanovski. The album was released on 24 December 2022 through Avalon Production. A brief documentary film featuring footage of its recording was broadcast on 17 December 2022 on the national TV channel MRT 1.

Work on a collaborative project by the trio began in 2019 and due to delays related to the COVID-19 pandemic continued into early 2021 when most of the recording and production was finalized. The album was intended as a compilation of some "neglected" pop songs from the "Macedonian golden era in pop music" which includes the 1960s, 1970s and 1980s. "Idila" was released as the album's lead single on 2 June 2021 along with an accompanying music video. Five concerts were held in promotion of the album and took place at the Macedonian Filharmonic on 23-25 December 2022 in Skopje.

== Background and production ==
Following a regional tour held in promotion of her ninth studio album Izvor, Gočeva took a brief hiatus from the music industry without releasing new music, mostly due to the COVID-19 pandemic and the measures taken against it. In 2019, Gočeva moved to New York City where she spent time singing and playing the piano with Duke Bojadziev, a Macedonian composer and pianist and Ismail Lumanovski, a Macedonian-American clarinetists. Gočeva had previously collaborated with Duke Bojadziev in 2016, when the two performed the song "Prazno e bez ovaa ljubov", written by Duke's deceased father Todor Bojadzhiev at the Metropolis Arena in Skopje; after the performance, they conceived the idea behind working on a collaborative project. Despite their initial plans to release an album in 2020, the project had to be postponed due to the COVID-19 pandemic. In the period from 2020 to 2021, Gočeva continued working on the tenth studio album.

During interviews, Gočeva revealed that the album would include reworks of 11 Macedonian songs, from the 1950s, 1960s, and 1970s, a period which was considered to be the "golden era of Macedonian pop music". Songs selected for the album were mostly "neglected during the years" and were written by songwriters such Dragan Gjakonovski Shpato, Dimitar Masevski, Todor Bojadzhiev and Ljubomir Brangjolica among others. Most of the album was recorded at the Macedonian Filharmonic in January 2021; the trio spent two days rehearsing and two days recording due to time constraints and other pandemic-related restrictions.

== Release ==
On 17 December 2022, a brief documentary film, which featured footage of the recording of Pesni za Ljubov i Kopnež and interviews with the three artists was broadcast on the national TV channel MRT 1. The album was made available for streaming on Gočeva's official YouTube channel on 23 December 2022.

== Promotion ==
"Idila" was released as the album's first single on 2 June 2021 along with an accompanying music video. The song, which was originally composed by Dragan Gjakonovski - Shpato, featured Duke Bojadžiev on piano and Ismail Limanovski on keyboard.

The first concert in promotion of the album scheduled to take place on 23 December 2022 was announced through a press release by Avalon Production on 8 November 2022. As the first concert announced was sold out, a second one was also scheduled for the following day; all tickets for the second concert were also sold out in 35 minutes. A third date was also announced on 25 December 2022. In total, five concerts in promotion of the album were held of which two took place on 24 December and two on 25 December. In a concert review for Nezavisen Vesnik, L.S. felt that the concerts inspired emotions of love into the audience and considered them a remarkable event in the city.

== Track listing ==
No.	Title	Writer(s)	Composer(s)	Length
1.	"Bliska, a Sepak Dalecna"	Blagoja Stefanovski	Ljubomir Brangjolica	4:33
2.	"Idila"	Gjoko Georgiev	Dragan Gjakonovski - Shpato	3:29
3.	"Vo Edna Prolet"	Dimitar Masevski	Gjoko Georgiev	3:34
4.	"Ne Me Zapiraj"	Jane Kodzabashija	Todor Bojadzhiev	4:48
5.	"Na Ovoj Den"	Gjoko Georgiev	Ljubomir Brangjolica	5:21
6.	"Ni Na Na"	Jane Kodzabashija	Todor Bojadzhiev	4:30
7.	"Ezero Moe"	Gjoko Georgiev	Ljubomir Brangjolica	4:49
8.	"Za Nas Pochnuva Zivot"	Gjoko Georgiev	Dragan Gjakonovski - Shpato	5:06
9.	"Prispivna Za Rekata"	Gjoko Georgiev	Dimitar Masevski	4:44
10.	"Posledna Solza"	Gjoko Georgiev	Dimimtar Masevski	4:47
11.	"Prazno E Bez Ovaa Ljubov"	Gjoko Georgiev	Todor Bojadzhiev	4:08
Total length:				49:47
