= Makedonsko Devojče (album) =

Studio album by Karolina Gočeva
- Released: 26 June 2008
- Recorded: January–May 2008
- Studio: Enterprise Studios (Skopje)
- Genre: Ethno music; world music; folk music
- Length: 48:32
- Language: Macedonian
- Label: Avalon Production
- Producer: Valentino Skenderovski; Zlatko Origjanski

Karolina Gočeva chronology
Vo Zaborav (2005)	Makedonsko Devojče (2008)	Kapka Pod Neboto (2010)

Singles from Makedonsko devojče
- 1. "Ptico malečka" Released: May 2008; 2. "Za kogo?" Released: June 2008

Makedonsko Devojče (Macedonian: Македонско девојче, in English meaning: Macedonian Girl) is the fifth studio album by Macedonian singer Karolina Gočeva released in North Macedonia on 26 June 2008 through Avalon Production. The record label City Records released the album in ex-Yugoslavian countries in December of the same year. The composer of all the songs and the main lyricist is Zlatko Origjanski, a member of the Macedonian band Anastasia. Two singles were released to promote the album: "Ptico malečka" and "Za kogo?". Sonically, the album marks the singer's first attempt at an album that is rooted in traditional Macedonian music in an attempt to broaden her musical style. Makedonsko Devojče was the best-selling album in the country during the year of its release. The album's popularity and success prompted Gočeva to release a sequel, titled Makedonsko Devojče 2 (2014). Songs from the album have become an important part of the singer's career and are currently incorporated in set list of her live performances.

== Background ==
Following the release of her album Vo Zaborav (2004) and its corresponding Serbo-Croatian rework (2005), Gočeva decided to depart from her predominantly pop musical style and orient herself towards songs inspired by Macedonian traditional music. According to the singer, Makedonsko Devojče initially served only as an experimental piece of work, with the singer attempting to broaden her musical style. Macedonian musician and member of the band Anastasia was contacted to work on Makedonsko Devojče. During an interview, Gočeva described the album as "typically feminine" due to the songs's melancholic lyrics with which "every woman who has been disappointed in her life" can identify.

The album consists of ten songs from which nine are original compositions entirely written by Origjanski and one, namely "Jas sum nesrekjnica" is a rearranged cover version of a traditional Macedonian song. The album was entirely recorded by Valentino Skenderovski at Enterprise Studios in Skopje between January and May 2008. "Ptico malečka" was released as the album's first single in North Macedonia. Songs from the album were promoted during the singer's live performances in various towns in North Macedonia; for instance she performed the song "Prolet, leto, esen" from the album during a concert in Kriva Palanka on 24 March 2024.

== Reception and impact ==
In 2008, the album won in the category for Best Ethno Album at the Sunčane skale festival, an awards show for Balkan music. In 2008, the album became the best-selling album of that year in Macedonia. According to an interview with Gočeva in 2014, it took several years for the public to start "accepting" the album, but she observed that its impact on the audience lasted long after its release. In retrospect, she felt that her approach to Makedonsko Devojče was slightly less confident than her later projects due to her relatively younger age and lack of experience. The singer explained that although the songs were inspired by Macedonian traditional folk music, her interpretation of them was not a folk one, but rather a more authentic and personal rendering.

Due to the success achieved with Makedonsko Devojče and the public's demand to continue performing similar songs, the singer decided to record a sequel in 2014. The sequel album is titled Makedonsko Devojče 2 and was released on 25 February 2014 in North Macedonia. (Note: Following the release of Makedonsko Devojče 2, Makedonsko Devojče (2008) started being referred to as Makedonsko Devojče 1. Both albums were considered part of a single project known collectively as Makedonsko Devojče.) The second album achieved similar success, being acclaimed by Macedonian music critics and becoming the best-selling album in the country in the year of its release. It was promoted through numerous concerts in North Macedonia and Serbia in 2014 and 2015, during which songs from Makedonsko Devojče 1 were also performed. In 2015, when asked about her future projects and whether she would return to recording pop music as she did before the release of music inspired by Macedonian folklore as in Makedonsko Devojče 1 and Makedonsko Devojče 2 or she would continue in the same direction as those two albums, Gočeva said that "there is no reason why I would not make one more project like that". In 2018, the singer released the album Izvor, following the same sound rooted in Macedonian traditional music; numerous songs from the album Makedonsko Devojče 1 were performed as part of the promotional concerts for that album.

== Track listing ==
No.	Title	Writer(s)	Length
1.	"Za kogo?"	Zlatko Origjanski	6:30
2.	"Makedonska partizanska"	Origjanski	4:55
3.	"Ptico malečka"	Origjanski	5:29
4.	"Prolet, leto, esen, zima"	Origjanski	4:59
5.	"Ti, zlatno sonce"	Origjanski	3:59
6.	"Skopska magla"	Origjanski	5:13
7.	"Jas sum nesrekjnica"	N/A^{[a]}	4:04
8.	"Ruža, ružica"	Origjanski	4:43
9.	"Dojde vreme, dojde"	Origjanski	4:14
10.	"Aj beše maj"	Origjanski	4:26
Total length:			48:32

Footnotes

- ^{^[a]}No information is available about the writing credits for "Jas sum nesrekjnica" as it is a folklore song

== Personnel ==
Credits adapted from the liner notes of Makedonsko Devojče.

- Duško Božinovski – accordion
- Zlatko Origjanski – arrangement, acoustic guitar, electric guitar, songwriting
- Ivan Bejkov – bass
- Blagojče Trajkovski – clarinet
- Sašo Tatarčev – mandola, arrangement
- Jane Dunimagloski – mandolin
- Trajče Mitrovski – mandolin
- Bojan Trajkovski – acoustic guitar
- Petar Hristov - tenor saxophone
- Boban Milošeski – executive production
- Daniel Milošeski – executive production
- Aleksandar Sekulovski – percussion
- Dino Milosavljević – drums
- Dejan Panovski – photography
- Valentino Skenderovski – recording, audio mastering, production, organ
