= Kapka Pod Neboto =

Studio album by Karolina Gočeva
- Released: 29 November 2010
- Studio: Long Play (Sarajevo); BMA (Skopje); Ku-Ku Band (Sofia)
- Genre: Pop; electronic
- Length: 43:41
- Language: Macedonian
- Label: Avalon Production
- Producer: Vesna Malinova; Maja Sar; Bertan Arslani; Miroslav Kostadinov

Karolina Gočeva chronology
Makedonsko Devojče (2008)	Kapka Pod Neboto (2010)	Makedonsko Devojče 2 (2014)

Singles from Kapka Pod Neboto
- 1. "Kapka Pod Neboto"; 2. "Ne Se Vrakaš"; 3. "Kraj"; 4. "Za godina dve"

Kapka Pod Neboto (Macedonian: Капка под небото, English: A Drop Under the Sky) is the sixth studio album by Macedonian singer Karolina Gočeva released in North Macedonia on 29 November 2010 through Avalon Production. The Serbian language edition of the album, titled Kap Ispod Neba was released that same year in Serbia. The album was largely written and produced by Vesna Malinova, Maja Sar, Mahir Sarihodžić and Miroslav Kostadinov. Four singles were released to promote the album: "Kapka Pod Neboto", "Ne Se Vrakaš" (English: You Will Not Return), "Kraj" (English: The End) featuring Serbian rapper Wikluh Sky and "Za Godina Dve" (English: In a Year or Two).

Several songs of the album gained popularity among the Macedonian audience and are currently incorporated in set lists of the singer's live performances.

== Background ==
The album was mostly recorded in three locations: Long Play in Sarajevo, BMA in Skopje and Ku-Ku Band in Sofija. Musically, the album is a pop record that is in line with the sound Gočeva demonstrated in her previous releases.

On 6 March 2010, Gočeva gave a brief interview to Sky Net Television in which she revealed details about the album. She described it conceptually as lists of songs which are intertwined and connected to each other. The songs were written by authors from North Macedonia, Bulgaria, Serbia and Bosnia and Herzegovina.

== Singles and promotion ==
The lead single of the album, titled "Kraj" featuring Serbian R&B and hip hop artist Wikluh Sky was released in May 2009; it gained high popularity on radio charts in The Republic of Macedonia. Gočeva also performed the single at the opening ceremony of Big Brother Serbia. A music video showing Karolina singing the song to the camera with her clothes wet in water was released on 5 July 2009.

The second single off the album, "Za Godina, Dve" (Serbian: Uspomene na Tebe), was released in December 2009; lyrically it is a power ballad about ending a relationship. The song became an instant radio hit in The Republic of Macedonia and was promoted on the Serbian TV show Sve Za Ljubav and on the semi-final of VIP Veliki Brat. Its songwriter, Maya Sar, was inspired to write the song from her own life story. A music video for the song, which according to the singer "makes it even sadder", was released for further promotion.

On 28 April 2011, Karolina gave an acoustic performance of three singles from the album as part of an MTV Express concert given at a bus in Skopje: "Kapka pod neboto", "Za godina, dve" and "Ne se vrakas".

== Track listing ==
Kapka Pod Neboto – Macedonian edition
No.	Title	Writer(s)	Producer(s)	Length
1.	"Ne Se Vrakaš"	Bertan Arslani; Vesna Malinova	Daniel Kajmakoski	3:23
2.	"Ne Čuvstvuvam Strav"	Maja Sar; Malinova	Marija Šerifović	3:33
3.	"Kapka Pod Neboto"		Malinova; Darko Tasev; Mahir Sarihodžić	4:43
4.	"Sama"	Sar; Malinova	Sar; Sarihodžić	3:51
5.	"Site Tie Dni" (featuring Deep Zone Project)	Miroslav Kostadinov; Malinova	Kostadinov	3:45
6.	"Me Ljubiš Li Ti"	Sarihodžić; Elena Terleeva	Malinova	3:55
7.	"Kraj" (featuring Wikluh Sky)	Malinova	Đorđe Miljenović	3:35
8.	"Boi"	Malinova	Evgeni Dimitrov; Sarihodžić	3:53
9.	"Za Godina-Dve"	Sar; Malinova	Sar	4:09
10.	"Da Možev Da Te Poglednam"	Malinova	Dimitrov	4:30
11.	"Kapka Pod Neboto" (Acoustic mix)	Malinova	Sarihodžić	4:24
Total length:				43:41

Kap Ispod Neba – Serbian edition
No.	Title	Writer(s)	Producer(s)	Length
1.	"Više Se Ne Vraćaš"	Bertan Asllani; Vesna Malinova	Daniel Kajmakoski
2.	"Put Za Nigde"	Sar; Malinova	Šerifović
3.	"Kap Ispod Neba"	Malinova	Malinova; Tasev; Sarihodžić
4.	"Sama"	Sar; Malinova	Sar; Sarihodžić
5.	"Uspomena na Tebe"	Miroslav Kostadinov; Malinova	Kostadinov
6.	"Kraj"	Sarihodžić; Elena Terleeva	Malinova
7.	"Sve Ovo Vreme" (Deep Zone Remix)	Malinova; Miroslav Kostadinov	Sarihodžić
8.	"Boje"	Malinova	Dimitrov; Sar
9.	"Želim Samo Tebe"	Sar; Malinova	Sar
10.	"Volela Sam Te"	Malinova	Ku-Ku Band; Dimitrov
11.	"Kap Ispod Neba" (Acoustic mix)	Malinova	Sarihodžić
