= Makedonsko Devojče 2 =

Studio album by Karolina Gočeva
- Released: 25 February 2014
- Recorded: 2012–2013
- Studio: XL
- Genres: Macedonian folk music; pop; jazz; ethno-jazz
- Length: 48:25
- Language: Macedonian
- Label: Avalon Production
- Producer: Dejan Momirovski

Karolina Gočeva chronology
Kapka Pod Neboto (2010)	Makedonsko Devojče 2 (2014)	Izvor (2018)

Singles from Makedonsko Devojče 2
- 1. "Čalgiska" Released: December 2013; 2. "Dve liri (ne ni bilo pišano)" Released: January 2014; 3. "Koj da mi zapee" Released: April 2015

Makedonsko Devojče 2 (in Macedonian Cyrillic: Македонско девојче 2, meaning in English: Macedonian Girl 2) is the eighth studio album by Macedonian singer Karolina Gočeva released on 25 February 2014. Avalon Production launched the album in Macedonia, while Croatian label Dallas Records released it throughout former Yugoslav countries in April 2015. The album consists of eight original songs written by Valentin Soklevski and Vesna Malinova; the arrangement and production were completed by Nikola Micevski and Dejan Momirovski. Except for those eight songs, two cover versions are also included, one of them being of a Macedonian traditional song and the other one of a record originally performed by Macedonian singer Pepi Baftirovski. For Gočeva, the motivation to record the album came from the critical and commercial success of her previous project inspired by the Macedonian traditional music, Makedonsko Devojče (2008).

The project's finalization lasted for two years due to the intention of the team behind it to improve it as much as possible. According to Gočeva and the producer Micevski, the group's members' acquaintance with each other helped them in setting the right musical direction with the recording of Makedonsko Devojče 2. Musically, the album is similar to its predecessor; the songs are characterized by elements of Macedonian traditional music, but are adapted to a modern style which is contemporary at the time of the release of the album, thus intertwining pop and jazz elements. The lyrics cover emotional states of sadness, happiness, love and longing experienced by a mellow woman. The songs were written and composed specifically for Gočeva, taking into account her wide vocal range and musical versatility; all of them are sung without using any backing vocals.

Macedonian music critics commended the album with its blend of traditional and mainstream music being particularly lauded. It also achieved wide commercial success becoming the best-selling album of 2014 in Macedonia. Three singles were released from Makedonsko Devojče 2: the song "Čalgiska" premiered on 6 December 2013 before the album's release, "Dve liri (ne ni bilo pišano)" was released in January 2014 and "Koj da mi zapee" was released as a single in April 2015, being sent to radio stations in Macedonia and the other ex-Yugoslav countries. To promote Makedonsko Devojče 2, Gočeva held concerts across different cities in Macedonia before and after the release of the album. Most of them were recorded and broadcast on various TV shows in the country and were uploaded and shared on the singer's social media and YouTube accounts. In 2015, the album was also promoted in Serbia.

== Background ==
In 2008, Gočeva released the album Makedonsko Devojče in collaboration with Macedonian composer Zlatko Origjanski. The album features elements of Macedonian traditional music and it represented a change in the musical style for the singer. According to Gočeva, the album served as an experimental work for her in order to establish whether she would be able to successfully record folk music. Makedonsko Devojče turned out to be a commercial and critical success, becoming the best-selling album in Macedonia in the year of its release and receiving the award for Best World Music Album at the 2008 Sunčane Skale festival in Montenegro. Its popularity among the Macedonian public lasted for several years after its release.

After her audience's demand to continue performing similar songs, Gočeva decided to record a second album in the same musical direction. Makedonsko Devojče 2 is a successor to the album released in 2008 and it contains songs composed in the vein of Macedonian folklore. The plans to record the album were revealed by Gočeva during an interview in May 2012 with the magazine Naš Svet, confirming that she had already begun with the song selection process for the track listing of the second edition of the project Makedonsko Devojče. (Note: Following the release of Makedonsko Devojče 2, the first album released under the name Makedonsko Devojče (2008) started being referred to as Makedonsko Devojče 1. Both albums were considered part of a project known simply as Makedonsko Devojče.) In the initial stages of the album's development, Makedonsko Devojče 2 served only as a working title and later became its official title in order to emphasize that the musical style is the same as that of Makedonsko Devojče (2008).

A team of renown Macedonian musicians was responsible for handling the instrumentation and arrangement of the songs from the album; some of the most influential ones include Olver Josifoski from the music group Ljubojna, Zoran Kostadinovski from Kabadajas, Boško Mangarovski from Chalgija Sound System and Goce Uzunski from Synthesis. The album contains eight original songs written and composed by Nikola Micevski, Valentin Soklevski and Vesna Malinova. The songwriters took into account that their songs are specifically written to be performed by Gočeva, thus trying to make them fitting for her broad vocal range and adaptable musical performance, which can range different music genres. Two cover versions are also included on the album; the first one, "Te vidov i se zaljubiv" is a Macedonian traditional song and the second one, "Ako zgrešam neka izgoram", was originally sung by Pepi Baftiroski and written by Mile and Gjorgji Barbarovski.

== Recording and development ==
For this album, she created a new singing style, it is neither a pop, nor a folk performance, and yet it is still something splendid.

— Micevski describing the vocal performance on Makedonsko Devojče 2

The work on the album lasted for two years, due to the group working behind it paying attention to details and trying to record the best possible version of the material at hand, at the same time maintaining slow-paced progress. The work on the album began in 2012; after the songs were written, Micevski recorded demo versions and sent them to Gočeva. After she listened to them, the singer started a song selection process, choosing the most fitting ones among the numerous that were written for her. She decided recording and including ten songs on the track listing of her new album. Makedonsko Devojče 2 was recorded at studio XL by Dejan Momirovski in Skopje. During an interview with the portal IdiVidi, Gočeva explained that the group working on the album consisted of her long-time professional acquaintances, thus rendering the process of working with them easy and pleasant due to the presence of an "excellent atmosphere". The long-time collaboration and the previous experiences they have had together served as a lesson for attaining perfection, making Gočeva more self-confident and determined in taking a specific direction with the album. During an interview on the TV show Carpe diem on the TV channel Alsat-M in February 2014, Gočeva called the album her best work she had published yet. The maturity she had gained throughout her career served as an inspiration of "modernizing the traditional"; Gočeva said that the Macedonian folklore is something existing in the blood of the Macedonian people and added that her album was not characterized by typical traditional songs but rather songs drawing inspiration from that kind of music. Through the new tracks, she allowed her musical performance to stand out and leave a certain long-lasting contribution to Macedonian contemporary music. The singer also acknowledged that the music she had recorded for the album was not popular on a worldwide scale, but emphasized that the sound is more authentic for Macedonia as compared to other mainstream popular genres across the world such as hip hop, pop and R&B.

Micevski, the album's producer, is also one of the people who had had a long-time professional relationship with the singer and who had contributed for the arrangement of the songs included on Makedonsko Devojče (2008); the start of the professional ties with Gočeva began when he joined her live band which performed during her concerts in the past. He said that due to the mutual understanding between the two of them, the process of setting a music direction with the album was without any difficulties, but moved slowly because of their intention to create high quality material. During an interview with the journal Republika, Micevski said that his work on Makedonsko Devojče 2 represented both responsibility and pressure to a certain extent. He elaborated that the requirement with the album was to create something that would resemble the first project, but will not be identical to it and would maintain the same level of quality or even surpass it. He added: "To me, that represented a big challenge and maybe a life chance to express myself differently, uniquely, with a different mark, with all my knowledge and spirit. It was an additional pleasure working with my close friend and collaborator Dejan Momirovski... In the end we all managed to do what we had had in mind." Micevski also revealed that the songs included on the album were originally custom-made for Gočeva, adapted to her vocal capabilities and musical maturity, adding that she is a "world performer" and a singer who can sing in different styles: "She can simply find her way anywhere and she does it on a very high level. The mark she left on the material of 'Makedonsko Devojče 1 and 2' is a really unique, original style of performance which leaves traces in the history of Macedonian vocal-instrumental music."

== Composition and lyrics ==
According to Gočeva, the album was meant to incorporate ethno jazz music in addition to the prominent elements of Macedonian folklore. Critics also noted elements of pop and jazz in the songs and viewed the music as an internationalization of the sound of traditional Macedonian folklore. The lyrics cover several themes with the song's motives revolving around the states of happiness, sadness, love and longing of a mature female protagonist. Instrumentally, the songs on Makedonsko Devojče 2 contain the following instruments: clarinet, bass guitar, horn, acoustic guitar, violin, qanun, saxophone and percussion.

The album opens with the seven-minute song "Koj da mi zapee" (English: Who shall sing to me) which expresses the grief experienced by a woman who has recently lost her beloved love interest who used to sing to her while they were together. The song's title and the lyrics "Žedna sum, žedna za poj" (English: I am thirsty, I am thirsty for a song) and "„[E]h što mi beše srceto živo, eh što si imav so nego život" (English: Oh how alive my heart was, oh what a life I had with him) illustrate feelings of longing, and sadness for her lost love and youth. The journalist Bečković described it as a "classic in the new Macedonian čalgija“. The second song from the album is "Čalgija" which incorporates rhyme throughout its verses and features prominent elements of čalgija, a Macedonian music genre. "Vezi, vezi" (English: Sew, sew), the third song of Makedonsko Devojče 2 is an elegy for Macedonian migrant workers. "Sakam da ne te sakam" (English: I want to not love you) speaks of an adulterous lover and is sung from the perspective of the female protagonist. She dedicates the song to her love interest so that he realizes she was "the one who loved him sincerely". "Smej mi se, smej“ (English: Laugh to me, laugh) features and čalgija elements.

"Dve liri (ne ni bilo pišano)" (English: Two lire (It was not written for us)) is a song dedicated to a woman's past lover. Her grandmother has requested that the protagonist play the song during her wedding. Although the grandmother has died without hearing the song at her granddaughter's wedding, the latter fulfills the former's wish by paying two lire to request a song from the band playing music at the wedding of her ex-lover at which she is partaking as an invitee. "Ke pijam ljubov do kraj" (English: I will drink love until the end) has joyful lyrics about love and according to Bečković, it is musically similar to the playful rhythm typical of bossa nova as Gočeva is accompanied by fast horns and a double bass. In the song, the female protagonist sings about a "blazing kiss". The song "Son" (English: Dream) contains a "fairy tale-like" atmosphere. It describes a "fleeting beauty once we open our eyes" and how real life is different from a dream, as portrayed in the lyrics "Pusta ostana želba nevina, son si mina i ti si zamina... Ne znam koj e kriv, Bože daj mi zdiv" (English: My innocent wish remained unfulfilled, my dream has ended and you left... I don't know whose fault it is, oh God give me breath). The cover versions of "Te vidov i se zaljubiv" (English: I saw you and I fell in love) and "Ako zgrešam neka izgoram" (English: May I burn if I make a mistake) are characterized by arrangements which differ significantly from the original versions and rhythmically match the overall sound of the album.

== Release and promotion ==
On 24 February 2014, a six-minute sampler of the album containing short excerpts of all ten songs was published on Gočeva's official YouTube account. The following day, the album was released in all the major shopping centers in Macedonia. All songs were available on Spotify and each of them was published with an accompanying lyric video on Gočeva's official YouTube account in the last days of February and the beginning of March. On 16 April 2014, the album was available for digital purchase through iTunes Store. On 26 April 2015, the album was physically released in all ex-Yugoslavian countries (Serbia, Croatia, Montenegro, Bosnia and Herzegovina and Slovenia) through the Croatian record label Dallas records. It was one of the first albums in Macedonian released in ex-Yugoslavian countries after a longer period of time.

=== Live performances in Macedonia ===
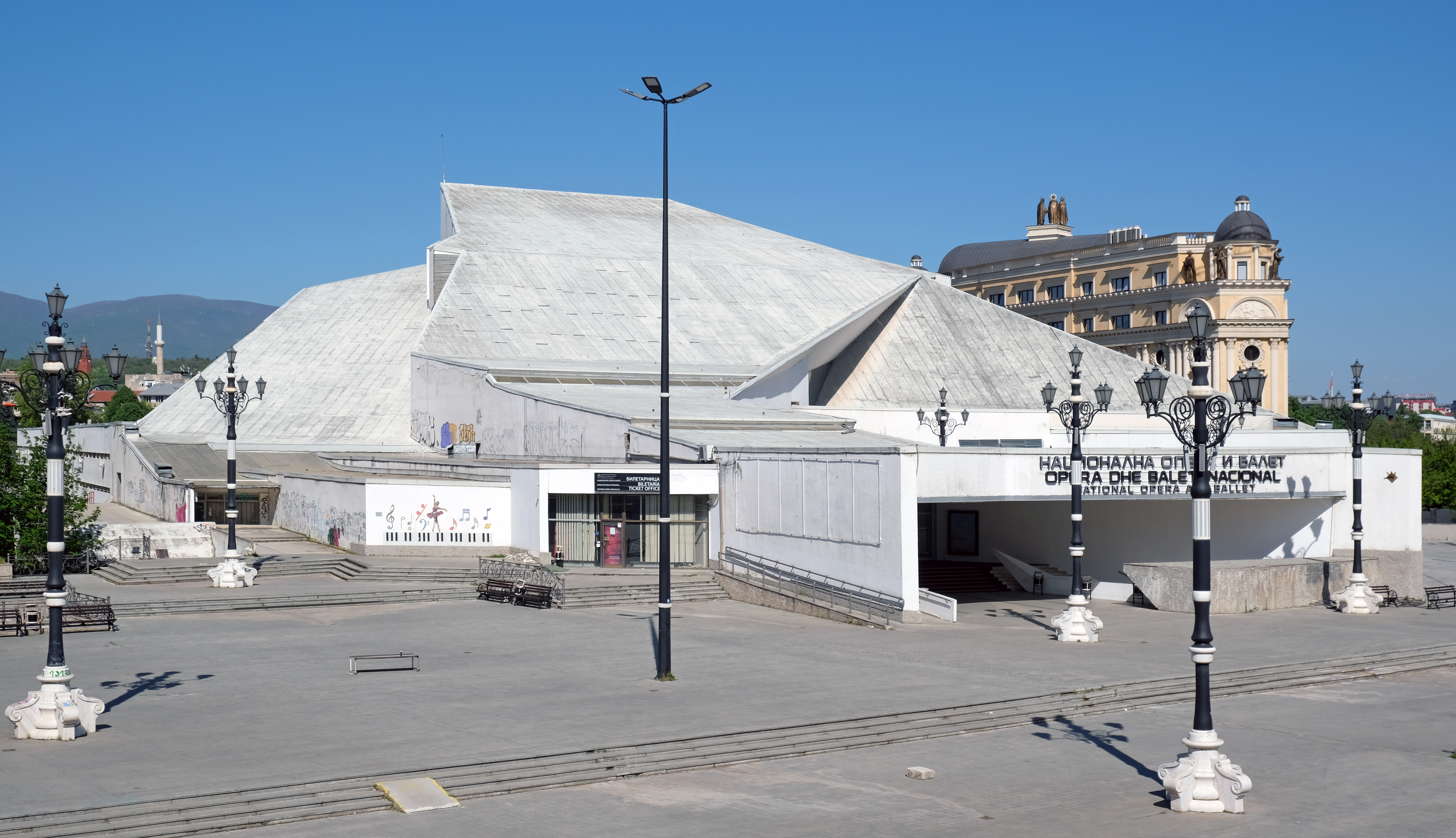
An image of the building of the Macedonian Opera and Ballet in Skopje where Gočeva held five consecutive concerts to promote Makedonsko Devojče 2

From 20 to 24 February, Gočeva held five concerts at the Macedonian Opera and Ballet (MOB) during which she performed songs from Makedonsko Devojče 2 live for the first time. The concertgoers were the first to receive copies of the album along with their tickets which were put on sale on 9 December 2013. In 2014, 15,000 tickets were sold for Gočeva's concerts in Skopje. In January 2014, a listening party for the album was held at the club XO in Skopje on which Gočeva was also present; the event represented the first of such kind in Macedonia and according to Gočeva, the inspiration for it came from a similar trend popular across the world where the artist and the team working behind the album listen to the full final version of the project together with a group of fans and music journalists.

On 17 February 2014, Gočeva appeared on the event MRT za Najdobrite (MRT for the Best) which celebrated the existence of the Macedonian radio and television. On the show, she performed her song "Dve liri (ne ni bilo pišano)" and was dressed in traditional Macedonian attire. On 21 March 2014, Macedonian Radio Television (MRT) broadcast a full performance filmed during one of the concerts where she sang various songs from Makedonsko Devojče 2 and its predecessor. On 12 November, the same year, Gočeva sang "Koj da mi zapee" at Skopje Fest at the Universal Hall and an official recording of the performance was uploaded on her YouTube account two days later. On 13 December 2014, at the Boris Trajkovski Sports Center in Skopje, Gočeva held one more concert organized by Avalon Production. At this concert, along with the tickets, concertgoers received a DVD which contained recordings filmed during the singer's shows at the MOB.

During the summer of 2015, Gočeva embarked on a small tour in which she promoted the two albums from the project Makedonsko Devojče. The concerts took place in Bitola at Heraclea Lyncestis on 23 July, in Ohrid at the Ancient Theatre of Ohrid on 24 July and in Dojran at a city park on 2 August. The singer also performed in Prilep at the Pivo Fest festival on 15 July 2016, where she sang numerous songs from the album. In 2015, Gočeva explained in an interview that performing at the concerts where she sang songs from Makedonsko Devojče 2 was a challenge for her due to the great vocal effort she had to put and the lack of background vocals during the live performances. She also revealed that a band of ten musicians was specifically assembled to perform the music from the album live; it consisted of several Macedonian music academics who accompanied her on-stage.

Songs from the album continued to be a part of the set list of the singer's concerts held later in the 2010s and in the 2020s. Just as an example, on 24 March 2024, Gočeva held her first concert in the town of Kriva Palanka where she predominantly performed songs from Makedonsko Devojče 2 and Izvor in addition to her older hits; these included "Sakam da ne te sakam" and "Ako zgresham neka izgoram".

=== Promotion in Serbia ===
In 2015, Gočeva started promoting the album in Serbia. On 29 May, she appeared on the sixth season of the TV show Veče sa Ivanom Ivanovićem where she sat down for an interview and later performed "Koj da mi zapee" and "Smej mi se smej" from the album as well as "Begaj, begaj" which was a new song published after the album's release. According to Nielsen, the episode on which the singer appeared was viewed by approximately million people in Serbia. On 8 June, Gočeva appeared on the fourth week of the Balkan talent show X Factor Adria and performed "Koj da mi zapee". On 11 July, she performed at the Exit Festival in Novi Sad with songs from Makedonsko Devojče 1 and Makedonsko Devojče 2. In the beginning of November, the singer appeared on the news on the Serbian TV channel N1 and on the TV show Dobro Jutro - Jovana & Srdjan on RTV Pink where she gave an interview about the album and her upcoming concert in Belgrade. On 7 November, the singer held a concert at the Ilija M. Kolarac Endowment in Belgrade where she performed songs from both albums to the Serbian audience. Gočeva was accompanied by Nikola Micevski on piano and harmonica, Blagojče Trajkovski on clarinet, Blagoja Antovski on percussion, Zoran Kostadinovski and Vladimir Čadikovski on guitar, Vladimir Krstev on violin, Martin Josifovski on bass guitar and Džambo Agušev as a special guest performed on horn. On 14 February 2017, the singer's performance on the Serbian TV show Tri boje zvuka was broadcast on the channel Radio Television of Serbia; Gočeva performed three songs from the album: "Koj da mi zapee", "Smej mi se smej" and "Ke pijam ljubov do kraj". On 26 June 2015, the singer promoted the album with a concert on the Balkan Boemi Festival in Bansko, Bulgaria.

=== Singles ===
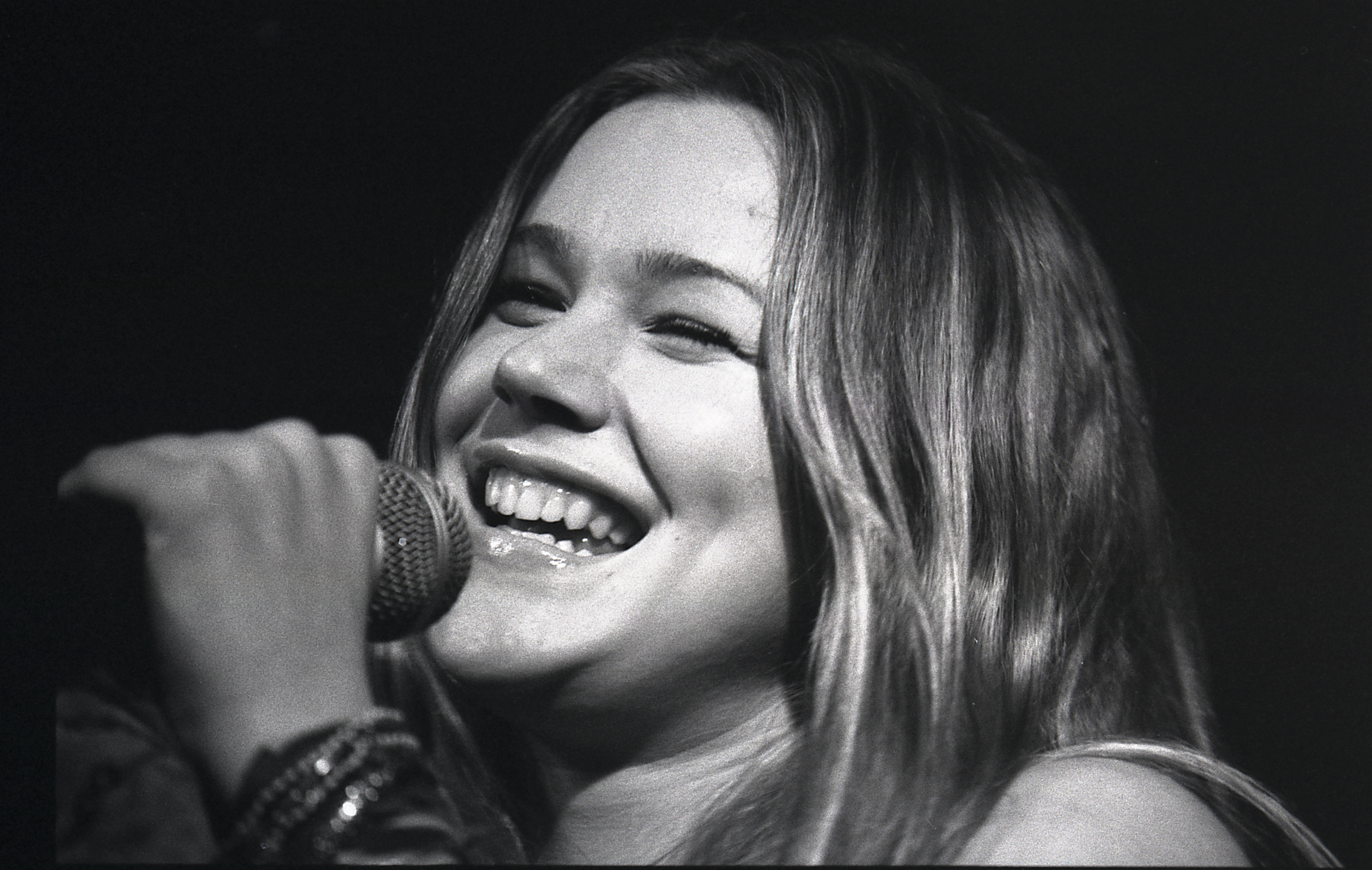
English singer Joss Stone (pictured) covered "Koj da mi zapee" together with Gočeva in 2016 during her visit to Skopje, Macedonia.

The song "Čalgiska" was released as the first single from the album. It was released on 6 December 2013 on the singer's official Facebook profile and on that of Avalon Production. "Dve liri (ne ni bilo pišano)" was released as a single in Macedonia on 13 January 2014. The lyrics video of the song is the most-viewed video on the singer's YouTube account with more than 6 million views as of 2019. The song "Koj da mi zapee" was released as the album's third single in April 2015 and was sent to radio stations in Macedonian cities and countries of ex-Yugoslavia.

In October 2016, English singer Joss Stone contacted Avalon Production, requesting to sing "Koj da mi zapee" together with Gočeva at a park in Skopje. The idea for the performance came from a series of videos that Stone filmed during her visits to various countries as part of her Total World Tour embarked in 2014. Before visiting the countries where she was scheduled to perform, Stone used YouTube to identify the most representative and popular songs and chose her favorite one. Stone had rehearsed the song before coming to Skopje and improvised along with Gočeva in order to bring specificity to the melody. A professionally recorded video of the performance was published on the official YouTube accounts of both Stone and Gočeva on 18 October 2016. The video starts with Gočeva explaining to Stone the meaning behind some of the lyrics of the song; afterwards they sing it together accompanied by live musicians in the background.

== Reception ==
"In the end - after the first, after the sixth listen of this extraordinarily good album... I have the same feeling. For a long time, no one has ever sung about sadness as it is sung during these ca. 50 minutes. The Macedonian answer to the world's best-seller Buena Vista Social Club. There is sadness, longing and passion, rhythms and pain all in one place. More tears than laughter... Different styles, unified in the single Macedonian čalgija. A melting pot of different musical colors and genres. I put my hat down to the musicians. Well done! I will not even try to describe Karolina's voice. I will not even get started on the emotions she brings to every word[...] "

— Bečković in his review of Makedonsko Devojče 2.

Before its release, the album was sent to music critic Ivan Bečković who listened to it and wrote a review for the website Macedonian Music Net. According to him, the album was a logical step in the singer's career after the success of Makedonsko Devojče (2008). He noted how both albums exhibit the "perfect combination - city music sang in a magical manner by a city girl". He noted that the lyrics of the songs were genuine and leave an impression of being someone's real past experiences, thus showcasing the singer's intention to leave a long-lasting project behind her. He added how "leaning to her internal instincts and needs, she elevates her power and spirituality to a higher level". Bečković also thought that the album's uniqueness lies in its combination of various musical elements which distinguish it from classical Macedonian čalgija. He concluded his review, observing that at the very beginning of 2014, the Macedonian music scene had already received its album of the year.

In an article published in Radio Slobodna Evropa, Ljupčo Jolevski called the album "magical and multilayered... an accomplishment which has an instant likability, but which you discover with each next listen". Jolevski praised the team responsible for the arrangement and the instrumentation for their efforts to give their best in the album's songs. He described the sound of Makedonsko Devojče 2 as a mixture of Macedonian folklore and the "ocean of worldwide sounds". According to Jolevski, the album elevates to an "amazing collection of songs which defy the ugliness of rhythms and simple lyrics which we are splashed with on a daily basis". At the end of his article, Jolevski concluded that Gočeva has reached her musical zenith and the brightest point of her career with the album characteristic of her hometown, Bitola. He concluded that the album "brings the sounds and customs of the Old Bazaar of Bitola, the city that even nowadays somehow resists the turbo-attacks from all sides".

Writing for the portal Vistina, Maja Bećković credited the singer for conveying "so much warmth, so many emotions" in an album; she called "every word - a new pearl, every verse - gold, every vocal - a shining diamond". She continued describing the songs as "so authentic, so old, so archaic and yet, so modern and rich, both production and author-wise". The journalist observed that the lyrics were carefully selected with every track eligible for "a compilation containing the best lyric songs from this region, which contains so many centuries of elegy and sadness, interwoven with rare moments of joy, which make life worth living". She credited the singer for adding even more value to what already was valuable material arranged for the album and concluded, "All in all, Macedonian girl will touch your heart and spirit even for the second time".

According to Avalon Production, Makedonsko Devojče 2 was the best-selling album in Macedonia in the year of its release. The songs were well received by the concertgoers in Macedonia and Serbia and were among the audience's favorites later on. During an interview with the television channel N1, Gočeva revealed that all the songs had become evergreens in Macedonia. When asked about her future projects and whether she would return to recording pop music as she did before the release of music inspired by Macedonian folklore as in Makedonsko Devojče 1 and Makedonsko Devojče 2 or she would continue in the same direction as those two albums, Gočeva said that "there is no reason why I would not make one more project like that".

== Track listing ==
No.	Title	Writer(s)	Length
1.	"Кoj da mi zapee"	Vesna Malinova	7:06
2.	"Čalgiska"	Valentin Soklevski	4:05
3.	"Vezi, vezi"	Soklevski	4:27
4.	"Sakam da ne te sakam"	Soklevski	4:38
5.	"Smej mi se smej"	Malinova	3:59
6.	"Dve liri (ne ni bilo pišano)"	Soklevski	4:29
7.	"Ke pijam ljubov do kraj"	Soklevski	4:38
8.	"Son"	Soklevski	4:36
9.	"Te vidov i se zaljubiv"	N/A^{[a]}	5:28
10.	"Ako zgrešam neka izgoram"	Mile Barbarovski; Gjorgji Barbarovski^{[b]}	5:09
Total length:			48:25

Notes

- Nikola Micevski was responsible for the music and arrangement of all the songs on the album.
- Dejan Momirovski serves as a producer on all songs from the album.

Footnotes

- ^{^[a]}There is no information about the writing credits for "Te vidov i se zaljubiv" as that is a traditional song.
- ^{^[b]}"Ako zgrešam neka izgoram" is a cover version of a song originally recorded by musician Pepi Baftirovski and is posthumously sung in his honor.

== Personnel ==
Credits adapted from the liner notes of Makedonsko Devojče 2.

- Nikola Micevski – arrangement, accordion, keyboards, music production
- Blagojče Trajkovski – clarinet
- Oliver Josifovski – contrabass
- Nina Gavrovska – design
- Blagoja Antovski – drums
- Zoran Kostadinovski – guitar
- Goce Uzunski – percussions
- Zoran Ristevski – drums, percussions
- Boško Mangarovski – qanun
- Valentin Soklevski – lyrics (tracks: 2, 3, 4, 6, 7, 8)
- Nikola Micevski – music (tracks: 1 to 8)
- Caci Pakovska – photography
- Darko Moraitov – photography
- Filip Nikolovski – photography
- Dejan Momirovski – music production
- Stefan Tasevski – sopranino saxophone
- Boban Milošeski – supervision
- Daniel Milošeski – supervision
- Džambo Agušev – trumpet
- Vlatko Krstev – violin
