= Karolina Gočeva =

Macedonian singer

- Каролина Гочева
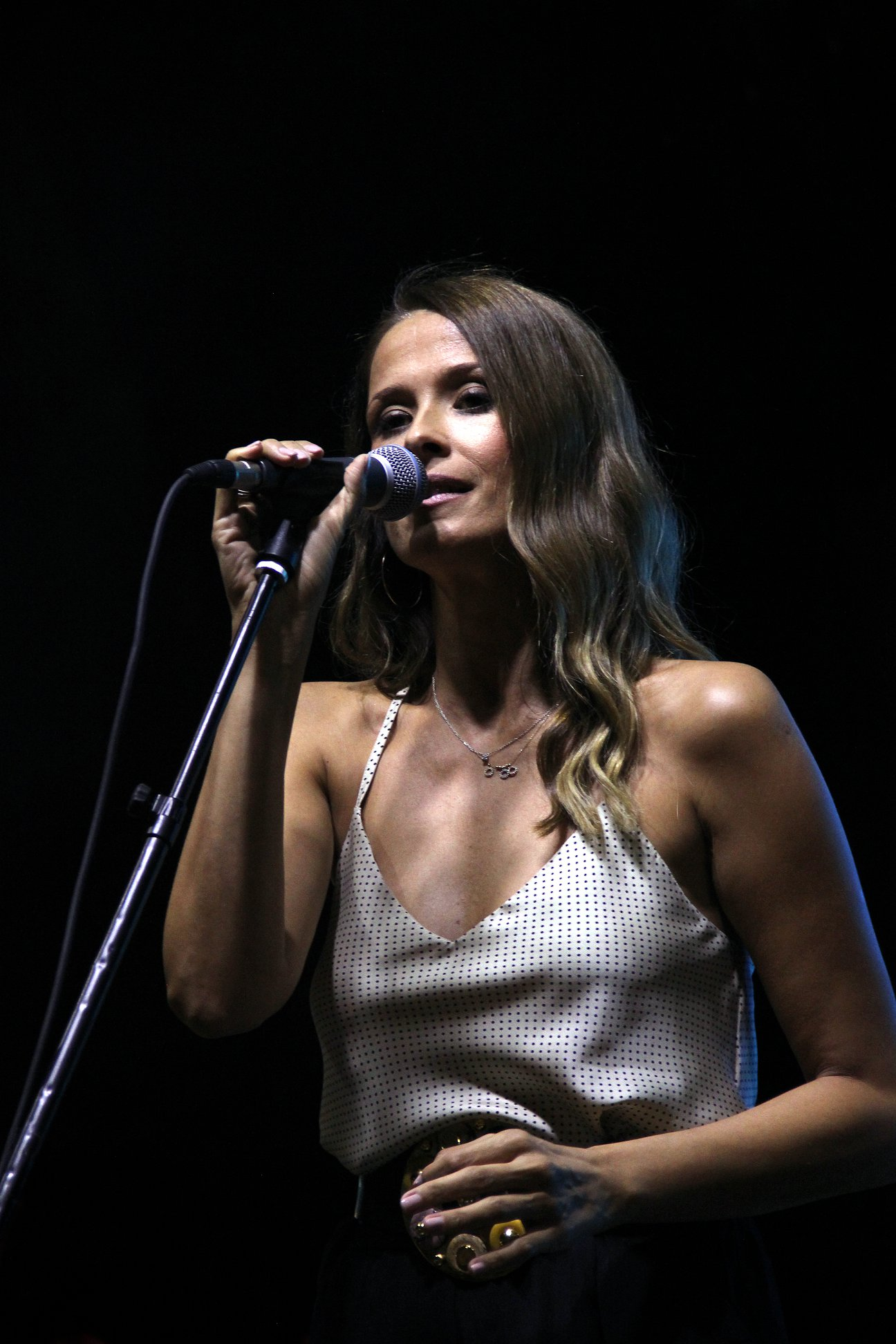
- Gočeva performing in 2018
- Born: 28 April 1980 (age 46); Bitola, SR Macedonia, SFR Yugoslavia
- Other name: Karolina
- Occupation: Singer
- Years active: 1991–present
- Spouse: Mihail Korubin (m. 2017)
- Musical career
- Genres: Pop; folk and ethno; rock; jazz; disco
- Instruments: Vocals; piano
- Label: Avalon Production

Karolina Gočeva (Macedonian: Каролина Гочева, pronounced [karɔˈlina ˈɡɔtʃɛva]; born 28 April 1980), sometimes credited as Karolina Gocheva or known mononymously as Karolina, is a Macedonian singer. She launched her music career in 1991 with a performance at a local children's show and continued participating in the following years, receiving recognition for her talent. In 1992, she released her first children album titled Mamo, pušti me (English: Mom, let me go). She signed a contract with the record label Avalon Production in 2000.

Gočeva's discography consists of nine studio albums in total, spanning pop, R&B, rock, traditional folk and ethno, jazz and world musical styles. Shortly after signing her contract with Avalon Production, Gočeva released her debut studio album Jas Imam Pesna, which included the song "Nemir" featuring Toše Proeski. Her second, third, and fourth studio albums – Zošto Sonot Ima Kraj, Znaeš Kolku Vredam, and Vo Zaborav – were released in 2002, 2003, and 2005, respectively. Although Gočeva's initial five albums were more pop, R&B and rock-oriented, her later records Makedonsko Devojče (lit. 'Macedonian Girl') (2008), Makedonsko Devojče 2 (2014) and Izvor (lit. 'Spring') (2018) incorporated elements of Macedonian traditional music and jazz. This switch in sound led to increased popularity, wide acclaim from the public, and sold-out concerts in North Macedonia, Serbia, and Bulgaria. Her ninth studio album featuring Duke Bojadziev and Ismail Lumanovski, titled Pesni za Ljubov i Kopnež, was released on 24 December 2022. A studio album with preceded by singles "Od nebo do dno" and "Daj na sunce" was released at the end of 2024.

Gočeva represented Macedonia in the Eurovision Song Contests 2002 and 2007, ranking 19th and 14th, respectively. She has received numerous awards and accolades both in North Macedonia as well as other Balkan award ceremonies. Gočeva is widely known as the most famous Macedonian female pop singer and has received the label "Macedonian pop princess/queen" and a "pop diva". Although most of her songs are sung in Macedonian, she has also released records in Serbian and English leading to an increase in popularity in Bulgaria and ex-Yugoslav countries – the latter including Serbia, Bosnia and Herzegovina, Montenegro, and Croatia. Gočeva is also renowned for her casual fashion style, for which she frequently collaborates with Caci Pakoska. With her music work, Gočeva has also taken part in campaigns against drug use, uterine cancer and gender-related violence.

== Life and career ==
=== 1980–1998: Early life and career beginnings ===
Karolina Gočeva was born on 28 April 1980 in Bitola, in then Socialist Republic of Macedonia, part of the Socialist Federal Republic of Yugoslavia to an anesthesiologist father and a technologist mother. She also has a younger sister, Aleksandra, who is an ophthalmologist. Gočeva finished her primary school in Bitola, where she also performed in a child choir. After that, she went to the high school Josip Broz-Tito in Bitola. As she had an interest in learning foreign languages, she finished her studies in the English language at the Blaže Koneski Faculty of Philology, part of Ss. Cyril and Methodius University of Skopje.

Gočeva made her music debut at the age of nine when she performed "Like a Prayer" by Madonna in Šaram Baram at the Pionerski dom in Bitola. At the age of ten in 1990, Gočeva got her first breakthrough when she performed at the first broadcast of the children's festival "Si-Do" in Bitola. A few months later, Gočeva participated with another ballad where she won the prize for Best Interpretation. She also participated in the annual festival "Makfest 91" in Štip with the song "Mamo, pušti me" (lit. 'Mum, let me go'), written by Tode Novačevski, where she won the award for Most Successful Debut. As her music career was still in its bud, she used national festivals to promote her voice and talent. In 1992, she released her first children studio album under MRT, which contained 11 other songs in addition to "Mamo, pušti me", including "Stefane" (lit. 'Stephan'), "Sekade si ti" (lit. 'You Are Everywhere'), "Prviot baknež" (lit. 'The First Kiss'), "Dojdi vo školo" (lit. 'Come to School'), "Volšebni sonuvanja" (lit. 'Magical Dreaming'), "Čujte sega" (lit. 'Listen Now'), "Dzvezdo moja" (lit. 'My Star'), "Nasmevni se narode" (English: Smile Folks) and "Strašni planovi" (lit. 'Scary Plans').

In 1993, Gočeva performed the song "Zamrznato srce" (lit. 'Frozen Heart') at Makfest which was broadcast on MTV. The music was written by Kocev, the lyrics by Nejasmić while the arrangement was finalized by Skenderovski. For the performance, Gočeva appeared dressed in a green shirt. Gočeva became a regular participant at Skopje Fest, a contest for the selection of the Macedonian entry for the Eurovision Song Contest, debuting in 1994 with a performance of "Koj da ti kaže" (lit. 'Whom Can I Tell You to?'). In 1995, she performed "Kako da te otkačam" (lit. 'How Do I Get Rid of You?'). In the following years, she continued participating successfully including in 1996, with the song "Ma, ajde kaži mi" (lit. 'Come on. Tell Me.') – music by Cvetanovski, lyrics by Micevski and arrangement by Konstantinov – which finished ninth place. In 1997, she performed the song "Tonovi tajni" (lit. 'Secret tones'), written by Kire Kostov, at Skopje '97 which was broadcast on MTV. In 1998, she participated with "Ukradeni noќi" (lit. 'Stolen Night') which was successful, reaching fourth place with 10,454 televotes. Regarding her early career during a 2023 interview, she revealed that gaining traction was something that took place in a stepwise fashion through festival performances that the Macedonian discography had to offer at the time.

=== 2000–2002: Jas Imam Pesna, Zošto Sonot Ima Kraj and Eurovision Song Contest (ESC) 2002 ===
In 2000, she signed a deal with the record label Avalon Production. Shortly afterwards, her debut studio album Jas Imam Pesna (lit. 'I've Got a Song') was released through the label. Three singles were released off the first album, including "Sakaj me" (lit. 'Love Me'), "Bez ogled na se" (lit. 'No Matter What') and "Nemir" (lit. 'Restlessness'), the latter of which she sang in a duet with Macedonian pop singer Toše Proeski. Following the release of her first studio album, she took part in the Macedonian Eurovision Song Contest. Gočeva's entry "Za nas" (lit. 'For Us') written and composed by Darko Dimitrov, landed at second place, with 916 points.

After promotion through concerts and festivals, she released her second studio album Zošto Sonot Ima Kraj (lit. 'Why Does the Dream End?') in 2002. The album contained eleven new songs in Macedonian and three songs in English. In 2001, she gained wider regional popularity in the countries of former-Yugoslavia, by placing third at the Sunčane Skale festival held on 12, 13 and 14 July in Herceg Novi with the song "Kaži mi" (lit. 'Tell Me'), written by Peri and Franc from the band Nokaut. She released "Ti možeš" (lit. 'You Can') and "Ke bide se vo red" (lit. 'Everything Will Be Okay') as singles from the album in Macedonia. On her album, she included three English versions of her songs: "I'm Looking for Jamaica", "You Could", and "Tell Me". In 2002, Gočeva was crowned the winner of Skopje Fest 2002 with her entry "Od nas zavisi" (lit. 'It Depends on Us'), which allowed her to represent the Republic of Macedonia to a European audience. At the Eurovision Song Contest 2002, she placed 19th. During the performance, she appeared donning a red dress and a golden corsette designed by Aleksandar Nošpal which gained popularity through the years. She was also nominated for Miss Eurovision 2002. She appeared on the 2002 Sunčane Skale event, performing her song "Kad voliš", which was also included on the album of the event.

=== 2003–2007: Znaeš Kolku Vredam, Vo Zaborav and ESC 2007 ===
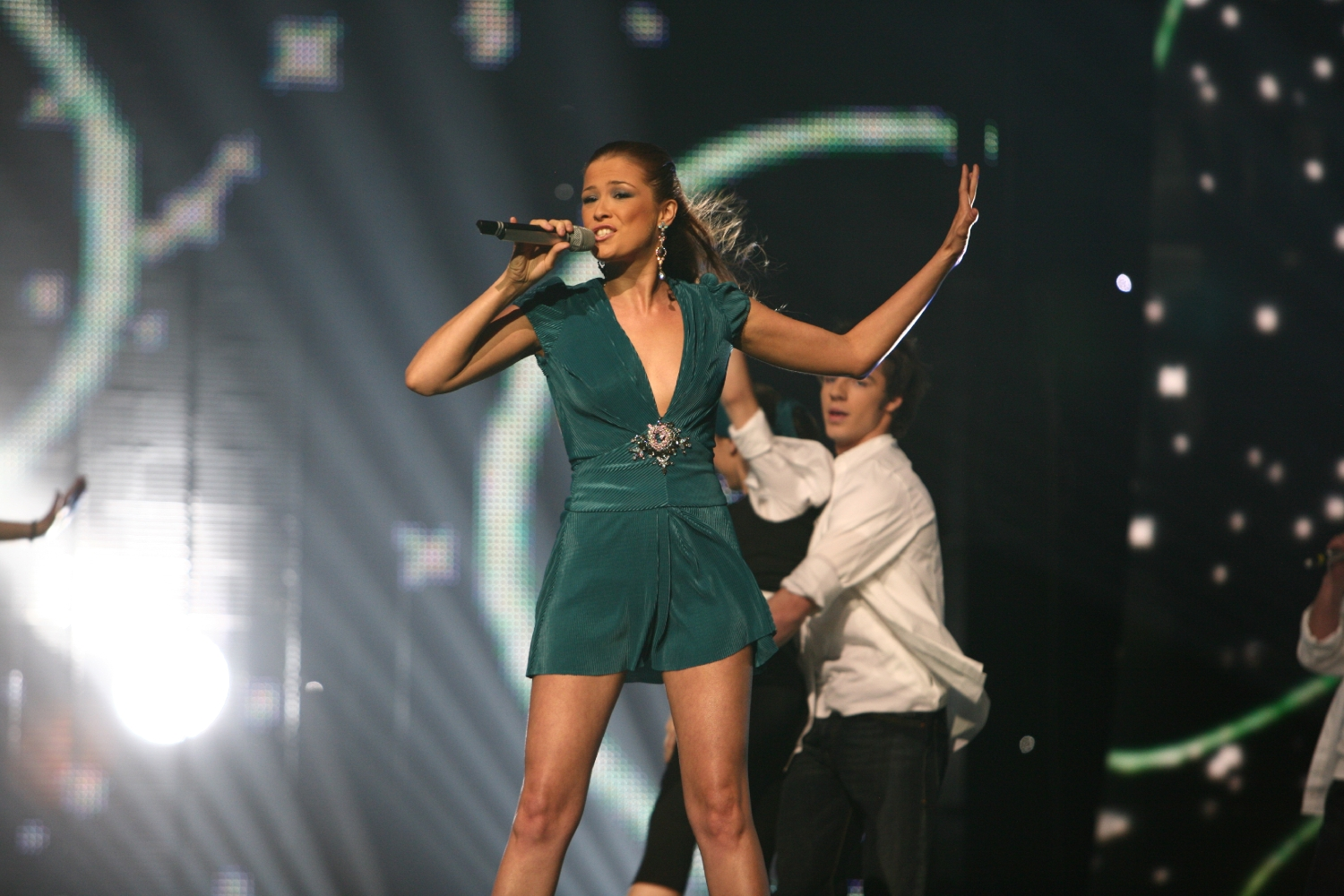
Gočeva performing the song "Mojot svet", Macedonia's entry at the Eurovision Song Contest 2007 in Helsinki.

In March 2003, Gočeva released her third studio album Znaeš Kolku Vredam (lit. 'You Know What I'm Worth'). She released music videos for her songs "Hipokrit" (lit. 'Hypocrite'), "Ljubov pod oblacite" (lit. 'Love Under the Clouds'), and "Sreščemo se opet" (lit. 'We Will Meet Again'). After 2003, her career expanded to former Yugoslav countries Serbia, Montenegro, Bosnia and Herzegovina, Croatia, and Slovenia, where her albums started being released. Wanting to appeal to the wider audience from those countries, Gočeva recorded songs from her third album in Serbian. Her first Serbian-language album and fifth overall was titled Kad zvezde nam se sklope... kao nekada (lit. 'When Our Stars Align... Like Once Before'); the title song became a success in both Serbia and North Macedonia. In 2004, she appeared on the Pink TV show Novogodišnja Citymania, where she performed the song "Noć".

In 2005, Gočeva participated once again in Herceg Novi at the Sunčane Skale festival. Her song, "Ruža Ružica" (lit. 'Red Rose') became an instant hit, placing her fourth in the festival. Gočeva also released her new song "Se lažam sebe" (lit. 'I'm Lying to Myself'), written by Kaliopi. At the end of 2005, she released her fifth studio album titled Vo Zaborav in Macedonian (lit. 'In Oblivion') and U Zaboravu in Serbian; the album included a total of nine new songs. The Serbian-language version produced numerous singles which gained popularity in many former Yugoslav countries; these included "Teško srcu pada" (lit. 'The Heart Feels Heavy') and "Gorka pilula" (lit. 'A Bitter Pill') as well as "Kad mi nebo bude dom" (lit. 'When the Sky Becomes My Home') and "Kao malo vode" (lit. 'Like a Bit of Water') written by Zlatan Stipišić Džiboni and Vlatko Stefanovski. In 2006, Gočeva recorded a cover of the song "Radost za cel svet" (lit. 'Joy to the Whole World') for the Christmas album Tanja i Prijatelite Vi Pejat Božikni Pesni (lit. 'Tanja and Friends Sing Christmas Songs for You').

On 24 February 2007, Gočeva participated in, and won, the Skopje Fest competition, held at the Universal Hall in Skopje, with the song "Mojot svet" written by Grigor Koprov and composed by Ognen Nedelkovski. "Mojot svet" is a power ballad that emphasises the power of music to "transcend religion and borders". Gočeva obtained a total of 144 points with a maximum of twelve points from every voting district, procuring her a landslide victory. With this feat, she became the first artist to represent Macedonia twice at the Eurovision Song Contest. She competed in the semi-final in Helsinki, Finland on 10 May 2007, performing at number 18. She qualified for the final and performed in the sixth slot on 12 May 2007, where she placed fourteenth in a field of 24 contestants with a score of 73 points.

=== 2007–2014: Makedonsko Devojče 1, Kapka Pod Neboto and Makedonsko Devojče 2 ===
On 15 December 2007, Gočeva participated on Radijski festival with the song "Kad te nema" and finished in second place, winning the award for best composition given by the jury. That same year, she also participated at the Croatian Radio Festival with the song "Jedan Dan". On 26 June 2008, Gočeva released her fifth studio album Makedonsko Devojče in cooperation with composer Zlatko Origjanski, musician and member of the band Anastasia. As an experimental album arranged and produced by Nikola Micevski, the project marked a change in the musical style of the singer as all songs were influenced by local traditional music. "Ptico malečka" was released as the album's first single in North Macedonia and became widely popular. The album was a big critical and commercial success, having won in the category for Best Ethno Album at the 2008 Sunčane Skale Festival and emerged as the best-selling one of that year in Macedonia. In December 2008, the album was released in Serbia and other ex-Yugoslav countries by City Records. In 2008, Gočeva performed the song "Dafino vino crveno" together with the Tavitjan Brothers during their concert at Universal Hall accompanied by Damjan Pejčinovski on guitar.

In May 2009, she announced her single "Kraj" with Serbian R&B/hip-hop artist Wikluh Sky. The single was atop many charts in Republic of Macedonia and other former Yugoslav republics. She also performed the single at the opening ceremony of Big Brother Serbia. The second single, titled "Za Godina, Dve" (Serbian version: "Uspomene na tebe") is a power ballad about ending a relationship and was released in December 2009. The song became an instant radio hit in the Republic of Macedonia and was further promoted on the Serbian TV show Sve Za Ljubav and on the semi-final of Veliki Brat. Gočeva's sixth studio album Kapka Pod Neboto was released on 29 November 2010 along with a Serbian language edition titled Kap Ispod Neba. On 30 March 2013 Karolina appeared on the talk show Eden na Eden and gave an interview to host Žarko Dimitrievski.

On 25 February 2014, Gočeva released the album Makedonsko Devojče 2 as a sequel to the 2008 record; both of them were known under the collective name Makedonsko Devojče due to their distinctive sound. Three singles were released from the album: "Čalgiska" as the lead single on 6 December 2013, "Dve liri (ne ni bilo pišano)" on 13 January 2014 and "Koj da mi zapee" in April 2015. As the first album of the project, Makedonsko Devojče 2 was equally successful and well received by both the public and music critics who appreciated the combination of traditional folk music with pop elements. Songs from the project were composed and arranged by pianist Nikola Micevski and most lyrics were written by Valentin Skoleski and Vesna Malinova.

The promotion of the album started at a concert broadcast by MRT with a performance of the song "Dve liri". As part of the promotional tour of the album in Macedonia, the singer gave five subsequent performances at the Macedonian Opera and Ballet from 20 to 24 February 2014, a sold-out concert at the Boris Trajkovski Area; in total around 15.000 tickets were sold to her concerts. Other cities across the country where she performed as part of the album's promotion included Bitola, Ohrid and Prilep. A wider tour in promotion of the album took place in Serbia at the Ilija M. Kolarac Endowment in Belgrade and at the Carnegie Hall in New York together with Macedonian composer Duke Bojadziev. The following years after the release of the album were spent on wide promotion through live appearances and regional performances. Makedonsko Devojče 2 emerged as the best-selling album of 2014 in North Macedonia. Additionally, Gočeva broke the record for most held concerts that year with seven. On 6 December 2014, Karolina appeared on the talk show Eden na Eden together with Nina Badrić.

On 13 February 2016, Gočeva appeared on the Macedonian talk show Eden na Eden together with Duke Bojadzhiev. In October 2016, English singer Joss Stone sang "Koj da mi zapee" together with Gočeva at a park in Skopje as part of a series of videos filmed during her visits to various countries as part of her Total World Tour. A professionally recorded video of the performance was published on the official YouTube accounts of both Stone and Gočeva on 18 October 2016.

In 2017, Gočeva worked on a rework of the song "Fenix" (lit. 'Phoenix') originally written by Montenegrin musician Momčilo Zeković for the album Džep sa tajnama (lit. 'A Pocket of Secrets'). The song was recorded in the studios Musicland in Podgorica and Momirovski in Skopje under the guidance of Aleksandar Saša Gajić and Dejan Momirovski. The arrangement was finalized by Gajić, while the mastering by James Cruz at Zeitgeist Sound Studios in New York in 2017. She further promoted it through a live performance in Podgorica.

=== 2018–2020: Izvor ===
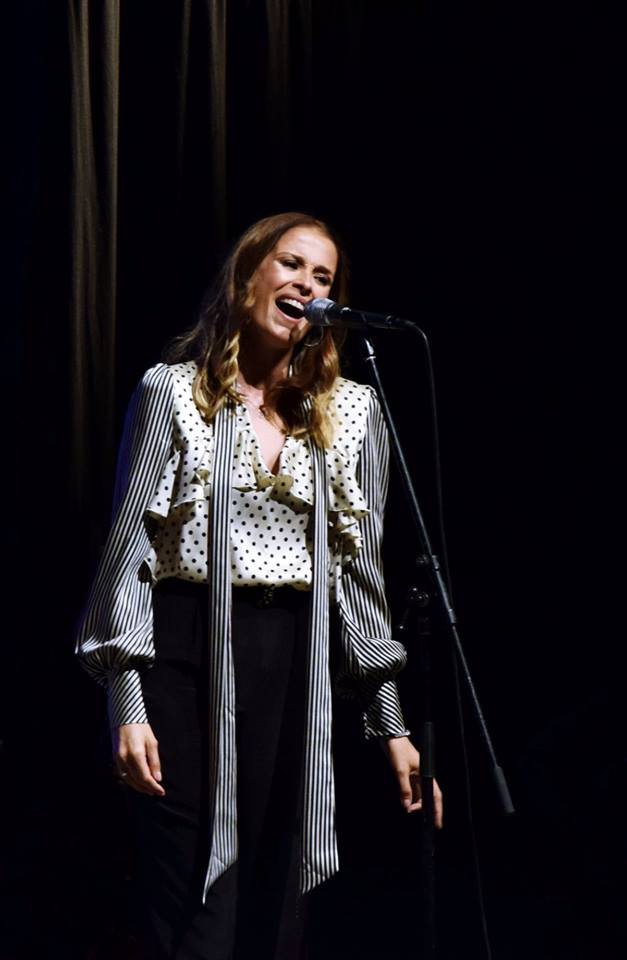
Gočeva performing during a concert in 2018.

On 23 February 2018, Gočeva released Izvor, her ninth studio album in North Macedonia. The album was produced by Micevski while Vesna Malinova served as the main songwriter along with Vesna "Bejbi" Petrushevska. The album was preceded by the Christmas-themed song, "Dzvona" (lit. 'Bells') released along with a music video on 19 December 2017. The music was arranged by Nikola Micevski, with lyrics by Vesma Malinova and Ognen Šapkovski from Melem Produkcija having made the music video. "Dzvona" was dedicated to "people who are not among us, but are present in our hearts". Immediately after its release, "Dzvona" was very well received by the singer's fanbase and music critics. Writing for Crno i Belo, a journalist noted, "With a melody that takes you to a magical place... 'Dzvona' will be pleasant to the ears and eyes during this festive season." The uptempo track "Beli cvetovi" (lit. 'White flowers') was released as the album's second single on 31 October 2018. A writer for Crno i Belo praised it as "dynamic" while calling Gočeva "cheerful" and "entertaining" in the music video for the "spot-on song".

In April 2019, the album was also released in Croatia through Croatia Records, marking the singer's first release in that country. In line with her previous two musical projects, the album is predominantly a pop record with elements of swing, jazz and ethno music. "Ti ne dojde", one of the songs featured on the album, received the accolade for Ethno/World Music Song of the Year at the 2019 Music Awards Ceremony in Belgrade. Promotion of the album took place with a local tour and festival performances across North Macedonia. After successfully promoting the album, the singer took a brief hiatus from the music industry in 2019.

=== 2020–2022: Pesni za Ljubov i Kopnež ===
From 2020 to 2021, Gočeva started working on her tenth studio album which would include 11 Macedonian songs, mostly "neglected during the years", from the 1950s, '60s, and '70s from authors such as Dragan Gjakonovski Shpato, Dimitar Masevski, Todor Bojadzhiev and Ljubomir Brangjolica among others. The conception of the album was made following her collaboration with Bojadzhiev in 2016, when they sang "Prazno e bez ovaa ljubov", written by Todor Bojadzhiev, at the Metropolis Arena. In 2019, Gočeva moved to New York City where she spent time singing and playing the piano with Bojadzhiev and Lumanovski. Despite their initial plans to release the album in 2020, the project had to be postponed due to the COVID-19 pandemic. Most of the album was recorded at the Macedonian Philharmonic in January 2021; the trio spent two days rehearsing and two days recording due to time constraints and other pandemic-related restrictions.

The first song of the album, titled "Idila", was released with a music video on 2 June 2021 featuring Duke Bojadzhiev and Ismail Lumanovski. On 11 June 2021, she appeared on the Bosnian show Konačno petak where she briefly spoke about the song and the upcoming album as well as her participation in the ESC. On 5 November 2021, Gočeva released "Krv da ni se stori" in collaboration with Bojadzhiev and Branislav Nikolov, a member of the band Foltin who was featured under the pseudonym Pijan Slavej. On 21 September 2021, Gočeva gave a concert at the Pelister National Park, as part of the project titled "30 Years of Cultural Beauty" which was part of a celebration of 30 years of independence of the country, supported by the Government of North Macedonia. On 4 September 2022, Gočeva appeared on Macedonian YouTuber Steffonator's show 90 Seconds where she answered questions about her private life. On 21 October 2022, Gočeva appeared on the Bosnian talk show Konačno petak where she gave an interview and performed her Serbian-language songs "Više se ne vraćaš" and "Uspomene na tebe" as well as the Macedonian "Koj da mi zapee" accompanied by the band MP BHRT. On 8 November 2022, it was announced through a press release on Avalon Production, that the album titled Pesni za Ljubov i Kopnež, would be promoted through a concert at the Macedonian Philharmony on 23 December. The following day, the album was released through all digital platforms in North Macedonia.

=== 2022–2023: "Od nebo do dno" and MRT performance ===
On 25 August 2022, Gočeva released "Od nebo do dno" (lit. 'From Heaven to Bottom'), a pop dance song produced by Robert Bilbilov and written by Vladimir Danilovikj and Vesna Malinova. The song marked her first return to the genre after 12 years and was her intention to make it in line with the trends in music across the world. A dance-inspired music video was also simultaneously released with the song. Music critics and the singer's fanbase were pleased with the song which they saw as a refreshment following her year-long hiatus of making new music. The same day, a Serbian-language version of the song, titled "Ti si moj" (lit. 'You Are Mine') was released through Magic Records. On 25 January 2023, Gočeva performed "Ti si moj" at the first evening of the 2023 Music Awards Ceremony held in Belgrade. Her performance and fashion style received very positive comments from a journalist of Sloboden pechat who deemed them to be "perfect". Gočeva also served as the show's presenter together with Croatian singer Petar Grašo while handing the award for Best Rap/Hip-Hop Song of the Year.

On 31 December 2022, Gočeva appeared on MRT1 where she gave a 90-minute long show for New Year's Eve. Apart from her own songs – "I Ke Bide Se Vo Red", "Za Nas", "Od Nebo Do Dno", "Sakaj Me", "Milenium so Tebe" and "Kazi Mi" – she also gave four collaborative performances: "Krv Da Ni Se Stori" with Pijan Slavej, "Kilometri" with Vlatko Lozanovski, "Nekogas ke Pomine" with Lara Ivanova and "Doživotno" with Elena Risteska. Live performances of all songs were released on the singer's official YouTube channel on 26 July 2023.

=== 2023–present: Upcoming tenth studio album ===
In March 2023, Gočeva gave an interview for the Žilet show on the Macedonian Radio Television. On 13 December 2023, Gočeva released the song "Daj na Sunce" (English: Give to the sun) written by Dino Muharemović and arranged by Dino Šukalo alongside a black-and-white music video directed by Miomir Milić. The song premiered at the Serbian radio station "Naxi" where the singer briefly revealed that the title serves as a call for the female protagonist to show her beautiful face to the sun. She recorded the song two months prior its release. The clip was filmed in November at a cold temperature of - 5°C on two locations on the Macedonian Bistra Mountain, including Galičnik and Mavrovo.

In promotion of the song, she appeared on the show Među Nama on the Serbian channel Nova S in Belgrade on 21 December 2023 where she gave an interview. On 22 December, she appeared on the Serbian show Kec na jedanaest in Belgrade where she further promoted the song, gave an interview and performed her Serbian-language songs "Srešćemo se Opet", "Kad Voliš", and "Više se ne Vraćaš" as well as a Macedonian cover version of "Ako Zgrešam Neka Izgoram". The singer spoke as well about her plans of a future studio album on which she had placed several of her own songs, announced a new single before its final release and said she was aiming for a release by September or October of that year. Speaking about her future plans of attending the Eurovision Song Contest, she revealed how much responsibility she was faced with the last time she had performed in 2007 and that given the advancement of social media analyses of both the semi-final and final entries, she would not necessarily want to go through the "stressful experience" again.

On 1 and 2 March 2024, Gočeva held two consecutive concerts at the night club Pure in Skopje; she was reviewed very positively as "fantastic" by a writer of CrnoBelo. Later that month, on 22 March, she appeared in Tirana, Albania where she gave a performance at the National Theatre of Opera and Ballet of Albania. On 24 March 2024, Gočeva held her first concert in the town of Kriva Palanka where she predominantly performed songs from Makedonsko Devojče and Izvor apart from her older hits. During an interview with Macedonian radio station Play Radio on 15 April 2024, Gočeva revealed that the tenth studio album would feature songs written by her and that a third single would also precede its release. On 4 July 2024, Gočeva gave a concert at the "Dzvezdena Simfonija" (English: Starry Symphony) event in Bitola. On 4 September 2024, Gočeva appeared in a commercial to celebrate telecommunication operator A1 Macedonia's fifth anniversary celebration with a newly recorded version of her song "Sakaj me". The commercial' s motto was the line "Life is wonderful with you" taken from the song. In early September, she also announced six shows in Germany as part of her Best of Tour in late 2024 including Stuttgart on 23 November, Nuremberg on 25 November, Düsseldorf on 29 November, Mainz on 1 December, Hamburg on 13 December and Berlin on 16 December.

On 27 May 2025, Gočeva appeared on the Serbian TV show Ekskluziv in Belgrade and gave an interview to Lola Radaković for Prva.rs. She shared the work on her Macedonian projects and how proud she was of herself of being the founder of the new "back to the roots" wave in Macedonian music which included modern reworks of traditional songs. She also shared how she found it difficult to appeal to the "unpredictable" musical tastes of the young generation but acknowledged she finds it important for her work to be representative of her character. On 7 May 2025, Karolina released her new song "Mog Života Dio" written by Dino Muharemović and arranged by Dino Šukalo along with a music video directed by Miomir Milić. Wanting to further promote the song, the singer appeared on the Serbian talk show Spika i Prilika where she sang it live while playing the piano. At the show, she appeared together with guests Bojan Marović and Nataša Mihajlović of Frajle and discussed aspects of her career. On 15 June 2025, Karolina appeared as a guest on the "FEEDBACK with Elena" TV show where she discussed music, fashion and life-related topics. On 8 December 2025, Gočeva took to her social media platforms where she shared her first photograph ever taken for the school magazine Ekran.

On 4 January 2026, Gočeva appeared on the sixteenth episode of Serbian TV show Nikad nije kasno, where she performed a mash-up of "Mog života dio" and "Više se ne vraćaš" dressed in a design by Jovana Zuka. She also gave a brief interview to Grand Online where she discussed her dreams, dealing with stage anxiety, her trip to Tokyo, Japan and her amazement at the culture and its cleanliness. She also shared how commercials discussing the issue of loneliness she watched touched her deeply and made her cry. She also shared how she never got to meet her grandparents because they died before she was born, which is why she tried to convince her grandmother that they can make Santa Claus her grandfather. She also discussed how travelling enriches her life, her visit to Doku, Qatar in 2025. She finally shared how much she misses Toše Proeski and her two other colleagues who died in the Kočani nightclub fire.

On 25 February 2026, Gočeva appeared on the Ceca Show in Belgrade where she discussed the music tastes of different age groups in North Macedonia, particularly the tendency of the younger generation to listen to trap music. She also touched upon the problem of going out in public and her experiences with being stalked as well as other uncomfortable interactions with the public. She shared how she often goes around masked in Skopje in order to avoid uncomfortable encounters. During one segment of the show, she also played the "guess the word" game while having headphones on and never have I ever with fellow guests. She performed a piano version of Ceca's "Gore od ljubavi" written by Marina Tucaković and arranged by Aleksandar Milić Mili. On 24 March 2026, she appeared as a guest on the Ami G show during the 29th episode of the 18th season, where she sang "Kraj" and "Ti i ja" and discussed her memories of Marinko Madžgalj after her collaboration with Flamingosi on the latter song.

Her tenth studio album is intended to be a pop project which would appeal to the regional tastes and thus include material in Serbian.

On 23 September 2026 she released the song "Si ljubela ke ljubiš" in collaboration with Pijan Slavej and produced by Dragi Ivanov.

== Artistry ==
Gočeva's music is regarded primarily as pop. She has additionally ventured in many other musical styles of Macedonian ethno music, predominantly incorporating elements of čalgija. According to Dave Wilson, a music critic of the New Zealand School of Music, she can be classified in the so-called "second wave of ethno music" along with other performers such as Ljubojna and Chalgia Sound System. With her later projects, Gočeva has also managed to create her own distinctive sound where "all her technical capabilities are on display" and several genres amalgamate. The music released by the singer in the period between 2008 and 2018 involved traditional arrangements mixed with jazz, funk and soul. The modern lyrics of her songs often reflected the positive and negative love experiences of the female protagonist.

During interviews, Gočeva has shared that some of her music influences include Madonna and contemporary artists such as Dua Lipa, Cardi B, Whitney Houston, Cyndi Lauper, Coldplay and Hurts. Additionally, while she was young, her parents frequently took her to concerts held by Yugoslav pop stars in Bitola. Since 2003, she is accompanied by an 8-member band. During an interview, Gočeva revealed that she has always taken part of the creative process and takes part in compiling set lists, discussing the set-up of concerts and song arrangements.

== Legacy ==
Upon her first entry in the Serbian pop market, Gočeva quickly rose to popularity. One of the "obstacles" she encountered at the beginning of the career was the opinions of others as she could easily fall under the musical influence or suggestions of her surroundings instead of staying genuine to her own musical style. Through the years, she decided that in addition to venturing in pop music, she also likes to experiment with different musical styles, something she sees as essential in an artist.

Gočeva is widely known as the most famous Macedonian female pop singer. For her popularity, she has received the labels "Macedonian pop princess/queen" and "pop diva" among others.

== Personal life ==
Despite widespread media speculations about the singer's love life, she has successfully managed to hide it from the press. Nevertheless, Serbian media have associated her past love relationships with businessman Aladin Dina Balić, café owner Grozdan from Skopje and Željko Ražnjatović's son Mihajlo. In September, 2017, Gočeva married Mihail Korubin, a Macedonian artist, after approximately 2 years of dating. During an interview, Gočeva briefly revealed that the two had met during the photo-shooting for the promotional material of her ninth studio album Izvor. Korubin proposed to her at the Petrovac airport in Skopje at a war location.

Her fashion style is created by the stylist Caci Pakovska, with whom she has collaborated for more than 20 years as of 2024. During an interview, she revealed that she prefers her style to be loose and casual, especially when performing on stage. Gočeva is also physically active by jogging and performing exercises. One of her hobbies includes traveling and during an interview she revealed that she has the custom of traveling to a new place every year as a form of enrichment of her life and spirit.

On 16 May 2026, Gočeva became the object of misogyny, sexism and hate speech when a video of a group of players of FK Vardar included her name in a vulgar song. Bitola's officials, local media outlets and the public condemned the club's coach Milenko Nedelkovski and the involved players, and the incident was broadcast on national news. As a result, FK Vardar's act was condemned by the Football Federation of Macedonia, for which it was fined.

=== Activism ===
Gočeva has been part of several activist movements, predominantly in Croatia. In 2006, she released the song "Bela pesna" with Aki Rahimovski against drug use. In 2010, she collaborated with Maya Sar, Aleksandra Radović, and Nina Badrić for the song "Moj je život moja pjesma", which was part of a campaign against uterine cancer. In 2016 and 2017, Gočeva participated in the campaign titled "16 days activism against gender-based violence". She has also been active in campaigns that promote organ donations.

== Discography ==
=== Studio albums ===
- Mamo, pušti me (1992)
- Jas Imam Pesna (2000)
- Zošto Sonot Ima Kraj (2002)
- Znaeš Kolku Vredam (2003)
- Kad Zvezde Nam Se Sklope... Kao Nekada (2003)
- Vo Zaborav (2005) / U Zaboravu (2006)
- Makedonsko Devojče (2008)
- Kapka Pod Neboto (2010)
- Najubavi Pesni (2012)
- Makedonsko Devojče 2 (2014)
- Izvor (2018)
- Pesni za Ljubov i Kopnež (2022)

== See also ==
- Music of North Macedonia
- North Macedonia in the Eurovision Song Contest

Awards and achievements
Preceded by XXL with "100% te ljubam"	Macedonia in the Eurovision Song Contest; 2002	Succeeded by Toše Proeski with "Life"
Preceded by Elena Risteska with "Ninanajna"	Macedonia in the Eurovision Song Contest; 2007	Succeeded by Tamara Todevska, Vrcak and Adrian Gaxha with "Let me love you"
