= Si-Do =

Children's festival in Bitola, North Macedonia

Detski Muzicki Festival Si-Do is a children's festival held annually in Bitola, North Macedonia. Held in November, it has gained much support from the audience in recent years. Children from across the country participated on this event which usually consisted of 15–20 songs. This festival was supported by the children center"Bitola" from Bitola which organizes this event under a different topic every year. The name of the festival was derived from Petar Sidovski, a famous Bitola composer.

In 1991 the future Eurovision contestant Karolina Goceva performed at this festival. Later, in 1994 the M2 production singer Dimitar Andonovski performed with the song "Koga Ema bi znaela" and Katerina Kontoklotsis sang "Deca Bozji".In 1998 the pianist and singer Hristijan Spirovski sang at this festival with the song "Marija".

Many notable Bitola composers as Petar Sidovski, Kire Kostov, Slave Dimitrov, Petar Gorgjiev-Kalica, Mile Serdenkov, Kiril Todorovski, Milko Lozanovski, Miodrag and Marjan Necak have composed songs for the festival. The general director was manager of the children center Gordana Stamatova, and the art director - Kire Kostov. The conductor of the Si-Do choir was Snezana Naumovska. Ivan Georgievski was the dance coordinator of the festival.

After a seven-year break the children's festival "SI DO" has been resumed by the association of culture "ProMedia" Bitola. The association of culture "ProMedia" Bitola the name "SI DO" is fully protected on 2005 year. In 2005 this festival has made its resumption into an International children's Festival "SIDO".

The general manager of the festival is composer Mile SHerdenkov and the art manager composer Darko SHerdenkov. The children's choir is conducted by Dragana SHerdenkov. International children's music festival "Si-Do" is held every year at the City Culture centre in Bitola, in May. Children from different countries such as Bulgaria, Romania, Slovenia, Serbia, Greece, Albania, Ukraine, Russia, Italy and North Macedonia take part in this International music festival.
