= Kraj (song) =

Single by Karolina Gočeva

from the album Kapka Pod Neboto
- Released: May 18, 2009
- Recorded: 2009
- Genre: Pop, R&B
- Length: 3:32
- Label: Avalon Production
- Songwriters: Sky Wikluh; Vesna Malinova

Karolina Gočeva singles chronology
"Za Kogo?" (2008)	"Kraj" (2009)	"Zaboravi" (2009)

Music video
- "Kraj" (Video) on YouTube

"Kraj" (in Macedonian Cyrillic: Крај, English translation: End) is 2009 single by the Macedonian pop singer Karolina Gočeva included on her sixth studio album Kapka Pod Neboto (2010). The song was recorded in Macedonian and Serbian with lyrics written by Sky Wikluh and Vesna Malinova, respectively. The song regained popularity in 2025 through social media platforms Instagram and TikTok. The following year, on 9 January 2026, a remix by Delovski and Sempre was released.

== Production history ==
The author of the music for this song is Serbian hip hop artist Sky Wikluh. The song is released in two versions: Macedonian and Serbian. Following its release, the song was widely listened by the audience.

== Promotion ==
In mid-June 2009, Karolina shot a video for this song with the Macedonian video production Tomato. In the video, the singer showed herself in a new edition, as she is seen soiling in water while dancing. The video had its official showing on 5 July 2009.

On 27 January 2026, Karolina sang a piano version of "Kraj" and posted it on her Instagram account, sharing how she noticed the song becoming more popular during her live appearances and concerts.

On 24 March 2026, Karolina appeared as a guest on the Ami G show during the 29th episode of the 18th season where she discussed that she was surprised about the song regaining traction in the past year in North Macedonia and Serbia through social media platforms Instagram and TikTok. She also sang a live rendition of the Serbian version of the song, accompanied by a band. On 9 January 2026, a remix of the song by Delovski and Sempre was released. On 25 February, another remix of the song, titled Monarch Afro Edit was released.
