= Znaeš Kolku Vredam =

Studio album by Karolina Gočeva
- Released: 3 August 2003 (Republic of Macedonia)
- Recorded: 2002 – 2003
- Genre: Pop
- Label: Avalon Production

Karolina Gočeva chronology
Zošto Sonot Ima Kraj (2001)	Znaeš Kolku Vredam (2003)	Vo Zaborav (2005)

Singles from Znaeš Kolku Vredam
- 1. "Štom Sakaš" Released: 2002; 2. "Ljubov Pod Oblacite" Released: 2003; 3. "Srešćemo Se Opet" Released: 2003; 4. "Hipokrit" Released: 2003; 5. "Znaeš Kolku Vredam" Released: 2004; 6. "Ljubovta E Moja Religija" Released: 2004

Znaeš Kolku Vredam is the third studio album by Macedonian pop musician, Karolina Gočeva. The album was released in Macedonia and in Serbia, Montenegro, Bosnia & Herzegovina under the Serbo-Croatian title Kad Zvezde Nam Se Sklope... Kao Nekada.

== Track listings ==
1. "Hipokrit"
2. "Ljubov Pod Oblacite"
3. "Od Nebo Do Dno"
4. "Ne Se Plašam"
5. "Znaeš Kolku Vredam"
6. "Sirena"
7. "Noќ"
8. "Štom Sakaš"
9. "Ljubovta E Moja Religija"
- "Srešćemo Se Opet" Cover Vlado Janevski Nekogas i negde

== Awards ==
=== Golden Lady Bug ===
- Female Singer Of The Year
- Album Of The Year
- Song Of The Year
- Concert Of The Year
- Music Video Of The Year

=== 12 Veličenstveni ===
- Choice Of The Audience
- Female Singer Of The Year
- Album Of The Year
- Music Video Of The Year

=== Tin-Šema ===
- Female Singer Of The Year
- Music Video Of The Year
- Song Of The Year

== Chart positions ==
Year	Song	Chart positions
Year	Song	Macedonia
2002	"Štom Sakaš"	#1
2003	"Ljubov Pod Oblacite"	#1
2003	"Srešćemo Se Opet"	#1
2003	"Hipokrit"	#1
2003	"Znaeš Kolku Vredam"	#1
2003	"Ljubovta E Moja Religija"	#1
