= Duper (band) =

Macedonian pop duo band

Duper Дупер
- Origin: Skopje, North Macedonia
- Genres: Pop
- Years active: 2018–present
- Labels: Avalon production (2018-2019); Independent (2019-present)
- Members: Boris Kakurinov, Ilčo Necovski
- Past members: Martina Barakoska

Duper (Macedonian: Дупер; stylized as DUPER) is a Macedonian pop duo band founded in Skopje. The band consists of Boris Kakurinov who plays the guitar and piano and Ilčo Necovski who serves as the lead vocal and the bass guitar player. Martina Barakoska was a member of the band until 2019 and played drums. The band gained popularity with their debut single "Ne sum tvoj tip" (2018) which was met with positive critics and the band's original sound was heavily praised by the public and the media.

== Background ==
The band premiered on the music scene with the song "Ne sum tvoj tip" released on 20 June 2018 with a music video directed by Tomi Akimovski. The song gained instant popularity and the band receives widespread praise for their original, new sound. In 2021, the music video for the song garnered more than 3 million views on YouTube. The band signed a contract with the record label Avalon production which they cancelled in 2019. The same year, citing creative differences, Martina Barakoska left the group. On 20 May 2020, the band released "Smeneta" in collaboration with Matej Foltz.

The band's debut studio album Hiper was released on 7 July 2021. It contains previously released songs "Telo za na TV", "Nie sme 2" and "Probaj da mi bides". The album contains the band's single "Rajot na zemjata" whose music video was released on 7 July and was directed by Tomislav Živković. The music, lyrics and musical arrangement of all songs were finalized by the members of the duo, while the recording, mixing and mastering was done by Angel Ćosev in his recording studio.

== Awards and nominations ==
In 2019, the band received the award for Music Discovery of the Year at the Golden Ladybug of Popularity. The same year, the band received a nomination in the category of Best Alternative Group and Best Music Video at the 2019 Music Awards Ceremony held in Belgrade, Serbia.

== Discography ==
- Hiper (2021)
