= U Zaboravu =

- U Zaboravu album cover

Studio album by Karolina
- Released: 2006
- Recorded: May 2004 – October 2005
- Genres: Pop, pop-rock
- Label: City Records link

Karolina chronology
Vo Zaborav (2005)	U Zaboravu (2006)	Makedonsko Devojče (2008)

Singles from U Zaboravu
- 1. "Lažem Sebe" Released: 2005; 2. "Ruža Ružica" Released: 2005; 3. "Teško Srcu Pada" Released: 12 December 2005; 4. "Umirem Bez Tebe" Released: 2006; 5. "U Zaboravu" Released: 2006

Professional ratings
Review scores
Source	Rating
HitParade	5/5 stars
SwissCharts	5/5 stars

U Zaboravu is the second Serbo-Croatian studio album by Macedonian pop musician Karolina Gočeva which was released in Serbia, Montenegro, Bosnia & Herzegovina and in Croatia.

== Promotion ==
Karolina had a glamorous start of her promotion for the fourth Macedonian and second Serbo-Croatian album in Skopje. She continued with her promotion in the Former Yugoslav cities Belgrade, Sarajevo, Banja Luka and Podgorica.

== Track listings ==
1. "Teško Srcu Pada"
2. "Umirem Bez Tebe"
3. "Prvi Mart"
4. "Gorka Pilula"
5. "U Zaboravu"
6. "Plovimo"
7. "Lažem Sebe"
8. "Ljubav"
9. "Kao Malo Vode"
10. "Kad Mi Nebo Bude Dom"
11. "Još Samo Jedan Dan"

Bonus Tracks

- "Ruža Ružica"

music: Zlatko Origjanski
arrangement: Zlatko Origjanski
lyrics: Zlatko Origjanski

== Release history ==
Country	Date
Bosnia and Herzegovina	2006
Croatia	2006
Montenegro	2006
Serbia	2006

== Awards ==
Sunčane Skale

- Video Of The Year ("Lažem Sebe") link
