= Vo Zaborav =

Vo zaborav Во Заборав

Studio album by Karolina Gočeva
- Released: 4 December 2005
- Recorded: May 2004 – October 2005
- Genre: Pop; traditional; pop-rock
- Label: Avalon Production

Karolina Gočeva chronology
Znaeš Kolku Vredam (2003)	Vo zaborav Во Заборав (2005)	U Zaboravu (2006)

Singles from Vo zaborav
- 1. "Se lažam sebe" Released: 2005; 2. "Ruža ružica" Released: 2005; 3. "Ova srce znae" Released: December 12, 2005; 4. "Umiram bez tebe" Released: 2006; 5. "Vo zaborav" Released: 2006

Vo zaborav (in Macedonian Cyrillic: Во заборав) is the fourth studio album by Macedonian pop musician, Karolina Gočeva. The album was released in Macedonia and subsequently in Serbia, Montenegro, Bosnia & Herzegovina and Croatia under the Serbo-Croatian title, U Zaboravu.

== Controversy ==
There have been accusations that the song "Se lažam sebe" is a cover of an Ozzy Osbourne song. The songwriter, Kaliopi, denied the claim and proved it in a court of law. The song was atop many singles charts in Macedonia, Serbia, Montenegro and Bosnia & Herzegovina.

== Track listings ==
1. "Ova srce znae"
  music: Mahir "Beat House" & Dino Šukalo
  arrangement: Dino Šukalo
  lyrics: Dino Merlin & Vesna Malinova
2. "Umiram bez tebe"
  music: Mirko Vukomanović
  arrangement: Mirko Vukomanović
  lyrics: Bajaga & Vesna Malinova
3. "Prvi mart"
  music: Mirko Vukomanović
  arrangement: Mirko Vukomanović
  lyrics: Snežana Vukomanović & Kristijan Gabroski
4. "Slatka gorčina"
  music: Mirko Vukomanović
  arrangement: Mirko Vukomanović
  lyrics: Snežana Vukomanović & Vesna Malinova
5. "Vo zaborav"
  music: Mahir "Beat House" & Dino Šukalo
  arrangement: Dino Šukalo
  lyrics: Dino Merlin & Vesna Malinova
6. "Plovime"
  music: Ivica Brčioski
  arrangement: Ivica Brčioski
  lyrics: Ivica Brčioski & Vesna Malinova
7. "Se lažam sebe"
  music: Kaliopi
  arrangement: Darko Dimitrov
  lyrics: Kaliopi
8. "Ruža ružica"
  music: Zlatko Oriǵanski
  arrangement: Zlatko Oriǵanski
  lyrics: Zlatko Oriǵanski
9. "Ljubov"
  music: Mladen Marković
  arrangement: Mladen Marković
  lyrics: Vesna Malinova
10. "Ušte samo eden den"
  music: Kaliopi
  arrangement: Darko Dimitrov
  lyrics: Kaliopi

=== Bonus Tracks ===
1. "Kao malo vode"
  music: Vlatko Stefanovski
  arrangement: Vlatko Stefanovski
  lyrics: Vlatko Stefanovski
2. "Kad mi nebo bude dom"
  music: Vlatko Stefanovski
  arrangement: Vlatko Stefanovski
  lyrics: Gibonni

== Awards ==
Sunčane skale

- Video Of The Year (Se lažam sebe)

Golden Bug Awards

- Album Of The Year
