= Super Duper =

Defunct American supermarket chain

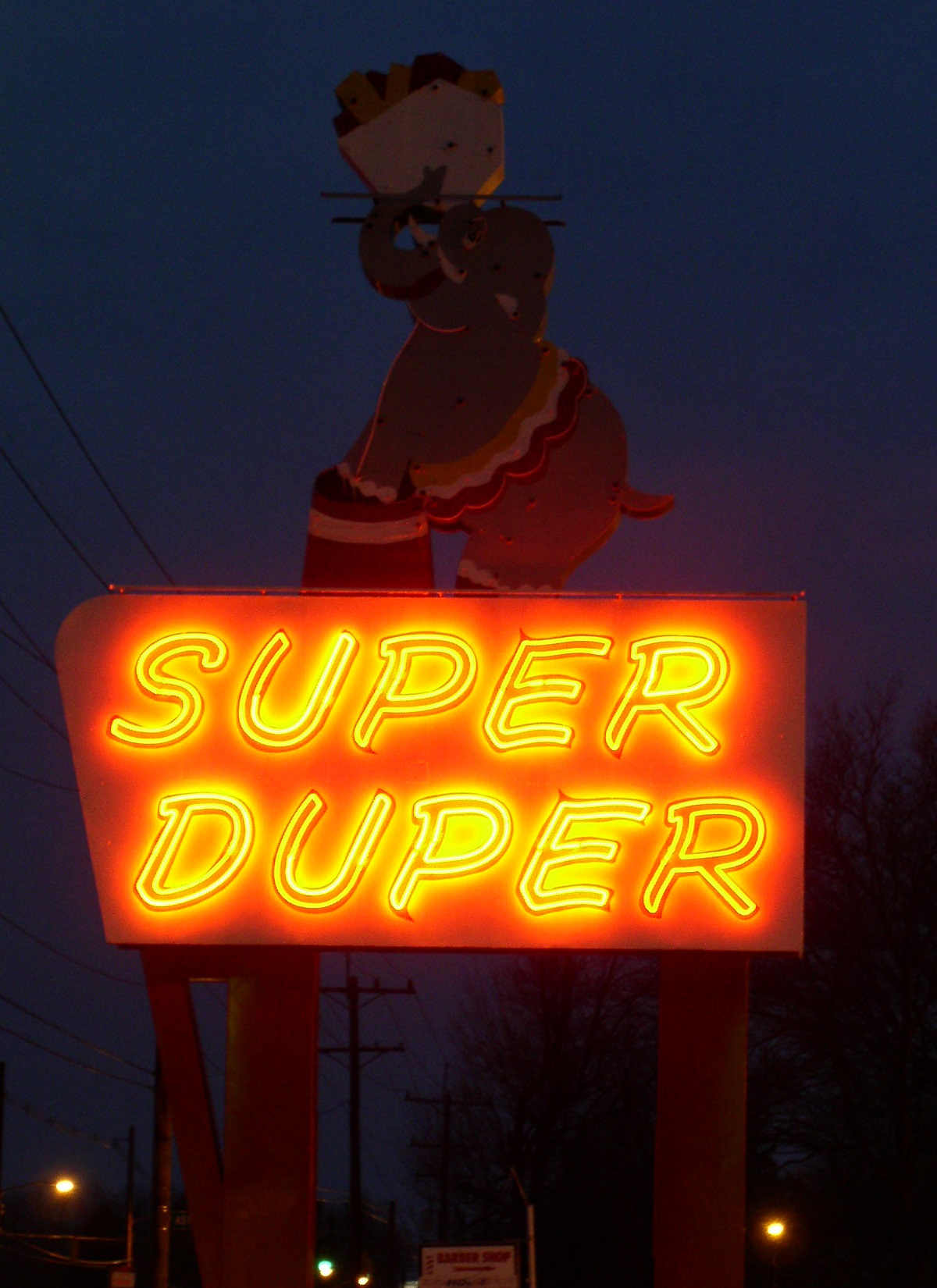
Iconic Super Duper neon sign located at 923 S. James Rd. in Columbus, Ohio

Super Duper was a chain of supermarkets once prevalent in north-eastern Pennsylvania, New York, Vermont and Ohio. With the 1997 demise of its owner, Burt Prentice Flickinger Jr., who had been instrumental in the success and growth of "S.M. Flickinger Co.", the company started a slow demise, and the last store may have disappeared in March 2010. Flickinger's son Burt III works as a consultant in the grocery industry.

Two notable stores still carrying the Super Duper name (as of June 2025) are Hull's Super Duper in New Garden, Ohio, (established in the 1970s) and Dave's Super Duper in Honesdale, Pennsylvania, (established in 1985).
