= Red & White (food stores) =

Grocery store chain

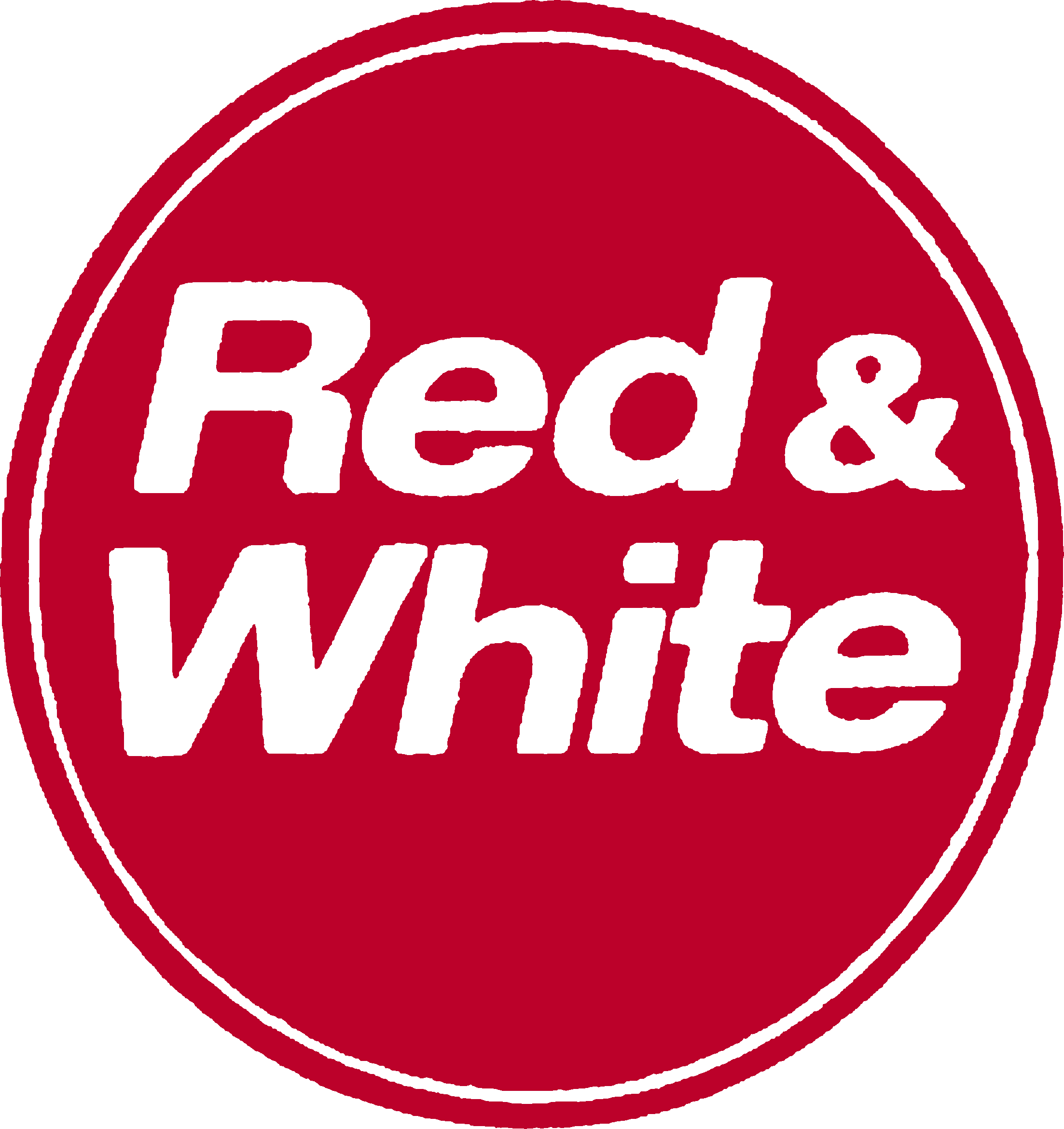
Red & White logo

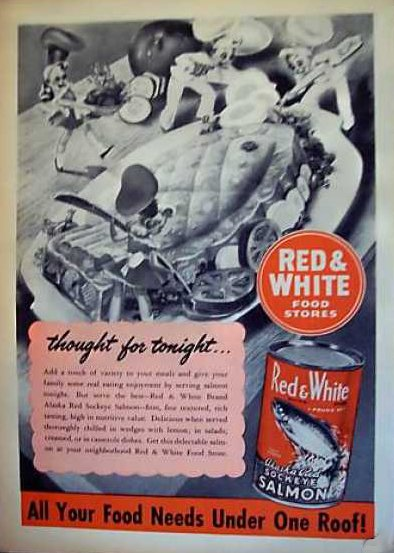
Red & White ad from 1955.

Red & White Corporation is a chain of independently owned and operated food stores in the United States and Canada. Although it has been supplanted by supermarket chains in many locations, its signature red dot logo with the words "Red & White" can still be found on small independent grocers in many states and provinces.

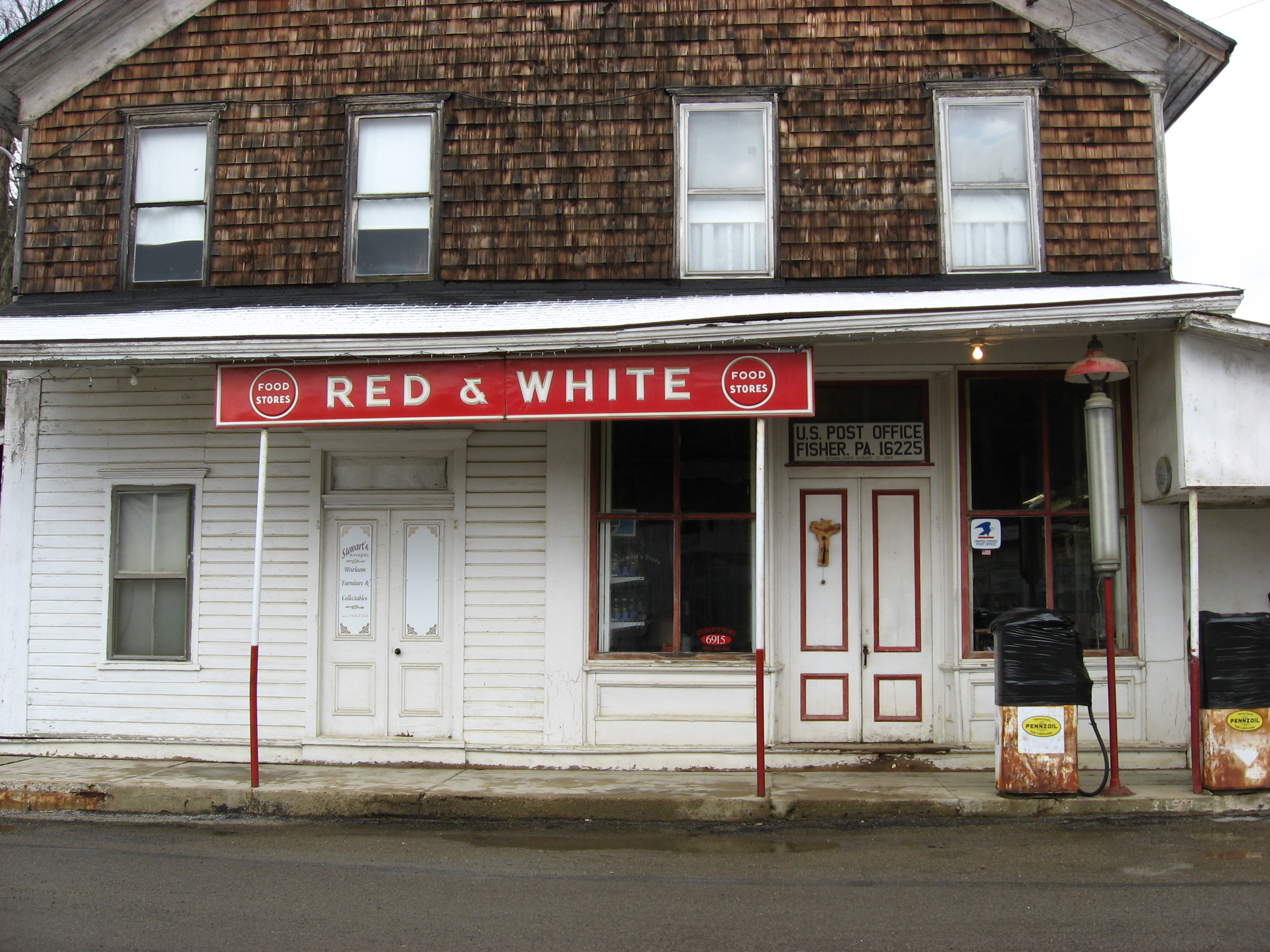
A Red & White store in 2006.

Red & White stores were originally independent grocery stores in small towns. The company centralized buying and distribution for the small stores, enabling them to compete against large chains that were consolidating their power in the 1920s. All members of this group included "Red & White" in their names, typically along with the owner’s name or town name. The firm was established around 1925.

The corporation Red & White, headquartered in Chicago, procured branded products for the independent grocery stores. The headquarters were located at the Mercantile Exchange Building at 308 West Washington Street in the present day Chicago Loop. While in Canada, since the 1940s, the Red and White network of stores has been managed by food wholesaler Western Grocers, a division of Loblaws Inc.

== Today ==
Red & White is now part of Federated Group, based in Arlington Heights, Illinois, and is still franchising the brand to independent grocers.

== Related links ==
Red & White website
