= Avalon Production =

Macedonian record label

Avalon Production (Macedonian: Авалон Продукција, romanized: Avalon Produkcija) is a Macedonian record label founded in 1993 by brothers Boban and Daniel Milošeski. Daniel Milošeski died in 2014.

== Organizing concerts ==
The record label is known for organizing numerous concerts in Skopje, Zagreb and Belgrade all by internationally famous music artist. Their first concert organization was at Kurshumli an in Skopje. Among the artists they have invited to play in Macedonia are Bob Dylan, The Prodigy, Lenny Kravitz Billy Idol, Pet Shop Boys and Duran Duran. Avalon Production signs several Macedonian music artists, including pop singer Karolina Gočeva.
