= Music of North Macedonia =

The music of North Macedonia refers to all forms of music associated with North Macedonia and its people. It shares similarities with the music of neighbouring Balkan countries, yet it remains overall distinctive in its rhythm and sound.

== Folk music ==
The ethnic Macedonian folk music (Macedonian: Народна музика, Narodna muzika) includes:

- Traditional music (Macedonian: Изворна музика, translit.: Izvorna muzika literally meaning: roots music)
- Contemporary folk music (Macedonian language: современа народна музика)

=== Traditional music ===
The Macedonian traditional music, which can be rural or urban (starogradska muzika), and is recognizable by the heavy use of the Phrygian dominant scale, includes: lyric songs, epic songs, labour songs, ritual songs, humorous songs, circle dance ("oro"), the old urban style called Čalgija (not to be confused with chalga) etc. Popular traditional songs include Kaleš bre Anǵo, Slušam kaj šumat šumite, Biljana platno beleše, Dafino vino crveno, Zemjo Makedonska and many others. Narode Makedonski is a nationalist folk song about the Macedonian national revival. Often referenced oro dances are Teškoto from the village of Galičnik, Kalajdžiskoto, Komitskoto (The Dance of the freedom fighters) and others. Tanec is a professional folk dance and music ensemble from Skopje, known for performing and preserving Macedonian folklore.

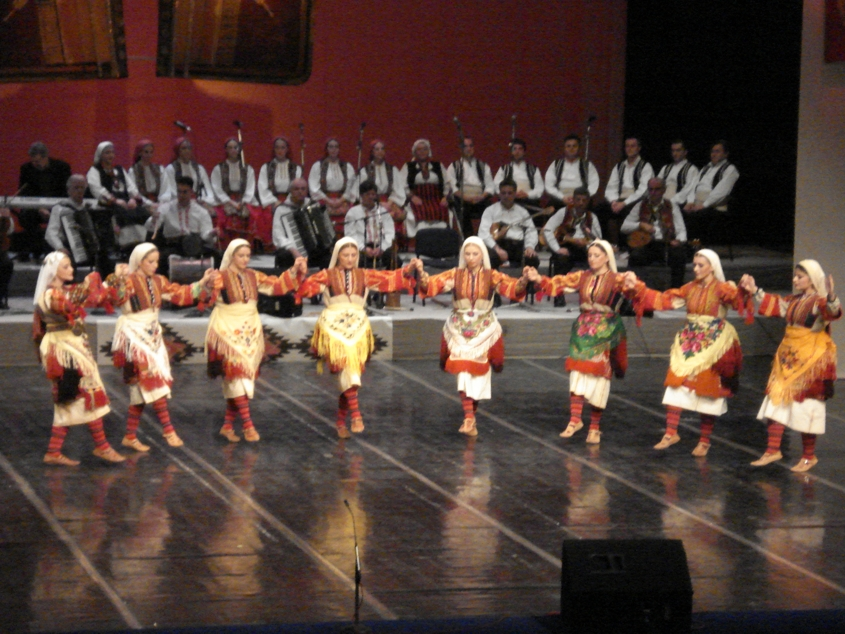
Female oro performed by Tanec

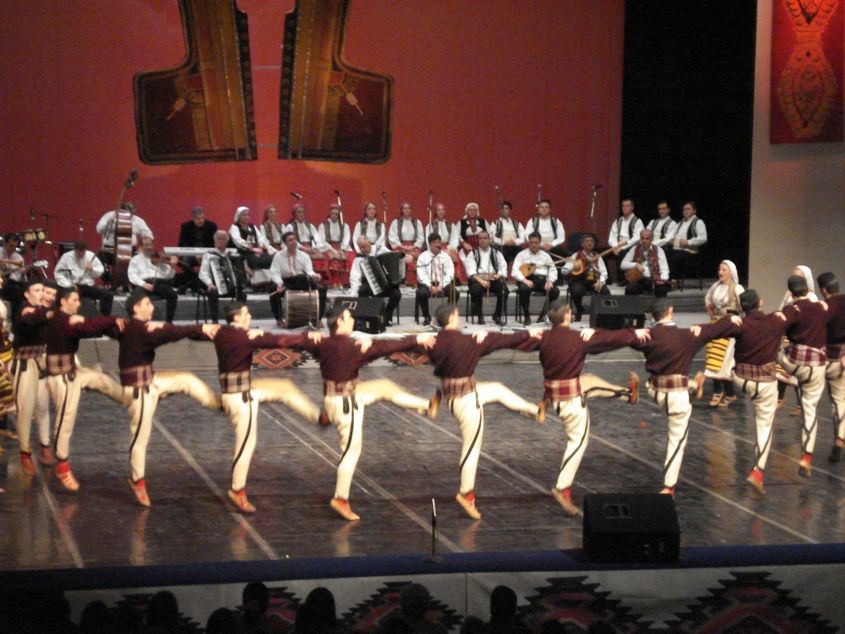
Men's oro performed by Tanec

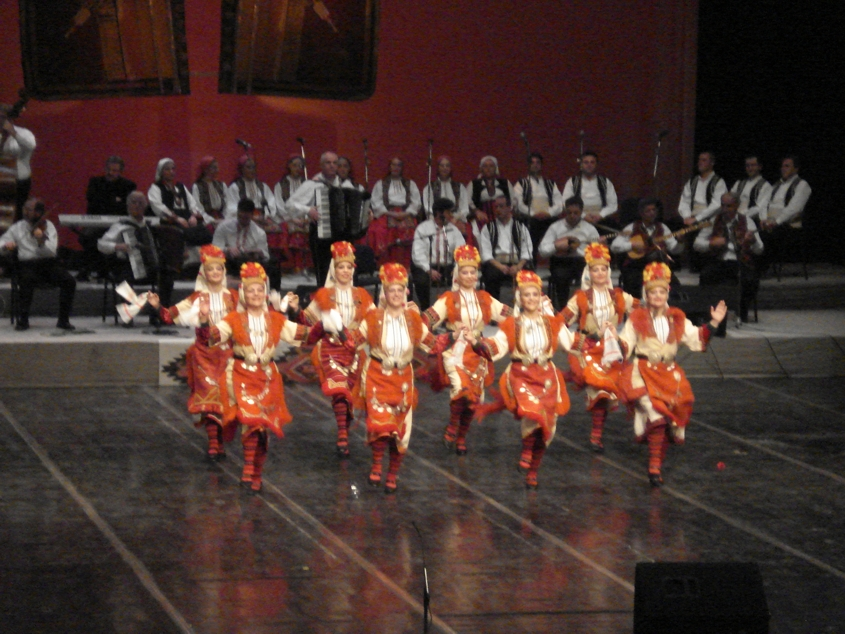
Female folk dance performed by Tanec
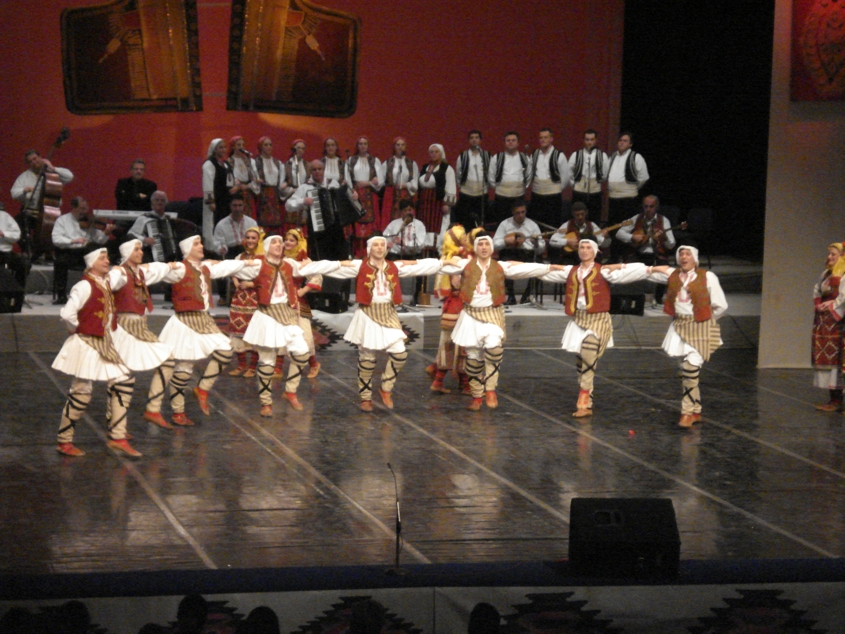
Men's oro by Tanec

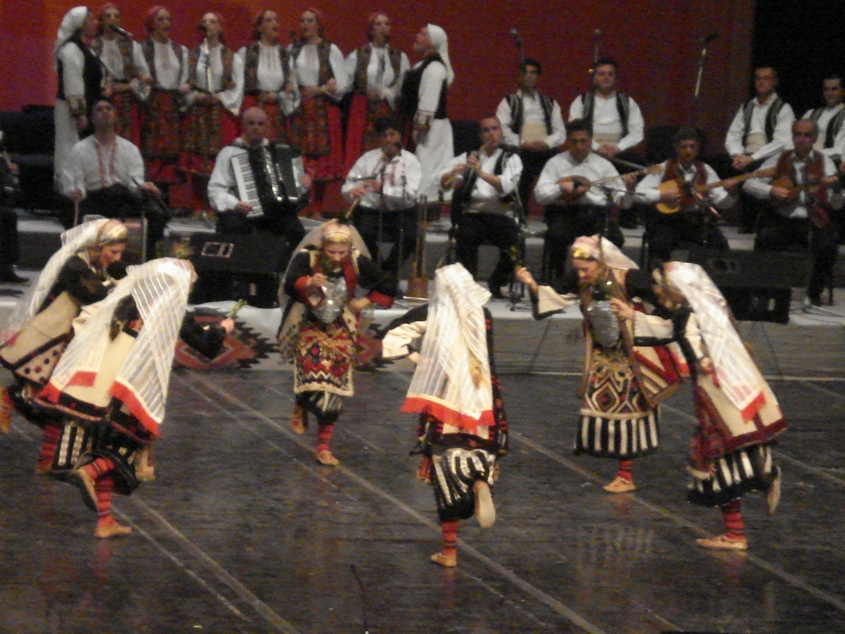
Female folk dance by Tanec

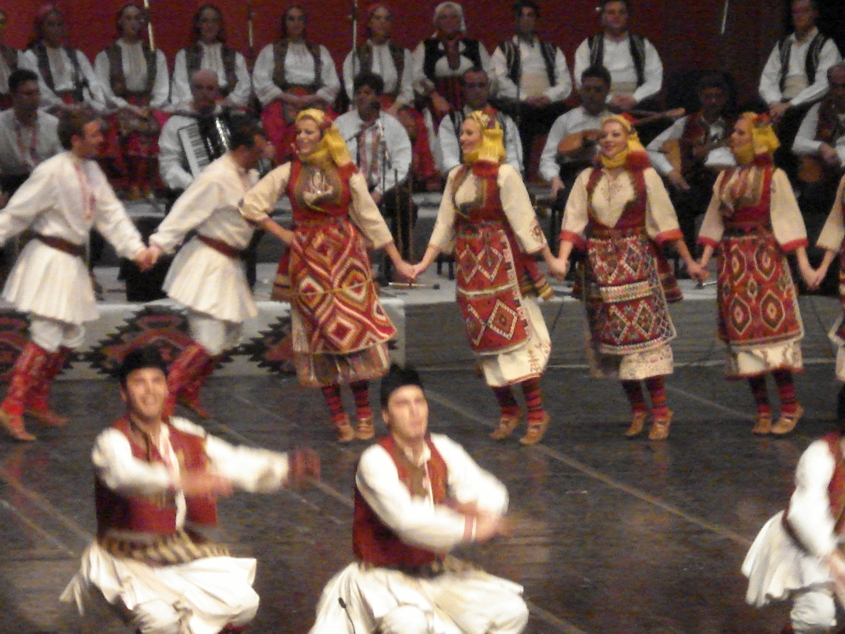
Mixed male and female dances

The music of the Balkans is known for complex rhythms. Macedonian music exemplifies this trait. Folk songs like "Pomnish li, libe Todoro" (Помниш ли, либе Тодоро) can have rhythms as complex as 22/16, divided by stanza to 2+2+3+2+2+3+2+2+2+2, a combination of the two common meters 11=2+2+3+2+2 and 11=3+2+2+2+2 (sheet music). In order to add tension to notes, musicians (primarily from older schools) will add the distinctive characteristic of stretching out beats.

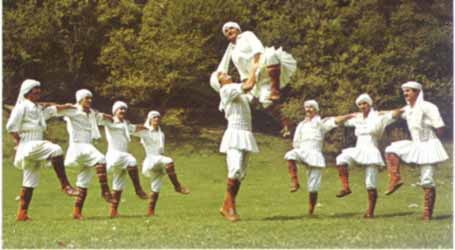
Osogovsko oro

The gajda (гајда), a type of bagpipe, was the most common folk instrument in traditional Macedonian culture. It has now become an instrument for concert recitation, drawing on recent legends like Pece Atanasovski (video), leader of the Radio Skopje ensemble Ansambl na Narodni Instrumenti, as the source of modern tradition. Other instruments include:

- šupelka (шупелка) – small flute
- kemane (кемане) – three-stringed fiddle
- tambura (тамбура) – long-necked lute
- zurla (зурла) – large double-reed horn
- tapan (тапан) – cylindrical drum
- kaval (кавал) – rim-blown flute
- harmonika (хармоника) – accordion

Macedonian folk orchestras consist of a clarinet or saxophone, drum kit, bass guitar, accordion and guitar, sometimes with modern synthesizers and drum machines. These orchestras are very popular in Macedonia. Popular members are virtuoso musicians Skender Ameti and Goran Alachki on accordion and Miroslav Businovski on clarinet.

Čalgija is an urban style, played by bands (Čalgii) with a dajre (tambourine) and tarabuka (hourglass drum) providing percussion for ut (lute), kanun (zither), clarinet and violin. Though modern musicians have updated the Čalgija into a spectrum of hard and soft, classical and pop sounds, some traditional musicians remain. Perhaps the most influential of recent years was Tale Ognenovski, who plays a wide variety of traditional and modern sounds.

After World War II People's Republic of Macedonia sponsored the creation of professional ensembles such a "Chalgii orchestra", "Folk music orchestra" and "Authentic folk instruments orchestra" which were departments of "Radio Television Skopje" and performed arranged version of folk melodies. Folk music orchestras performed arranged versions of folk melodies.

Since 1971 the Macedonian folk music duo, Selimova-Želčeski is active. At the International Folklore Conference organized by the International Folklore Committee in Istanbul, Turkey, 1977, on the subject of "Folklore on the Radio" representative from Yugoslavian Radio Television (Former Yugoslavia) was Dushko Dimitrovski, Editor of the Folk Music Department for "Radio Television Skopje" (now Macedonian Radio Television) from the Socialist Republic of Macedonia presented folklore material in his presentation entitled "Chalgija music in Macedonia", including the recordings of Macedonian folk dances: "Kasapsko oro", arranged by Tale Ognenovski, and "Kumovo oro chochek", composed by Tale Ognenovski and performed by him as clarinet soloist accompanied by the "Chalgii" orchestra of Radio Television Skopje (now Macedonian Radio Television), which created great interest not only amongst the delegates of the Conference but also around the world.

In the book entitled "Rough Guide to World Music Volume One: Africa, Europe & The Middle East" written by Simon Broughton and Mark Ellingham on page 202 subtitle: Macedonia tricky rhythm, Kim Burton noted: "In western music, a bar of triple time – such as a waltz has three equal beats: but in Macedonia it may a bar of 7/8 divided up as 3-2-2 or 2-2-3 or 2-3-2 and so on…" In this book on page 203 was written: "One of the few clarinettists to have performed successfully both with a calgia and in the more modern style is Tale Ognenovski, born in 1922 and one of the most influential musicians of the post-war era. He was a member of the Tanec group during the 1950s and lead clarinet of the Radio Skopje calgia. The composer of many tunes that have become standards, and which is the basis for Macedonia's own new composed folk music."

The magazine "Ilustrovana politika" observes,"Radio Television Belgrade" (PGP-RTB, now PGP-RTS Radio Television of Serbia, Serbia) released an LP of Macedonian folk music (LP 1439 RTB, produced in 1979), on which is performances by the extraordinary clarinetist Tale Ognenovski. His music repertoire is folk dances, jazz (besides others he includes works by Benny Goodman and Artie Shaw), concerts from Carl Maria von Weber, Mozart and Ernesto Cavallini...This is Tale Ognenovski who began to play the clarinet in the village of Brusnik near Bitola, who with this wooden instrument toured the world and received well-deserved applause wherever he performed."

In his book, For Our Music Dushko Dimitrovski writes: "The impossible becomes possible: two usually non-complementary parallel-existing worlds of sounds, Europe and The Orient, are in Tale Ognenovski's music naturally brought closer together, understand each other and merge."

In September, 2001 Tale Ognenovski released CD album: Jazz, Macedonian Folk Dances and Classical Music Reviewer Neil Horner of the MusicWeb International comments, "He is undoubtedly an exceptional artist and the predominant image created in my mind is of Benny Goodman playing the superb Contrasts he commissioned Bartók to write for him …This disc is likely to appeal to world music aficionados who enjoy the Balkan/Levantine soundworld and perhaps also those who care to hear the source musics of their classical favourites, the aforementioned Bartók but also, here, perhaps people like Skalkottas."

=== Contemporary folk music ===
Contemporary folk music is a popular style based on the traditional folk music. However, unlike it, contemporary folk music is credited to a particular author and it falls under the copyright laws, it is performed by professional musicians and it is usually (but not necessarily) played with modern instrumentation. Usually, the older performers and composers (such as the highly acclaimed Aleksandar Sarievski, Jonče Hristovski and Dobri Stavrevski) stay closer to the traditional roots, and thus contemporary folk music is often mistaken for traditional. On the other hand, the younger usually espouse a more modernized sound and image, thus often being disproved by the traditional purists as kitsch. Nevertheless, the style is popular among the common people and notable performers include: Anka Gieva, Vanja Lazarova, Violeta Tomovska, Elena Georgieva, Suzana Spasovska, Mitre Mitrevski, Efto Pupinovski, Voislav Stojanovski, Orce Stefkovski, Blagica Pavlovska, Dragan Vučić, Zoran Vanev, Vaska Ilieva Wik Kakarotski and others. Some of them also perform traditional songs. The newest generation of performers of this genre such as Aneta Micevska, Blagojce Stojanovski-TUSE, Sonja Tarculovska, Elena Velevska, Jasmina Mukaetova, Aneta Nakovska, Pane Panev altogether with the bands such as Molika, Bioritam, Akademci Bolero bend, Art Plaza have introduced a newer outlook to this kind of music inspired by the Serbian turbofolk, Bulgarian chalga, and Greek laika, so their style is more considered as pop-folk, rather than folk music.

Several popular folk music festivals exist, including: Folk fest Valandovo in Valandovo, Serenada na Širok sokak in Bitola, Cvetnici in Skopje, Ohridski trubaduri – Ohrid Fest in Ohrid and others.

=== Outside North Macedonia ===
Traditional as well as modern music is created and performed in other countries where Macedonian communities exist, which include primarily the Balkan countries surrounding North Macedonia, as well as enclaves resulting from the diaspora in the US, Australia, Canada and other countries. A notable example is the folk musician Kostas Novakis from Greece (born in Koufalia, Thessaloniki regional unit, Greek Macedonia), who claims Macedonian ethnicity and performs traditional ethnic Macedonian music. Despite the political tensions between North Macedonia, with ethnic Macedonians on one side and Greece on the other, Novakis released several CD titles with traditional ethnic Macedonian music in Greece .

=== Receiving the audience through the World of Unusual Rhythm of Macedonian Folk Music ===
"Macedonian folk music is governed by rhythmic laws and set metres. Foreign influences, in so far as they existed, where subjected to the rules of accentuation of the Macedonian popular language. The melody is usually asymmetrical... ""Teškoto" from Nižopole (Bitola) means "heavy," and indicates the heavy rhythm which is typical of very ancient dances," appeared in an article entitled, "Extracts from PROGRAMME NOTES ON THE DANCES AND SONGS performed at the Yugoslav Folk Music Festival", with the subtitle 'MACEDONIA – represented by 23 villages", published by The International Folk Music Council (IFMC) Stevan Ognenovski in his book entitled Tale Ognenovski Virtuoso of the Clarinet and Composer / Тале Огненовски виртуоз на кларинет и композитор (2000), noted: "At the "Yugoslav Folk Music Festival in Opatija, Croatia (8 to 14 September 1951) the Folk Dance group from the Bitola village of Nižopole from the Bitola in which Tale Ognenovski was playing as a clarinet soloist in the folk dance "Teškoto", received First Award as the best Folk Dance group at the festival. This was a great success because in this Festival participated 85 different folk dance groups from Macedonia, Croatia, Serbia, Slovenia, Montenegro and Bosnia and Herzegovina. The musical part of the group had only two members: Tale Ognenovski played solo clarinet with the accompaniment of drummer Lambe Petrovski."

Croatian ethnomusicologist Dr Vinko Zganec wrote "The clarinet was as effective an accompaniment to the large drum in the folk dance from Kozjak as it was to the small drum in the folk dance "Teškoto" from Nižopole (Bitola). They provided a very effective combination." This appeared in an article entitled "Yugoslav Musical folklore at the Festival in Opatija". Yugoslav Folk Music Festival had been especially arranged by "Unions of Societies for Culture and Education of Yugoslavia" for the members of the Conference of The International Folk Music Council (IFMC) to studying folk music tradition and beauty and variety of Yugoslav folk art of 85 folk dance groups from Serbia, Bosnia and Herzegovina, Montenegro, Slovenia, Macedonia and Croatia which participated at this festival. "Every evening, for three hours or more, we witnessed an astonishing pageant of costume and custom, ritual and social dance, song and instrumental playing by 700 performers brought together from every part of the country. This was a world whose riches most of us had barely guessed at and, in this highly concentrated presentation, it was an overwhelming and unforgettable experience," written by Marie Slocombe and appeared in an article entitled, "Some Impression of the Yugoslav Conference and Festival" published by The International Folk Music Council (IFMC).

The Tanec Ensemble of folklore dances and songs of Macedonia was founded by the Government of the People's Republic of Macedonia in 1949 with an aim to collect, preserve and present the Macedonian folklore. Ensemble Tanec performed arranged version of folk melodies." On 20 January 1956, the Tanec ensemble arrived in the US, and their televised performance on CBS TV Programme Omnibus (U.S. TV series) on 22 January 1956 was viewed by millions people. It established the Tanec ensemble international stature and confirmation of this were reviews in the newspapers in North America for his 66 concerts:

On 27 January 1956, the Tanec Ensemble performed at Carnegie Hall in New York City. For this Carnegie Hall concert The New York Times music critic John Martin, wrote, "This particular group, part of a national movement toward the revival of the folk arts, comes from Macedonia … brilliantly spectacular and wonderfully unfamiliar dances … unforgettable pipe."

The New York Herald Tribune music critic Walter Terry, wrote, "Tanec, a Macedonian group of some forty dancers and musicians, gave generously of their rich folk heritage ... In "Sopska Poskocica", to make the point five young men took over the stage and indulged in show-off tactics to attract the girl ... An audience which jammed Carnegie to capacity cheered and applauded the folk dancing with as much enthusiasm as if it had been witnessing classical, theatrical ballet at its most glittering".

Stjepan Pucak, former Tanjug correspondent and Croatian journalist note: "To choose which were the most successful of the program's seventeen folk dances, when all were greeted with stormy applause, is really very difficult and risky ... "Sopska Poskocica" was even repeated, and to repeat a performance on the American stage is a really rare and exclusive event."

Naum Nachevski, journalist of the newspaper Nova Makedonija, Skopje, People’s Republic of Macedonia note: "The audience interrupted some of the folk dance performances with applause; these dances in particular left great impressions of the folklore … the unusual rhythm of Macedonian folk music. The "Tanec" ensemble not only received a warm welcome from the New York public, but also from the New York press."

The New York Times music critic John Martin, on 5 February 1956, wrote, "There is an amazing variety to the dances that comprised this particular program … the broken circles of the kolo of the Macedonian mountains … a dateless reed pipe".

Tanec's North American tour began with their debut on CBS TV Programme Omnibus (U.S. TV series) on 22 January 1956. Their first live US television performance was taped on videocassette and archived at the Library of Congress in Washington, D.C., and in Catalog Record is written description content: "The Yugoslav national folk ballet / directed by Elliot Silverstein; with the Tanec dance troupe from Macedonia (20 min.)"

For the concerts at The Civic Opera House in Chicago, Illinois on 4–5 February 1956, The Chicago Daily Tribune reviewer, Claudia Cassidy, noted: "… called Tanec, which is the Macedonian word for dance, this group of 37 dancers, singers and musicians is a kaleidoscope of the Balkans ... When five of them dance the "Sopska Poskocica", which apparently just means they are showing off to the girls. I would keep them any day as an unfair trade for the four little swans in Swan Lake."

For the concert at The Academy of Music in Philadelphia, Pennsylvania on 7 February 1956, The Philadelphia Inquirer music critic Samuel Singer commented, "'Tanec' means 'dance', but 'dance' in a larger form than customary. Besides dance alone, it conveys drama, ritual, tradition, songs, even military maneuvers ... there was a remarkable precision in both dancing and playing ... Clarinet, bass fiddle, violin, drums, guitar and flute provided most of the accompaniments in various combinations."

For the concert at The Constitution Hall in Washington, D.C., on 9 February 1956, Paul Hume, the Washington Post and Times music critic observed, "A "Sopska Poskocica" is devised to show the girls how handsome and wonderful and brilliant and exciting and sensational their man friends are. The rate at which it is danced, and the tremendous energy and precision of six men who dance it, is unique and demanded a repetition."

For the concert at Massey Hall in Toronto, Ontario, Canada, on 13 February 1956, John Kraglund, a music critic for The Globe and Mail wrote: "The first impression, however, must be one of rhythmic precision ... Nor was the performance without spectacle ... in the case of one dance, Sopska Poskocica, it was no more than a show-off dance. As such it was highly effective."

For the concert at The War Memorial Opera House in San Francisco, California on 7 March 1956, San Francisco Chronicle music critic R. H. Hagan says, "… in a number titled simply "Macedonian Tune", which in its intricate rhythms and plaintive melody should at least make Dave Brubeck send out an emergency call for Darius Milhaud".

For the concert at The Philharmonic Auditorium in Los Angeles, California on 12 March 1956, Los Angeles Times music critic Albert Goldberg commented: "For authentic folk dancing, wild and free and yet subject to its own intricate disciplines, this group would be hard to beat ...They are accompanied by a group of musicians consisting of a violinist, guitar and accordion players, a flutist, a clarinetist and double bass, though drums of different types are frequently involved, as well as a shepherd's reed pipe".

Dance Observer commented: "The capacity audience at Carnegie Hall on January 27 for the single New York performance of Tanec, the Yugoslav National Folk Ballet, enjoyed a fascinating cross-section of over 2000 years of human history and culture. Tanec is a Macedonian group".

After the end of the tour the Life commented: "A hundred years ago on the rugged roads of Macedonia, bands of brigands used to plunder the caravans of rich merchants and, like Robin Hood, pass on some of their spoils to the poor ... this spring, the Yugoslav National Folk Ballet is making a first, and highly successful tour of the U.S ... Together they make as vigorous a display of dancing as the U.S. has ever seen."

Craig Harris at Allmusic noted for The Tanec Ensemble and clarinetist Tale Ognenovski, "The ensemble reached their peak during the late '50s, when influential clarinet and pipes player Tale Ognenovski was a member."

Notable members of the Tanec Ensemble include clarinetist and composer Tale Ognenovski – Tale Ognenovski performed as clarinet and reed pipe (recorder) soloist with Ensemble Tanec during their tour of : United States of America and Canada (66 concerts, between 22 January 1956 and 12 April 1956 including on the Ford Foundation TV Programme Omnibus (U.S. TV series) on 22 January 1956 on CBS and concert on 27 January 1956 at Carnegie Hall in New York City); Germany (72 concerts from 15 August until 27 October 1956); France (83 concerts from 20 September until 25 November 1959); Switzerland (4 concerts from 7–10 July 1959).

For the contribution of Tale Ognenovski to the Tanec's North American tour, his biographer Stevan Ognenovski in the book entitled Tale Ognenovski Virtuoso of the Clarinet and Composer / Тале Огненовски виртуоз на кларинет и композитор (2000), noted: "Tale Ognenovski was clarinet soloist in "Sopska Poskocica" but he also helped arrange the music for he added his own improvisations to some parts of the dance ... Ensemble Tanec performed 66 concerts ... They were described as a Great Cultural Event by the American press."

Tale Ognenovski as a clarinet soloist performed the Macedonian folk dances "Zhensko Chamche" and "Beranche" with Ensemble Tanec in Vardar Film's 1955 production of "Ritam i zvuk (Rhythm and Sound)".

Ensemble Tanec during their tour of France from 20 September until 25 November 1959. They performed 83 concerts in 58 towns and cities in France. The Ensemble twice had performances broadcast on television, on 21 and 22 September 1959: 20 million people would have seen them on the most popular programme on French Television. Radio Paris recorded a 45-minute programme of Macedonian folk dances and songs.

In a 1964 interview, for the newspaper "Večer", Skopje, People's Republic of Macedonia Raymond Guillier, The Manager of Ensemble Tanec's tour of France (from Paris, France) commented: "Everyone who went to the concerts by Ensemble Tanec in France was fascinated … Tanec is playing in the spirit of Macedonia, no other Ensemble in the world can perform ... Your girls and boys put their whole heart into the dance and example of this is clarinetist Tale Ognenovski."

For the concert of The Tanec ensemble at "Grand Palais" in Bourges, France on 23 September 1959, newspaper "La nouvelle republique du Centre" commented: "The first performance of the National Ballet of Macedonia was a tremendous success. Everyone in the hall applauded with enthusiasm, here in the 'Grand Palais' in Bourges at the first performance in France ... The members of the National Ballet of Macedonia arrived four days ago in Paris and have been shown on television," and newspaper "Le Berry Republicain" commented: "The quality and talent of this group is admirable ... This is the first time that they have performed in France ... At the end of their concert, the members of Ensemble Tanec remained on stage and were applauded by the Bourges audiences for more than a quarter of an hour."

The concerts of the Tanec ensemble were performed in Berne on 7 and 8 July 1959 and in Geneva on 9 and 10 July 1959. Tale Ognenovski made his debut on a special programme broadcast on Swiss Television. Playing as clarinet soloist, he performed his personally composed Macedonian folk dances "Bitolsko oro" and "Brusnichko oro". For the concert of The Tanec ensemble at Port Gitana Bellevue, Geneva on 10 July 1959, newspaper "Tribune de Geneve" commented: "We were presented with remarkable spectacles performed by the Yugoslavian National Folk Ballet 'Tanec' from Macedonia ... Nothing here that resembled classical dances of our Western World ... They have the rhythm of the dances of their country in their blood...."

Tale Ognenovski was included in the book The Greatest Clarinet Players of All Time: Top 100 by Alex Trost and Vadim Kravetsky. Mi2n Music Industry News Network published an article entitled, "Clarinetist Tale Ognenovski Is Included in the Book Entitled "The Greatest Clarinet Players of All Time: Top 100" By Alex Trost And Vadim Kravetsky, Publisher: CreateSpace.""

== Classical music ==
=== Mokranjac School of Music ===
The Mokranjac School of Music was established in Skopje in 1934. In addition to its well-respected choir, it was famous for the people that were involved in its establishment, composers like Trajko Prokopiev and Todor Skalovski.

=== Post-WWII ===
After the formation of the PR Macedonia, the Macedonian Philharmonic Orchestra was established in 1944, while in 1947 the Association of Musicians of Macedonia was created. Shortly after that, the first Macedonian radio concert was made, conducted by Todor Skalovski.

During the 1950s, the first Macedonian ballet by Gligor Smokvarski and opera Goce by Kiril Makedonski were produced. The period after these brought a relative renaissance of Macedonian music, focussed on innovation. The most prominent composers in this period are Zivko Firfov, Trajko Prokopiev, Stefan Gajdov, Todor Skalovski, Petre Bogdanov Kocko, Vlastimir Nikolovski, Blagoja Ivanovski, Tomislav Zografski, Toma Prosev and Mihajlo Nikolovski. Among the most prominent music artists in this period are the opera singers Danka Firfova, Pavlina Apostolova, Georgi Bozikov and Zina Krelja, and the pianist Ladislav Palfi. Firfova was one of the first trained sopranos in Macedonia and debuted in 1947 as Santuzza in a Macedonian-language version of the Cavalleria Rusticana, the first opera ever sung in Macedonian.

The "Macedonian National Police Wind Orchestra" comprising about 30 musicians and conducted by Micho Kostovski was established in 1949. In December 1952, Tale Ognenovski as clarinet soloist, together with pianist Nino Cipušev as accompaniment, performed the classical concert "Concert Polka for Clarinet" by Miler Bela in the "Police House" in Skopje with outstanding success and he became the first clarinet soloist in the history of country to perform a classical concert for the clarinet. On 24 May 1953 he played clarinet soloist in the classical concert "Concert Polka for Clarinet" by Miler Bela with Gligor Smokvarski's arrangement for the "Public Police Wind Orchestra", comprising about 30 musicians and conducted by Micho Kostovski. The concert was performed in the Radio Skopje building, and broadcast directly to the nation via Radio Skopje (now Macedonian Radio Television).

Tale Ognenovski and his son Stevan Ognenovski arranged for two clarinets Clarinet Concerto in A Major, K.622, composed by Wolfgang Amadeus Mozart and recorded the albums: Mozart and Ognenovski Clarinet Concertos and Mozart Clarinet Concerto in A, K. 622 Arranged for Two Clarinets by Tale Ognenovski. Perhaps these two albums are unique recordings of this concert with two clarinets where first clarinet with first arrangement and second clarinet with second arrangement that's played simultaneously – by one performer (Tale Ognenovski). Top40-Charts News published the articles entitled, "Tale Ognenovski, Internationally Renowned Jazz And Classical Clarinetist Released CD Album Entitled: Mozart And Ognenovski Clarinet Concertos To Celebrate The 250th Anniversary of Mozart's Birthday" on 13 November 2006, and "Mozart and Ognenovski Is the Best Clarinet Concertos in the World" on 21 November 2014 Mi2n Music Industry News Network published an article entitled, "New Digital Album of Clarinetist And Composer Tale Ognenovski: "Mozart Clarinet Concerto in A, K. 622 Arranged For Two Clarinets By Tale Ognenovski" on 27 April 2017.

=== Today ===
Today, one of the most prominent classical music artists is the pianists Simon Trpčeski, also notable opera singers include Neven Siljanovski, Blagoj Nacoski, Ana Durlovski, Igor Durlovski and Boris Trajanov. From the diaspora, a notable performer is the Australian born, but Macedonian pianist Hristijan Spirovski. The most prominent conductors include Borjan Canev, Sasho Tatarchevski, Bisera Chadlovska and Oliver Balaburski, and the most notable instrumentalist are the violinists Ljubisha Kirovski, Oleg Kondratenko and Russian born Anna Kondratenko, the saxophonist Ninoslav Dimov, the clarinetist Stojan Dimov, the bassists Velko Todevski and Petrus Petrusevski, the oboists Tome Atanasov, Vasil Atanasov and Gordana Josifova-Nedelkovska. Among the composers are Darija Andovska, Jana Andreevska, Goce Kolarovski, Tome Mancev, Stojan Stojkov, Damjan Temkov, Valentina Velkovska, Soni Petrovski, Goran Nachevski, Boris Svetiev, Ljubomir Brangjolica, Michael Bakrnčev and the composer, but also a performer, musicologist and researcher, Dimitrije Bužarovski.

== Popular music ==
=== Pop music ===
Popular pop music performers in North Macedonia include: Toše Proeski (the most prominent Macedonian singer), Karolina Gočeva, Maja Odžaklievska, Ljupka Dimitrovska, Rebeka, Gjoko Gjorchev, Elena Risteska, Andrea, Vlatko Ilievski, Vlatko Lozanoski, DNK, Dani Dimitrovska, Kaliopi, Tamara Todevska, Vrcak, Robert Bilbilov, Lambe Alabakoski, Jovan Jovanov, Andrijana Janevska, Kristina Arnaudova, Aco Andonov and others. Notable composers, producers and arrangers involved in the pop music scene are Darko Dimitrov, Damir Imeri, Aleksandar Masevski, and Grigor Koprov. Many artists are famous as both singer and songwriter such as Jovan Jovanov and Miyatta.

The first examples of Macedonian pop music appeared in the mid-20th century and was called "zabavna muzika". The most famous old-generation performers are Zafir Hadzimanov, Verica Risteska, Dragan Mijalkovski and many others. According to style, Macedonian pop music is a Western type of pop music, with influences of folk and oriental music. Several fusion genres such as pop-rock, pop-rap, ethnopop, and pop-folk also have developed.

=== Music festivals ===
Major music festivals in North Macedonia include Skopje Fest in Skopje, Ohrid Fest in Ohrid, MakFest in Štip, Interfest in Bitola, Dfest in Star Dojran.

North Macedonia debuted as an independent state at the Eurovision Song Contest 1998. So far, its highest placing was seventh in Eurovision Song Contest 2019 final which altogether was overall best result in televoting years.

=== Rock music ===
The most successful and influential rock band in North Macedonia and one of the most popular in Western Balkans was Leb i Sol. They combined rock music with fusion jazz and traditional music elements creating a distinct sound of their own, becoming one of the top acts of the Western Balkans. After they broke up, the guitarist Vlatko Stefanovski, the bassist Bodan Arsovski, the keyboard player Kokan Dimuševski and the drummer Garabet Tavitijan all started successful solo careers, each in his own right. In 2006 they gathered again for a reunion tour to mark 30th anniversary since their beginning as a band. In 2008, a different line-up recorded a new album, I taka nataka without Stefanovski's and Tavitjan's participation.

Other notable group was Bisbez, which was influenced by The Beatles and other 1960s artists. It was formed in 1964 by merging two previously existing bands Biseri (meaning Pearls) and Bezimeni (Nameless). During the 1970s notable groups were Pu, Madrigali, Ilinden 903, Den za Den, Leva patika, Triangl, Torr and others. Most of them were into hard rock, progressive rock, folk rock, symphonic rock, jazz rock and funk rock. The late 1970s saw the emergence of punk rock. The first punk rock band was Fol Jazik, formed in Skopje in 1979. During the 1980s other notable punk groups were Saraceni and Badmingtons, both led by Vladimir Petrovski Karter. Later he switched to a more mainstream sound and formed the group Aleksandar Makedonski (Alexander of Macedon). The new wave scene featured artists such as the ska group Cilindar, Usta na usta and Tokmu taka. Tokmu taka's vocalist Ljupčo Bubo Karov from Kavadarci later became popular as an actor of the comedy TV show K-15, while Usta na usta's member Aleksandar Prokopiev became a prominent writer. Another influential band was Bon Ton Bend with Dario Pankovski, who released many hits of new wave music. Notable heavy metal artists were the groups Karamela and Concorde, the latter being remembered for their more radio-friendly hit "Visoki štikli i crni čorapi" ("High Heels and Black Stockings"). Its guitarist Venko Serafimov later started a successful solo career. The synthpop trio Bastion which featured Kiril Džajkovski was one of the most important 1980s acts. Another notable 1980's act was Haos in Laos. The pop-rock group Memorija formed in 1984 was one of the most prosperous from this period. The most productive in the country was the post-punk, darkwave and gothic rock scene which included the cult bands Mizar, Arhangel and Padot na Vizantija, the latter led by Goran Trajkoski and Klime Kovaceski. Later they formed the neo-folk group Anastasia which became internationally acclaimed with its soundtrack for the Milčo Mančevski's Academy Award-nominated film Before the Rain.

Notable artists during the first half of the 1990s music included the thrash metal group Sanatorium, the alternative rock bands Suns, Last Expedition, The Hip, Balkan Express, Decadence, Vodolija, Nikeja, the punk rockers Rok Agresori and Parketi, and D' Daltons, which was initially a rockabilly act. The second half of the decade saw the emergence of the hardcore punk bands Sidewalk, Fluks, Tank Warning Net, Smut, Bumbiks and No Name Nation, while notable extreme metal band was Siniac. In the 2000s, prominent acts included Superhiks (ska punk), Denny Te Chuva (melodic hardcore, emo), Smut (metalcore), Verka (folk metal), Two Sides (hardcore punk), Parketi (pop punk), Kulturno Umetnički Rabotnici (garage punk), Noviot početok (hardcore punk), Bernays Propaganda (indie-rock, post-punk revival) and others. Notable artists during the 2010s are Vizija (alternative/experimental rock), XaХаXa (punk rock), Molokai (Surf rock), Smoke shakers (indie rock), Chromatic point (progressive metal), Culture Development (post hardcore), Tempera (Alternative rock) and others. Notable all-female bands in the Macedonian scene were Royal Albert Hall and Vivid.

There are several rock music festivals, some of the most notable include: Taksirat annually organized by Lithium Records and the Skopje gori organized by Avalon Productions. Both of the festivals hosted numerous internationally acclaimed rock, electronica and hip hop acts. There are also smaller demo band festivals such as Winner Fest (formerly known as Loser Fest) and Rok-fest, the latter has existed for several decades. The most notable international open-air festival was Alarm held in Ljubaništa by the Ohrid Lake in 2002. In 1994 a peace festival called Urban fest was organized in Skopje gathering underground music artists from all the Balkan countries.

In 2025, a music festival was organized by the noise-rock band Korka in Kočani, in remembrance of the victims of the fire that erupted in March of that year.

=== Hip hop ===
A well-developed hip hop music scene also exists. Thriving through street dance competitions, graffiti art, and underground battles in cities like Skopje, the capital. The genre continues to gain prominence, especially among younger generations.

=== Electronic scene ===
The most prominent electronic musicians are Kiril Džajkovski (a former member of Bastion), Galoski, the PMG Collective, Robotek, Novogradska and Gotra. North Macedonia has a developed clubbing scene especially in Skopje. Several festivals featuring foreign DJs take place in the country, many of them on the Ohrid Lake during the summer season. Psychedelic trance is one of the most popular electronic genres in North Macedonia, and there is large number of internationally popular and successful psytrance acts from Macedonia, for example Imaginary Sight, Fobi, Kala, Yudhisthira, AntHill (joined project of Kala and Yudhisthira), Blisargon Demogorgon, Atriohm, Zopmanika, Demoniac Insomniac, Egorythmia, Galactic Explorers, Djantrix, Spirit Architect, Tengri, etc.

=== Jazz ===
The Macedonian jazz scene is highly appreciated as well. Famous and celebrated jazz musicians and bands include: guitarist Toni Kitanovski, vibraphonist Zoran Madžirov, pianists Dragan Soldatovic – Labish and Simon Kiselicki, bands like Tavitjan Brothers, Sethstat, Letecki Pekinezeri, La Colonie Volvox among others. The Skopje Jazz Festival is held annually.

In September 2008, Tale Ognenovski Quartet released CD album: Macedonian Clarinet Jazz Composed by Tale Ognenovski. All About Jazz published article entitled: "New CD 'Macedonian Clarinet Jazz Composed By Tale Ognenovski of Internationally Renowned Jazz, Folk Dance And Classical Clarinetist" on 27 September 2008 at his website.

"…lively discussion about clarinetist Tale Ognenovski, which segued to the proliferation of New York bands interpreting Balkan music," wrote JazzTimes music critic Bill Shoemaker in an article entitled "Dave Douglas: Parallel Worlds", appearing in the website of JazzTimes on 3 January 1998.

Jazzclub Unterfahrt from Munich, Bavaria, Germany commented: "Playing the music of clarinetist Tale Ognenovski is different from imitating Michael Breckers style."

All About Jazz celebrated 27 April 2009, the birthday of Tale Ognenovski with All About Jazz recognition: Jazz Musician of the Day: Tale Ognenovski, with announcement published at his website.

=== Children's music ===
One of the most notable children's music festivals is Zlatno slavejče (Golden Nightingale) annually held in Skopje, which has a long tradition in North Macedonia. Other festivals include Si-Do in Bitola Kalinka in Gevgelija and Super Zvezda, also in Skopje. Notable composers of children's songs, producers and arrangers include Mile Sherdenkov, Dragan Karanfilovski Bojs, Miodrag and Marjan Nečak, Kire Kostov, Petar Sidovski, Slave Dimitrov, Milko Lozanovski, Aleksandar Džambazov, Ljupčo Mirkovski, Darko Mijalkovski and others. Several TV shows featuring children music exist. The country also takes part in the Junior Eurovision Song Contest and recently achieved the best result- 5th place for their 2007 entry at the Junior Eurovision Song Contest 2007.

== See also ==
- Esma Redžepova, eminent musician of Romani ethnicity from North Macedonia.
- List of radio stations in North Macedonia

== Sources ==
- Burton, Kim (2000). "Tricky Rhythms". In Broughton, Simon; Ellingham, Mark; McConnachie, James; Duane, Orla (eds.). World Music, Vol. 1: Africa, Europe and the Middle East. Rough Guides Ltd, Penguin Books. pp. 202–206. ISBN 1-85828-636-0.
- Bechev, Dimitar (2019). Historical Dictionary of North Macedonia. Rowman & Littlefield. p. 212. ISBN 978-1538119624.
- Islam, Aida (2020). "Firfova, Danka". Oxford Music Online.
- Ognenovski, Stevan (1998a). "The Official Tale Ognenovski Website".
- Ognenovski, Stevan (2000). Tale Ognenovski, virtuoso of the clarinet and composer Тале Огненовски виртуоз на кларинет и композитор. Skopje, Republic of Macedonia: Matica Makedonska. ISBN 9989-48-312-4 – via Library of Congress.
- Ognenovski, Stevan (2000b). "Biography Book: "Tale Ognenovski Virtuoso of the Clarinet and Composer" "Тале Огненовски виртуоз на кларинет и композитор" – Official Tale Ognenovski Website".
- Ognenovski, Stevan (1955). "Ensemble Tanec performing in Vardar Film's 1955 production of "Ritam i zvuk (Rhythm and Sound) – Official Tale Ognenovski Website".
- Ognenovski, Stevan (1998b). "Tour of North America – Official Tale Ognenovski Website".
- Martin, John (28 January 1956). "Ballet: Yugoslav Folk Art 'Tanec' Dancers Appear at Carnegie Hall in Display of Tremendous Skill". The New York Times.
- Martin, John (5 February 1956). "The Dance: Folk Art; Group From Yugoslavia in Impressive Debut Learning vs. Magic No Macedonian Monopoly The Week's Events". The New York Times.
- Pucak, Stjepan (7 February 1956). "Првите денови во Америка – First days in America". Nova Makedonija. Skopje, Republic of Macedonia.
- Nachevski, Naum (31 January 1956). ""Танец" ја одушеви њујоршката публика – "Tanec" had amazed The New York Public". Nova Makedonija. Skopje, Republic of Macedonia.
- Ognenovski, Stevan (2014). "Articles published at The New York Times for performance of clarinetist Tale Ognenovski at Carnegie Hall, New York City on January 27, 1956 – Official Tale Ognenovski Website".
- Ognenovski, Stevan (2014c). "Clarinetist Tale Ognenovski with Macedonian National Ensemble for Folk Dances and Songs "Tanec" performed at CBS TV, Columbia Broadcast System on January 22, 1956.- Official Tale Ognenovski Website".
- Saudek, Robert (22 January 1956). "Omnibus. IV, vol. 15 / TV-Radio Workshop of the Ford Foundation, CBS Television Network, 1956-01-22". Library of Congress Catalog Record.
- "Ritam i zvuk (Rhythm and sound) YouTube music video – Film: Ritam i zvuk (Rhythm and sound))". Vardar Film. 1955. Archived from the original on 21 December 2021.
- "Film: "Ritam i zvuk" (Rhythm and sound)". IMDb. 1955.
- "Dance, Bouncing Brigands, Yugoslavs come to U.S". Life (magazine). 9 April 1956.
- Ognenovski, Stevan (2014f). "Life magazine article for Tale Ognenovski performances as clarinet and reed pipe soloist with Macedonian National Ensemble for Folk Dances and Songs "Tanec" on North America tour in 1956.- Official Tale Ognenovski Website".
- "REVIEWS OF Yugoslav National Folk Ballet Carnegie Hall January 27, 1956". Dance Observer, Volumes 23–24, pp. 55. New York City. 1956.
- Terry, Walter (28 January 1956). "Yugoslav Folk Ballet". New York Herald Tribune. New York City, US.
- Cassidy, Claudia (6 February 1956). "On the Aisle – Yugoslav Ballet a Colorful Addition to International Dance". Chicago Daily Tribune. Archived from the original on 4 October 2012.
- Singer, Samuel (8 February 1956). "Yugoslav Ballet Visits Academy". The Philadelphia Inquirer.
- Hume, Paul (10 February 1956). "Yugoslav Dancers Shoot the Works". Washington Post and Times. Archived from the original on 4 October 2012.
- Hagan, R. H. (8 March 1956). "Yugoslav Ballet Proves Folk Dancing 'Tricky'". San Francisco Chronicle.
- Goldberg, Albert (13 March 1956). "Yugoslav Folk Ballet Opens Engagement". Los Angeles Times. Archived from the original on 4 October 2012.
- Kraglund, John (14 February 1956). "Music in Toronto". The Globe and Mail. Toronto, Ontario, Canada.
- Ognenovski, Stevan (2016b). "Tale Ognenovski, The Greatest Clarinetist of All Time, Musical Genius, Composer..." YouTube. Archived from the original on 21 December 2021.
- Harris, Craig (2009). "Biography of Ensemble Tanec". Allmusic.
- "Dans les jardins illumines de Port Gitana Bellevue, Ballets Nationaux Folkloriques Yougoslaves: Tanetz, deux heures d'un somptueux spectacle – In the illuminated gardens of Port Gitana Bellevue, National Yugoslav Folklore Ballet Tanec, two hours of sumptuous spectacle". Tribune de Geneve. Geneve, Switzerland. 8 July 1959.
- Mt, Ed (11 July 1959). "A Port-Gitana les ballets nationaux yougoslaves – In Port-Gitana, National Yugoslav Folklore Ballet". Tribune de Geneve. Geneve, Switzerland.
- Ognenovski, Stevan (1998e). "Tour of Switzerland – Official Tale Ognenovski Website".
- Ognenovski, Stevan (1998d). "Tour of Germany – Official Tale Ognenovski Website".
- Ognenovski, Stevan (1998c). "Tour of France – Official Tale Ognenovski Website".
- "Hier soir au GRAND-PALAIS BRILLANTE "PREMIERE" des Ballets de Macedoine – Yesterday evening in GRAND-PALAIS Brilliant first performance of National Ballet of Macedonia". Le Berry Republicain. Bourges, France. 24 September 1959.
- "Hier soir a Bourges, La "premiere" nationale des Ballets de Macedoine a remporte un enorme succes – Yesterday evening in Bourges, The first national Ballet of Macedonia achieved tremendous success". La nouvelle republique du Centre. Bourges, France. 24 September 1959.
- Ognenovski, Stevan (2000c). Tale Ognenovski, virtuoso of the clarinet and composer of Macedonian folk dances, jazz and classical music : biography and music notation of compositions of Macedonian folk dances, jazz and classical music. Skopje : Matica Makedonska, 2000. ISBN 9989-48-312-4. OCLC 977992154 – via WorldCat.
- Ognenovski, Stevan (2019). "Web page of Stevan Ognenovski, Mag.Scient. - Official Tale Ognenovski Website".
- Georgievski, M. (14 September 1964). "Your dance fascinates me Вашата игра ме фасцинира". Vecher. Skopje, People’s Republic of Macedonia.
- "Еден прилог поднесен во Истанбул ја заинтересира и пошироката светска јавност за чалгиско музицирање – One item of music material presented in Istanbul creates great interest in the world about "Chalgii" music"". Ekran. Skopje, Republic of Macedonia. 2 December 1977.
- Ognenovski, Stevan (1998g). "International Folklore Conference in Istanbul, Turkey – Official Tale Ognenovski Website".
- "Tale Ognenovski, Internationally Renowned Jazz And Classical Clarinetist Released CD Album Entitled: Mozart And Ognenovski Clarinet Concertos To Celebrate The 250th Anniversary of Mozart's Birthday". Top40-Charts News. 13 November 2006.
- "Mozart And Ognenovski Is The Best Clarinet Concertos in the World". Top40-Charts News. 21 November 2014.
- "New Digital Album of Clarinetist And Composer Tale Ognenovski: "Mozart Clarinet Concerto in A, K. 622 Arranged For Two Clarinets By Tale Ognenovski"". Music Industry News Network. 27 April 2017.
- "New CD "Macedonian Clarinet Jazz Composed by Tale Ognenovski" of Internationally Renowned Jazz, Folk Dance and Classical Clarinetist". All About Jazz Publicity. 27 September 2008.
- Horner, Neil (3 November 2003). "Tale Ognenovski Musical genius: Jazz, Macedonian Folk Dances and Classical Music". MusicWeb International.
- Ognenovski, Stevan (1998h). "Magazine "Ilustrovana Politika" – Official Tale Ognenovski Website".
- "Нове плоче, Македонска ора – New Records, Macedonian Folk Dances". Magazine "Ilustrovana Politika". Belgrade, Serbia. 1979.
- Ognenovski, Stevan (1998l). "LP 1439 PGP RTB – Official Tale Ognenovski Website".
- Broughton, Simon (2000). Rough Guide to World Music Volume One: Africa, Europe & The Middle East, subtitle "Kim Burton: Macedonia – Tricky Rhythms", pp 202–206. England: Rough Guides. ISBN 1858286352.
- "Clarinetist Tale Ognenovski - Jazz Musician of The Day: April 27, 2009 At AllAboutJazz.com". Music Industry News Network. 25 June 2009.
- Slocombe, Marie (March 1952). "Some Impression of the Yugoslav Conference and Festival". Journal of the International Folk Music Council. Vol. IV. London, UK: International Folk Music Council. pp. 1–2.
- "Programme Notes on the Dances and Songs Performed at the Yugoslav Folk Music Festival – Macedonia (presented by 23 villages)". Journal of the International Folk Music Council, Vol. IV, page 60-64. London, UK: International Folk Music Council. March 1952.
- Ognenovski, Stevan (1998k). "First Award in Opatija, Croatia, 1951 – Official Tale Ognenovski Website".
- Trost, Alex (2013). The Greatest Clarinet Players of All Time: Top 100. United States: CreateSpace. ISBN 978-1492255277.
- Ognenovski, Stevan (2001). "CD: "Jazz, Macedonian Folk Dances and Classical Music" – Official Tale Ognenovski Website".
- Ognenovski, Stevan (2006). "CD: "Mozart and Ognenovski Clarinet Concertos" – Official Tale Ognenovski Website".
- Ognenovski, Stevan (2008). "CD: "Macedonian Clarinet Jazz Composed By Tale Ognenovski" – Official Tale Ognenovski Website".
- Ognenovski, Stevan (2017a). "CD: "Mozart Clarinet Concerto in A, K. 622 Arranged for Two Clarinets by Tale Ognenovski" – Official Tale Ognenovski Website".
- Ognenovski, Stevan (1998q). "Classical Music since 1952 – Official Tale Ognenovski Website".
- "Tale Ognenovski, Internationally Renowned Jazz And Classical Clarinetist Released CD Album Entitled: Mozart And Ognenovski Clarinet Concertos". Music Industry News Network. 12 November 2006.
- "Clarinetist Tale Ognenovski Is Included in the Book Entitled "The Greatest Clarinet Players of All Time: Top 100" By Alex Trost And Vadim Kravetsky, Publisher: CreateSpace". Music Industry News Network. 21 November 2014.
- Ognenovski, Stevan (1999t). "ULS-578, Macedonian Radio-Television, Republic of Macedonia – Official Tale Ognenovski Website".
- "Pachora". Jazzclub Unterfahrt Munich. Germany. 23 March 2004.
- Shoemaker, Bill (January 1998). Jazz Times, Volume 28, Issues 2–5; Dave Douglas: Parallel Worlds. The University of Michigan.
- "Jazz Musician of the Day – April 27, 2009: Tale Ognenovski". All About Jazz. 27 April 2009.
- Dimitrovski, Dushko (1994). За Наша Музика – For Our Music, pp 114–116. Skopje, Republic of Macedonia: BID "Misirkov". ISBN 9989-600-01-5.
- Ognenovski, Stevan (2019b). TALE OGNENOVSKI VIRTUOSO OF THE CLARINET AND COMPOSER, BIOGRAPHY AND MUSIC NOTATION OF 69 CLARINET COMPOSITIONS: MACEDONIAN FOLK DANCES, JAZZ AND CLASSICAL MUSIC. Seattle, Washington, United States: Kindle Direct Publishing. ISBN 978-1708334024.
- Ognenovski, Stevan (2019a). "Book: "TALE OGNENOVSKI VIRTUOSO OF THE CLARINET AND COMPOSER, BIOGRAPHY AND MUSIC NOTATION OF 69 CLARINET COMPOSITIONS: MACEDONIAN FOLK DANCES, JAZZ AND CLASSICAL MUSIC " - Official Tale Ognenovski Website".
- "Biography: "Tale Ognenovski Virtuoso of the Clarinet And Composer, Biography And Music Notation of 69 Clarinet Compositions: Macedonian Folk Dances, Jazz And Classical Music"". Music Industry News Network. 22 November 2019.
- Wilson, Dave (2019). "Shaping the Past and Creating the Future: Music, Nationalism, and the Negotiation of Cultural Memory at Macedonia's Celebration of Twenty Years of Independence". Music and Politics. 13 (2). doi:10.3998/mp.9460447.0013.202. hdl:2027/spo.9460447.0013.202.
- Zganec, Vinko (October 1951). "Yugoslav Musical folklore at the Festival in Opatija". Kulturni radnik. Vol. 10–11. Zagreb, Croatia.
