= Zemjo Makedonska =

Macedonian contemporary folk-style song

"Zemjo Makedonska" (Macedonian: Земјо Македонска; English: Macedonian Land) is a Macedonian contemporary folk-style song written by folk singer Vaska Ilieva with her first television performance in 1959. The song has been interpreted by many singers.

== History ==
The song was written by folk singer Vaska Ilieva during the 1950s. According to Tribuna, the lyrics of the song are based on a poem by Bulgarian author Ivan Vazov from 1877, dedicated to the Montenegrin–Ottoman War (1876–78). One interpretation of this song was by Ilieva. Zoran Džorlev, a managing director of the ensemble Tanec, had also produced and arranged a version of the song. The song was also interpreted by Suzana Spasovska, Simeon Gugulovski, Duško Georgievski, Vlado Janevski, Elena Andonovska, Ognen Zdravkovski, and Kazuhiro Kotetsu. The American ensemble Tamburitzans performed the song in 2019.

== See also ==
- Music of North Macedonia
