= List of guitar synthesizer players =

A number of guitarists have used guitar/synthesizers, which are musical instruments which allow a guitar player to play synthesizers. Many guitar/synth performers are either jazz, progressive rock, metal or fusion guitarists, including:

- John Abercrombie
- Jan Akkerman
- Randy Bachman
- Jeff Baxter
- Kurt Rosenwinkel
- Adrian Belew
- Matt Bellamy
- Ritchie Blackmore
- Dave Brock
- Dean Brown
- Bugo
- David Byrne
- Eric Clapton
- J.J. Cale
- Bootsy Collins (bass guitar)
- Amir Derakh
- Al Di Meola
- K. K. Downing
- Les Fradkin
- Peter Frampton
- Russ Freeman
- Robert Fripp
- Susumu Hirasawa
- Bill Frisell
- Reeves Gabrels
- Jerry Garcia
- David Gilmour
- Jason Gobel
- Steve Hackett
- Chuck Hammer
- Steve Harris (bass guitar)
- Bob Hartman
- Steve Hillage
- Allan Holdsworth
- Brian Hughes
- Ryo Kawasaki
- Phil Keaggy
- Maynard James Keenan
- Közi
- Shawn Lane
- Alex Lifeson
- Liam Lynch
- Jeff Lynne
- Mana
- Paul Masvidal
- Bret McKenzie
- John McLaughlin
- Tony McPhee
- Pat Metheny
- Dragomir Milenković
- Joni Mitchell
- Steve Morse
- Dave Murray
- Bill Nelson
- Mike Oldfield
- Jimmy Page
- Prince
- Lou Reed
- Vernon Reid
- Sheldon Reynolds
- Lee Ritenour
- Omar Rodríguez-López
- Jordan Rudess
- Mike Rutherford
- Karl Sanders
- Neal Schon
- Marc Schonbrun
- Adrian Smith
- Andy Summers
- Mike Stern
- Rob Swire
- Ronni Le Tekrø
- Glenn Tipton
- Roger Troutman
