= Jonče Hristovski =

Macedonian singer and composer

Jonče Hristovski Јонче Христовски
- Born: January 10, 1931 Bitola, Macedonia, Kingdom of Yugoslavia
- Died: April 5, 2000 (aged 69) Skopje, Macedonia
- Genres: Folk
- Occupations: Singer; composer

Jonče Hristovski (Macedonian: Јонче Христовски; born 10 January 1931 in Bitola – 5 April 2000 in Skopje) was a Macedonian singer and composer of folk music. During his career he gained a special reputation among the people as a communicative person and wonderful singer. Among his many successes, his most popular song is Makedonsko Devojče composed in 1964.

Besides his solo career, he has been singing and performing with the CA Tanec and he has been director of one show produced by the national Macedonian Television. He was also in a duet with Trpe Čerepovski and made songs like Abre Gjore Lažgo Gjore

Jonče Hristovski's wife died due to the Skopje earthquake of 1963 after giving birth to their twin daughters, Olgica and Nevenka.

== Songs ==
Among his many songs, most notable are:

- Makedonsko devojče
- Edno ime imame
- Živote moj
- Aj zasvirete mi čalgii
- Zapej pesna makedonska
- Ako umram il zaginam
