= Makedonsko devojče =

Macedonian folk song

"Makedonsko devojče Македонско девојче"

Song by Jonče Hristovski
- Released: 1964
- Recorded: 1964
- Genre: Folk
- Length: 3:02
- Songwriter: Jonče Hristovski

Makedonsko devojče (Macedonian: Македонско девојче) is a Macedonian song written and composed by Jonče Hristovski in the style of newly composed folk in 1964. The title directly translates as 'Macedonian girl' or 'Macedonian maiden'. The song is written in a 14/8 time signature, which is frequently used in Macedonian Folk.

== Lyrics ==
Makedonsko devojče as originally written consists of four stanzas.

External videos
- Macedonian girl official song and lyrics in Macedonian YouTube

English lyrics

First stanza:
Macedonian girl,
a beautiful bouquet,
picked in the garden,
given as a gift.

Chorus:
Is there, in this whole wide world,
a more beautiful girl than a Macedonian?
There isn’t, there isn’t, there will never be born,
a more beautiful girl than a Macedonian.

Second stanza:
There are no stars brighter
than your eyes,
If they were in the sky at night,
dawn will break out right.

Chorus: .....

Third stanza:
When you unravel your braids,
like silk,
you’re more beautiful
than a fairy.

Chorus: .....

Fourth stanza:
And when she sings a song
it is a voice sweeter than a nightingale
and when she dances oro
she will dance with all her heart.

Chorus: .....

Macedonian lyrics

Прва строфа:
Македонско девојче,
китка шарена,
во градина набрана
дар подарена.

Рефрен:
Дали има на овој бели свет
поубаво девојче од Македонче?
Нема, нема не ќе се роди
поубаво девојче од Македонче.

Втора строфа:
Нема ѕвезди полични,
од твоите очи,
да се ноќе на небо
ден ќе раздени.

Рефрен: .....

Трета строфа:
Кога коси расплетиш
како коприна
лична си и полична
од самовила.

Рефрен .....

Четврта строфа:
Кога песна запее
славеј натпее,
кога оро заигра
срце разигра.

Рефрен: .....

== See also ==
- Music of North Macedonia
