= Igor Durlovski =

Macedonian bass opera singer and politician

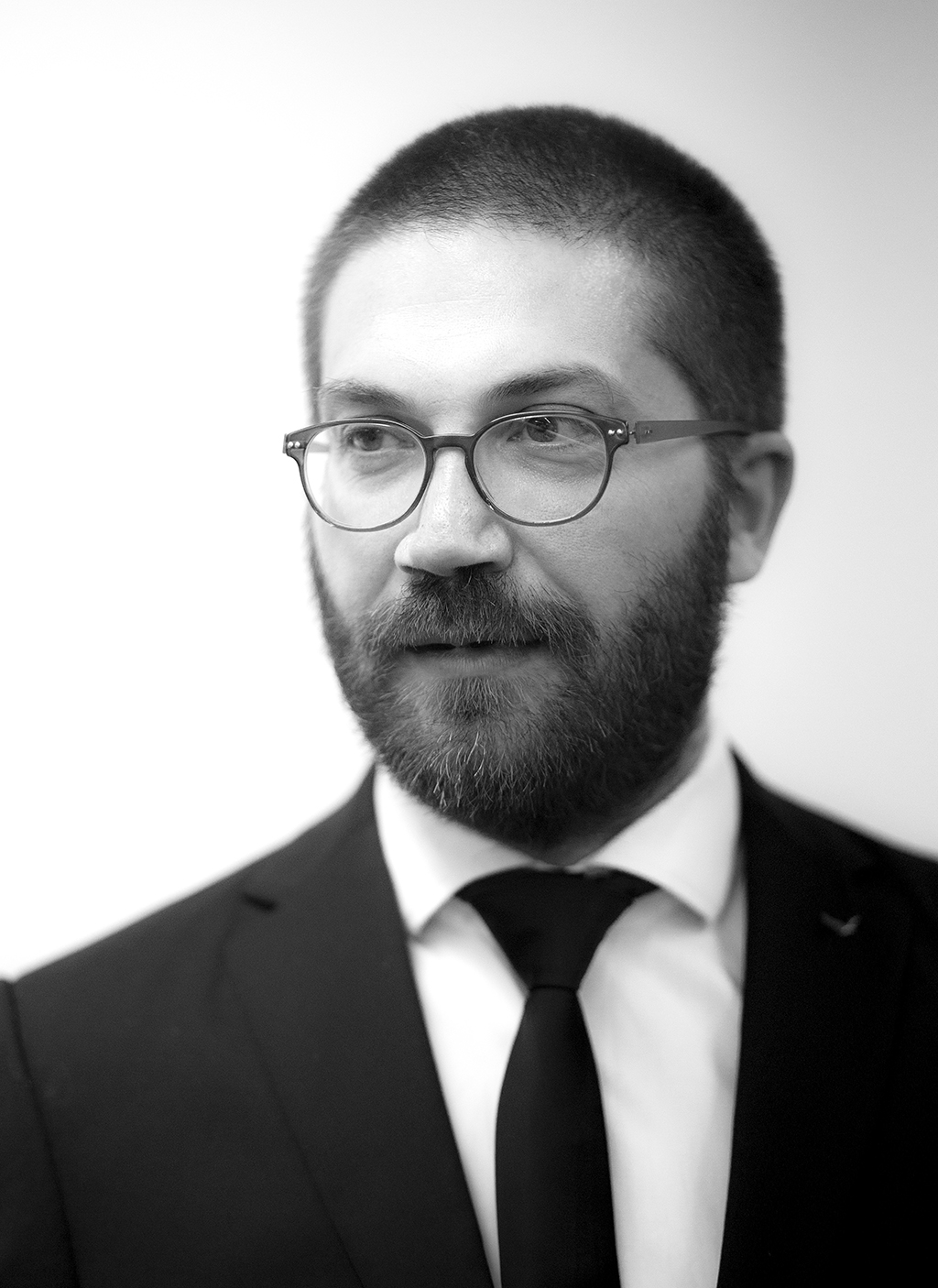
- Born: 26 March 1977 (age 49); Bitola, SR Macedonia, SFRY (now North Macedonia)
- Citizenship: Macedonian
- Education: Ss. Cyril and Methodius University in Skopje
- Occupation: Opera singer
- Known for: Member of the Assembly of North Macedonia
- Political party: Independent
- Spouse: Ana Durlovski

Igor Durlovski (Macedonian: Игор Дурловски, born 26 March 1977) is a Macedonian bass opera singer and politician.

== Life and career ==
Igor Durlovski was born in Bitola, SR Macedonia, part of SFR Yugoslavia, now Macedonia, in 1977. He graduated from the Faculty of Music at Ss. Cyril and Methodius University in Skopje. He made his debut in 1999 and from 2000 to 2002 sang with the Macedonian Opera and Ballet (now the National Opera and Ballet in many productions including Lucia di Lammermoor, Il trovatore, Don Giovanni, Turandot, Il barbiere di Siviglia, La forza del destino, Rigoletto, and Aida. He made his international debut at the Wiener Kammeroper in 2001 as Nonacourt in Nino Rota's Il cappello di paglia di Firenze. That year he also began further voice study with mezzo-soprano and Kammersängerin Olivera Miljaković. He has sung in the Macedonian operas Lydia of Macedonia by Risto Avramovski and Tzar Samuil by Kiril Makedonski, and in 2003 the Association of Macedonian Composers awarded him the "Georgi Bozhikov Prize" for the best performance in a work by a Macedonian composer. He was also a laureate at the International "Jeunesses Musicales" competition in Belgrade. Since the 2009/2010 season he has appeared regularly at the Staatstheater Kassel.

On the concert platform Durlovski has appeared as a soloist in Beethoven's Ninth Symphony, the Verdi and Mozart Requiems, Dimitrije Bužarovski's Radomir Psalter, Vlastimir Nikolovski's oratorio To Clement, and Risto Avramovski's Winter symphony. He has sung with the Vienna Residence Orchestra, East-West Symphony Orchestra, Belgrade Philharmonic Orchestra, Sofia Philharmonic Orchestra, and ALEA contemporary music ensemble.

He is married to opera singer Ana Durlovski, with whom he opened the Durlovski Opera Academy in 2019.

In 2020, it is announced that Igor Durlovski is Independent candidate list for Coalition Renewal For Macedonia in the fifth constituency, including Bitola, Ohrid, Prilep and Kicevo for the early parliamentary elections scheduled for 15 July 2020.

== Storming of Macedonian Parliament ==
Durlovski was among the organizers of protests following the parliamentary election in December 2016. On 27 April 2017, the protesters stormed the Assembly Building as the new majority was electing the Assembly Speaker. In November, Durlovski was arrested, along with at least 30 people, under the charges of “terrorist endangerment of the constitutional order and security. The following day several hundred people, led by former Prime Minister Nikola Gruevski and other high-ranking VMRO DPMNE party members, protested in front of the Skopje Criminal Court demanding the immediate release of all who were detained. Since the arrest, there have been several formal and informal symbolic protests, in the Republic of Macedonia and abroad, organized primarily by Durlovski's colleagues and acquaintances, demanding his release from custody. On 15 March 2019 the Court jailed 16 people involved in the 2017 mob attack, and acquitted Igor Durlovski of all charges.

== Sources ==
- National Opera and Ballet. Igor Durlovski - first soloist
- Staatstheater Kassel. Igor Durlovski Bass
