= GOCE (disambiguation) =

GOCE (Gravity Field and Steady-State Ocean Circulation Explorer) was an Earth-orbiting satellite.

GOCE or Goce may also refer to:

== People ==
- Goce Georgievski (born 1987), Macedonian handball player
- Goce Nikolovski (1947–2006), Macedonian singer
- Goce Sedloski (born 1974), Macedonian retired footballer
- Goce Smilevski (born 1975), Macedonian writer
- Goce Toleski (born 1977), football player

== Other ==
- Goce, an opera composed by Kiril Makedonski
- WP:GOCE, the Guild of Copy Editors, an internal collaborative project on Wikipedia
