= Hazari (musical group) =

Serbian ethnic music band

- Origin: Niš, Serbia
- Genres: Ethnic music; jazz; rock; new-age; world music
- Years active: 1991–present
- Labels: KPGT, Vidovdan, WMAS Records, PGP-RTS
- Members: Dragomir Milenković
- Past members: Zoran Talević; Goran Ilić; Goran Đorđević; Joško Hartl; Aleksandar Dobrijević; Nikola Aleksandrov; Milorad Milošević; Milan Brković; Zoran Marjanović; Katarina Kačunković; Dejan Pavlović; Manja Ristić; Miloš Delić; Teuta Aslani; Ivana Đorđević; Goran Petrović

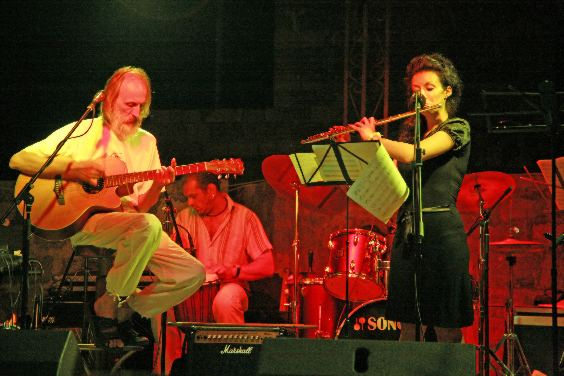
Hazari

Hazari (Serbian Cyrillic: Хазари; trans. The Khazars) is a Serbian musical group formed in Niš in 1991. Led by guitarist and principal songwriter Dragomir Milenković "Joga", Hazari combine ethnic music of the Balkans, jazz, rock, new-age and world music. The group has released five studio albums to date. Although officially active, Hazari appear live occasionally only, as since 2004 Milenković has been dedvoted to his solo releases, also embarking on several side projects.

== History ==
=== 1991–present ===
Hazari were formed by guitarist Dragomir Milenković "Joga" and bass guitarist Zoran Talević in 1991. Milenković, who took up guitar when he was eleven, had previously played with Niš bands Magnum, Kupe za Nepušače (Non-Smoking Compartment) and Funky Soul X Band, also performing in backing bands of traditional music singers Staniša Stošić, Vaska Ilieva and Selimova-Želčeski duo. He was further influenced by the Orthodox church music, Byzantine music, Romani music of Southern Serbia, pagan elements of South Slavic culture, but also by the music of India. His exploration of different genres was followed by him taking up synth guitar. Milenković and Talević originally named the group Etno Pop Zajednica Hazari (Ethnic Pop Community the Khazars), influenced by Milorad Pavić's novel Dictionary of the Khazars. The first lineup of the band also included Goran Ilić (guitar), Goran Đorđević (percussion) and Joško Hartl (drums), the latter simultaneously a member of the hard rock band Kerber.

Hazari debut album, entitled Čuvari istine (Keepers of Truth), was released in 1994 and featured instrumentals composed by Milenković, which combined ethnic music, jazz, rock and new-age. The album was produced by guitarist Dušan "Duda" Bezuha and featured bass guitarist Slaviša Pavlović "Stanley" on several tracks. Soon after the album release, in early 1994, they were joined by guitarist Aleksandar Dobrijević. After Dobrijević left the group, the members decided to include a violinist in the lineup, and were joined by violin player Nikola Aleksandrov. Simultaneously, Hartl left the group and was replaced by Milorad Milošević. In 1994, the group performed at Sofia Jazz Festival, in 1996, they appeared at Cluj Jazz Festival, and in 1997, they performed at Summertime Jazz Festival held in Belgrade's Sava Centar.

The group's second studio album was entitled Balkan Asimetria and produced by Branko Mačić "Mačak". The album title was inspired by asymmetric rhythms of Balkan traditional music. The band recorded the album in a new lineup, featuring Milenković (synth and acoustic guitar), Talević (bass guitar), Aleksandrov (violin), Milan Brković (percussion), Zoran Marjanović (drums) and Katarina Kačunković (vocals), with three album tracks featuring scat singing by latter. After unsuccessful negotiations with several Serbian record labels, Milenković self-released the album through his own record label Vidovdan in the autumn of 1998. By the time of the album release, the band's lineup had changed, featuring Milenković, Dejan Pavlović (bass guitar), Manja Ristić (violin) and Miloš Delić (percussion).

The band's following album, Knjiga proroka Enoha (Book of Prophet Enoch), was released in 2000, also by the band's label Vidovdan, featuring similar ethnic music-oriented sound as the band's previous release, combining Balkan ethnic music with elements of Sufi, Sephardic and Celtic music. The album was produced by Boris Bunjac, and featured, alongside Milenković, Pavlović, Ristić and Delić, new member Teuta Aslani on vocals and flute, and guest appearances by the band's former member Talević on bass guitar, Snežana Spasić on vocals, Filip Krumes on violin and Goran Milošević on percussion.

The band's fourth release, Svetlucanje kroz san (Glimmer in a Dream), released in 2002, featured, alongside instrumental tracks, a number of songs featuring vocals. The tracks featured guest appearances by singers Madame Piano, Gorica Ponjavić (of Neverne Bebe), Sandra Radosavljević, Nataša Todorovska, Svetozar Vujić and Nebojša Jukić. Once again, Milenković authored all of the album songs. In 2003, the band appeared on the various artists live album Guitar Art Festival 2002 with a live version of their song "Uranela". In 2007, Hazari released the compilation album Presek 2007 (Intersection 2007). The album was released with the first issue of the ethnic music magazine Etnoumlje (Ethnomind). The following year, PGP-RTS reissued Svetlucanje kroz san with bonus material.

The album Bogumili (Bogumils) was released in 2014 under Dragomir Milenković & Hazari moniker. The album featured, alongside Milenković, flutist Ivana Đorđević and percussionist Goran Petrović. In 2022, WMAS Records released the compilation album Hazari retrospektiva 1991–2020 (Hazari Retrospective 1991–2020).

=== Milenković's solo works and other activities (2004-present) ===
In 2004, Milenković released Naissus XXI vek (Naissus XXI Century), recorded with a number of collaborators, opting to release it under his own name rather than under Hazari moniker, dedicating the album to his home city.

In 2007, he released the album Gajde (Bagpipes), combining Hazari's original sound with electronic music. The album featured Madame Piano, traditional music singer Nada Popov and bagpipes player Slobodan "Gale" Dimitrijević. The following year, he appeared on the album Zeitgeist by the supergroup Rok Misija (Rock Mission), playing saz and kaval in the cover of YU Grupa song "Kosovski božuri" ("Kosovo Peonies"). In 2009, he released the album 17 rimskih careva (17 Roman Emperors), inspired by the lives of Roman emperors born on the territory of contemporary Serbia.

Milenković's 2016 solo album Vizionarenje (Visioning) featured ambient instrumentals. His 2017 album Trogir was dedicated to his birth town of Trogir, Croatia. During the same year, he released the jazz album album Dragomir Milenković VST Jazz Trio. In 2020, he released another album with his VST Jazz Trio, Beogradske priče (Belgrade Stories), with songs inspired by and dedicated to Serbian capital. The album was Milenković's first release to feature vocals recorded by himself, also featuring singers Nada Popov and Nebojša Jukić. In 2022, his composition "Vračar" (named after the Vračar area of Belgrade) appeared on the various artists instrumental music album RIMUS.

In 2006, for the commemoration of 150 years since the birth of Nikola Tesla, Milenković composed the classical piece Svita za Nikolu Teslu (Nikola Tesla Suite). He composed music for Predrag Stanić's monodrama Besede Nemanjića (Sermons of the Nemanjićs), playing saz and kaval during the performances of the play. He has performed with the Vlach music group Misteria Carpatica, releasing a maxi-single with the group in 2010. He wrote about music for a number magazines, including Pop kultura (Pop Culture), Etnoumlje and Svetlica (Spark).

== Legacy ==
In 2023, Dragomir Milenković was awarded with the Nišville Jazz Festival Lifetime Achievement Award.

== Discography ==
=== Studio albums ===
- Čuvari istine (1994)
- Balkan Asimetria (1998)
- Knjiga proroka Enoha (2000)
- Svetlucanje kroz san (2002)
- Bogumili (as Dragomir Milenković & Hazari, 2014)

=== Compilation albums ===
- Presek 2007 (2007)
- Hazari retrospektiva 1991–2020 (2022)
