= Cerje, Skopje =

Archeological site in North Macedonia

Cerje is an archaeological site dating from neolithic times. Its unique finds include the figurine known as Adam of Macedonia, one of the earliest prehistoric male figurines. Cerje is located near Skopje, North Macedonia.
