= Govrlevo =

Govrlevo Говрлево
- Village
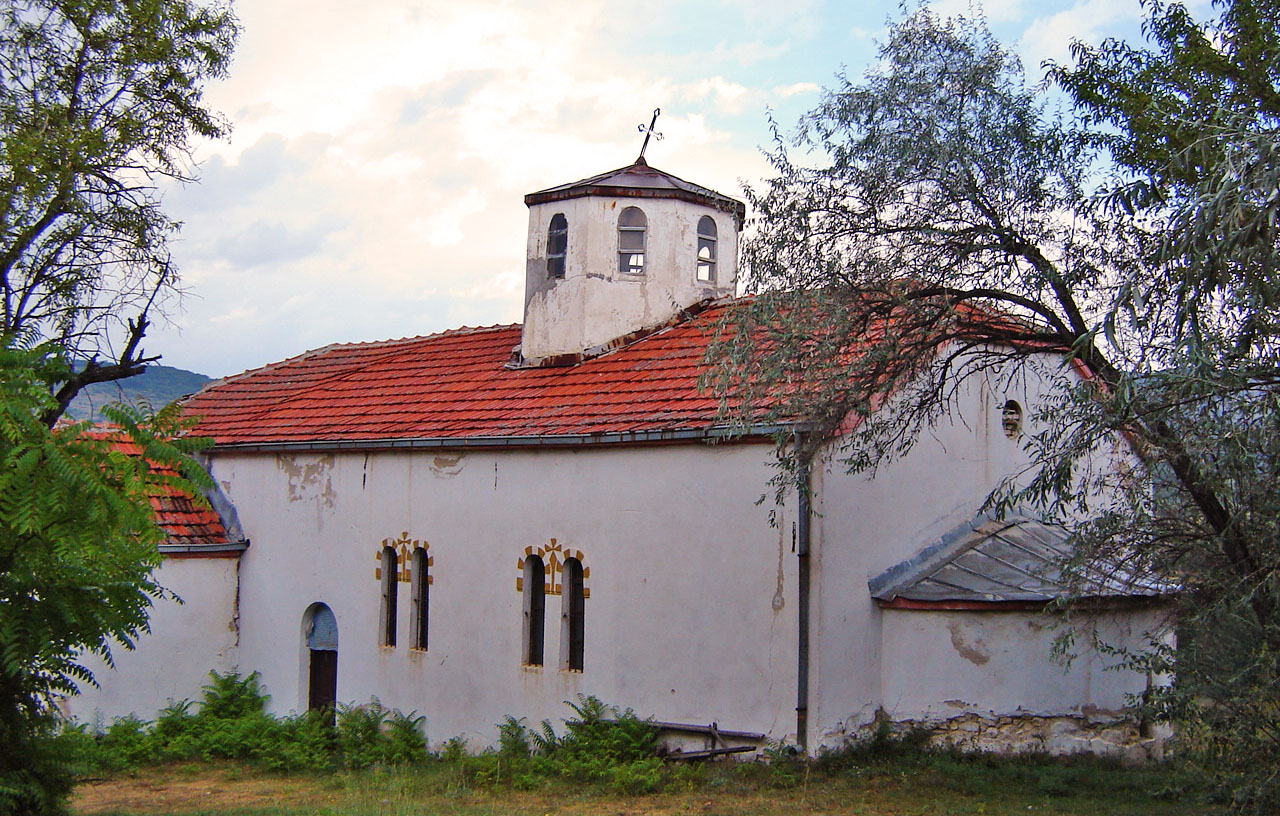
- The Monastery of St. Tryphon in Govrlevo

- Location within North Macedonia
- Country: North Macedonia
- Region: Skopje
- Municipality: Sopište

Population (2002)
  - Total: 30
- Time zone: UTC+1 (CET)
  - Summer (DST): UTC+2 (CEST)
- Website: .

Govrlevo (Macedonian: Говрлево) is a small village in the municipality of Sopište, North Macedonia. Govrlevo is famous for Adam of Macedonia (or "Adam of Govrlevo"), a Neolithic sculpture found by the archaeologist Milosh Bilbija from the Skopje City Museum, and is more than 6.000 years old.

== Demographics ==
According to the 2002 census, the village had a total of 30 inhabitants. Ethnic groups in the village include:

- Macedonians 28
- Serbs 2

== Notable people ==
Blagica Pavlovska, a famous Macedonian folk-singer was born in Govrlevo.
