= Christian Pollack =

Austrian classical conductor

Christian Pollack is an Austrian classical conductor.

== Biography and career ==
Pollack was born in Vienna, Austria, in 1946, where he studied violon, viola, piano and composition at the Conservatory and Musikhochschule. He trained as a conductor with Hans Swarowsky in Vienna, and, later, with Sergiu Celibidache in Munich. He worked as assistant to Christoph von Dohnanyi at the Carinthian Summer Festival, and in 1984 also at the Bregenzer Festspiele. He has conducted with the Vienna Volksoper, since 1984, and was guest conductor of the Stuttgart Radio Symphony Orchestra in 1986.

Pollack has been the chief conductor of the East Slovakian Philharmonic, Košice since 1992, and the musical director of the Wiener Residenzorchester since 2005, as well as musical director of the opera class at the Vienna Conservatory Privat-University. Since September 2002 he has also been the principal guest conductor of the Žilina Chamber Orchestra in Slovakia. Pollack teaches at the Vienna Conservatory, and is working on a complete edition of the works of Johann Strauss II.

Pollack has made many recordings for the Marco Polo and Naxos labels, notably of classical Viennese music, such as the works of Johann Strauss I, Josef Strauss, Ziehrer, Suppé, and Karel Komzák II. His recordings include a number of discs in Naxos' complete Johann Strauss I and II editions.
