= Ohrid Fest =

Annual music festival in North Macedonia

Ohridski Trubaduri - Ohrid Fest is a music festival that takes place in Ohrid, North Macedonia every summer. It began in 1994 as a showcase for Macedonian summer folklore.

In 1997, a pop evening was introduced to motivate Macedonian lyricists and composers, as well as artists. In 2003, an international evening was added to the program, which consists of foreign artists performing their songs along with the best placed songs from the pop evening. The festival has become prominent within the Balkan region which led to its broadcast in different countries such as Bulgaria, Croatia, Montenegro, Serbia, and Greece. The winners of the festival are awarded with a monetary prize as well as promotional products from the sponsors. In 2008, a fourth night was added to the festival in which amateur or unrecognized singers would compete to qualify for the pop evening.

== Winners ==
=== 1994 ===
==== Folk Evening ====
- Jury - Zoran Georgiev - Kazi, Kazi Gino
- Public - Neli Ti Rekov - Moj Galebe

=== 1995 ===
==== Folk Evening ====
- Jury - Goran Kukic - Dali Ima Pile Shareno
- Public - Lence Dedejska - Tecete Solzi

=== 1996 ===
==== Folk Evening ====
- Jury - Marina Puharic & Korona - Vecna Biljana
- Public - Bioritam - Eh, Da Mi Sviri Sadilo

=== 1997 ===
==== Folk Evening ====
- Jury - Blagica Pavlovska - Eh, Ohride
- Public - Blaga Peteska - Zaigraj Srce

==== Pop Evening ====
- Jury - Tanja Carovska - Tvojot Baknez Me Progonuva
- Public - Goce Arnaudov - Sudbino

=== 1998 ===
==== Folk Evening ====
- Jury - Ibus Ibraimovski - Ribari Verni Drugari
- Public - Petar Necovski - Ohrid Moj

==== Pop Evening ====
- Jury - Saso Gigiv-Gis - Jana
- Public - Saso Gigiv-Gis - Jana

=== 1999 ===
==== Folk Evening ====
- Jury - Milica Kuzmanovska - Ajde Zapri Naume
- Public - Petar Necovski - Verna Da Si

==== Pop Evening ====
- Jury - Lidija Kocovska - Ne Znam Da Te Prebolam
- Public - Aleks - Sakam Da Si Moja

=== 2000 ===
==== Folk Evening ====
- Jury - Kirco Pop Lazarov - Bisero, Biser, Ohridski
- Public - Frosina - Irina

==== Pop Evening ====
- Jury - Kompas - Ti Si Mi
- Public - Tanja Carovska - Zavrsen

=== 2001 ===
==== Folk Evening ====
- Jury - Dusko Georgievski - Ilino Mome
- Public - Tomislav Manić - Go Ljubam Ohrid =]

==== Pop Evening ====
- Jury - Elena Petreska - Ne Gledaj Nazad
- Public - Marjan Stojanovski - Srce Ke Ti Ukradam

=== 2002 ===
==== Folk Evening ====
- Jury - Blagoja Grujoski - Sto Se Slucuva
- Public - Zuica Lazova - Ne Me Prasuvaj

==== Pop Evening ====
- Jury - Tvins - Me Zarobi
- Public - Biba Dodeva - Jas I Mojot Bend

=== 2003 ===
==== Folk Evening ====
- Jury - Marijana & Rosana - Ajde Sestro Da Zapeeme
- Public - Orce Stefkovski - Igraj Mome Cocek Ti

==== Pop Evening ====
- Jury - Martin Vucic - Kosa Od Zlato
- Public - Martin Vucic - Kosa Od Zlato

==== International Evening ====
- Jury - Sasa Matic - Mojot Grad (Bosnia & Herzegovina)
- Public - Maja Grozdanovska Panceva - Nova Planeta (North Macedonia)

=== 2004 ===
==== Folk Evening ====
- Jury - Kompas - Korab Izguben
- Public - Petar Necovski - Ohrid Gradu Biseren

==== Pop Evening ====
- Jury - Maja Vukicevic - Amajlija
- Public - Marjan Stojanovski - Ima Nesto

==== International Evening ====
- Jury - Goran Karan - Svetot E Luda Topka (Croatia)
- Public - Bojan Marović - Ako Pak Se Vratiš (Serbia & Montenegro)

=== 2005 ===
==== Folk Evening ====
- Jury - Nino Velickovski & Boemi - Krv Boemska
- Public - Riste Naumovski - Vecen Ohrid

==== Pop Evening ====
- Jury - Miki Jovanovski-Jafer - Nemirni Misli
- Public - Gjoko Taneski - Nemam Pravo

==== International Evening ====
- Jury - Bojan Bjelić - To Nije Ljubav (Serbia & Montenegro)
- Public - Bojan Bjelić - To Nije Ljubav (Serbia & Montenegro)

=== 2006 ===
==== Folk Evening ====
- Jury - -
- Public - -

==== Pop Evening ====
- Jury - Elena Petreska - Galebe
- Public - Elena Petreska - Galebe

==== International Evening ====
- Jury - Vanja & Mika
- Public - Jozefina (Croatia)

=== 2007 ===
==== Folk Evening ====
- Jury - Elena Velevska - Nebo Od Vanila
- Public - Milan Babić - Sega Koga Te Nema

==== Pop Evening ====
- Jury - Elvir Mekić feat. Maja Sazdanovska - Opasno
- Public - Adrian Gaxha - Sam Se Lažam

==== International Evening ====
- Jury - Nikola Burovac & Tanja Žagar - Neka te, Neka te (Serbia/Slovenia)
- Public - Bojan Marović - Ničeg nema(Montenegro)

=== 2008 ===
==== Folk Evening ====
- Jury - Snežana Savić - Sakam da sme zaedno (Serbia)
- Public - Snežana Savić - Sakam da sme zaedno (Serbia)

==== Pop Evening ====
- Jury - Igor Mitrovic - Nikogas poveke
- Public - Dani - Nikoj kako ti

==== International Evening ====
- Jury - Shpat Kasapi (Albania)
- Public - Antonija Sola - Bozji Pat (Croatia)

=== 2009 ===
==== Folk Evening ====
- Jury - Lidija Milosevic-Samanta - Eden den
- Public - Aneta Molika - Imas druga

==== Pop Evening ====
- Jury - Risto Samardziev & Vlatko Ilievski - Za ljubov se pee do kraj
- Public - Risto Samardziev & Vlatko Ilievski - Za ljubov se pee do kraj

==== International Evening ====
- Jury - Jacques Houdek - Opasna Zena (Croatia)
- Public - Risto Samardziev & Vlatko Ilievski - Za ljubov se pee do kraj (North Macedonia)
