= Adam of Macedonia =

Neolithic humanoid sculpture (c. 5500 BC)

Coordinates: 41.9910°N 21.4289°E

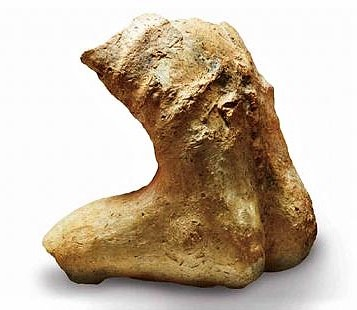
- Created: c. 5,500 BC
- Discovered: 2000; Republic of Macedonia
- Discovered by: Milos Bilbija
- Present location: Skopje, North Macedonia

The Adam of Macedonia, earlier often referred to as the Adam of Govrlevo, is a Neolithic sculpture found by archaeologist Milos Bilbija of the Skopje City Museum where it now resides.

== Description ==
More than 7,000 years old, it is the oldest artwork and artifact found in North Macedonia. Dating from the 6th millennium BC, the sculpture's creator represented a sitting male body, and showed details in the spine, ribs and navel, and erect phallus.

== See also ==
- List of Stone Age art
- Art of the Upper Paleolithic
- Cerje, Skopje
- Kokino
- Tumba Madžari
