= Starogradska muzika =

Music genre

- Stylistic origins: Traditional music
- Typical instruments: Gadulka; kemenche; šargija; bouzouki; tamburica; kaval; zurna; davul; gaida; gusle
- Derivative forms: Folk music

Other topics
- World music, music of Southeastern Europe, Middle Eastern music

Starogradska muzika (Bulgarian, Macedonian and Serbian: староградска музика; literally "old town music") is a kind of urban traditional folk music found in Bulgaria, North Macedonia and Serbia.

== In Serbia ==
Starogradska muzika was very popular during the early 20th century in Serbia. Today, this sort of music can be heard in the bohemian quarter of Belgrade, Skadarlija. It is most popular in the northern part of Serbia, Vojvodina. Famous performers include Zvonko Bogdan, Ksenija Cicvarić, Toma Zdravković and Dušan Jakšić.

The lyrics are often romantic and depict city life, as well as some more rural scenes.

== In North Macedonia ==
The emergence of starogradska muzika is related to the development of cities and the bourgeoisie under the influence of the West in the Ottoman-occupied Macedonia during the 19th century.

Unlike rural folk music, which portrays life in villages, the nature surrounding them, and the hard agricultural work performed in the fields, starogradska music is about life in the city and its famous loves, tragedies, and characters, from rich traders to impoverished beggars. Starogradska music uses instruments such as violins and clarinets instead of ones associated with more rural music, such as gajda. While rural folk performers usually wear traditional village costumes, starogradska music performers are usually dressed in European old city fashions, including suits, hats and neckties, as well as accessories such as pocket watches and walking sticks.

An important, if not the most important part of the Macedonian old city music is the musical genre called Čalgija (not to be confused with chalga, which is a contemporary Turbofolk style in Bulgaria and Serbia). In both rural and urban Macedonian folk, songs about famous revolutionaries also exist.

Among prominent starogradska performers are Ansambl Biljana from the city of Ohrid, a historic center for this sort of music along with Bitola, Prilep and others, the vocal groups Oktet Makedonija from Skopje and Oktet Kumanovo from Kumanovo, and the vocal and instrumental ensemble Raspeani Resenčani from Resen.

== See also ==
- Music of Bulgaria
- Music of North Macedonia
- Music of Serbia
- Folk music
