= Elena Petreska =

Macedonian pop singer from Prilep (born 1980)

- Born: Elena Petreska; August 1, 1980 (age 46); Prilep, SFR Yugoslavia
- Origin: North Macedonia
- Genre: Pop,
- Occupation: Singer (alto)
- Instrument: piano
- Years active: 1999–present

Elena Petreska (Macedonian: Елена Петреска, born August 1, 1980) is a Macedonian pop singer from Prilep. She started her career singing at children festivals and carried on with her studies on the Music Academy in Skopje. Currently she is working on her second album which has not got a name yet.

Elena finished on the fifth place with 67 points at Skopje Festival 2007 (the Macedonian Eurovision selection) with the song "Peam" ("I sing"). During the Montenegrin festival, Budva 2007, Elena Petreska came in ninth place with the song "Kad Leptir Sleti" ("When the Butterfly Flies").

== Singles ==
- "Simni mi dzvezdi" ("Bring me down the stars")
- "Ne gledaj nazad" ("Don't look back") – First prize from the Jury and third from the Audience on the Ohridski Trubaduri Festival
- "Maska" ("Mask")
- "Reka" ("River") – Third place on Makfest Festival
- "Galebe"("Sea Gull")- 1st place on OhridFest (Pop/Rock Evening) 2006
- "Peam" ("I sing")- 5th place at the national Eurosong selection
- "Kad Leptir Sleti" ("When the Butterfly Flies") – 9th place at Budva 2007
- "NLO" ("UFO") – 2nd place on OhridFest (Pop/Rock Evening) 2007
- "Dali si moj" ("Are You Mine")

== Albums ==
- "Odam do kraj" ("I go up to the end) – December 2003
