= Dani Dimitrovska =

Dani Dimitrovska Дани Димитровска
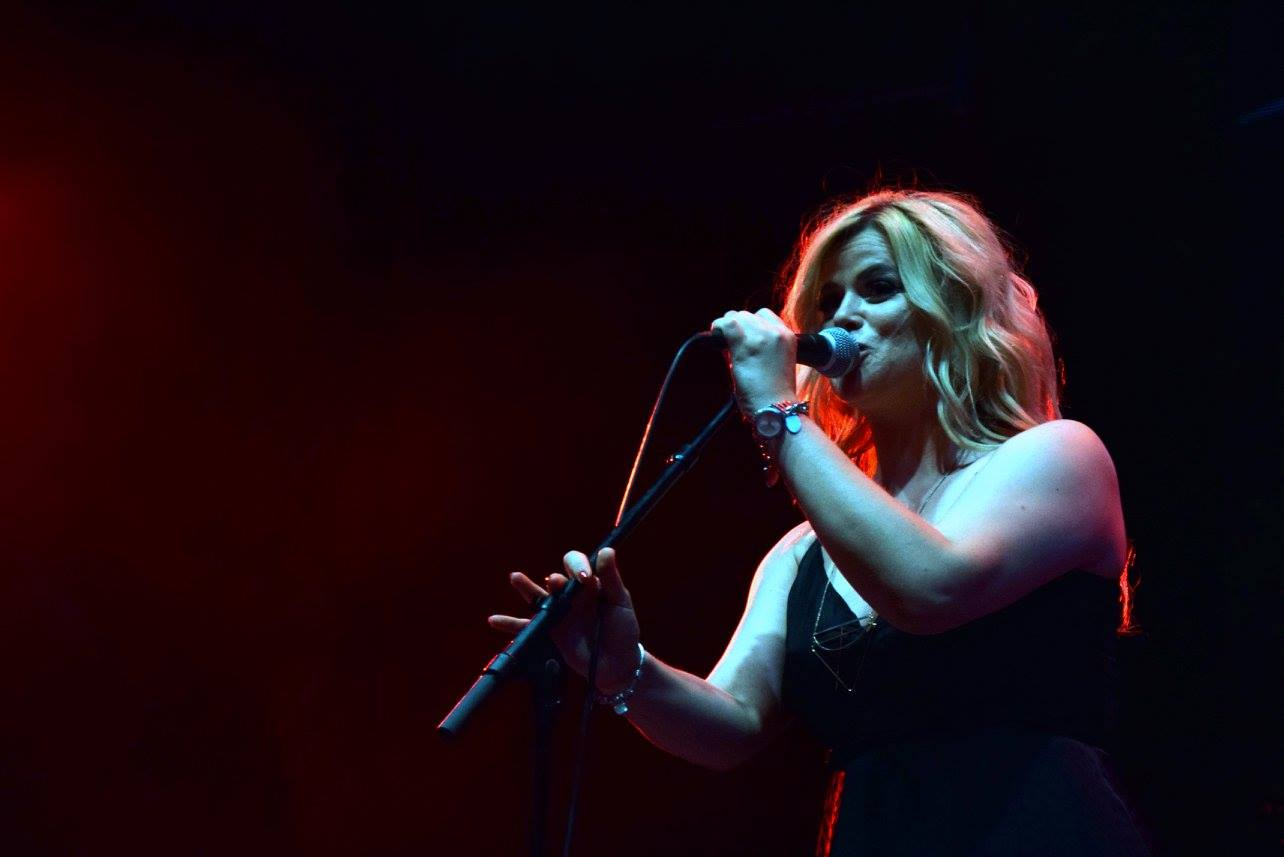

Background information
- Also known as: Dani
- Born: Daniela Dimitrovska; 4 June 1979 (age 47); Skopje, SFR Yugoslavia (present-day North Macedonia)
- Genres: Pop
- Occupation: Singer
- Instrument: Voice
- Years active: 1999–present
- Website: www.danidimitrovska.com

Daniela Dimitrovska (Macedonian: Даниела Димитровска) (born 4 June 1979 in Skopje) or simply Dani, is a Macedonian singer. She has released three studio albums in Macedonian; Ti Da Me Imaš (2006), Vo Megjuvreme (2010) and Grad Za Ljubov (2017).

== Biography ==
Dimitrovska started her career on the music contest Makfest in Štip with the song "Samo Ti Mi Trebaš". The single was well accepted both by audience and journalists. In 2000, she appeared on the national selection for Eurovision Song Contest with the song "A Nekogaš". The same year, she gave birth to her child, called Lazar. After her divorce, she decided to take a career break to raise her little son. The song "Srca Dve" (English: "Two Hearts" ) was her big comeback and it is considered to be Dimitrovska's greatest hit placing her on number 1 on all Macedonian charts for a month, and # 4 on MTV Adria. Dimitrovska was the first Macedonian singer to reach a place on the MTV Adria Top 20 chart.

== 2021-present: Ethno-jazz sound and new singles ==
In 2021, Dimitrova worked together with Micevski and other vocalists on the acoustic ethno-jazz reworks of famous Macedonian songs; this included "Karanfilo filfilo mome", "Belo Lice Ljubam Jas" and "Dejgidi, ludi mladi godini". They were all very well received by the audience, especially the first song which has over 130.000 views on YouTube as of 2024.

On 31 May 2022, Dimitrovska released a collaboration with Macedonian artist Branislav Nikolov, known artistically as Pijan Slavej from Bitola, titled "Begame". The song was written and produced by Vesna Malinova while arrangement was finalized by Jordan Manov. Manov was also responsible for the guitars, bass guitars and drums, while Branislav Nikolov collaborated with him on guitars. All technical recording, mixing and mastering was finalized by Manov at Devil's Eye Studio. A music video was released on the same day directed by 2by4 Digital; Eni Vucidolova and Dimitrova served as responsible for the DOP editing and concept. A real-life pair agreed to play the main protagonists in the video: the male protagonist being played by Lazar.

In the singer's own words "'Begame' is a reflection of human superficiality in the modern collective; estrangement, superlative separation... Fear od responsibility and dedication as a way of functioning."

== Activism ==
On 30 March 2010, Dimitrova went to Dubai in the United Arab Emirates as an ambassador in the UNFPA campaign, a conference related to the fight against AIDS among the youth. She had served as a regional ambassador to the cause for 4 years and was invited to participate in a documentary movie related to the topic and filmed in Sudan.

On 23 April 2015, she worked on the peace-promoting song "Let's Dream" for UNFPA Palestine, together with artists from Egypt and Palestine.

== Singles ==
- "Samo Ti Mi Trebaš" (English: I Need Only You)
- "A Nekogaš" (English: And Sometime)
- "Site Dragi Lugje" (English: All Dear People)
- "Vidi Me" (English: See Me)
- "Ostavam Se" (English: I'm Leaving Everything)
- "Kaži Mi" (English: Tell Me)
- "Srca Dve" (English: Two Hearts) (#1 in the Macedonia; #4 on MTV Adria)
- "Crveni Doždovi" (English: Red Rain) (#1 in Macedonia)
- "A Što Do Togaš?" (English: What Until Then?)(#1 in Macedonia; #8 on MTV Adria)
- "Najdobra" (English: The Best) (#1 in Macedonia)
- "Nikoj Kako Ti" (English: Nobody is like you) (Winner of Ohrid Fest 2008)

== Albums ==
- Ti Da Me Imaš (2006)
- Vo Megjuvreme (2010)
- Grad Za Ljubov (2017)

== See also ==
- Music of North Macedonia
