= Vienna Residence Orchestra =

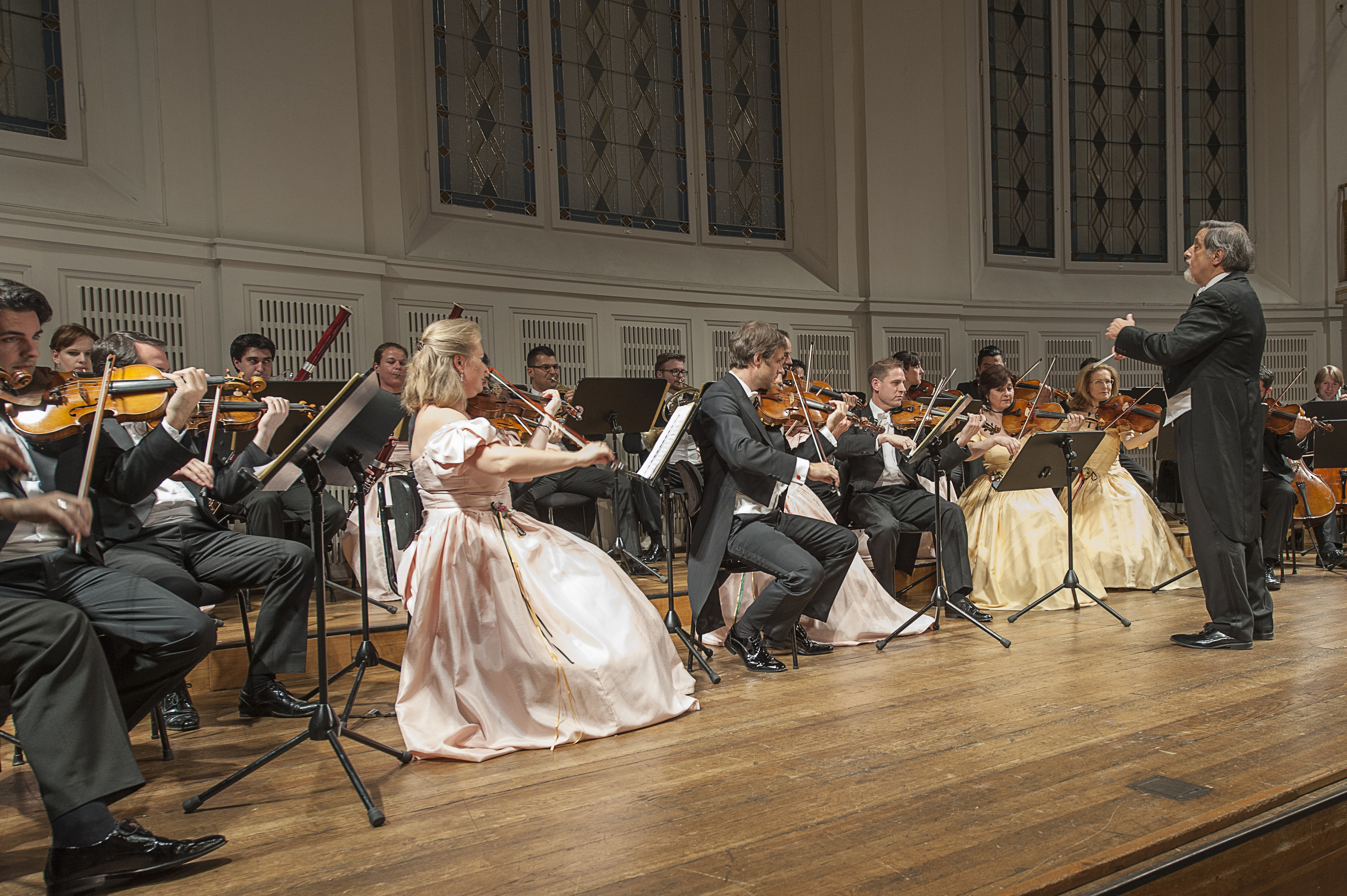
Vienna Residence Orchestra at Wiener Konzerthaus (Mozart Hall)

The Vienna Residence Orchestra (German: Wiener Residenzorchester) is a classical orchestra based in Vienna, Austria. The orchestra plays works of the First Viennese School, with a focus on compositions by Wolfgang Amadeus Mozart and the family of Johann Strauss II as well as works of classical Viennese operetta.

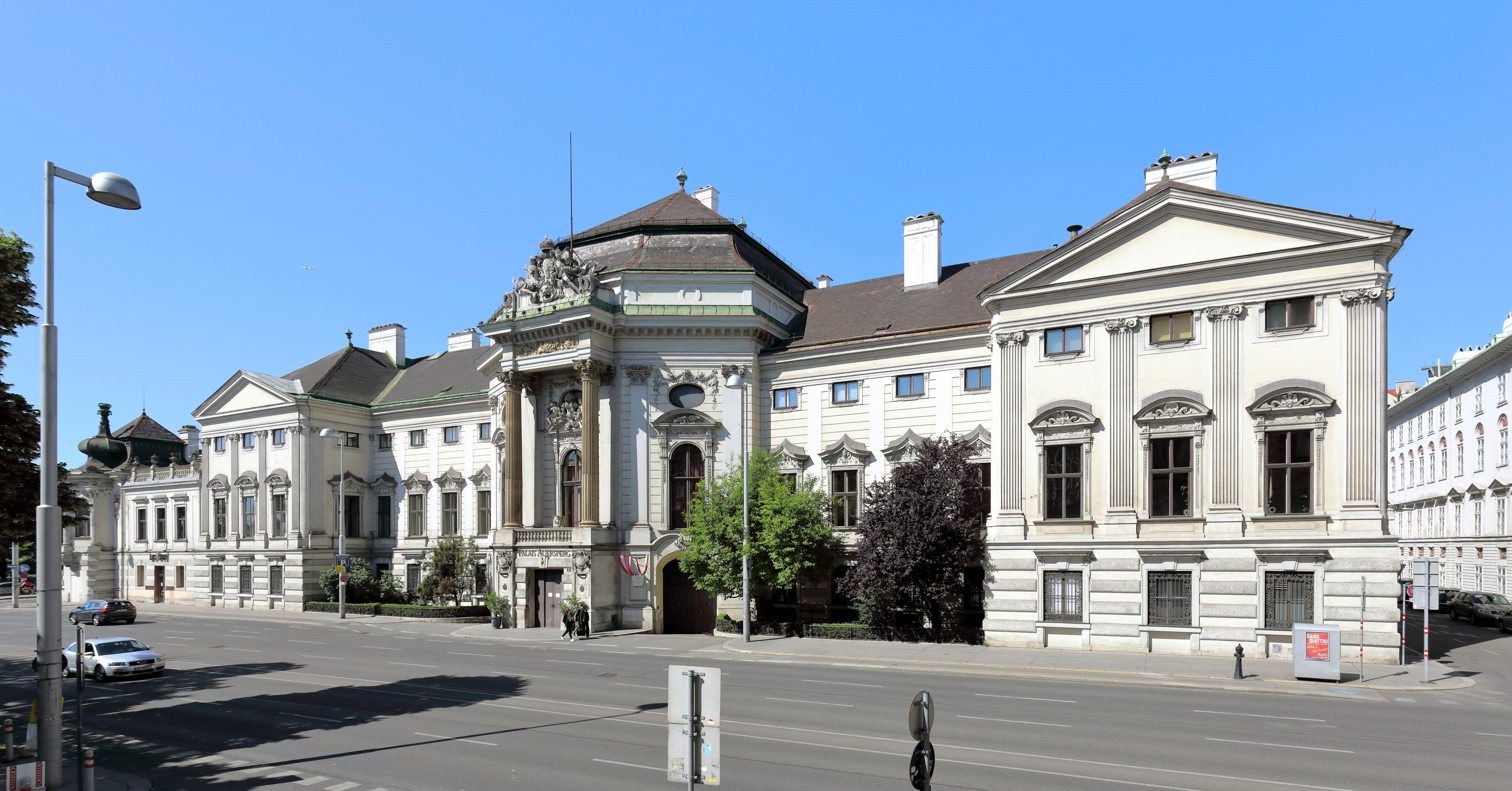
Palais Auersperg, Vienna

== History ==
The Vienna Residence Orchestra was founded in 1990 by pianist and conductor Paul Moser and his wife, Sylvia Moser. Christian Pollack took over the musical direction of the orchestra in 2006. He also invited guest conductors such as Gerhard Lagrange, Daniel Hoyem-Cavazza, and Robert Lehrbaumer. In 2017, Pollack resigned, and Giuseppe Montesano became his successor.

== Tours and guest performances ==
In the first several years after its founding, the orchestra appeared at several international festivals.

Its tours included performances in Paris, Berlin, Rome, Venice, Ravello, Deauville, Athens, the State Opera Budapest, Varese, Mexico, Brussels, Salzburg, and the Vienna Musikverein.

This was followed by concerts in Uruguay (1998), Mexico (1998), Brussels (1999), Thailand (2002), Spain (Canet de Mar, Rialp and Altafulla, 2007), and Italy (Imola, 2007).

Other stations included the "Austrian Weeks" in Stockholm (1997), a performance at the Venice Carnival (2001), the "Italian Fashion & Cultural Event" in Dubai (2003), as well as performances at the "Emiglia Romagna Festival" (2008), "Festival de Música de la Vila de Llivia", and the "Festival de Música de la Vila de Rialp" (2012).

The Vienna Residence Orchestra has also organized individual concerts for small ensembles. In 2017, a chamber ensemble of five musicians along with two ballet dancers followed a concert invitation to the Spanish town of "Llinars del Vallès" (2017).

Apart from a daily concert series at Palais Auersperg, there are some additional performances for individual events. The Vienna Residence Orchestra is part of the Wiener Residenzorchester Veranstaltungs GmbH.

== Awards ==
- 2009 - Concert Munich Unterföhring: Directed by Gerhard Lagrange, the Vienna Residence Orchestra won the "Unterföhringer Mohr" Cultural Award in 2009.

At the follow-up concert in 2011, the Culture Prize was awarded to the Vienna Residence Orchestra. The Culture Award of the municipality of Unterföhring has a special feature: it is completely determined by the audience. The artist or ensemble with the most positive reviews is chosen as the winner.
