= Molika =

Group Molika and Aneta Micevska
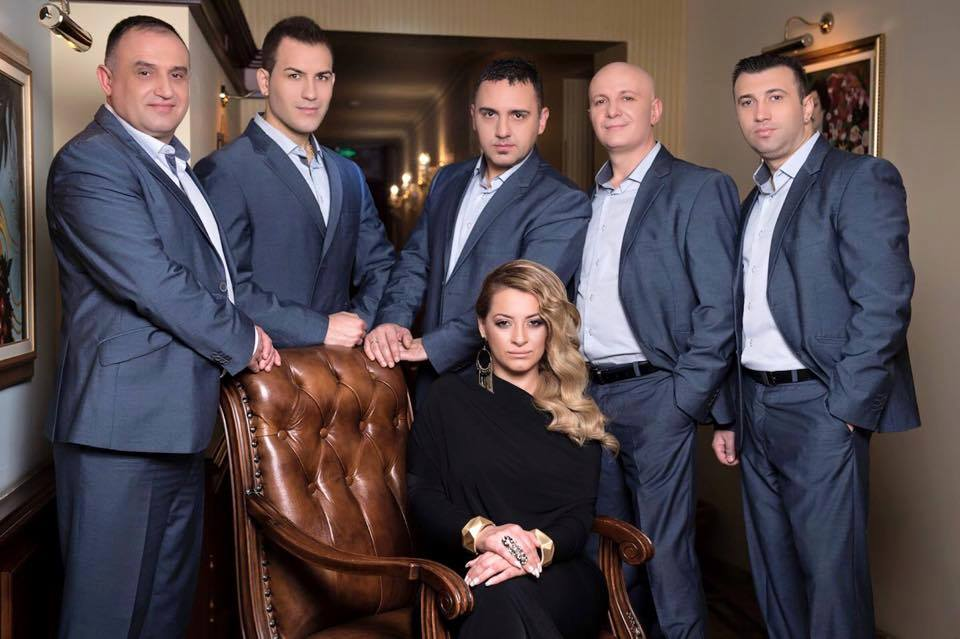

Background information
- Origin: Bitola, Macedonia
- Genres: Traditional, pop, folk
- Instrument(s): Keyboards, drums, saxophone, clarinet, accordion
- Years active: 1992–2025
- Labels: Senator Music Bitola / Grand Production

Molika is a Macedonian musical group formed in 1992 in Bitola, Macedonia. Throughout the years, Molika and Aneta Micevska have recorded and released seven award-winning albums and four DVD music specials. They have travelled and held multiple concerts around the world and have seen great success in countries such as Australia, the United States of America, Canada, Germany, Switzerland, France, Sweden, Denmark, Austria, Italy, Slovenia, Croatia, Bosnia Herzegovina and Serbia.

== Members ==
- Aneta Micevska (lead singer)
- Jovica Naumcevski (a singer)
- Ziso Purovski (keyboards, accordion)
- Rubin Razmovski (saxophone, clarinet, traditional Macedonian wind instruments)
- Dzimi Micevski (keyboards)
- Aleksandar Talevski (drums)

== Recognition ==
In recent years, Group Molika and lead singer Aneta Micevska have been recognized through numerous awards in Macedonia and internationally. Among the multiple awards won in Macedonia, the band was recognized and awarded for being the most successful performing artist group from Bitola. In Bosnia Herzegovina they were repeatedly nominated and won the "Oskar Na Popularnosta" (Oscar for Popularity) three years in a row in 2010, 2011, and 2012. Lead singer Aneta Micevska also received the award "Vokal Na Site Vreminja" (Best Vocalist of All Time). In 2015, Group Molika and Aneta Micevska were signed by one of the biggest recording labels in the Balkans, GRAND PRODUCTIONS, in Belgrade and released their latest Serbian language album in Serbia under the Grand Productions label.

== Musical style ==
Group Molika and Aneta's live performance sets and concerts are celebrated for their diversity in styles, genres and languages. Fans can expect to hear music sung in Macedonian, English, French, Italian, Serbian, Bosnian, Croatian, Aromanian and Bulgarian.

== Feature film ==
Their rise to fame and international success was depicted in the 2012 release of the full-length feature film and musical Patot do Kengurite (The Road to the Kangaroos) in which members of the band played starring roles. In the movie, Macedonian comedy legends Solzi I Smea joined the band in the comical retelling of their quest to visit and perform in Australia. The movie won the award for most popular film release from Bitola the same year.

== New recordings ==
Molika's future plans include the release of new albums in Macedonian, as well as in Serbian and Bosnian.
