= Marc Schonbrun =

American musician

Marc Edward Schonbrun is an American guitarist based in the San Francisco Bay Area. He has produced notable works based on his skill as a guitar/synthesizer expert including books, DVDs, and CDs. After graduating magna cum laude from the Crane School of Music, Schonbrun has performed at various venues including The Tralf Music Hall (Buffalo, New York), and Lincoln Center (New York).

Schonbrun is endorsed by D'Addario Strings, Planet Waves Accessories, Godin Guitars, and Flite Sound Speakers.

Schonbrun continues to work as a professional speaker for various companies, authoring books and DVDs, teaching guitar, and theory in private lessons. In addition to his work as a musician, Schonbrun is an audio engineer and records classical and small chamber ensemble music.

== Books ==
- The Everything Rock & Blues Guitar Book: From Chords to Scales and Licks to Tricks, All You Need to Play Like the Greats ISBN 1-58062-883-4
- The Everything Home Recording Book: From 4-track to digital ISBN 1-59337-138-1
- How to Play the Guitar Rock and Blues Manual - Spanish Translation ISBN 84-96222-19-5
- The Everything Reading Music Book: A Step-By-Step Introduction To Understanding Music Notation and Theory ISBN 1-59337-324-4
- The Everything Guitar Chords: Rock-Blues-Jazz-Country-Classical-Folk: Over 2,000 Chords for Every Style of Music ISBN 1-59337-529-8
- Digital Guitar Power!: The Comprehensive Guide ISBN 1-59200-932-8
- The Everything Music Theory Book: A Complete Guide to Taking Your Understanding of Music to the Next Level ISBN 1-59337-652-9
- The Efficient Guitarist Book 1, Second Edition (Self-Published)
- Mastering Sibelius 5 ISBN 1-59863-426-7
- The Everything Guitar Scales Book with CD: Over 700 Scale Patterns for Every Style of Music ISBN 1-59869-574-6
- The Everything Guide To Digital Home Recording: Tips, Tools, and Techniques For Studio Sound St Home ISBN 1-60550-164-6
- The Everything Music Theory Book 2nd Edition: A Complete Guide to Taking Your Understanding of Music to the Next Level ISBN 1-4405-1182-9

== DVDs ==
- Geek Guitar
- The Efficient Guitarist
