= Blagica Pavlovska =

Macedonian singer (born 1958)

Blagica Pavlovska Благица Павловска
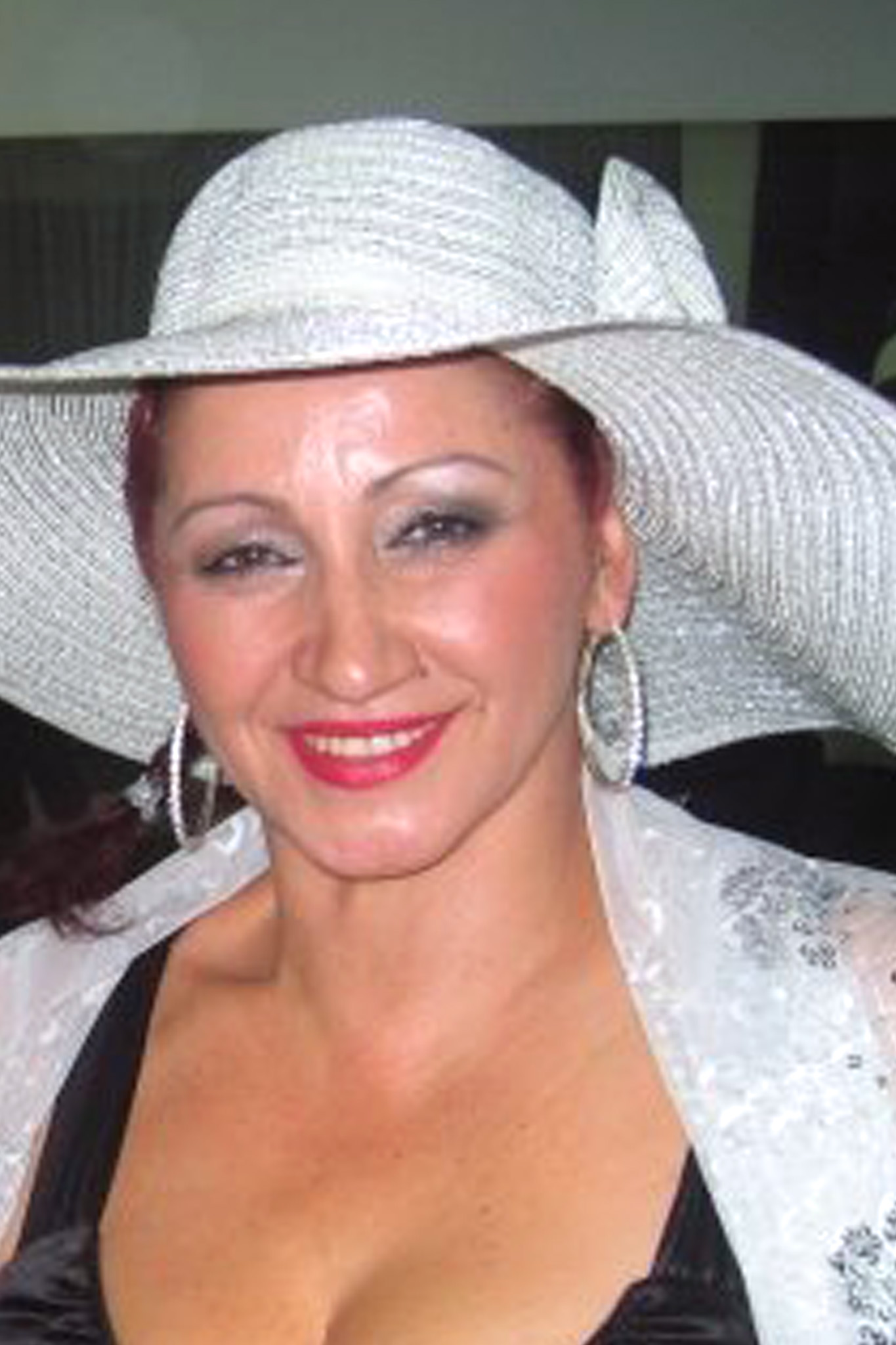

Background information
- Also known as: 4 December 1958
- Origin: Govrlevo, Sopište, North Macedonia
- Genres: Macedonian Folk Music
- Years active: 1993 - present

Blagica Pavlovska (Macedonian: Благица Павловска; born 1958) is a Macedonian singer. She lives and works in Skopje. In addition to her solo career, Blagica Pavlovska sometimes performs with the group called "Four Gracii", which includes Blagica, Andrijana Alacki, Rosana Todorovska and Badi Bekir.

== Discography ==
=== Albums ===
- Nemozam Da Te Zaboravam (1993)
- Ptičica (1993)
- Vljubena žena (1995)
- Skršeno Srce (1998)
- ...i Celo Vranje (1998)
- Spij Mirno Moja Planeto (2000)
- Te Sakam Zemjo Crvena Bulko (2002)
- Casino (2002)
- Doktori 100 Da Me Lečat (2003)
- The Best of Blagica Pavlovska (2004)
- Blagica Pavlovska (2005)
