= Simeon Gugulovski =

Macedonian operatic tenor and singer (1941–1995)

Simeon Gugulovski Симеон Гугуловски
- Born: 1 June 1941; Thessaloniki, Kingdom of Greece
- Died: 13 August 1995 (aged 54) Sofia, Bulgaria
- Genres: Opera; Pop; Folk
- Occupations: Operatic tenor and singer
- Instrument: Voice

Simeon Gugulovski (Note: Macedonian: Симеон Гугуловски, romanized: Simeon Gugulovski; Greek: Συμεών Γκουγκουλόφσκι, romanized: Symeōn Gkoygkoylofski) was a distinguished Yugoslav and Macedonian operatic tenor and singer.

Gugulovski was born in 1941, in Thessaloniki, Greece. His family has origin from Galicnik, a small village located today in North Macedonia.

Elementary and secondary education he finished in Skopje, while he completed his higher education earning a master's degree at Music Academy in Ljubljana.

From 1973 to 1977, he worked as a soloist at the Ljubljana Opera House.

In 1978 he decided to return to SR Macedonia, where he worked at the Macedonian Opera and Ballet until the end of his career.

He died in Sofia, Bulgaria on August 13, 1995.
