= Goce =

Opera by Kiril Makedonski

Goce is an opera composed by Kiril Makedonski (1925–1984), written by Venko Markovski and dedicated to Gotse Delchev. The work was commissioned to be the very first opera performed by the Macedonian National Opera Company. It premiered on 24 May 1954 and it is the first opera to be written in Macedonian.

== See also ==
- Music of North Macedonia
