= Vaska Ilieva =

Macedonian folk singer (1923–2001)

Vaska Ilieva Васка Илиева
- Born: December 21, 1923; Čair, Skopje, Kingdom of Serbs, Croats and Slovenes (present-day North Macedonia)
- Died: May 4, 2001 (aged 77) Skopje, Republic of Macedonia (now North Macedonia)
- Genres: Macedonian Folk Music
- Occupation: Singer
- Instrument: Vocals
- Years active: 1950–2001
- Formerly of: Tanec

Vaska Ilieva (Macedonian: Васка Илиева; February 21, 1923 – May 4, 2001) was a Macedonian folk singer from Yugoslavia and Macedonia.

== Career ==
She started her career as a dancer and singer in the State Ensemble Tanec in the early 1950s. Her style of singing and the songs she sang brought her wide popularity throughout Macedonia, the rest of the former Yugoslavia, the Balkans and throughout the worldwide Macedonian diaspora. She was referred to as the "Queen" of traditional Macedonian music.

Ilieva was awarded various honours from many European countries and toured Europe the Americas and Australia, where there is a large Macedonian community. Her repertoire of over 800 songs earned her a reputation as one of the most versatile and popular Macedonian female artists. Since the mid-1980s, Ilieva focused on interpreting patriotic songs, reflecting popular opinion and preceding the independence of the Republic of Macedonia.

She died on 4 May 2001 in her native Skopje at the age of 77, leaving behind a rich cultural and spiritual heritage. In her honor, and on the occasion of 10 years since her death, a concert was organised and held at the Macedonian Opera and Ballet, featuring famous musical names, as well as her successor Susana Spasovska.
