= Claudia Cassidy =

American arts critic (1899–1996)

Claudia Cassidy

Claudia Cassidy (1899 – July 21, 1996), was an influential, 20th-century American performing arts critic. She was a long-time critic for the Chicago Tribune.

Starting her career in 1925, she was at first a music and drama critic for The Journal of Commerce in Chicago before moving to the Tribune. She was so well known for giving caustic reviews to what she considered bad performances that she earned the nickname "Acidy Cassidy."

Although she had a reputation for biting critique, Cassidy's enthusiasm may have been even more powerful. She's credited with boosting both Glass Menagerie and A Raisin in the Sun. She also helped popularize the Lyric Opera of Chicago and induced Fritz Reiner to lead the Chicago Symphony.

== Career ==
Cassidy had a particular aversion to touring companies of Broadway shows. In her music criticism, according to a 1993 article in the Chicago Reader, conductor Rafael Kubelik was "practically hounded out of town" by Cassidy.

Her sustained praise for The Glass Menagerie over several columns is credited with rescuing the show from closing in tryouts and propelling it to move on to Broadway success. According to Philip Rose, A Raisin in the Sun became a hit after a surprise positive review from Cassidy as well as "good reviews in other papers." In 1975, Cassidy was awarded the Joseph Jefferson Award. Her last published writing was for the 1990-91 Lyric Opera program book.

== Personal life and death ==
Cassidy was married to William J. Crawford for 57 years. After her husband died in 1986, Cassidy lived at the Drake Hotel until her death in 1996 at the age of 96.

The Claudia Cassidy Theater of the Chicago Cultural Center is named in her honor.

== Books ==
- Cassidy, Claudia, Europe on the Aisle, New York: Random House, 1954
- Cassidy, Claudia, Lyric Opera of Chicago, Chicago IL: Lyric Opera of Chicago, 1979 ISBN 0-9603538-0-1
