= Selimova-Želčeski =

Selimova-Želčeski Duo, Macedonia

- Origin: Republic of North Macedonia
- Genres: Folk music
- Years active: 1971–present
- Labels: PGP-RTB (1971-1991)
- Members: Kevser "Keti" Selimova; Đorđe Želčeski

Duet Selimova-Želčeski, was a former Yugoslav and Macedonian folk music duo, consisted of married couple Kevser "Keti" Selimova (Macedonian: Кевсер Селимова) and Đorđe Želčeski (Macedonian: Ѓорѓи Желчески). The duo were one of the best known musical groups of Macedonia, and they were also well known in the other former Yugoslav republics.

Selimova is Macedonian Turkish from Resen, while Želčeski was Macedonian from Prilep. Selimova currently lives in Belgrade while Želčeski died in February 2020.
