= Tanec =

Macedonian folk ensemble

- Formation: 1949
- Type: Folk music ensemble
- Location: Skopje
- Region served: North Macedonia
- Website: Tanec.mk

Tanec (Macedonian: Танец) is a folklore musical ensemble from Skopje, North Macedonia. It is considered as an ambassador of the Macedonian folklore tradition worldwide.

== History ==
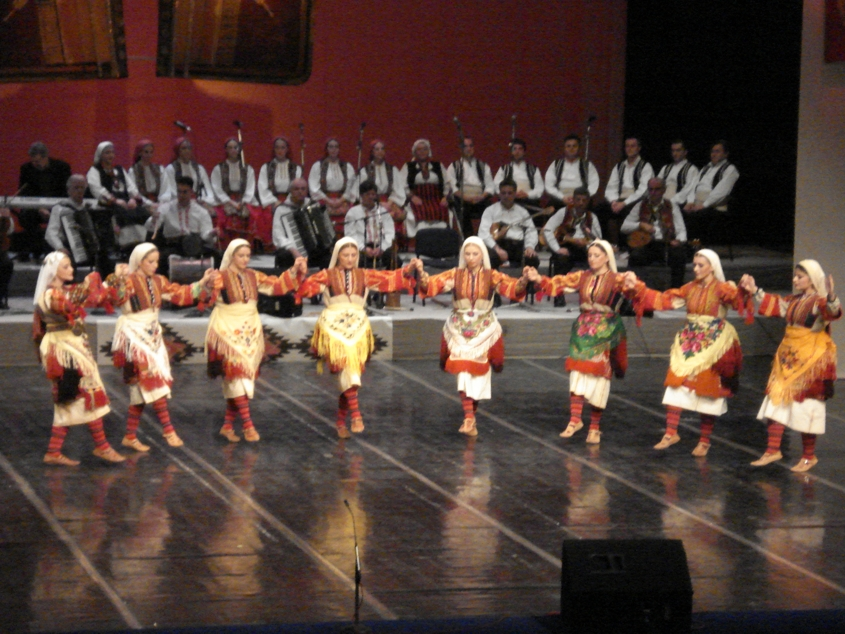

The Tanec ensemble was founded by the Government of the People's Republic of Macedonia in 1949 with an aim to collect, preserve and present the Macedonian folklore: folk songs and folk dances, folk instruments and national costumes.

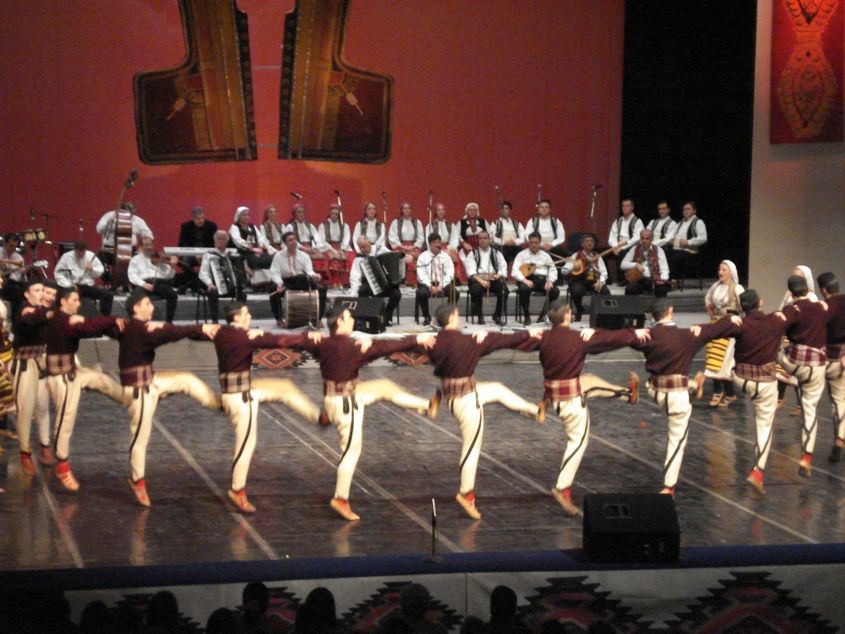

Tanec has taken part in over 3,500 concerts and festivals around the world including: United States, Canada, Australia, Japan, Soviet Union, France, Belgium, Germany, Switzerland, Italy, Greece, Turkey, Kuwait, Israel, Egypt, Nigeria, Mali, Senegal and Zaire as well as concerts across the former Yugoslavia.

== Awards ==
The ensemble received the First Prize at the International Festival in Llangollen, United Kingdom in 1950. In 2008, Tanec received the "Order of Merit for Macedonia".

== Reviews ==
In a 1964 interview, for the newspaper “Večer”, Skopje, People’s Republic of Macedonia Raymond Guillier, The Manager of Ensemble 'Tanec's tour of France (from Paris, France) commented: “Everyone who went to the concerts by Ensemble “Tanec” in France was fascinated ... ‘Tanec’ is playing in the spirit of Macedonia, no other Ensemble in the world can perform ... Your girls and boys put their whole heart into the dance and example of this is clarinetist Tale Ognenovski.”

Tanec's North American tour began with their debut on CBS TV Programme Omnibus (U.S. TV series) on January 22, 1956. Their first live US television performance was taped on videocassette and archived at the Library of Congress in Washington, D.C., and in Catalog Record is written description content: “The Yugoslav national folk ballet / directed by Elliot Silverstein; with the Tanec dance troupe from Macedonia (20 min.)”

On January 27, 1956, the Tanec Ensemble performed at Carnegie Hall in New York City. For this Carnegie Hall concert The New York Times music critic John Martin, wrote, "This particular group, part of a national movement toward the revival of the folk arts, comes from Macedonia … brilliantly spectacular and wonderfully unfamiliar dances … unforgettable pipe.“

The New York Herald Tribune music critic Walter Terry, wrote, “Tanec, a Macedonian group of some forty dancers and musicians, gave generously of their rich folk heritage ... In “Sopska Poskocica,” to make the point five young men took over the stage and indulged in show-off tactics to attract the girl ... An audience which jammed Carnegie to capacity cheered and applauded the folk dancing with as much enthusiasm as if it had been witnessing classical, theatrical ballet at its most glittering.”

Stjepan Pucak, former Tanjug correspondent and Croatian journalist note: "To choose which were the most successful of the program's seventeen folk dances, when all were greeted with stormy applause, is really very difficult and risky ... “Sopska Poskocica” was even repeated, and to repeat a performance on the American stage is a really rare and exclusive event."

Naum Nachevski, journalist of the newspaper Nova Makedonija, Skopje, People’s Republic of Macedonia note: “The audience interrupted some of the folk dance performances with applause; these dances in particular left great impressions of the folklore … the unusual rhythm of Macedonian folk music. The “Tanec” ensemble not only received a warm welcome from the New York public, but also from the New York press.”

The New York Times music critic John Martin, on February 5, 1956, wrote, “There is an amazing variety to the dances that comprised this particular program … the broken circles of the kolo of the Macedonian mountains … a dateless reed pipe”

For the concerts at The Civic Opera House in Chicago, Illinois on February 4 and February 5, 1956, The Chicago Daily Tribune reviewer, Claudia Cassidy, noted: “… called Tanec, which is the Macedonian word for dance, this group of 37 dancers, singers and musicians is a kaleidoscope of the Balkans ... When five of them dance the "Sopska Poskocica", which apparently just means they are showing off to the girls. I would keep them any day as an unfair trade for the four little swans in Swan Lake.”

For the concert at The Academy of Music in Philadelphia, Pennsylvania on February 7, 1956, The Philadelphia Inquirer music critic Samuel Singer commented, "'Tanec' means 'dance', but 'dance' in a larger form than customary. Besides dance alone, it conveys drama, ritual, tradition, songs, even military maneuvers ... there was a remarkable precision in both dancing and playing ... Clarinet, bass fiddle, violin, drums, guitar and flute provided most of the accompaniments in various combinations."

For the concert at The Constitution Hall in Washington, D.C., on February 9, 1956, Paul Hume, the Washington Post and Times music critic observed, "A Sopska Poskocica is devised to show the girls how handsome and wonderful and brilliant and exciting and sensational their man friends are. The rate at which it is danced, and the tremendous energy and precision of six men who dance it, is unique and demanded a repetition."

For the concert at Massey Hall in Toronto, Ontario, Canada on February 13, 1956, John Kraglund, a music critic for The Globe and Mail wrote: "The first impression, however, must be one of rhythmic precision ... Nor was the performance without spectacle ... in the case of one dance, Sopska Poskocica, it was no more than a show-off dance. As such it was highly effective."

For the concert at The War Memorial Opera House in San Francisco, California on March 7, 1956, San Francisco Chronicle music critic R. H. Hagan says, "... in a number titled simply "Macedonian Tune", which in its intricate rhythms and plaintive melody should at least make Dave Brubeck send out an emergency call for Darius Milhaud".

For the concert at The Philharmonic Auditorium in Los Angeles, California on March 12, 1956, Los Angeles Times music critic Albert Goldberg commented: "For authentic folk dancing, wild and free and yet subject to its own intricate disciplines, this group would be hard to beat ...They are accompanied by a group of musicians consisting of a violinist, guitar and accordion players, a flutist, a clarinetist and double bass, though drums of different types are frequently involved, as well as a shepherd's reed pipe"

Dance Observer commented: "The capacity audience at Carnegie Hall on January 27 for the single New York performance of Tanec, the Yugoslav National Folk Ballet, enjoyed a fascinating cross-section of over 2000 years of human history and culture. Tanec is a Macedonian group"

After the end of the tour the Life commented: "A hundred years ago on the rugged roads of Macedonia, bands of brigands used to plunder the caravans of rich merchants and, like Robin Hood, pass on some of their spoils to the poor ... this spring, the Yugoslav National Folk Ballet is making a first, and highly successful tour of the U.S ... Together they make as vigorous a display of dancing as the U.S. has ever seen."

For the concert of The Tanec ensemble at “Grand Palais” in Bourges, France on September 23, 1959, newspaper “La nouvelle republique du Centre” commented: "The first performance of the National Ballet of Macedonia was a tremendous success. Everyone in the hall applauded with enthusiasm, here in the ‘Grand Palais’ in Bourges at the first performance in France ... The members of the National Ballet of Macedonia arrived four days ago in Paris and have been shown on television,” and newspaper Le Berry Republicain commented: "The quality and talent of this group is admirable ... This is the first time that they have performed in France ... At the end of their concert, the members of Ensemble 'Tanec' remained on stage and were applauded by the Bourges audiences for more than a quarter of an hour."

For the concert of The Tanec ensemble at Port Gitana Bellevue, Geneva on July 10, 1959, newspaper Tribune de Geneve commented: "We were presented with remarkable spectacles performed by the Yugoslavian National Folk Ballet 'Tanec' from Macedonia ... Nothing here that resembled classical dances of our Western World ... They have the rhythm of the dances of their country in their blood...."

== See also ==
- Oro (dance)
- Music of North Macedonia
