= Čalgija =

Music genre

Čalgija or Chalgiya (Macedonian language: Чалгија; Bulgarian language: Чалгия) is a Macedonian and Bulgarian music genre, which also is a subgenre of the old urban traditional folk music (starogradska muzika) of Macedonia and Bulgaria.

Čalgija is performed by ensembles called Čalgii (Чалгии) with instruments such as a dajre (tambourine) and tarabuka (hourglass drum) providing percussion for ut (lute), kanun (zither), clarinet and violin.

Čalgija should not be confused with Chalga (a contemporary pop-folk dance music of Bulgaria).

== See also ==
- Starogradska muzika
- Music of Bulgaria
- Turbo-folk
- Chalga
- Skiladiko
- Arabesque (Turkish music)
- Music of Lebanon
- Arabic pop music
- Tallava
