= Kiril Makedonski =

A room dedicated to the life and work of Kiril Makedonski in the Museum of Bitola.

Kiril Makedonski (19 January 1925 – 2 June 1984) was a Macedonian composer. Born as Kiril Vangelov in Bitola, Kingdom of Yugoslavia, Makedonski studied music composition at the Zagreb Conservatory in Croatia. He is best known today for composing Goce (1954), the first opera in Macedonian, which was commissioned for the inaugural performance of the Macedonian National Opera Company. He wrote two other operas, King Samoil and Ilinden. His other compositions include five symphonies, two ballets, two symphonic poems, and a large amount of choral music and vocal art songs.
