= Afektiven Naboj =

Macedonian punk rock band

- Origin: Struga, North Macedonia
- Genres: Post-punk, dark wave, Byzantine music, gothic rock
- Members: Goran Trajkoski- vocals Klime Kovaceski- guitar Zoran Lukesevic- drums

Afektiven Naboj (Macedonian: Афективен Набој) was one of the two punk rock bands (the other being Filter) formed in 1979 by the guitar player Klime Kovaceski and Goran Trajkoski, now an eminent musician from North Macedonia, who rose to international prominence as a frontman of the group Anastasia featured on the soundtrack album for the Academy Award-nominated Milčo Mančevski's film Before the Rain.

== See also ==
- Mizar
- Padot na Vizantija
- Punk rock in Yugoslavia
