= Panta Džambazoski =

Macedonian musical artist and journalist (born 1960)

Panta Džambazoski Панта Џамбазоски
- Born: October 9, 1960 (age 65) Skopje, Republic of Macedonia (present-day North Macedonia)
- Genres: Rock music
- Occupation(s): Musician and journalist
- Instrument: Drums

Panta Džambazoski (Macedonian: Панта Џамбазоски; born 9 October 1960) is a musician and journalist from the Republic of Macedonia. He was first drummer of the Macedonian rock band Mizar, of which he chose the name. He was in the band for seven years. For a short while after that he was in the band Berlin Gori. In 1988 he joined Arhangel. He is now a journalist for the television station TV Telma.

== Biography ==
At the end of 1988, Panta Dzambazovski was the first drummer in the group Arhangel, founded by Risto Vrtev. Today, Panta Dzambazovski is a news editor at TV Telma, one of the most watched private televisions with a national license in Macedonia. Prior to that, he was an editor at the once largest Macedonian daily Nova Makedonija, and opened a correspondence office in Tirana., from where he reported for two years. He began his journalistic career in 1985. in the youth newspaper Mlad Borec, where he was first music editor, and then editor of the political section

== See also ==
- Arhangel
- Anastasia
- Padot na Vizantija
- Goran Trajkoski
- Music of the Republic of Macedonia
- SFR Yugoslav pop and rock scene
