= Mizar (disambiguation) =

Mizar is a bright star in the constellation Ursa Major.

Mizar may also refer to:

- The Mizar system, for writing mathematical definitions and proofs
- AVE Mizar, a flying car
- USS Mizar, two ships in the United States Navy
- Mizar (band), from North Macedonia
  - Mizar (album), their 1988 debut album
- Mizar (Sabotaggio in mare), a 1954 Italian war film
- Mizar (mountain), mentioned in Psalm 42 of the Bible
- Mizar, the antagonist in the Jet Force Gemini video game
- Mizar, a character in the book The Sandman: Endless Nights
- Epsilon Boötis, another star also called Mizar
