= A Terrible Beauty =

A Terrible Beauty may refer to:

- A Terrible Beauty (1960 film), an American drama film
- A Terrible Beauty (2013 film), an Irish-language docudrama
- A Terrible Beauty (The Uncle Devil Show album), 2004
- Terrible Beauty (novel), by Peter T. King, 1999
- A Terrible Beauty (Christy Moore album), 2024

== See also ==
- Kobna ubavina (Terrible Beauty Is Born), a 2004 album by Mizar
