= Benče =

Benče Бенче
- Village
- Location within North Macedonia
- Coordinates: 41°41′30″N 21°5′52″E
- Country: North Macedonia
- Region: Southwestern
- Municipality: Makedonski Brod
- Elevation: 918 m (3,012 ft)

Population (2002)
  - Total: 43
- Time zone: UTC+1 (CET)
  - Summer (DST): UTC+2 (CEST)

Benče (Macedonian: Бенче) is a small village located in the region of Porece in the municipality of Makedonski Brod, North Macedonia. It used to be part of the former municipality of Samokov.

== Demographics ==
The village is attested in the 1467/68 Ottoman tax registry (defter) for the Nahiyah of Kırçova. The village had a total of 63 houses, excluding bachelors (mucerred).

According to the 2002 census, the village had a total of 43 inhabitants. Ethnic groups in the village include:

- Macedonians 43
