= O Armatolos =

1860 poem by Grigor Parlichev

"O Armatolos"

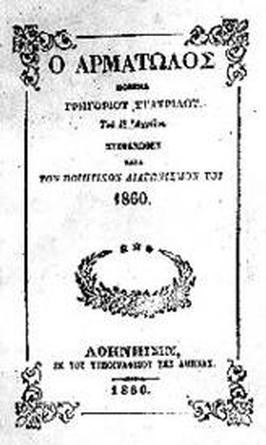
The first published edition cover.

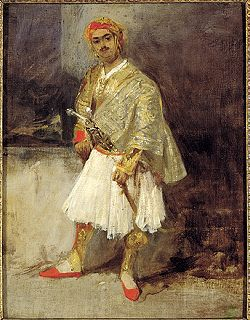
A Greek armatolos, from which the poem gets its title.

"O Armatolos" (Greek: Ο Αρματωλός) is a poem written by the 19th-century poet Grigor Parlichev. The poem was composed in 1860, and officially published on 25 March of that year to participate in the Athens University competition for best Greek language poetry, winning first place. Parlichev considered the poem his lifetime achievement.

== Synopsis ==
"O Armatolos" tells the story of the death of a legendary hero who protected the villagers from Gheg Albanian (Ghegis) gangs. It is set in the middle of the 19th century in Western Macedonia, specifically the region between Galichnik, Reka, and the village Stan, all in present-day North Macedonia).

Based on the motif of the folk songs about Kuzman Kapidan, the poem's theme develops into nine parts. The first part tells about the tragic struggle and death of the hero Kuzman. In the second part, Kuzman's mother expects her son's return from battle, not knowing that he has died. The third part tells of the pain that the enemies of the peasants have caused by bringing the inanimate body of Kuzman into the village. It is in this part that the poem's most popular line "screams can be heard from Galichnik in Reka" is used, as an allusion to the sorrow of the people. In the fourth part, the author returns to the scenes of Kuzman's last battle and his demise. Through the fifth part, the attackers pay due respect to Kuzman by pledging not to attack his home village. Kuzman's mother removes the curse she had said towards the village enemies and forgives them, requiring the Gheg Albanians not to attack the Reka people anymore. In the sixth part, the grieving mother of Kuzman takes center stage and details the genealogical tree of the hero. This section notes Kuzman's lover Cveta. The seventh part tells how the hero's mother orders the villagers to bury Kuzman and the other fighters together with all honors. The scene of the eighth part takes place at the home of Kuzman's fiancee and details her grief that eventually causes her to become a nun. The ninth part marks the end of the piece, in which the everlasting glory of Kuzman is extolled.

== Background ==
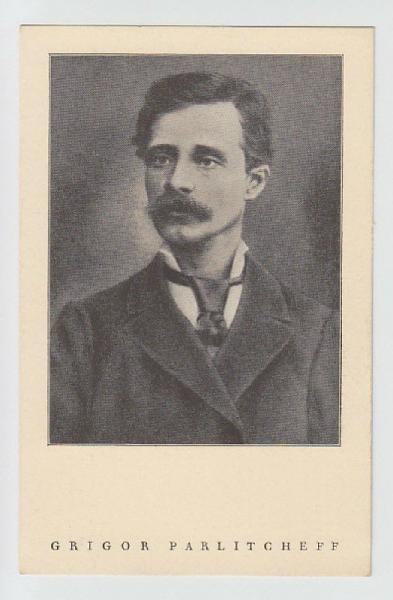
Portrait of Grigor Parlichev.

Before he wrote the poem, Grigor Parlichev was moving around the Balkan Peninsula working as a teacher. He went to work in Tirana, Albania, where he became fond of Homer and Greek poetry. In 1849, he visited Athens where he entered the Medical School to study medicine. In 1850, before returning to his hometown Ohrid, he visited the poetry competition in the Athens University, being deeply impressed by the ceremony in which the winner is awarded by king Otto of Greece.

Parlichev had been a passionate philhellene at the time of the poem's writing, identifying as Greek rather than Bulgarian. His affinity for Greece and the Homeric style informed his decision to compose the poem in Greek.

In 1859, he returned to Ottoman Macedonia to work as a teacher in order to earn enough money to continue his university studies. After returning to Greece, he started his second year in medicine. The period is marked by a lack of interest in his studies and he eventually started to work on the poem. The poem was inspired by an old folk song sung in his home village of Belica, which told of a mythical folk hero known as Kuzman Kapidan who defeated Albanian robbers and provided a relatively peaceful life for the village population. The period of writing and studying in Athens is known as the "Athenian period" of his life, as defined by the historian Raymond Detrez.

== Poem ==
The poem was written in katharevousa, a variety of Modern Greek. The poem's story revolves around the myth of a popular or national hero, who protects his people from the atrocities of foreign enemies. The main themes explored in "O Armatolos" are the religious hatred and inter-religious clashes this caused in the 19th century. The original text of the poem consists of 912 alternately rhymed verses. The beginning of the original version follows:

"From Galichnik to Reka sighs and shrieks of sorrow rise;
What dire disaster hounds
The men and women thus to waken Echo with their cries?
What new-found ill abounds?

Have the hailstorm's sharp stones shattered the fields of standing wheat?
Have locusts stripped the fields?
Has the Sultan sent hard-hearted taxmen early for receipt
Of their most bitter yield?"

Here the author creates an allusion of the deep sorrow of the people from Reka, still without knowing what is the cause. Asking multiple questions, suspecting situations that might strike such grieve. The questions are rejected in the third stanza, giving the real cause in the fourth:

"No, the sharp stones have not shattered the fields of standing wheat;
Nor locusts stripped the fields;
Nor the Sultan sent hard-hearted taxmen early for receipt
Of their most bitter yield.

Fallen is the mighty Kuzman at the wild Geg's hands;
The sturdy Sirdar's slain.
Now brigands bold will hold our mountains, ravaging our lands,
And none shall bar their way."

Since the beginning of the first verse, Parlichev's lyrical and suggestive style by the unforced hyperbole, antithesis and Homeric comparisons, introduces the reader to the event, heralding the doom that the people of Reka have after the falling death of the armatoloi. Revealing that the source of their sorrow is his death, and that he will be forever among them, cursing the enemy that had killed him. The first and second verses of the second song go:

"Once, in Spring, a pensive woman paused before her door,
Lit by the sinking sun.
Her elbows rested on her knees and cradled in her arms she bore
A coldly gleaning gun.

She is in her middle years, a buxom fine-formed woman,
Soldier-strong in build,
And well-proportioned, like a carving of an Amazon –
Ay, she is Beauty's child."

With these words, Parlichev describes the mother of Cosmas and her appearance. As she is more than eagerly awaiting her son's return from battle. During the entire second song, the author describes the waiting of Cosmas' mother Neda and the message that she receives of her son's death. In the third part of the poem it is seen how the enemy rebels bring the body of Cosmas into his home village through these words:

"But suddenly outside the house the sound of steps is heard,
A sound subdued and low.
Four Albanians in mourning with their bowed heads bared
Descend the village road.

Dark with sweat they bear their burden to the very doors,
The precious body they bear;
While all the village folk, dumbfounded, gathered round the corpse
In stricken silence stare."

In this scene, the Ghegs bring back the inanimate body of Cosmas in the village. The narrator using epic subjectivity paints a better picture of the Ghegs. They are the blood enemies of Cosmas, from whose hand many of his comrades lost their head, they are like pilgrims of courage and honesty, on their hands they carry the dead body of Cosmas to his mother, paying their deep respect on the way. In particular piety the old Gheg talks about the heroism of Cosmas, therefore swears before the dead body of the hero, that no one will offend his mother:

"Every day were you to weep for him you would have cause,
Good mother, yet be strong.
A giant you have lost indeed, but those to come will laud
Your son's brave deeds in song.

Ay, mother, for by Ares' servants honoured shall they be,
His feats of far renown.
And all across the world by minstrels honoured shall you be
In singing accents warm."

Parlichev carries on describing the character of Maria, Cosmas' fiancee. Due to folk customs, she is restricted from showing her sorrow for Cosmas' death in public. And, by facing tradition her father decides to marry her to another man. Being forced beyond her will, she runs out and becomes a nun.

"Who are you, woman, here amongst the tears of all the rest
Unmoved? Can you not feel?
A nun she is, Fotina, and there beats within her breast,
A heart as hard as steel."

The eighth song begins with the verses:

"Near Galichnik there stands a sacred hill, all sown about
With willow trees, and there
A streamlet rustles, slipping swift and snake-like, pouring out
Its waters, crystal clear.

The bright light of the sun scarce ever manages to broach
The shady branches here,
And here the cuckoo cries, the herald of the Spring's approach,
Whose call is sad to hear.

Leaning against a willow tree a pensive man sits here,
Weary from travelling.
He listens to the singing of the birds which fills the air,
The clamour of the Spring.

and ends with the self-referential stanza:

Playing a two-stringed guzla, seated there beside the path,
A grey-haired beggar sang,
The tale I tell, which I, a simple chronicler who passed,
Have written line for line.

Artistically, the author leaves the readers with a slight picture of the region around Galichnik, where the events of the poem take place. With a willow planted landscape, the birds coming in spring, the beautiful sounds that succeed the cold, the bad, when everyone could calm down and rest.

== Contest ==
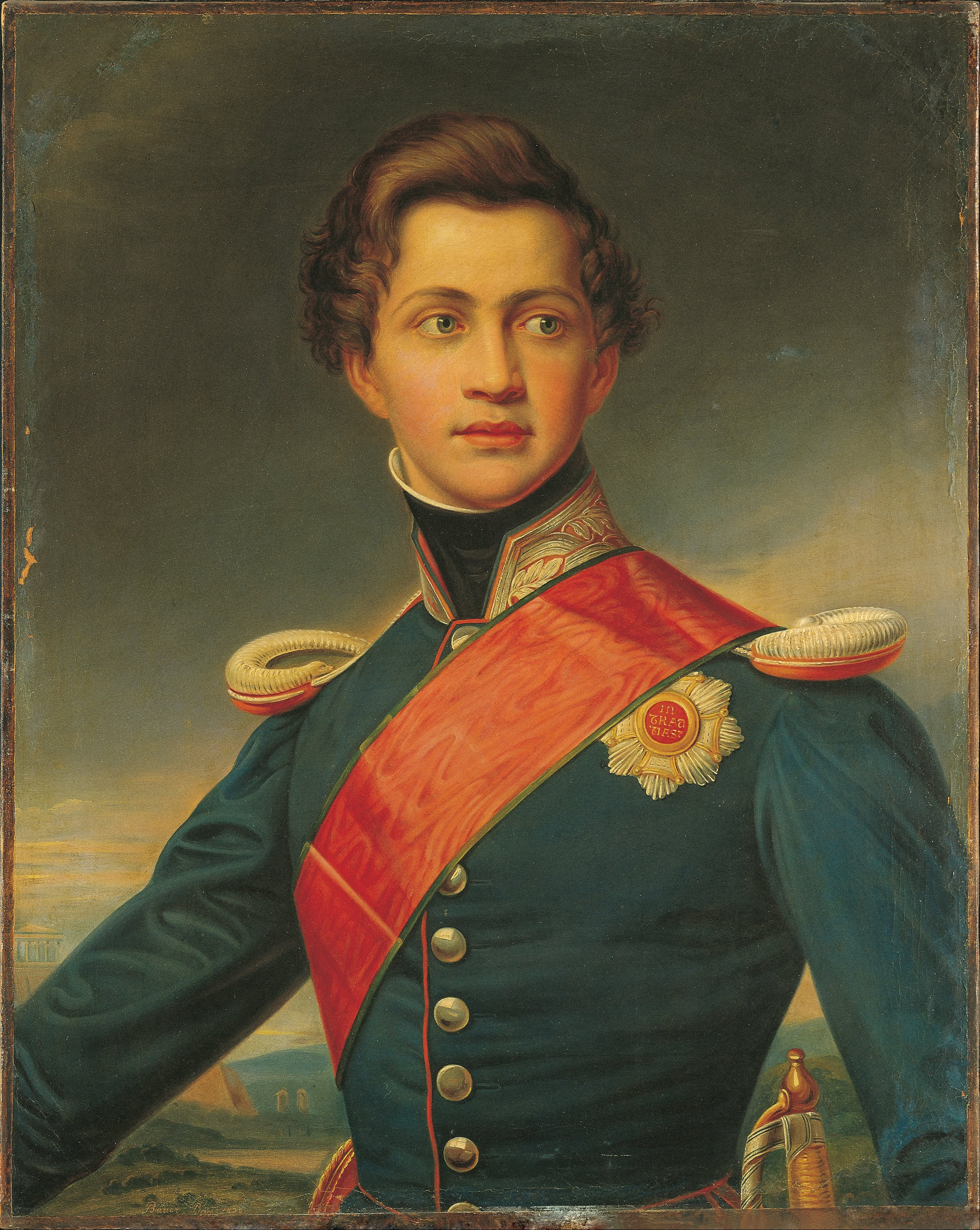
King Otto of Greece.

"O Armatolos" was published on 25 March 1860 for Parlichev's sole purpose of entering it in the Greek royal poetry competition of the Athens University. However, the poem was officially adopted in February the same year by the contest committee of the university. The contest obliged the authors to submit their poems anonymously. The poem was announced as the winner of the competition by the prominent Greek poet Alexandros Rhizos Rhangaves, who was president of the committee. In his autobiography, Parlichev wrote:

I felt an indescribable woolen such as I had never felt ... Excessive joy is more devastating than deep sorrow...

— Parlichev,

According to the Athenian literary journal Pandora, Parlichev revealed himself as the author of the poem, introducing himself as Grigorios Stavridis. Per Parlichev, three days after the poem received the prize in the anonymous competition, he was called by the university authorities to recite the poem to prove he was the author. The laurel wreath as the central prize was presented to him by the Greek king Otto. Together with the first prize he received a cash prize, and a scholarship to several European universities, including Oxford. Rhangaves praised Parlichev as the "living evidence of the presence of Greek culture in an area as remote as Northern Macedonia." However, the literary critics and the public soon after emphasized his non-Greek origin. Parlichev returned to his native town Ohrid and in 1862 became an activist of the movement for the Bulgarian National Revival.

== Legacy ==
The poem was well-received by 19th-century Greek critics. Grigor Parlichev received the epithet "second Homer" from the academics of the Athens University. In 1870, Parlichev translated the poem into Bulgarian. Today, the literary work is considered one of the finest in the creation of the Bulgarian literature and regarded in North Macedonia as the seminal work in the modern national awakening of Macedonians.

== Published translations ==
Year	Bulgarian language	Macedonian language
1895	G. Balastchev, G. Parlichev: Serdaryat, Sofia ♦	
1930	V. Pundev, G. Parlichev: Serdaryat (Literary Work), Sofia ♦	
1944		G. Kiselinov, G. Parlichev: Serdarot, "Makedonija", Skopje †
1946		K. Toshev, G.S. Parlichev: Serdarot, State Publishing Company of Macedonia, Skopje †
1952		K. Kjamilov, Serdarot, Ss. Cyril and Methodius University, Skopje ‡
1953		G. Stalev, G.S. Parlichev: Autobiography. Serdarot, "Kocho Racin", Skopje •
1959		G. Stalev, Selected Pages - Serdarot, "Kocho Racin", Skopje •
1968	M. Arnaudov, G. Parlichev - Serdaryat, "Otechestvenii︠a︡ front", Sofia ♦	G. Stalev, Serdarot - Autobiography, "Misla", Skopje •
1970	A. Germanov, G. Parlichev: Voivoda, "Balgarski Pisatel", Sofia ♦	
♦ - indicates a Bulgarian language translation from the original Greek. † - indicates a Macedonian language translation based on the Bulgarian one. ‡ - indicates publishing of the original translation by Parlichev in Church Slavonic. • - indicates a Macedonian language translation from the original Greek.
Source: XXXVII International Scientific Conference Seminar on Literature, Culture, and Language in Macedonia

== Bibliography ==
- Pandeva, Liljana (2010), XXXVII International Scientific Conference Seminar on Literature, Culture, and Language in Macedonia (PDF), Skopje: Ss. Cyril and Methodius University of Skopje, pp. 1–304, ISBN 978-9989-43-305-4, archived from the original (PDF) on March 4, 2016
- Grigor Parlichev (2003), "Serdarot: Autobiography", Balgarski pisatel, Matica makedonska, pp. 1–130, ISBN 9789989484650
- Kramarić, Zlatko (1991), Makedonske teme i dileme, Zagreb: Nakladni zavod Matice hrvatske, OCLC 608354600
- Dorothea Kadach (1971), Zwei griеchische Gedichte von Grigor S. Prličev, Berlin: Ellenika 24
- Raymond Detrez (1992), Grigor Părličev : een case-study in Balkannationalism (in Dutch), Antwerpen : Restant, OCLC 32204435, OL 19031060M
