= Bitovo =

Bitovo Битово
- Village
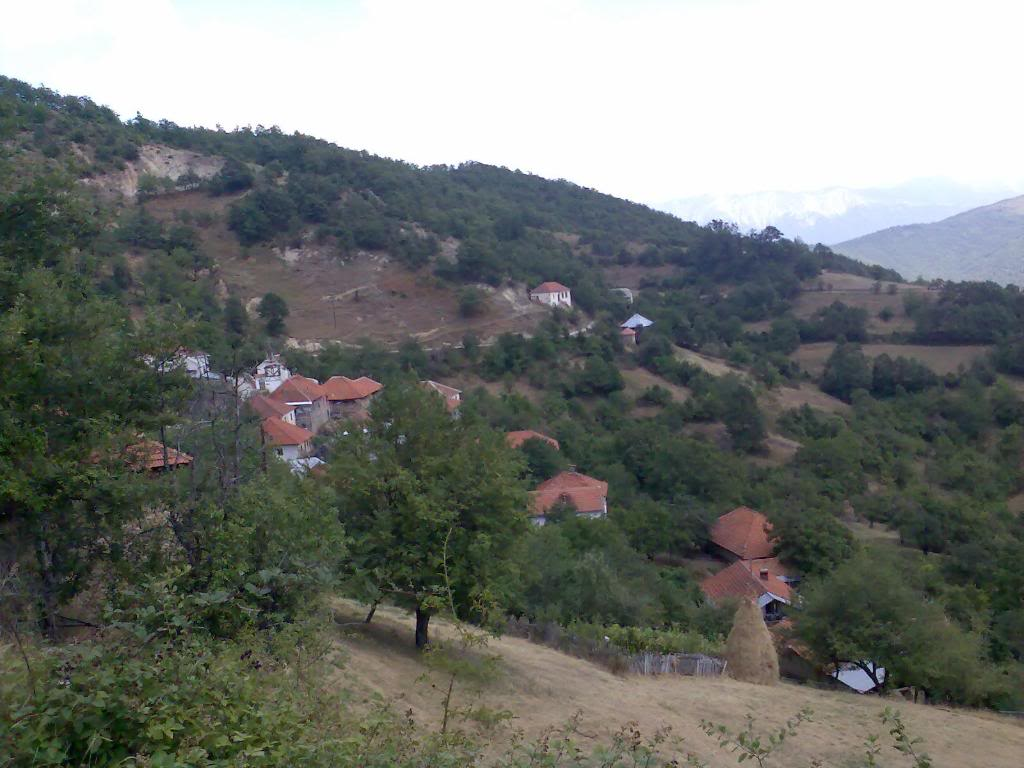
- Village of Bitovo

- Location within North Macedonia
- Country: North Macedonia
- Region: Southwestern
- Municipality: Makedonski Brod

Population (2010)
  - Total: 60
- Time zone: UTC+1 (CET)
  - Summer (DST): UTC+2 (CEST)
- Postal code: 6535
- Area code: +389 45

Bitovo (Macedonian: Битово) is a small village located in the region of Porece in the municipality of Makedonski Brod, North Macedonia. It used to be part of the former municipality of Samokov.

== Demographics ==
The village is attested in the 1467/68 Ottoman tax registry (defter) for the Nahiyah of Kırçova. The village had a total of 10 houses, excluding bachelors (mucerred).

According to the 2002 census, the village had a total of 63 inhabitants. Ethnic groups in the village include:

- Macedonians 63
