= Kobna ubavina =

Kobna ubavina (Terrible Beauty)

Studio album by Mizar
- Released: 2004
- Genre: Progressive rock
- Length: 71:29
- Label: Avalon
- Producer: Mizar

Mizar chronology
Svjat Dreams (1990)	Kobna ubavina (Terrible Beauty) (2004)

Kobna ubavina (lit. Terrible Beauty, English-language title Terrible Beauty Is Born) is the third studio album, released in 2004, by the Macedonian rock band Mizar. It is the first and only album with vocalist Goran Trajkovski. The band changed their style from darkwave and punk to a type of progressive rock.

The track "Juda" was released as a single in 2003, with Pochesna strelba as a B-side, although both are earlier mixes of the tracks.

== Track listing ==
No.	Title	Length
1.	"Amfilohij" (Amphilochius)	5:21
2.	"Pochesna strelba" (Gun Salute)	5:06
3.	"Vo mojot son" (In My Dream)	5:30
4.	"Blood Red Sun (God-Damned Son)"	4:16
5.	"1762"	5:13
6.	"Of Mice and Men"	7:23
7.	"Ova ne e mojot dom" (This Isn't My Home)	6:06
8.	"Juda" (Judas)	4:23
9.	"Razgovor so slepite" (Conversation with the Blind)	5:43
10.	"The Cars Hiss..."	4:04
11.	"Armakedon" (Armageddon)	9:45
12.	"Gradot e nem (Verzija 2004)" (The City is Silent (2004 Version) (Hidden track)	8:38

== Personnel ==
=== Mizar ===
- Goran Trajkovski - vocals
- Gorazd Chapovski - guitar
- Ilija Stojanovski - bass
- Zharko Serafimovski - drums
- Vladimir Kaevski - keyboards

=== Guest and session musicians ===
- Ivan Bejkov - double bass
- Vladimir Pop-Hristov - cello
- Cengis Ibrahim - harp
- Alfrida Tozieva - viola
- Petar Rendzov - extra guitar
