= 1762 leto =

Song by Grigor Parlichev

"1762 лето (1762 leto)"

Song by various artists
- Language: Bulgarian language (according to its author himself)
- Published: c. 1870
- Length: from 4:25 (Mizar version) to approx. 10:00
- Composer: unknown
- Lyricist: Grigor Parlichev

"1762 leto" (Bulgarian: 1762 лето [xiˈʎada i sɛdɛmˈstɔtin ˈʃɛstdɛsɛt i ˈftɔro ˈlɛto] or Песен за унищожението на Охридската патриаршия; Macedonian: 1762 лето [ilˈjada i sɛdɛmˈstɔtin ˈʃɛɛsɛt i ˈftɔrɔ ˈlɛtɔ] or Песна за патрикот, English: The year of 1762) is a song written by Grigor Parlichev, a Bulgarian writer.

The song describes the abolition of the Archbishopric of Ohrid, which took place in 1767, and the departure of its last archbishop Arsenius II from Ohrid. It was very popular in Macedonia, and especially in Ohrid, in the last decades of the nineteenth century. It was first performed in Ohrid shortly after Parlichev's wedding c. 1870. According to Parlichev and other contemporaries, the song contributed more to the final victory of the Bulgarian national movement in Macedonia against the Ecumenical Patriarchate of Constantinople than many of the previous efforts of the Bulgarians.

The text of the song with minor changes was published for the first time by Vasil Kanchov in Sofia in 1891. The song was originally published in the Bulgarian periodical science magazine "Collection of folklore, science and literature" in Sofia, Bulgaria (1894).

In 1953 the song was translated and published for the first time in Macedonian by Todor Dimitrovski in "Avtobiografija; Serdarot, Skopje, 1953, Kočo Racin", to mark the 60th anniversary of his death. Two popular Macedonian recordings of the song are by Ansambl Biljana in 1974 and Mizar in 1991. The Mizar rendition of the song is based in a darkwave style.
