= Kuzman Kapidan =

Legendary hero from Ohrid area

Kuzman Kapidan (Bulgarian: Кузман Капитан; Macedonian: Кузман Капидан) or Kuzman Karamak or Kuzman voivode or Kuzman Kareman is a popular legendary hero of Bulgarian, and Macedonian epic poetry. His figure is based on the historical person who initially was a hajduk, then - serdar (kapidan is corruption of captain) in service of Dželadin-bey (Albanian: Xheladin bej Ohri), a governor of Ohrid kaza at the beginning of 19th century. He defeated the bands of the robbers Osman Mura and Dervish Mucha. According to some legends, he was poisoned by his enemies, and according to others he was killed in battle. His struggle against bandits was still alive among Macedonians in the 20th century, especially in Debarca region, from where he operated and from where he allegedly descended. He is commemorated in numerous epic songs, including O Armatolos, an award-winning poem written by the 19th-century Bulgarian poet Grigor Parlichev.

== Historical background ==
At the beginning of the 19th century region of Ohrid belonged to Ottoman Empire and had status of kaza of the Sanjak of Ohri. Its governor was Dželadin-bey who had to maintain balance between Ottoman porte on one side and Ali Pasha, the leader of the bands of brigands in the neighbouring Pashalik of Yanina, on another. The bands of Ali Pasha frequently robbed neighbouring territories, including the territory under control of Dželadin-bey. Dželadin-bey belonged to influential group of Ottoman officials at western Balkans who resisted reforms to protect their possessions they forcibly confiscated from other people. This is how Dželadin-bey "earned" around 100 chifliks on the territory of the kaza he controlled. To better resist them Ottomans had to mobilize local Christians to help their regular military forces to guard mountain passes toward Albania. When Kuzman died his son Đore inherited his position and continued to protect their kaza with his forces consisting of both Albanians and Macedonian Slavs.
