= Barbaros, Makedonski Brod =

Barbaros Барбарос
- Village
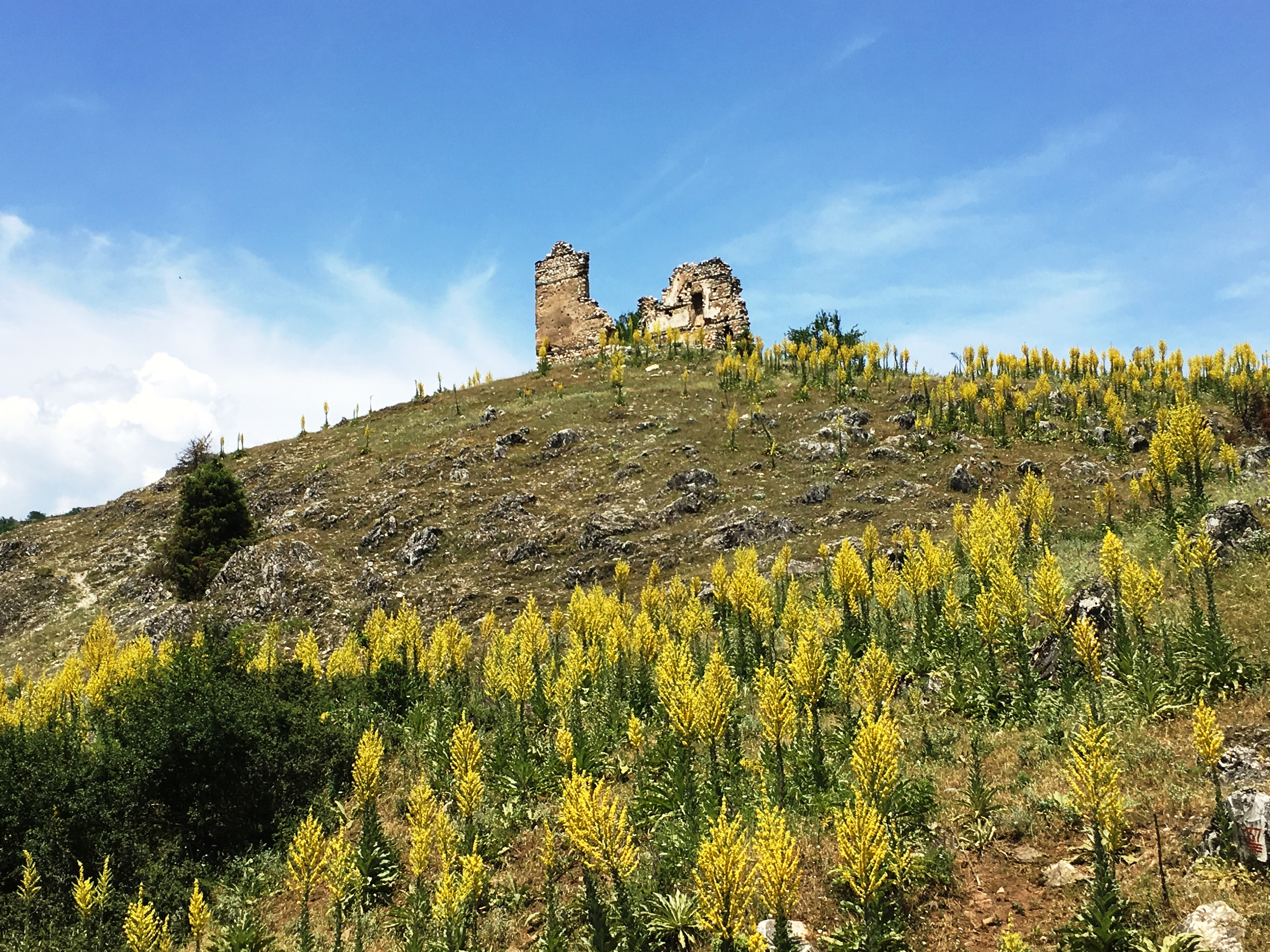
- Ruins in Barbaros
- Interactive map of Barbaros
- Coordinates: 41°30′29″N 21°16′27″E
- Country: North Macedonia
- Municipality: Makedonski Brod
- Region: Poreče
- Elevation: 905 m (2,969 ft)

Population (2002)
  - Total: 0

Barbaros (also known as Barbaras) is a former village in the Makedonski Brod Municipality, in the area of Poreče, near the town of Makedonski Brod in North Macedonia. The village no longer exists, and only remnants of it remain.

The village was located near the locality Barbaros, at the eponymous pass on the road Makedonski Brod-Prilep, at the crossing from Porečе to Prilep Plain.

== History ==
Barbaros is attested in the 1467/68 Ottoman tax registry (defter) for the Nahiyah of Kičevo. The village had a total of 62 households.

In the 19th century, Barbaros was a village in the nahiyah of Poreče of the kaza of Kičevo of the Ottoman Empire.

== Demographics ==
The village is attested in the 1467/68 Ottoman tax registry (defter) for the Nahiyah of Kičevo. The village had a total of 57 houses, excluding bachelors (mucerred).

The "Ethnography of Adrianople, Monastir and Thessalonica" states that in 1873 the village had 6 households with 25 Bulgarian Exarchists.

== Landmarks and sights ==
In the outskirts of the village, there is the archaeological site of a Medieval settlement and a castle called Kula (lit. Tower).

== Gallery ==
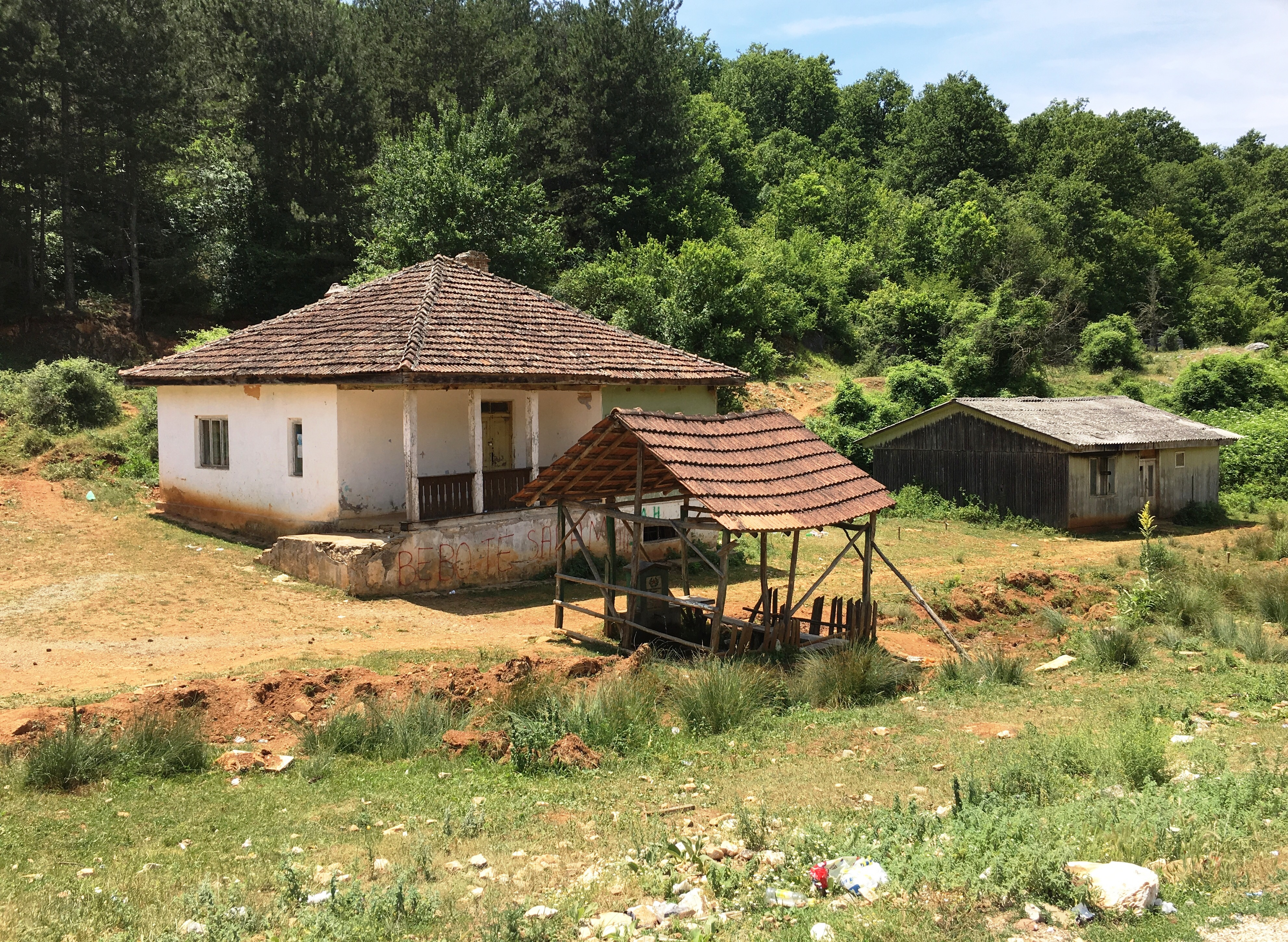
Buildings in the village

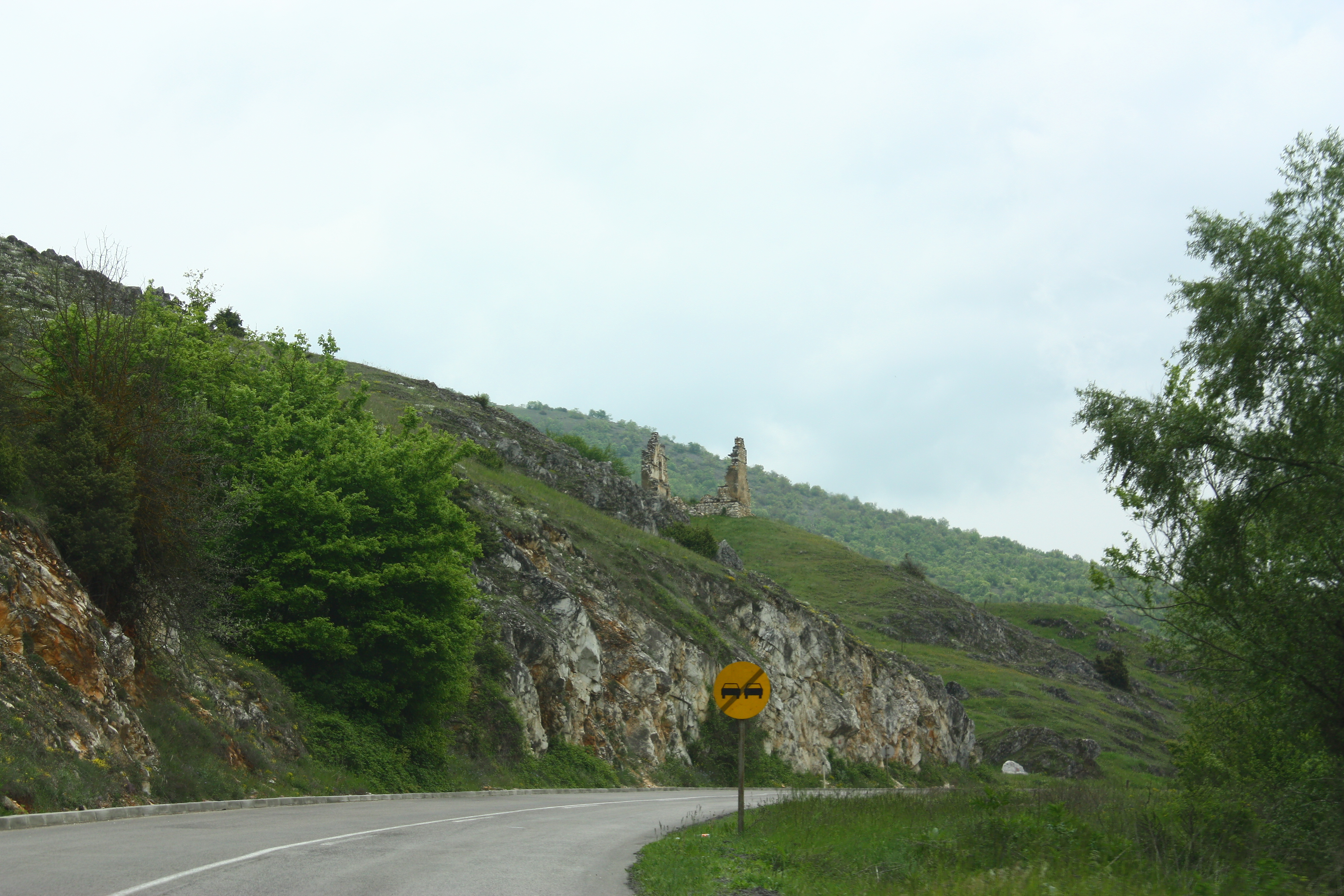
Barbaros Pass

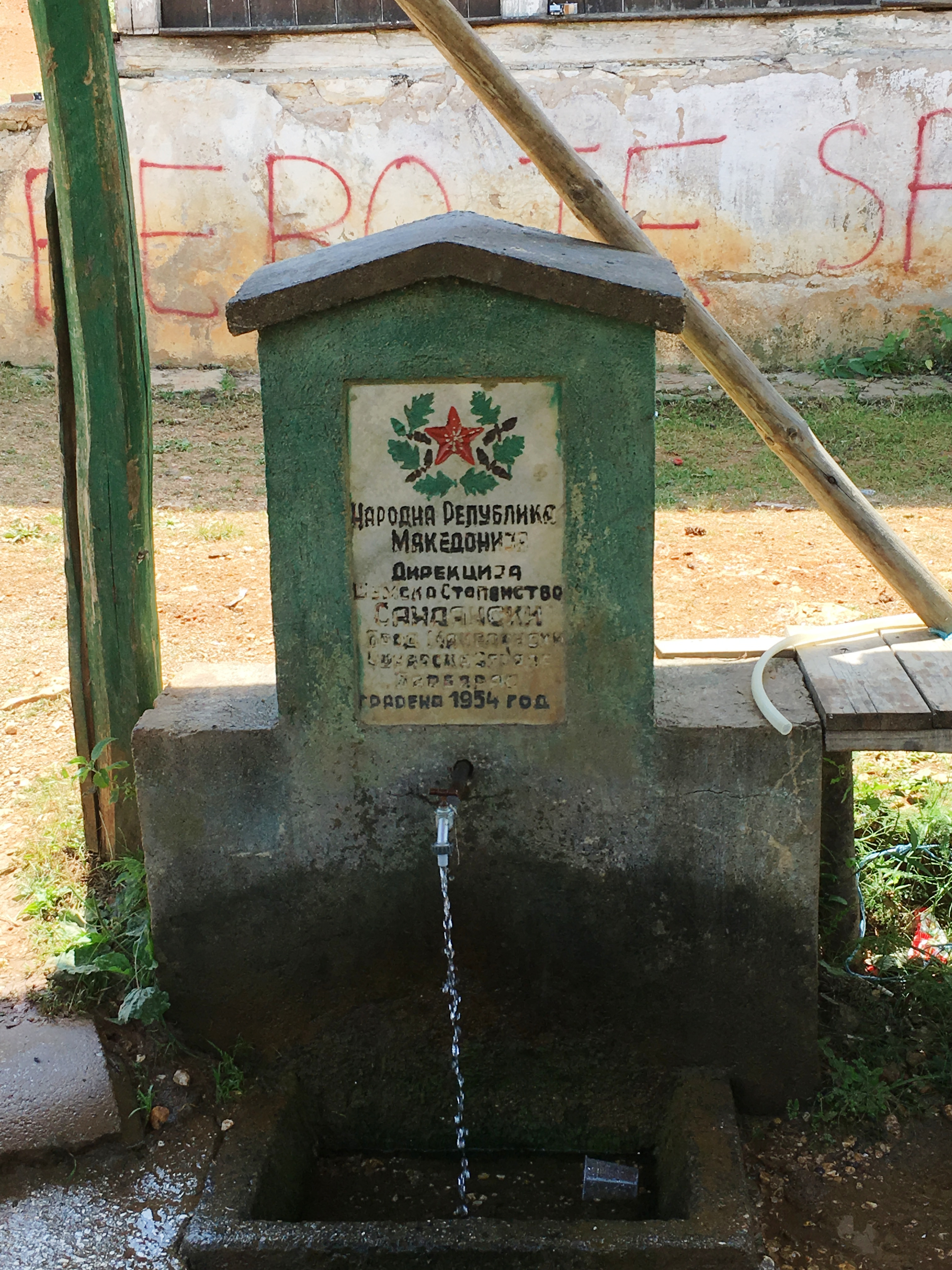
Memorial fountain

== See also ==
- Makedonski Brod Municipality
- Poreče
