= Svjat Dreams 1762–1991 =

Studio album by Mizar
- Released: 7 September 1991
- Recorded: October–December 1990, Jatagan Studios, Skopje
- Genres: Darkwave; Gothic rock
- Length: 38:13
- Labels: Amarkord/Helidon; Lithium (2003 re-release)

Mizar chronology
Mizar (1988)	Svjat Dreams 1762–1991 (1991)	Terrible Beauty (2004)

Svjat Dreams 1762–1991, known by fans as simply Svjat Dreams, was released on 7 September 1991, and is the 2nd studio album to be released by the group Mizar. It was the last album by the group before they broke up in 1992, but they reformed in 2003.

== Track listing ==
Original Album
No.	Title	Length
1.	"1762"	4:26
2.	"Glas" (Voice)	4:00
3.	"Dumanje" (Think)	6:09
4.	"Dom" (House (Risto Vrtev))	2:55
5.	"Veligden" (Easter)	3:27
6.	"Svjat Dreams" (World Dreams)	3:36
7.	"Da peam pesna" (I Sing This Song)	3:36
8.	"Otrov vo venite" (Poison in Our Veins)	3:09
9.	"Obichen chovek" (Normal Man)	2:30
10.	"Abja mem"	4:23

Lithium Records Bonus Tracks
No.	Title	Length
11.	"Da peam pesna (live)"	4:23
12.	"Stareesh" (Older)	4:49
13.	"The Fog"	3:59

"Da peam pesna" was recorded sometime in 1990 at the Kurshumli in Skopje. "Stareesh" is a demo recording from March 1989 and previously appeared in a live version on the Svedozhba bootleg as "Samo eden mig", which was recorded at Kurshumli in 1990 and had an extra two-minute interlude. "The Fog" was recorded in 1993 in Australia and is an English version of "Magla" from the debut album. It is also one of the first recordings by Kismet, despite a note on the back of the CD case stating it is Mizar's last recording. Track 6 is a cover of the Eurythmics hit "Sweet Dreams (Are Made of This)".

== Release history ==
Svjat Dreams was actually released on two labels. It was released on vinyl and cassette by Amarkord, a vanity label set up by Mizar to self-publish the release. The Amarkord vinyl was pressed up by Jugoton. Since Mizar's contract with Helidon had not ended at the time of release, they released the album on cassette (although the cassette had a different cover to the Amarkord one: the Amarkord cassette is just the LP cover sandwiched between two grey-white bars, while the Helidon tape's artwork is just the original artwork reformatted for cassette) and CD. Helidon releases also did not have the red ribbon that the Amarkord vinyl came with. The Mizar logo on Helidon releases was also red instead of black. When the album was repackaged and reissued by Lithium in 2003, however, the ribbon was integrated into the CD artwork. The Helidon release is preferred among audiophiles for its high dynamic range. The Lithium reissue included three bonus tracks.

No lyrics have been published for the title track, however it seems to be a translation of "Sweet Dreams (Are Made of This)" by Eurythmics translated into Old Church Slavonic and set to a traditional Slavic music backing. A darker sounding earlier version of the track was recorded in 1989, with Goran Tanevski on all instruments, and released on the Svedozhba bootleg in 1997 before finally getting an official release in 2013 on the Balkan Under the Radar compilation. Writing credits are given to "D. Steward" on the lyric sheet (which only gives lyrics to "1762" and "Dumanje").

== Personnel ==
- Goran Tanevski - vocals
- Gorazd Chapovski - guitar
- Ilija Stojanovski - bass
- Zharko Serafimovski - drums
- Vladimir Kaevski - keyboards
