= Belica =

Belica may refer to:

- Belica, Međimurje County, a village and municipality in Croatia
- Belica, Dobrova–Polhov Gradec, a settlement in Slovenia
- Belica, Osilnica, a settlement in Slovenia
- Belica (river), a river in Serbia
- Belica, Jagodina, a village in Serbia
- Belica, Makedonski Brod, a village in North Macedonia
- Belica, Kičevo, a village in North Macedonia
- Belica, town in Second Polish Republic prior to Soviet invasion of Poland; now Belitsa, Belarus
- Belica, a small fish, the Moderlieschen (Leucaspius delineatus)

== See also ==
- Belitsa (disambiguation)
