= Mizar: The Star of Hope =

- Film poster
- Мизар: Ѕвезда на надежта
- Directed by: Marko Dzambazoski
- Written by: Marko Dzambazoski
- Starring: Gorazd Chapovski; Panta Dzambazoski; Goran Tanevski; Ilija Stojanovski; Slobodan Stojkov
- Cinematography: Aleksandar Risteski
- Edited by: Marko Dzambazoski
- Production company: FDA - Skopje
- Release date: 27 April 2014 (Skopje Film Festival)
- Running time: 17 minutes
- Language: Macedonian

Mizar: The Star of Hope (Macedonian: Мизар: Ѕвезда на надежта) is a Macedonian 2014 documentary film written and directed by Marko Dzambazoski. It is the first documentary film for one of the most successful Macedonian bands, Mizar.

== Plot ==
The film tells the story of the beginnings of the legendary Macedonian band "Mizar", the tough path in which from ordinary garage band, Mizar becomes one of the most important bands in the history of the Macedonian rock culture.

== Release ==
The film's world premiere took place on 27 August 2014, on the Skopje Film Festival. After that, the film was shown at many festivals in the Balkans including DORF (Croatia), MakeDox (Macedonia), Starigrad Paklenica Film Festival (Croatia), KRAF (Serbia), Gitarijada (Serbia), and Greece.
