= Grigor Parlichev =

Bulgarian writer (1830–1893)

Grigor Stavrev Parlichev
- Григор Пърличев
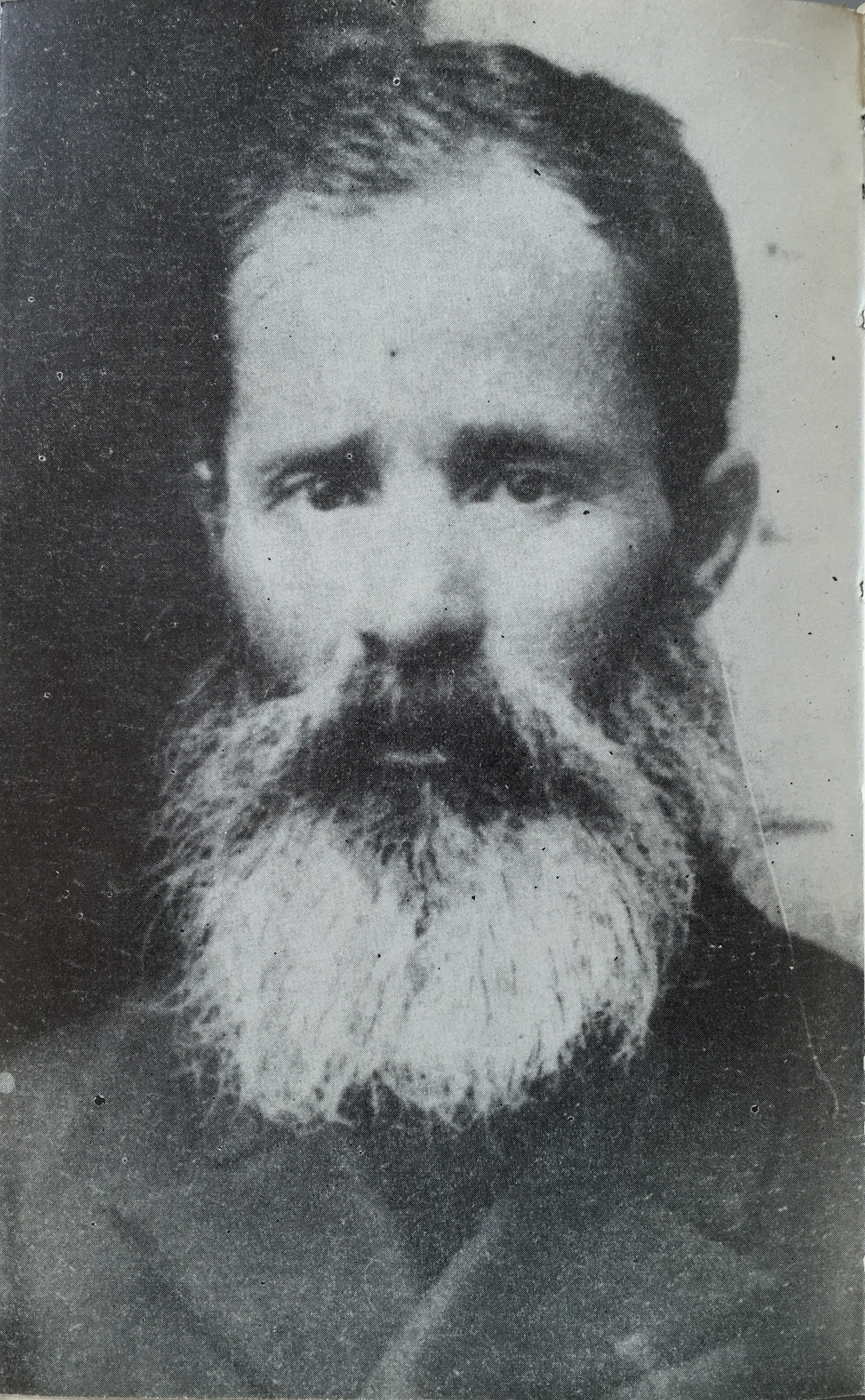
- Parlichev c. 1890
- Born: 18 January 1830; Ohrid, Rumelia Eyalet, Ottoman Empire
- Died: 25 January 1893 (aged 63); Ohrid, Manastir Vilayet, Ottoman Empire
- Occupations: Poet, writer, and teacher
- Children: 5, including Kiril
- Writing career
- Pen name: Grigorios Stavridis (for his Greek works)
- Language: Bulgarian and Greek
- Period: Bulgarian National Revival
- Notable works: O Armatolos; 1762 leto Autobiography
- Notable awards: 1st prize, Athens University Poetry Competition (1860)

Grigor Stavrev Parlichev (Bulgarian: Григор Ставрев Пърличев; Macedonian: Григор Ставрев Прличев, romanized: Grigor Stavrev Prličev; 18 January 1830 – 25 January 1893), also known as Grigorios Stavridis (Greek: Γρηγόριος Σταυρίδης), was a Bulgarian writer, teacher and translator. He received acclaim as a "second Homer" in Greece for his poem O Armatolos. Afterwards, he became a Bulgarian national activist. Parlichev was subject to criticism by contemporary Bulgarian figures for what they regarded as poor knowledge of Bulgarian. His other notable works include the poems Skenderbeg, 1762 leto, and his autobiographical work Autobiography. In North Macedonia and Bulgaria, he is regarded as a pioneer of national awakening, but his national identity has been also disputed between both countries.

== Life ==
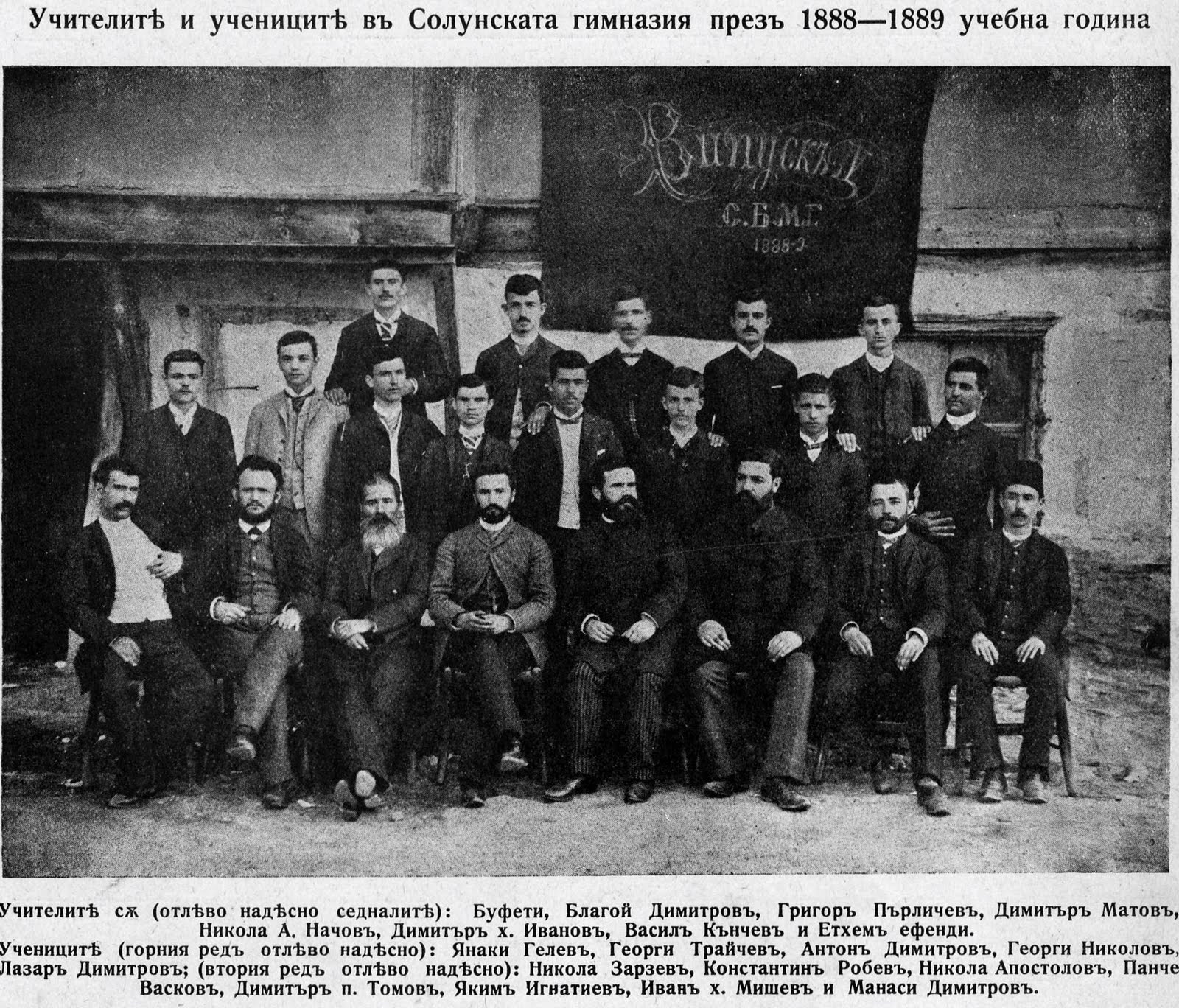
Teachers and students from the Bulgarian Men's High School of Thessaloniki, 1888/1889. Parlichev is the third man with the white beard, sitting from left to right in the first row.

Grigor Parlichev was born on 18 January 1830 in Ohrid, Ottoman Empire (present-day North Macedonia), the fourth child of Maria Gyokova and Stavre Parlichev, a craftsman. He was six months old when his father died. His paternal grandfather, a farmer, took over the care of the family. He was taught to read Greek by his grandfather. Parlichev studied in a Greek school in Ohrid. He was taught by Dimitar Miladinov. In the 1830s, he learned from Orthodox liturgical texts in Ohrid.

In 1839 or 1840, his grandfather died. His family lived in poverty. Parlichev's mother worked as a house servant, while he also contributed to the living of his family by selling goods at the market and copying Greek handwritings. In 1848–1849, he was a teacher in a Greek school in Tirana, probably in Greek. There, he experienced homesickness. He went to Athens to study medicine in 1849 but lacking money to pay for his studies, he returned to Ohrid the following year. In the 1850s, he worked as a teacher in Dolna Belica, Bitola, Prilep and Ohrid. In this period, he was seen as a "Grecoman" by his contemporaries. His enthusiasm for Greek literature (especially Homer) caused him to be more prone to Greek nationalism than his fellow citizens, who were not interested in literature. In 1858 Parlichev returned to Athens to study medicine in the second year, but later transferred to the Faculty of Linguistics. Adopting the Hellenized form of his name, Grigorios Stavridis, in 1860 he took part in the annual poetry competition in Athens, winning first prize for his poem "O Armatolos" (Greek: Ο Αρματωλός), written in Greek. Acclaimed as "second Homer" and given a bursary to study abroad, he gave part of it to a poor student and spent the rest of it. He recognized "Hellas as his homeland he worked and laboured for, and stated that his only desire was to contribute to the great cause of the Greek palingenesis". Fellow contestant Theodoros Orphanidis, who did not accept the result, accused him of being a Bulgarian and associated him with Bulgarian propaganda, citing his signature as "G. Stavridis, Bulgarian Philhellene" in a copy of his work as proof. In response to the accusation, he said for the newspaper Light that he "had feelings and a heart incomparably more Hellenic than Orfanidis". He declared multiple times that he had a "Hellenic heart". Despite this, per philologist Małgorzata Borowska, he did not have a warm reception in Athenian society. In 1862, he wrote another poem titled "Skenderbeg" (Greek: Σκενδέρμπεης) in Greek, with which he participated in the poetry competition, but the jury did not award it, although it impressed them. Parlichev also wrote orations and poems for children in his Ohrid dialect, often in the Greek alphabet. After the death of his teacher Dimitar Miladinov in 1862, he returned to Ohrid.

Upon his return, he became familiar with the Bulgarian language and the Cyrillic script. Parlichev continued to teach Greek for a living. He encouraged the Bulgarians of Ohrid to send a petition to the Ottoman sultan for the restoration of the Archbishopric of Ohrid in May 1867. In May 1868, he went to Istanbul (Constantinople) to study the Church Slavonic language. After studying, he returned to Ohrid in November. In the same year, he advocated for the use of Bulgarian in the schools and churches. He also replaced Greek with Bulgarian in the Ohrid school where he was a teacher. Parlichev was arrested and spent several months in an Ottoman jail in Debar after a complaint was sent by the Greek bishop of Ohrid Meletius due to his activities.

He married Anastasiya Hristova Uzunova in 1869 and had five children: Konstantinka, Luisa, Kiril, Despina and Georgi. In the 1870s, Marko Balabanov and the other editors of the magazine Chitalishte (Reading room) in Istanbul made him the suggestion to translate Homer's Iliad into Bulgarian. In 1870 Parlichev translated his award-winning poem "O Armatolos" into Bulgarian in an attempt to popularize his earlier works, which were written in Greek, among the Bulgarian audience. Parlichev was the first Bulgarian translator of Iliad in 1871. However, he was criticized by Bulgarian literary critics because they considered his knowledge of Bulgarian as poor. Parlichev used a specific mixture of Church Slavonic, Bulgarian, Russian and his native Ohrid dialect. In 1872, he published the poem called 1762 leto. After the establishment of the Bulgarian Exarchate, the first Bulgarian metropolitan Nathanael of Ohrid came to Ohrid in 1874. Parlichev wrote an ode in his honor, but soon a conflict emerged between the two for unknown reasons. He was transferred and then removed from his teaching position in Ohrid. Parlichev went to teach in Struga, Sofia and Bitola.

He worked as a teacher in Gabrovo in 1879–1880 but was not satisfied with the climate and dialect there. In 1883 Parlichev moved to Thessaloniki where he taught at the Thessaloniki Bulgarian Male High School from 1883 to 1889. During his stay there he wrote his autobiography between 1884 and 1885. The Parlichev family suffered from financial problems in Thessaloniki. According to historian Raymond Detrez, who received his PhD thesis on Parlichev, Parlichev often behaved like a tyrant towards his family and often resorted to fighting. His son Kiril wrote regarding him and his wife:

A temperament like his would be hard for any woman to endure. But Anastasia Hristova Uzunova (...), who became his companion in life, carried her heavy cross to the end without complaint and with complete devotion to her duty. The not-so-gentle husband Parlichev fully deservedly pays her his respects.

Regarding his marital life, Kuzman Shapkarev wrote:

And why did he always beat his almost meek, like a fly, and honest wife, many times even in her most serious moments, in times of leisure, and even with kicks on her stomach - as we had the unfortunate opportunity to see with our own eyes in 1884 in Thessaloniki, in our house, where we had given him a room for temporary living? And why did he also run from house to house with an axe in his hand after his brother-in-law, the late D. Uzunov, to hit him?

Per Detrez, his aggression was due to his alcoholism, which he himself alluded to in his autobiography and which his friends and colleagues also mentioned in their memoirs. After his retirement in 1890, he returned to Ohrid, where he lived with a pension until his death on 25 January 1893.

=== Identification and views ===
Parlichev was part of the Rum millet. In the 1860s, after identifying as Greek, he began identifying as Bulgarian. In the last decade of his life, he adhered to a form of vague local Macedonian patriotism, though continued to identify himself as a Bulgarian. Thus, in the context of discussions about the existence of the Macedonian nation, his national identity became disputed between Bulgarian and Macedonian (literary) historians. However, he never identified himself as an ethnic Macedonian. As a Bulgarian national activist, he used German historian Jakob Fallmerayer's discontinuity thesis against the Greeks. In his autobiography, he wrote that the Bulgarians had been scorned and abused enough by other peoples and advised them to become aware of themselves, instead of despising themselves, to become confident of their abilities and rely on their hard work to achieve progress. In 1889, under a translation, he signed himself as "Gr. S. Părličev, killed by the Bulgarians" (Гр. С. Пърличевъ, убитий българами).

=== Language ===
As a child, Parlichev learned to write excellent Greek and later wrote in his autobiography that he mastered literary Greek better than a native speaker. He started learning to read and write in Bulgarian only after his return from Athens in 1862. In his autobiography, Parlichev wrote: "I was, and I am still weak with the Bulgarian language," and "In Greek I sang like a swan, now in Slavic I cannot even sing like a donkey." His native Ohrid dialect was different from the eastern Bulgarian dialects. Parlichev also wanted to include more Russian elements into Bulgarian. He combined Church Slavonic, Russian and Bulgarian words, elements and forms, as well as from his native dialect, which per Detrez was called "common Slavic". Because of this, he was criticized for his translation of Homer's Iliad. Contemporary Bulgarian writers, such as Hristo Botev and Lyuben Karavelov, mocked his translation. Botev mocked it in the satirical poem Why I'm not?, while Karavelov referred to Parlichev as "an empty pumpkin". According to Bulgarian historian Roumen Daskalov, he stopped identifying as Bulgarian as he had not mastered literary Bulgarian and was mocked by his critics. Per Daskalov, Parlichev reacted against his Bulgarian literary critics by eventually withdrawing into "an alternative Macedonian regional identity, a kind of Macedonian particularism." However, when he came to write his autobiography, Parlichev used the standard Bulgarian language with some influence of his native Ohrid dialect.

=== Legacy ===
The cover of Parlichev's autobiography, published by the Bulgarian Ministry of Education in the magazine Folklore and Ethnography Collection, a year after his death in 1893.

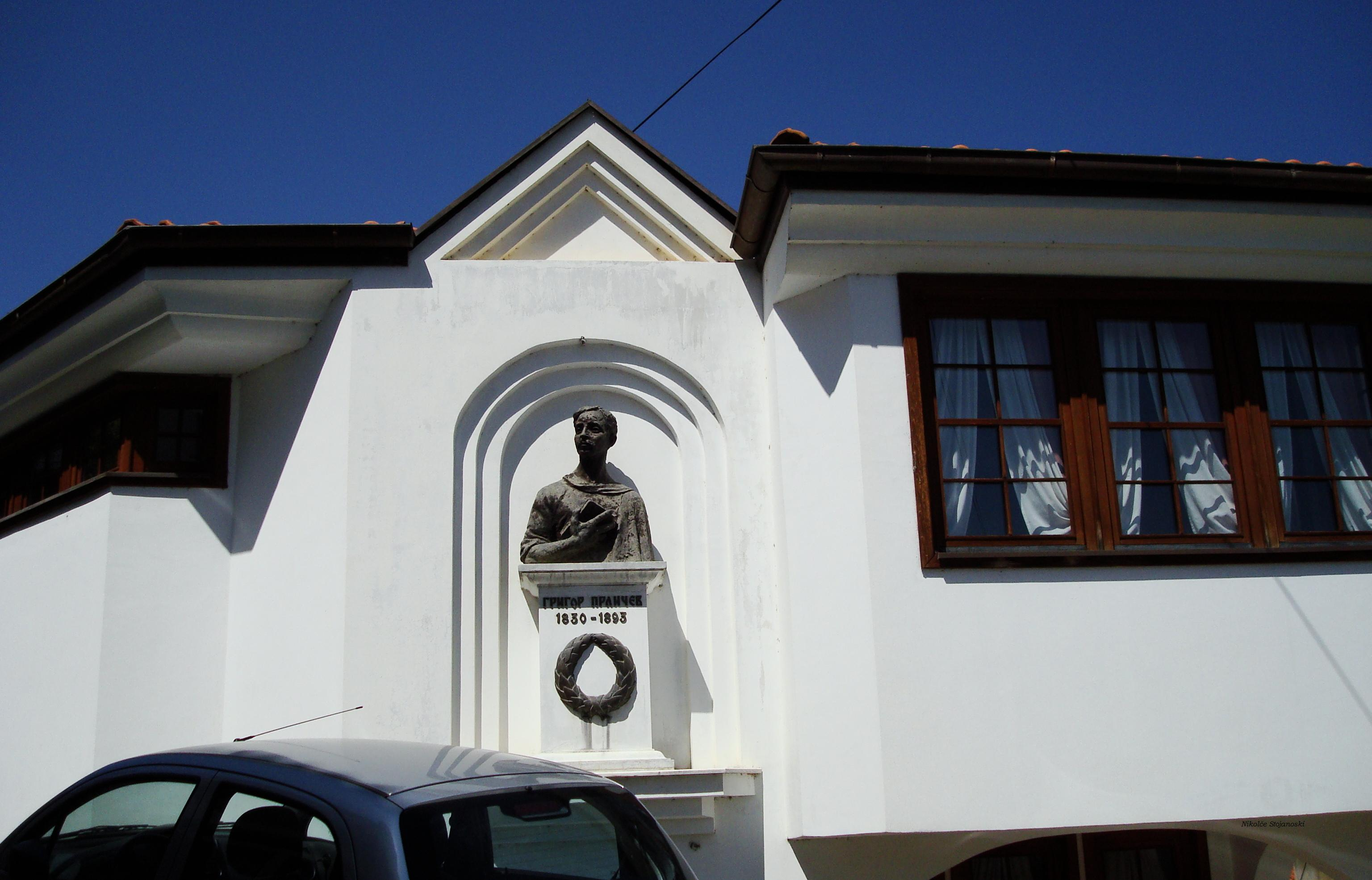
The house of Grigor Prličev in Ohrid, North Macedonia

His autobiography was published posthumously in Sofia in a Bulgarian periodical called Folklore and Ethnography Collection, produced by the Bulgarian Ministry of Education, in 1894. His son Kiril Parlichev became a prominent member of the revolutionary movement in Macedonia and a Bulgarian public figure. After World War II, he was declared as an ethnic Macedonian in Socialist Republic of Macedonia. Both North Macedonia and Bulgaria regard him as a pioneer of national awakening. He is also considered as a founding father of their national literatures. General histories of Greek literature have not included him, with Bulgarian and Macedonian scholars attributing the involvement of Parlichev in the anti-Greek national movement in the 1860s and 1870s as the reason for the non-inclusion. Per Detrez, the more probable reason is that Parlichev was only a minor figure of the Athenian Romantic school. The Bulgarian historiography regards his Greek sympathies as delusions, while the Macedonian historiography treats his Bulgarian sympathies identically. Streets in Bulgaria are named after him. The Parlichev Ridge in Antarctica is named after him. A digital monument honoring him was set up in the center of Ohrid in 2022.

== See also ==
- Miladinov Brothers
- Bulgarian Millet
- Macedonian nationalism
