= Belitsa (disambiguation) =

Belitsa may refer to:

- In Bulgaria (written in Cyrillic as Белица):
  - Belitsa - a town in the Belitsa municipality, Blagoevgrad province
  - Belitsa Municipality - a municipality in the Blagoevgrad province
  - Belitsa, Gabrovo Province - a village in the Tryavna municipality, Gabrovo province
  - Belitsa, Haskovo Province - a village in the Lyubimets municipality, Haskovo province
  - Belitsa, Plovdiv Province - a village in the Laki municipality, Plovdiv province
  - Belitsa, Silistra Province - a village in the Tutrakan municipality, Silistra province
  - Belitsa, Sofia Province - a village in the Ihtiman municipality, Sofia province

== See also ==
- Belica (disambiguation)
