= Goran Trajkoski =

Macedonian musician (born 1963)

- Born: Goran Trajkoski; 21 November 1963 (age 62); Veles, Republic of Macedonia
- Origin: Struga, Republic of Macedonia
- Genres: Punk, post-punk, dark wave, gothic rock, electronic, ethnic
- Occupations: Vocalist, musician, songwriter
- Years active: 1979–present

Goran Trajkoski (Macedonian: Горан Трајкоски) (born 21 November 1963) is a Macedonian musician. He rose to international prominence as a frontman of the group Anastasija which was featured on the soundtrack album for the Academy Award-nominated movie Before the Rain directed by Milčo Mančevski. He started his musical career as a member of the punk rock band Afektiven naboj from Struga. After moving to Skopje he joined the punk band Saraceni led by Vladimir Petrovski Karter. Later he was a vocalist of the influential 1980s group Padot na Vizantija. He played bass guitar in the Macedonian cult band Mizar from 1986 until 1987. After the reunion of Mizar in the 2000s, Goran Trajkovski became its new frontman. He is also involved in solo projects, for instance as an author of electronic music under the pseudonym Gotra (Готра) as well as a composer for film soundtracks and theatre music.

== See also ==
- Music of the Republic of Macedonia
- Anastasija
- Mizar
- Padot na Vizantija
- Arhangel
- Punk rock in Yugoslavia

== Bibliography ==
- "Mizar - 20 years after" by Miodrag Mišolić at the Mizar Official Website (in Macedonian)
- Dragan Pavlov and Dejan Šunjka "Punk u Jugoslaviji" (Punk in Yugoslavia), publisher: IGP Dedalus, Yugoslavia, 1990 (in Serbian, Croatian, and Slovene)
