= Kismet (band) =

Australian darkwave band

- Origin: Melbourne, Australia (early); Skopje, Macedonia (later)
- Genres: Dark folk; avant-garde; dark wave
- Years active: 1993-2002
- Past members: (last lineup, 2000-2002): Gorazd Chapovski; Ilija Stojanovski; Biljana Volcheska; Dimitar Petrov; Zoran Origjanski

Kismet were an Australian darkwave band, formed in 1993 by Macedonian immigrant and ex-Mizar guitarist Gorazd Chapovski after that band's breakup in 1991 and his relocation to Australia shortly after.

== History ==
Kismet were formed in 1993 by Chapovski. His Mizar bandmate Ilija Stojanovski joined him on bass. The band's first three recordings were "The Fog" (an English-language remake of the Mizar song "Magla"), "Heaven in Asia" and "Sister Tonight", all featuring Australian vocalist Kerry Smith. The latter two songs were released at the end of 1993 on the Fresh Tracks Series 14 compilation in Australia, while "The Fog" remained unreleased until a 2003 reissue of Mizar's album Svjat Dreams 1762-1991, where it was incorrectly listed as the "last Mizar song". "Heaven in Asia" would be released on Macedonian Document, Step 1, a compilation of Macedonian alternative rock music, in 1994.

The group released their first EP, Dormant Dire, in 1994, followed by a full-length, Damjan's War, in 1995. In 1997, they signed to the Tone Casualties label in the US, releasing an album, Wake Up Gods shortly after. In 1999, the group released the North Atlantic Balkan Express album, which had used working titles "The Tank" and "Black General". That year, they moved back to Macedonia, contributing two tracks to a tribute album to Mizar and coordinating the project. They got a Macedonian record deal with Avalon Produkcija, releasing the Dreaming LP in 2002.

The band broke up that year and Chapovski reconvened Mizar.

== Discography ==
- Fresh Tracks Series 14 (1993) - Kismet contributed "Heaven in Asia" and "Sister Tonight"
- Macedonian Document Step 1 (1994) - Kismet contributed "Heaven in Asia"
- Dormant Dire (1994)
- Damjan's War (1995)
- Wake Up Gods (1997)
- North Atlantic Balkan Express (1999)
- Tribute to Mizar (2001) - Kismet contributed "Dom" and "Istekuvam"
- Dreaming (2002)
- Svjat Dreams 1762-1991 (CD reissue, 2003) - Kismet contributed "The Fog"
  - Incorrectly listed as the "last song by Mizar".
