= Terrible Beauty (novel) =

1999 novel by Peter T. King

Terrible Beauty is the first novel by New York congressman Peter T. King. The book, published in 1999, is set in Northern Ireland in the 1980s. Its protagonist, Bernadette Hanlon, becomes involved with the Irish Republican Army after her husband is framed for the murder of a British soldier. The title is taken from the W. B. Yeats poem Easter, 1916.

The book received some notice when President Clinton was seen carrying it as he exited a helicopter. Publishers Weekly found the book to be "propaganda-heavy". Thomas Oliphant of The Boston Globe called it a "a riveting portrait of Belfast life in the early 1980s". The Washington Post columnist Mary McGrory said it was "not so much a novel as a tract", but valuable for its insight into the political situation in Ireland. In the Irish Echo, James E. Mulvaney had some criticisms of King's dialogue and plotting, but praised it overall as "an essential book for students of Irish history."

A follow-up novel, Deliver Us From Evil, was published in 2002, and introduced the character Congressman Sean Cross, who is wrongly suspected in the murder of an IRA informer and is helped by President Clinton. The Cross character, generally regarded as a stand in for the author, is also featured in King's third novel, Vale of Tears, published in 2003.
