= Padot na Vizantija =

Macedonian post-punk, darkwave and gothic rock band

Падот на Византија (The fall of Byzantium)
- Origin: Struga, North Macedonia
- Genres: Post-punk, darkwave, Byzantine Music, gothic rock
- Members: Goran Trajkoski vocals Klime Kovačeski guitar Zoran Dabić guitar Špend Ibrahim drums Sami Ibrahim bass

Padot na Vizantija (Macedonian: Падот на Византија, English: The Fall of Byzantium) was an influential 1980s post-punk, darkwave and gothic rock band with occasional Byzantine music elements from Struga, SR Macedonia. The group is notable for its guitar player Klime Kovačeski and vocalist Goran Trajkoski who rose to international prominence as a frontman of the group Anastasia which was featured on the soundtrack album for the Academy Award-nominated movie Before the Rain directed by Milčo Mančevski. The most prominent tracks by Padot na Vizantija are Night Over Yugoslavia (Ноќ Над Југославија), Beginning and End (Почеток и Крај), The Same Situation After All (Сепак истата состојба) and Horse Riders (Коњаници). They performed in Skopje, Kumanovo, Štip, Niš, Banja Luka, Sarajevo and Zagreb among others.

The song The Same Situation After All is included in the Macedonian Document (Македонски Документ) compilation album along with other prominent alternative Macedonian artists.

Outside of music, the lead guitar of Padot na Vizantija- Zoran Dabić has had a long career as a senior diplomat. Previously, he worked as a Director for Collective Security Systems at the Ministry of Foreign Affairs of the Republic of Macedonia, while he currently serves as the Macedonian Ambassador to the International Organizations in Vienna (United Nations, OSCE, IAEA, UNIDO, etc.).

== Sources ==
- (in Macedonian) "Mizar - 20 years after" by Miodrag Mišolić at the Mizar Official Website
- (in Macedonian) Ministry of Foreign Affairs of Republic of Macedonia

== See also ==
- Anastasia
- Arhangel
- Afektiven Naboj
- Mizar (band)
- Music of North Macedonia
