= Belica, Makedonski Brod =

Belica Белица
- Village
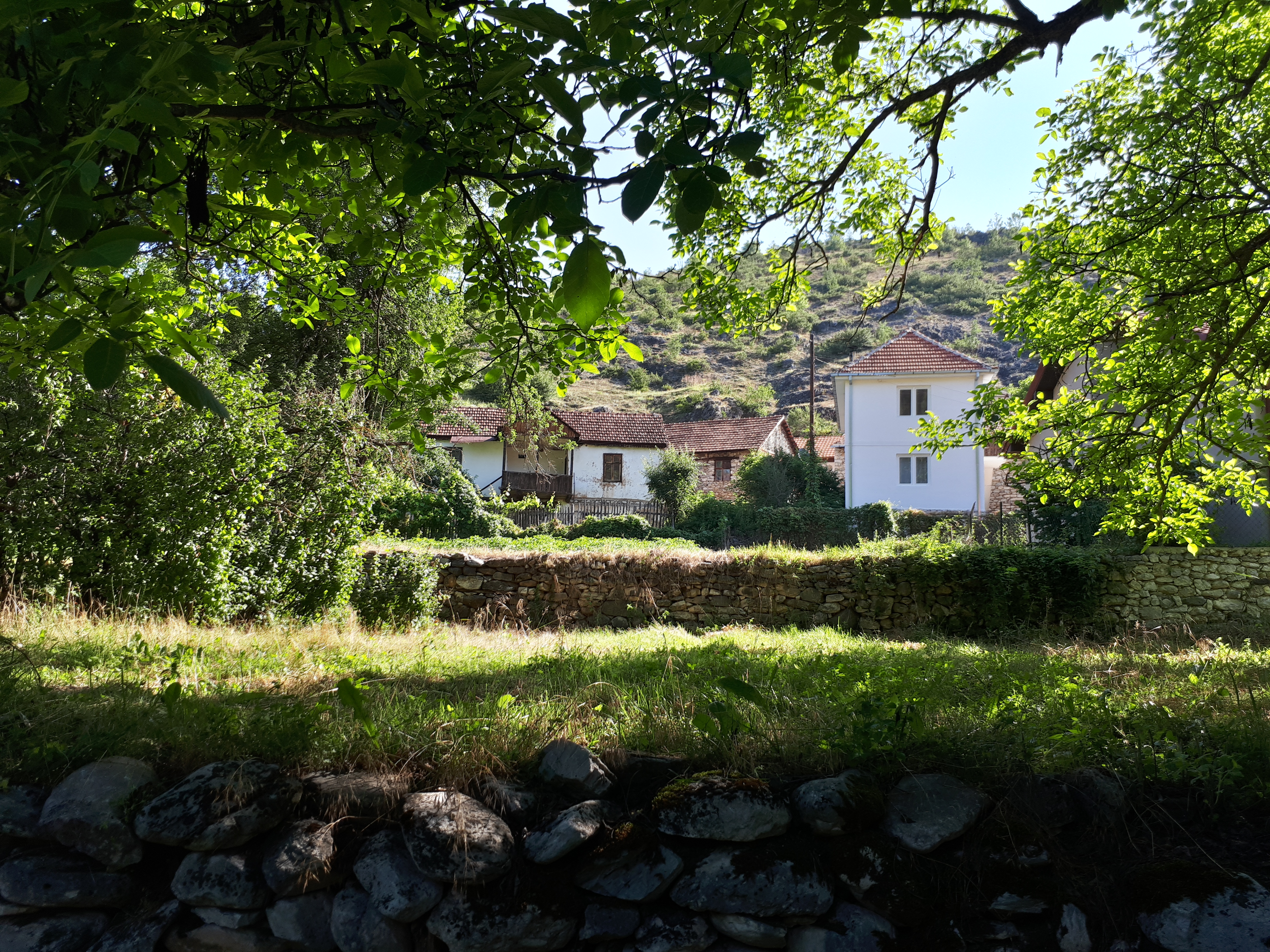

- Location within North Macedonia
- Coordinates: 41°40′N 21°18′E
- Country: North Macedonia
- Region: Southwestern
- Municipality: Makedonski Brod
- Elevation: 600 m (2,000 ft)

Population (2002)
  - Total: 106
- Time zone: UTC+1 (CET)
  - Summer (DST): UTC+2 (CEST)
- Website: http://belica.mk/

Belica (Macedonian: Белица) is a small village located in the region of Porece in the municipality of Makedonski Brod. It used to be part of the former municipality of Samokov.

It is situated at the foot of the Jakupica mountain range at an altitude of around 600 meters. Near the village are the sources of the Beleshnica river, one of the largest tributaries of the Treska river, which in turn flows into Lake Kozjak several kilometers downstream from their confluence. In the surrounding mountains three cave systems can be found: those of Momichak, Laparnica and Gulubarnica.

== Name ==
Concerning the name Belica, there exist two theories: One states that the name is derived from the clear white water of the Beleshnica river which springs near the village center. According to another theory, the village name is linked to the tragic legend of a local young girl, called Belaica, who threw herself from the rocks into the river after being forced to become the wife of a Turkish ruler.

== Geography ==
The village is located in the Poreče region, in the eastern part of the Makedonski Brod Municipality. The village is flat, at an altitude of 550 meters. It is 34 kilometers away from the town Makedonski Brod.

It is dominated by forests on an area of 3,029.8 hectares, followed by pastures on an area of 1,632 hectares, and arable land accounting for 145.4 hectares. The river Belica flows through the village, which is a tributary of the river Treska. The river is a protected natural monument. The village is divided into two parts: Dolna and Gorna Belica, which are further divided into several sub-districts.

== Demographics ==
According to the statistics of the ethnographer Vasil Kanchov ("Macedonia. Ethnography and Statistics") from 1900, the village of Dolna Belica had 26 inhabitants, and the village of Gorna Belica had 180 inhabitants, all of them were Bulgarians. According to the statistics of the secretary of the Bulgarian Exarchate, Dimitar Mishev ("La Macédoine et sa Population Chrétienne") in 1905, Belica had 320 inhabitants.

In 1961, Belica had 376 inhabitants, and in 1994 the number decreased to 146 inhabitants.

According to the 2002 census, the village had a total of 106 inhabitants. Ethnic groups in the village include:

- Macedonians 106
