= Kiril Parlichev =

Bulgarian revolutionary (1875–1944)

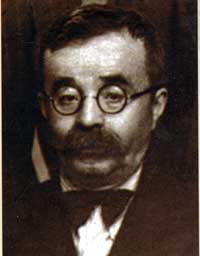
- Born: 1 March 1875; Ohrid, Manastir Vilayet, Ottoman Empire (today North Macedonia)
- Died: 9 February 1944 (aged 68); Ohrid, Kingdom of Bulgaria (today North Macedonia)

Kiril Parlichev (Bulgarian: Кирил Пърличев, Macedonian: Кирил Прличев; 1 March 1875 – 9 February 1944) was a Macedonian Bulgarian revolutionary and public figure. He was a member of Internal Macedono-Adrianopolean Revolutionary Organization (IMARO), teacher, journalist, translator and writer.

== Biography ==
Parlichev was born in Ohrid, Ottoman Empire in 1875. His father was the Bulgarian writer and educator Grigor Parlichev.

On 5 August 1898 Dimitar Grdanov, a Serbian teacher in Ohrid, and pro-Serbian activist in Macedonia was murdered by Metody Patchev, after which Patchev and his fellow conspirators Hristo Uzunov, Parlichev and Ivan Grupchev were arrested.

Parlichev later taught in the Bulgarian Men's High School of Thessaloniki, where he was accepted in IMARO. During the Ilinden-Preobrazhenie Uprising he was a member of the Hristo Chernopeev's band. After the end of the unsuccessful uprising, he started studying history in Sofia University. In the meantime he worked as a secretary of the IMARO committee in Sofia.

After the Young Turk Revolution, Parlichev participated in the inauguration of the Bulgarian Constitutional Clubs political party. He taught in Voden, where he and Hristo Zaneshev contributed to the activity of Bulgarian Constitutional Clubs.

In 1918 Parlichev wrote his first work - The Serbian Regime and the Revolutionary Struggle in Macedonia (in Bulgarian: Сръбският режим и революционната борба в Македония). He was also one of the founders of the Macedonian Scientific Institute in 1923. Parlichev translated into Bulgarian works of Karl Marx, Voltaire and others. After the murder of Todor Alexandrov, Parlichev was forced by Ivan Mihailov to stop his participation in the activities of IMRO. In the period 1941-1944, when the area was under Bulgarian control, he was director of the Historical Museum in Ohrid. He died there on 9 February 1944. Parlichev is survived today by his grandson, Kiril, who has published his previously unknown works in Sofia, Bulgaria.

== Works ==
- The Serbian Regime and the Revolutionary Struggle in Macedonia (1912 - 1915) (Bulgarian: Сръбският режим и революционната борба в Македония (1912 - 1915 година))
- Kyustendil Congress of IMRO from 1908. VEDA-MZH, Sofia 2001 (in Bulgarian: Кюстендилският конгрес на ВМРО 1908 г., издателство ВЕДА-МЖ, 2001, ISBN 954-8090-02-3
- 36 Years in the IMRO - Memories of Kiril Parlichev. VEDA-MZH, Sofia 2001. (in Bulgarian: 36 години във ВМРО - Спомени на Кирил Пърличев, издателство ВЕДА-МЖ, 1999, ISBN 954-8090-01-5
- Towards a Characterization of Grigor S. Parlichev ()Bulgarian: Към характеристика на Григор С. Пърличев), Macedonian Review 4 (2), pp. 99 - 140 (1928)

== Sources ==
- Cveta Trifonova, Danail Krapchev and the newspaper Zora (in Bulgarian)
- The Grandson of Our Famous Revolutionary Grigor Parlichev - Kiril Parlichev, (in Bulgarian)
- Toma Nikolov, Some Words For Kiril Parlichev, (in Bulgarian)
