= Raymond Detrez =

Belgian academic

Raymond Detrez (born 1948) is a professor of East European history and cultures and modern Greek history at the University of Ghent, Belgium.

== Biography ==
He has studied Eastern European languages and history at the University of Ghent (1967–71) and specialised in Bulgarian philology at the University of Sofia (1971). For around two decades, he worked as a producer of the Belgian Radio and then became a professor of Eastern European history and culture. In 1986, he received his Ph.D. with a thesis on the autobiography of Grigor Parlichev. Detrez has published books and articles on 19th and 20th century Balkan history, minority questions and nationalism. From 2000 until his retirement in 2013, he was a director of the Centre of Southeast European studies at the University of Ghent and also taught at the Catholic University of Leuven. Detrez was signatory of the Declaration on the Common Language of the Croats, Serbs, Bosniaks and Montenegrins. Detrez has conducted research mainly into three areas: historical approaches to pre-national collective identities on the Balkans; linguistic approaches to national identity on the Balkans and the image of Eastern Europe in the West and vice versa in literature and culture.

== Publications ==
- Burenruzie op de Balkan. Minderhedenproblemen in Zuidoost-Europa. Utrecht: Oost-Europa Projecten, 1988
- De Balkan. Van burenruzie tot burgeroorlog. Antwerpen: Hadewijch, 1992. ISBN 978-90-5240-107-2
- Grigor Părličev. Een case study in Balkan-nationalisme. Antwerpen: Restant, 19 (1992), nr. 2.
- De sloop van Joegoslavië. Het relaas van een boedelscheiding. Antwerpen: Hadewijch, 1996. ISBN 978-90-5240-350-2
- Historical Dictionary of the Republic of Bulgaria. Metuchen, N. J., & London: The Scarecrow Press, Inc., 1997. (2006) ISBN 978-0-8108-4901-3
- Kosovo. De uitgestelde oorlog. Antwerpen: Hadewych, 1998 (1999) ISBN 978-90-5240-495-0
- Bulgarije. Amsterdam: KIT, 2000. (2007) ISBN 978-0-8108-7202-8
- Криволици на мисълта. Прев. Жерминал Чивиков. София: ЛИК, 2001. ISBN 954-607-454-3
- Bulgarije: Mensen, Politiek, Economie, Cultuur, Milieu, 2000. ISBN 978-90-6832-378-8
- Macedonie: Mensen, Politiek, Economie, Cultuur, Milieu, 2001. ISBN 978-90-6832-385-6
- Macedonië - land in de wachtkamer. Antwerpen: Hadewych, 2002.
- Servie-Montenegro: Mensen, Politiek, Economie, Cultuur, Milieu. Koninklijk Instituut voor de Tropen, 2003. ISBN 978-90-6832-403-7
- Developing cultural identity in the Balkans: convergence vs divergence. Detrez, R. & Plas, P. (eds), Peter Lang, 2005. ISBN 978-082-046-660-6.
- Косово. Отложената независимост. Прев. Анета Данчева-Манолова. София: Кралица Маб, 2008. ISBN 978-954-533-078-0.
- Rusland een geschiedenis. Pandora Pockets, 2008. ISBN 978-908-918-002-5
- Europe and the Historical Legacies in the Balkans. Detrez, R. & B. Segaert (eds.) Brussels: P.I.E. Peter Lang, 2008. ISBN 978-905-201-374-9
- Centraal-Europa: een geschiedenis. Houtekiet, 2013. ISBN 978-908-924-225-9
- Не търсят гърци, а ромеи да бъдат. Православната културна общност в Османската империя. XV – ХІХ в., София: Кралица Маб, 2015. ISBN 978-954-533-146-6
