= Mizar (mountain) =

Mountain near Mount Hermon

Coordinates: 32°38′16″N 35°24′25″E

Mizar, also spelled Misar (Hebrew: מצער MiTs`aR), is a small mountain or hill near the more spectacular Mount Hermon. It is mentioned in Psalm 42, along with the peaks of Hermon, as being in the Land of the River Jordan.

== Location ==
Because there are, in fact, two Mount Hermons, the lesser-known one being the Hill of Moreh, in the Jezreel Valley, Mt. Mizar is probably the lower peak just east of this lesser-known Hermon, as the name of its adjacent city of Kafr Misr indicates.

== Translation ==
In the Septuagint and Vulgate versions, Mizar is translated as a common noun, "the small mountain" (i.e. ορους μικρου, monte modico). George Leo Haydock in his commentary on Psalm 41(42) associates it with the Temple Mount, which was physically unimpressive despite its spiritual import. The word means "distress, siege, siege works, fortification".
