= Arhangel =

Macedonian alternative rock band

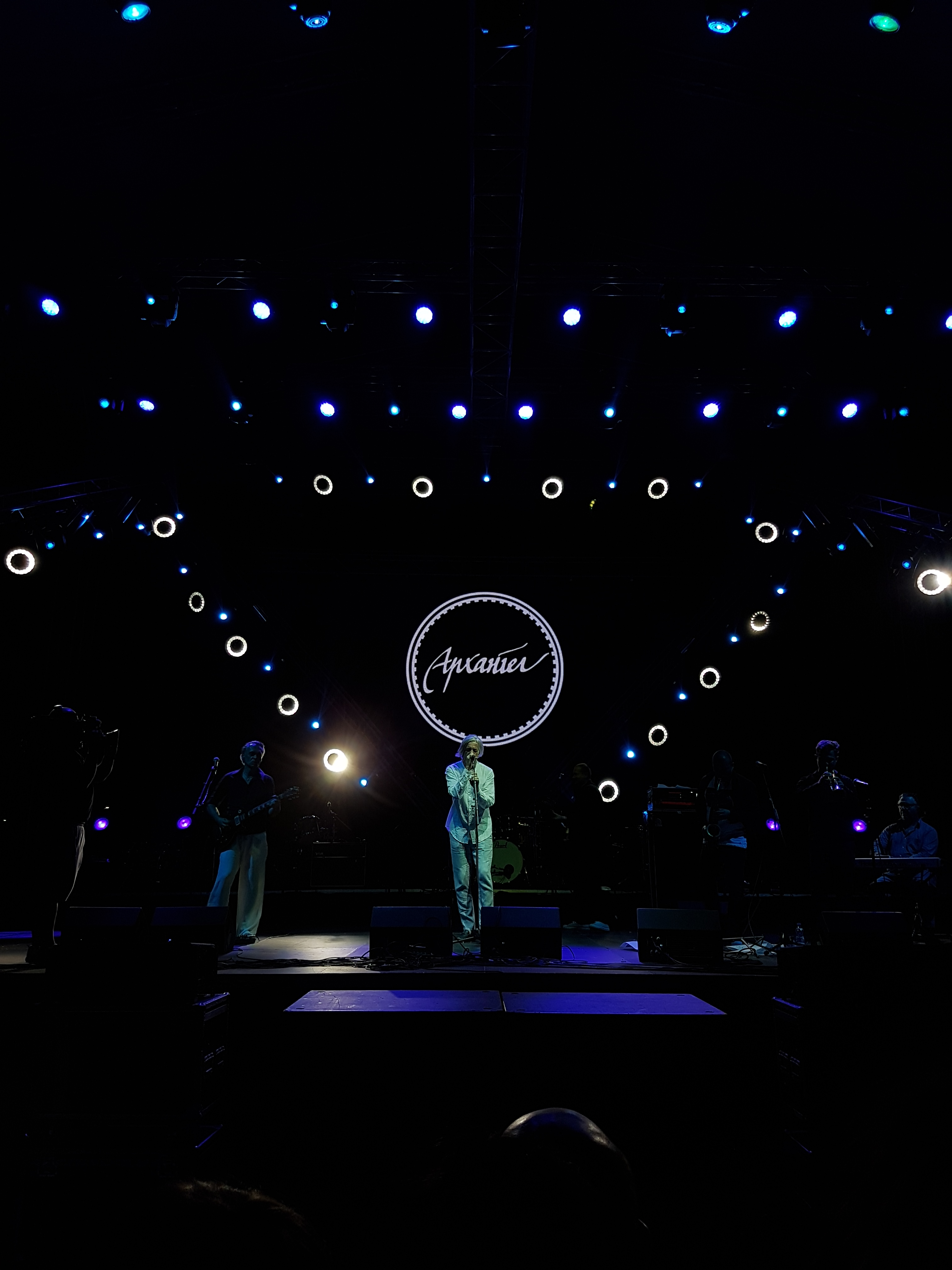
Arhangel

Arhangel (Macedonian: Архангел [arˈxaŋɡɛɫ], archangel) is a Macedonian alternative rock band formed in 1989. The frontman is Risto Vrtev who has also been part of such rock bands as Mizar and Inola X. The original line-up is: Risto Vrtev, Dragan Ginovski, Panta Džambazoski (drums) and Dejan Argirovski. Arhangel has released five albums (four studio and one live), which have been met with both critical and commercial success, being considered one of the best bands in Macedonia in the 1990s.

The band's sound is both muscular and melodic at the same time, echoing post-punk icons such as the English The Smiths and the Serbian Ekaterina Velika, while the band's lyrical inspirations focus is on the country's political and cultural changes during the 1990s. The band is also associated with the art movement Makedonska Streljba (Macedonian Barrage) during the 1980s and the 1990s.

The name "Arhangel" comes from a song written during frontman Vrtev's time in Mizar, which would later appear on the group's debut self-titled album. Other ex-Mizar songs used in Arhangel include "Isus" and "Dva vo eden".

== Discography ==
- Arhangel (1991)
- Arhangel 2 (1993)
- Heart Core (1998)
- Nebesna mašina (Heavenly Machine) (2003)
- Live in Skopje (2004)

== See also ==
- Music of Republic of Macedonia
- Anastasia
- Mizar
- Padot na Vizantija
- Yugoslav rock
