= Vale of Tears (novel) =

2004 novel by Peter T. King

Vale of Tears is the third novel by Peter T. King, a member of the Republican Party and the U.S. representative for New York's 2nd congressional district. Published in 2004, it is a thriller about a congressman, Sean Cross (who had first appeared as the protagonist of King's second novel, Deliver Us From Evil), who must thwart a planned “dirty bomb” attack by Qaeda operatives working in Brooklyn and on Long Island.

Some readers of the book noted the similarities and contrasts between King's earlier novels' treatment of Irish-American attitudes toward the Irish Republican Army, and his depiction of Arab-Americans in this one, in light of King's statement that his research for the book had led him to conclude that "85 percent" of American mosques had leaders involved in "terrorist activities". (In this book, King depicts a violent IRA splinter group that joining with Al Qaeda.)

Terry Golway of The New York Observer noted the connection between the novel and King's widely expressed criticisms of Muslims in the aftermath of the September 11 attacks. Noam Cohen of The New York Times called it a "barely veiled 2004 thriller" with a lead character, Rep. Sean Cross, standing in for the author. In The Nation, Michelle Goldberg called it "an execrable novel" but also "a fascinating book" given King's public positions.
