= Mizar (album) =

Studio album by Mizar
- Released: 1988
- Recorded: January–April 1988, Tivoli Studio, Ljubljana
- Genre: Darkwave; Gothic rock
- Length: 39:46 (original LP); 75:23 (Svedozhba); 57:09 (Lithium Records rerelease)
- Label: Helidon
- Producer: Goran Lisica - Fox

Mizar chronology
Mizar (1988)	Svjat Dreams 1762-1991 (1991)

Svedozhba
- Bootleg reissue of the album in 1997.

Mizar is the debut studio album by the rock band Mizar. It was released in 1988 on Helidon record label. This is the first major rock record in Macedonian.

In 1997, it was re-released as Svedozhba, on CD and cassette with bonus live and demo tracks. The versions of the album tracks on Svedozhba are taken from vinyl. Goran Tanevski was the only Mizar member involved with the project.

In 2003, the album was remastered and rereleased, containing live and demo tracks.

In 2024, the album was remastered and reissued on vinyl for the first time in 36 years. This reissue hit the top of the Croatian charts.

== Track listing ==
Original Album
No.	Title	Length
1.	"Devojka od bronza" (Bronze Maiden)	3:10
2.	"Doždot" (Rain)	3:26
3.	"Magla" (Fog)	2:55
4.	"Iljada i šeeset leta" (1060 Years)	3:47
5.	"Uninije" (Dullness)	2:41
6.	"Stoj" (Stop)	4:53
7.	"Gradot e nem" (The City is Silent)	5:57
8.	"Hoden že" (Walking (Macedonian recession of Church Slavonic)	3:39
9.	"Istekuvam" (Flow Out)	3:38
10.	"Zlatno sonce" (Golden Sun)	5:46

Svedožba Bonus Tracks
No.	Title	Length
11.	"Čifte čamče" (Two Dinghies (Macedonian чифте is from Turkish çift, meaning two))	5:38
12.	"Samo eden mig" (Just One Moment)	6:57
13.	"Svjat Dreams" (World Dreams, pun on Eurythmics - Sweet Dreams)	5:07
14.	"Veligden" (Easter)	2:58
15.	"1762"	4:24
16.	"Dumanje" (Thinking)	6:06
17.	"Abja mem"	4:23

Lithium Records Bonus Tracks
No.	Title	Length
11.	"Slavjani" (Slavs)	4:48
12.	"Dožd po doždot (demo)"	4:02
13.	"Doždot (live)"	3:33
14.	"Gradot e nem (demo)"	5:01

A music video was filmed for "Hoden že", showing the band playing the song in front of a church.

"Slavjani", "Dožd po doždot" and "Gradot e nem" are from a Mizar demo tape in 1988. "Doždot" was recorded live at the Kurshumli An in 1990.

On Svedožba, "Čifte čamče", "Samo eden mig" and "Veligden" are taken from the Kurshumli An concert in 1990 (a bootleg of the show that circulates among Macedonian music fans does not include "Samo eden mig"). "Svjat Dreams" is a darker sounding demo version of the final track, recorded in 1989. "1762", "Dumanje" and "Abja mem" are all taken from Svjat Dreams.

== Charts ==
Chart performance for Mizar
Chart (2024)	Peak position
Croatian International Albums (HDU)	1
