= Anastasia (band) =

Macedonian musical group

- Also known as: Apokrifna realnost, Aporea
- Origin: North Macedonia
- Genres: Electronic; Darkwave; progressive folk
- Years active: 1987–2002
- Members: Goran Trajkovski Klime Kovaceski Zlatko Oriǵanski Zoran Spasovski

Anastasia (Macedonian: Анастасија, romanized: Anastasija) was a Macedonian music group. The band was formed in 1987 as Apokrifna Realnost and changed their name to Anastasia in 1989. Their members are:

- Goran Trajkoski (ex Afektiven Naboj, Saraceni, Padot na Vizantija, Mizar, Aporea)
- Klime Kovaceski (ex Afektiven Naboj, Padot na Vizantija)
- Zlatko Origjanski (ex Lola V. Stain)
- Zoran Spasovski (ex Mizar, Aporea)

Their music is a blend combining Byzantine past, through Eastern Orthodox Church music with a rich gamut of ethnic Macedonian music rhythms.

Anastasia have written several music scores for films, theater performances and TV programs. Their soundtrack for the Academy Award-nominated movie Before the Rain was released in 1994 by Polygram and sold thousands of copies worldwide. In the same year, the Thessaloniki-based label Poeta Negra released a 12" EP containing the tracks "By the Rivers of Babylon" and "Pass Over." In 1997, they released "Melourgia" on the Greek label Libra (cat. no. L.M.007); the record included a reworked version of "By the Rivers of Babylon." This was followed by their last album to date, "Nocturnal," on the same label (cat.no. L.M.013); this record saw the band including electronic elements in their music as well.

== Discography ==
- Na rjekah vavilonskih (1988, self-released)
- Na rjekah vavilonskih (1990, DOM)
- Before the Rain (1994, PolyGram)
- Melourgia (1997, Libra Music)
- Nocturnal (1998, Third Ear Music)

== See also ==
- Goran Trajkovski
- Padot na Vizantija
- Mizar (band)
- Arhangel
- Music of North Macedonia
