= Samokov, Makedonski Brod =

Samokov Самоков
- Village
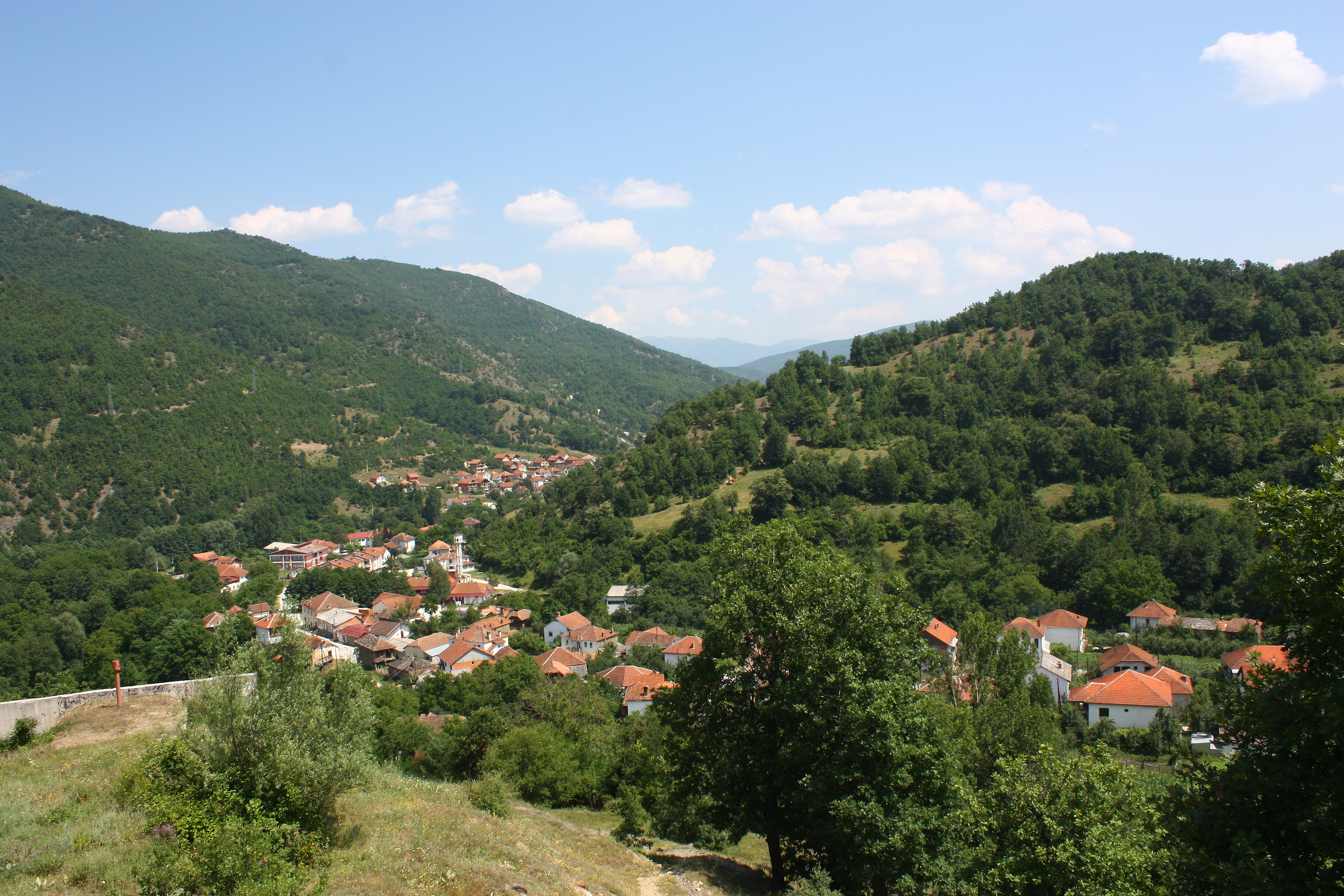
- View of the village Samokov

- Location within North Macedonia
- Country: North Macedonia
- Region: Southwestern
- Municipality: Makedonski Brod

Population (2002)
  - Total: 388
- Time zone: UTC+1 (CET)
  - Summer (DST): UTC+2 (CEST)

Samokov (Macedonian: Самоков) is a small village located in the region of Porece in the municipality of Makedonski Brod, North Macedonia. It used to be a municipality of its own and its FIPS code was MK89.

== Demographics ==
In statistics gathered by Vasil Kanchov in 1900, the village of Samokov was inhabited by 5 Muslim Albanians, among whom was the mudur of Poreče. According to the 1929 ethnographic map by Russian Slavist Afanasy Selishchev, Samokov was an Albanian village.

According to the 2002 census, the village had a total of 388 inhabitants. Ethnic groups in the village include:

- Macedonians 388
