= Folklore and Ethnography Collection =

Bulgarian publication

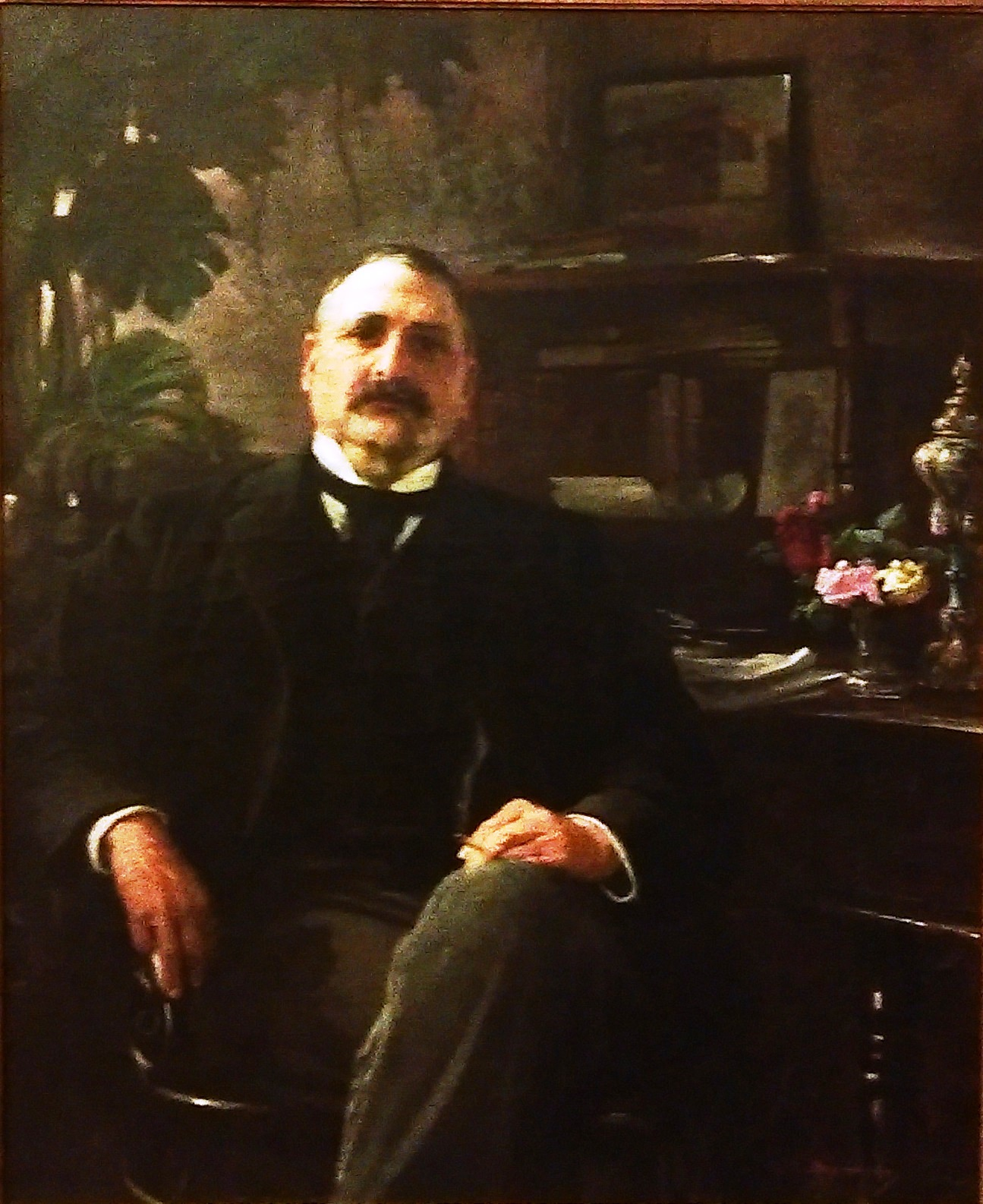
Ivan Shishmanov, portrait by Murkvichka.

The Folklore and Ethnography Collection (Bulgarian: Сборник за народни умотворения и народопис, Sbornik za narodni umotvoreniia i narodopis) is a serial publication covering various aspects of Bulgarian folklore and cultural anthropology. It has been published in Sofia since 1889; Volume 63 appeared in 2007, and Volume 64 appeared in 2012.

The title of this serial is commonly abbreviated as SbNU (СбНУ). It is fairly difficult to translate precisely, as the words "народни умотворения" literally mean "creations of the folk mind". The title has been translated into English in various ways, including Collection of folklore and folk studies, Collection of works of the popular spirit, etc.

This is a publication in which a great amount of Bulgarian (including from Macedonia, Bessarabia etc.) folk songs, tales, etc. have been first published.

== Not to confuse with ==
The Folklore and Ethnography Collection should be distinguished from another publication with a fairly similar name, the Bulgarian Folklore Collection(Bulgarian: Сборник от български народни умотворения, Sbornik ot bâlgarski narodni umotvoreniia). Edited by Kuzman Shapkarev, that collection, in several volumes, appeared in 1891.
