= Before the Rain (1994 film) =

1994 film by Milcho Manchevski

- Theatrical release poster
- Directed by: Milcho Manchevski
- Written by: Milcho Manchevski
- Produced by: Marc Baschet
- Starring: Katrin Cartlidge; Rade Serbedzija; Gregoire Colin; Labina Mitevska
- Cinematography: Manuel Teran
- Edited by: Nicolas Gaster
- Music by: Anastasia
- Distributed by: Vardar Film (North Macedonia); PolyGram Filmed Entertainment (International)
- Release date: 1 September 1994 (Venice)
- Running time: 113 minutes
- Country: North Macedonia
- Languages: Macedonian; English; Albanian

Before the Rain (Macedonian: Пред дождот, romanized: Pred doždot) is a 1994 Macedonian war film written and directed by Milcho Manchevski, starring Katrin Cartlidge, Rade Šerbedžija, Grégoire Colin and Labina Mitevska. Photographed by Manuel Teran, edited by Nicolas Guster, and featuring an original score by Macedonian band Anastasia, the film received critical acclaim. It was the first film made in North Macedonia following its independence.

== Plot ==
Before the Rain is a film told using a three part, cyclical structure.

In Part One, WORDS, a young Macedonian monk named Kiril, who has undertaken a vow of silence, finds an Albanian girl hiding in his room. Taking pity on her, he chooses not to tell his superiors and feeds her. She reveals her name is Zamira and calls him good, and though Kiril cannot understand Albanian, he smiles. The next day, Macedonian villagers are gathered near the monastery for a double funeral. Later, when a gang of these villagers comes looking for the girl, Kiril denies having seen her. The villagers insist on searching the monastery but do not find the girl. Later, Zamira is found by one of the other monks, and Kiril is thrown out of the monastery in the middle of the night, along with Zamira. Kiril's mentor sends him off with a slap to the face and wishes him luck. The two run off, with Kiril promising to care for Zamira and suggesting they run away to his brother nearby and then his uncle in London. The two are quickly intercepted by a group led by Zamira's grandfather. Zamira defends Kiril, saying he loves her, but her grandfather sends him away. When Zamira runs after Kiril, she is shot. Kiril goes to her side, and as she fades away, Zamira puts a finger to her lips.

In Part Two, FACES, a British photo editor at a London agency named Anne reviews photos before going to meet her mother for lunch. Her mother urges her to reconcile with her husband, Nick, when a man approaches Anne and kisses her. Anne introduces the man to her mother as Aleksandr Kirkhov, a Pulitzer Prize winning photographer. Later, when Anne and Aleksandr are alone, Aleksandr admits he resigned his job and that in his last job in Bosnia, he killed. He asks her to move to Macedonia with him. When she does not agree, he leaves. After Aleksandr leaves town, Anne has dinner with Nick and tells him that she is pregnant and wants a divorce. While they talk, an altercation develops between a drunken patron and a waiter (both Balkan men), which escalates into a shooting. Nick is killed, as well as the waiter and several bystanders.

In Part Three, PICTURES, Aleksandr returns to Macedonia. In his home village, those he passes by are suspicious of him. He returns to his former home to find it abandoned. He sleeps in the abandoned home and reunites with his relatives in the morning, who welcome him with a meal. The next day he goes to visit Hana, a widowed schoolmate of his. That night, in a letter to Anne, Aleksandr reveals that he told a militia man in Bosnia that he was not getting exciting photos so the militia man took out a prisoner and shot him. The next day, Aleksandr’s cousin is found dead. The villagers are sure the killer is “an Albanian whore” and proceed to collect their guns and seek revenge. Aleksandr tries to dissuade them but fails. That night, Hana pays Aleksandr a visit and asks him to help as though the girl were his own daughter. The next day, Aleksandr goes to retrieve the girl (Hana’s daughter) from where she is being held captive by the Macedonian villagers. They threaten to shoot him, and as Aleksandr walks away with the girl, they shoot him. The girl manages to escape and runs towards the monastery, where the first scene of the film is revisited.

== Cast ==
- Katrin Cartlidge as Anne
- Rade Šerbedžija as Aleksandar Kirkov
- Grégoire Colin as Kiril
- Labina Mitevska as Zamira
- Jay Villiers as Nick

== Production and release ==
The creation of the film served partly as a homecoming for Manchevski, who had lived in New York City since the 1980s. During the 1990s, Manchevski wrote a six-page outline for the film and managed to secure the support of the British Screen for the project. The British financial commitment was enhanced by French financing and support by the Macedonian ministry of culture. Shooting took place at a variety of locations across Macedonia in 1993. The film was initially not set in Macedonia. Manchevski had originally hoped to sidestep political specifics by setting the film in an anonymous country. Nicolas Gaster was the editor, and Manuel Teran was the cinematographer. The band Anastasia composed the film's soundtrack. The film was released in 1994 and widely distributed in the Western world. It was Manchevski's first feature film and was an international breakthrough for the Croatian actor Rade Šerbedžija.

The film's non-linear three-act structure was inspired by Aleksander Petrović's film Three (1965). The film also contains allusions to Sergei Eisenstein, Andrei Tarkovsky, and others. For example, the scene where Aleksandar whistles "Raindrops Keep Fallin' on My Head" while riding his bicycle is a conspicuous nod to Butch Cassidy and the Sundance Kid, directed by George Roy Hill.

== Themes ==
One of the main points of focus in the film is the ethnic clash that existed between Orthodox Macedonians and the Albanian Muslim minority in the early 1990s. It offers a view on how sociocultural norms and mechanisms can give rise to nationalism that grows into a phobia of the foreign. Additionally, through the character of Aleksandar, the film offers a view of the "cultural shock" and foreignness he experiences upon reintegrating and returning to his home country after being away.

== Critical reception ==
On review aggregator website Rotten Tomatoes, the film holds an approval rating of 92% based on 37 reviews. Deborah Young of Variety described the film as a "visually and narratively stunning tale." Film critic Roger Ebert described Before the Rain as one of the best films of the year and dubbed it "extraordinary". He further praised Manchevski's "clear, ironic, elliptic style" and called it "an art film about war, in which passions replace ideas". Criticism of the film largely focused on the gaze present in or allegedly constructed by the film. Slovenian philosopher Slavoj Žižek has interpreted the film as offering "to the Western gaze what it likes to see in the Balkans – a mythical spectacle of eternal, primordial passions, of a vicious cycle of hate and love, in contrast to the decadent and anemic life in the West."

== Awards and nominations ==
At the 67th Academy Awards that took place in 1995, the film was nominated in the category for Best Foreign Language Film, marking the Republic of Macedonia's first nomination ever in the award show. However, it lost to the film Burnt by the Sun by Nikita Mikhalkov. The film also won the Golden Lion at the 51st Venice International Film Festival, alongside Vive L'Amour by Tsai Ming-liang. It was also nominated for the Grand Prix in 1996 by the Belgian Syndicate of Cinema Critics. In addition to the aforementioned awards, the film also won 30 other awards.

Award	Category	Recipient	Result	Ref.
Academy Awards	Best Foreign Language Film	Before the Rain	Nominated	
Argentine Film Critics Association Awards	Best Foreign Film	Before the Rain	Won	
David di Donatello Awards	Special Award to a Non-Italian Film	Before the Rain	Won	
Independent Spirit Awards	Best Foreign Film	Before the Rain	Won	
Guldbagge Awards	Best Foreign Film	Before the Rain	Won	
Nastro d'Argento	Best Foreign Film	Before the Rain	Nominated	
Grand Prix 1996	Grand Prix	Before the Rain	Nominated	

== Legacy ==
The New York Times writers Vincent Canby and Janet Maslin included Before the Rain in their book The New York Times Guide to the Best 1000 Movies Ever Made published in 1999. The film has been part of the curricula at numerous universities and in the Italian and Turkish high schools. An interdisciplinary academic conference in Florence was dedicated to the film, and it has been the subject of numerous essays and books. Katarzyna Marciniak, a scholar from Ohio University, argued in her essay that the film, in addition to being a cautionary tale for people from the former Yugoslavia, also served as a message to Westerners and American citizens "to recognize the problematic 'doubleness' embedded in the concept of national identity".

== Home video releases ==
- 2008 The Criterion Collection, Region 1 DVD (Spine #436), June 24, 2008—Includes audio commentary by Milcho Manchevski and film scholar Annette Insdorf, an interview with Rade Serbedzija, a short 1993 documentary about the making of the film, and an essay by film scholar Ian Christie.
- It has also been released in Italy, Brazil, the UK, France, Turkey, North Macedonia, Japan, Argentina, and Mexico.

== See also ==
- List of submissions to the 67th Academy Awards for Best Foreign Language Film
- List of Macedonian submissions for the Academy Award for Best Foreign Language Film
