= Mizar (band) =

Macedonian rock band

Mizar Мизар
- Origin: Skopje, SR Macedonia, Yugoslavia (now North Macedonia)
- Genres: Dark folk, avant-garde, dark wave
- Years active: 1981–1983; 1985–1991; 2003–present
- Labels: Helidon; Avalon
- Members: Gorazd Čapovski; Zoran Origjanski; Pece Kitanoski
- Past members: Goran Trajkoski; Risto Vrtev; Boris Georgiev; Valentin Zabjakin; Panta Džambazoski; Goran Tanevski; Katerina Veljanovska; Eleonora Stojanović; Slobodan Stojkov; Ilija Stojanovski; Sašo Krstevski; Vencislav Smakjoski; Žarko Serafimovski; Vlatko Kaevski; Novogradska; Harmosini, (male byzantine choir)
- Website: www.mizar.com.mk

Mizar (Macedonian: Мизар [miˈzar]) is a Macedonian rock band from Skopje. They achieved a status of a cult band, especially in Macedonia and across the former Yugoslavian countries.

The group is notable for its first self-titled album, as it was the first popular music album in the former Yugoslavian countries in Macedonian. The album was a major success and it is listed among the top ten rock albums ever released in former Yugoslavian countries.

Mizar was formed in 1981 in the then Socialist Republic of Macedonia. Because of the band's avant-garde sound and image, its Christian leanings and support for Macedonian self-determination, they were viewed with certain degree of suspicion by the former authorities. Still, the group received great media attention including numerous appearances on the national television. The 2014 documentary Mizar: The Star of Hope details the band's origins.

== Name ==
The band got its name after Mizar which is a guiding star for the orientation of travelers in the deserts. The name was given by Panta Džambazoski.

== History ==
In their long history, Mizar has had 5 Revelations, all of them with different singers.

=== The First Revelation (Risto Vrtev) ===
Mizar were formed in 1981 in Skopje as an instrumental trio of Gorazd Čapovski on guitar, Valentin Zabjakin on bass and Panta Dzambazoski on drums. In late 1981, Zabjakin left the band and was replaced with Ilija Stojanovski. Risto Vrtev joined on vocals soon after. In 1982, the group recorded a demo tape for Radio Skopje. They then sent this tape to Jugoslovenski Rock Moment (also known as YURM), who wrote a short but glowing review of the tape. During 1983, the band then had to break up shortly after due to the members' mandatory army commitments.

=== The Second Revelation (Goran Tanevski) ===
In 1985, when the members of Mizar returned from army service, Čapovski attempted to form a band called Inola-X with Vrtev, but it did not work out. Mizar then reformed with Goran Tanevski-Stapot in place of Vrtev and a new keyboardist, Slobodan Stojkov. They started to use elements of the traditional Macedonian folklore and Byzantine music blended with post-punk, darkwave and gothic rock. This phase of Mizar is known as Мизар - Второ Откровение (Mizar - The Second Revelation). Vrtev later founded Arhangel (Archangel) which was awarded as the best rock act in Macedonia during the 1990s. Arhangel inherited certain features of Mizar but with a more conventional rock approach which is why Arhangel was sometimes referred as the Rock Mizar. In 1986, the band filmed a music video for the song "Stoj".

In 1986, the band played the Druga Godba festival in Ljubljana, but altercations within the band caused Dzambazoski and Stojkov to leave the group. They were replaced by Vencislav Smakjoski and Goran Trajkovski respectively. This lineup played at Festival Omladina, with Vladimir Kaevski on keyboards, and contributed two live tracks to the festival's compilation. These tracks are the first appearance of Mizar on record. Trajkovski would later be replaced by Sašo Krstevski, while Stojkov was replaced by Katerina Veljanovska.

In 1986 they recorded a few demos and were a support act for Laibach and Disciplina Kičme on their Yugoslav tour. In 1987 they were awarded for their unique sound at the most significant rock music festival which was held in Subotica.

They released their first, self-titled album, in 1988 with the following line-up:

- Goran Tanevski (vocal)
- Gorazd Čapovski (guitar)
- Boris Georgiev (drums) (ex. Badmingtons)
- Sašo Krstevski (bass)
- Katerina Veljanovska (keyboards)

The producer was Goran Lisica-Fox. Besides their own songs, the album also included a cover version of the notable Macedonian folk song Zajdi, Zajdi under the title "Златно сонце" (Golden Sun). One of the best-known songs from the album is "Девојка од Бронза" (Girl made of bronze).

By 1989, the lineup had stabilised to the following:

- Goran Tanevski - vocals
- Gorazd Čapovski - guitar
- Ilija Stojanovski - bass
- Žarko Serafimovski - drums
- Vladimir Kaevski - keyboards

This lineup's first appearance on record was the Demoskop 1 compilation in late 1990, where they contributed two tracks, "Veligden" and "Glas". Between October and December 1990, the band recorded their second album, Svjat Dreams, releasing it on 7 September 1991, the day before Macedonia split from Yugoslavia. The title of the record is inspired by the song "Sweet Dreams (Are Made of This)" by Eurythmics. On this album they covered the traditional song 1762 and a song written by Vrtev, the first singer of Mizar titled "Дом" (Home).

After the release of the band's second album Tanevski left the group and was replaced by the vocalist Nora. Soon by the end of 1991, the band split. Tanevski got involved in organising concerts, Kaevski restored his old band Kiborg, while Čapovski left for Australia. There he formed Kismet in 1993 which is considered a sort of continuation of Mizar's work because the musical style was similar. In 1999, Serafimovski and Tanevski reissued Mizar on CD under the title Svedožba, with bonus demo and live tracks, including a never-before-heard darker version of the song "Svjat Dreams" recorded in 1989 with Tanevski on all instruments and two unreleased live tracks, "Čifte Čamče" and "Samo eden mig". Also included were a live version of the Svjat Dreams album track "Veligden" and three tracks from Svjat Dreams 1762-1991. The live tracks were recorded at their Kuršumli An concert in 1990. In 1999, Čapovski returned to Macedonia and contributed two tracks to a tribute album dedicated to Mizar, which was released in 2001. In 2002, Kismet released an album called "Dreaming". The band broke up that year.

=== The Third Revelation (Goran Trajkoski) ===
In 2001 a tribute album named Tribute to Mizar was released. It was a collection of Mizar cover versions by some of the most notable groups in Macedonia incl. Majakovski, the black death metal band Syniac and others. Two years later the first two albums of Mizar were re-released on CD solely for the Macedonian market, but the record quickly spread across the countries of former Yugoslavia. Besides the albums, the CD also contained demos and live recordings.

Mizar was reunited in early 2003 with their former member Goran Trajkoski as a vocalist, with whom, first they released the single Macedonian: "Почесна Стрелба" (Gun Salute). That summer they played at the Exit festival in Novi Sad and in the alternative club Močvara in Zagreb. The entrance tickets included give-away records featuring the new single. The following year a new album titled Terrible Beauty (is born) came out. During 2005 Mizar toured ex-Yugoslavia, August 2005 Mizar toured Croatia together with Croatian gothic band from Zagreb - Phantasmagoria (Croatian band), with its leader Tomi Edvard Sega. That was Jadran Tour - Pula (Viva La Pola! festival), Zadar (Maya Pub), Split (O'Hara Club), Dubrovnik (Lazareti) and in the beginning of November they visited Serbia and Montenegro playing in Pančevo, Belgrade and Kragujevac.

=== After Trajkoski ===
During the summer of 2006 the former Mizar vocalist Goran Tanevski replaced Goran Trajkoski. In the beginning of November that year Mizar played in Belgrade and announced their new album featuring Tanevski as a vocalist. The album Pogled na cvetnata gradina was completed and released in 2007.

=== The Fourth Revelation (Harmosini) ===
In 2010, Tanevski left Mizar again and was replaced by the Byzantine choir Harmosini. The album Deteto i beloto more was released in 2010. The album contains a re-recording of "Hoden že" from Mizar's debut album.

In 2014, they were selected as the support band for Simple Minds' concert at the Kale hall in Skopje. Their new album, at the time entitled Šarena Krava (Coloured Cow), was announced at that concert. Šarena Krava returns the band to its punk rock roots, removing all traditional Macedonian instruments and patriotic lyrical themes. Harmosini has been replaced with Jana Burčeska, the second female singer in the history of Mizar since Nora Stojanovic's brief tenure with the band in 1991. One song intended for the album, "Nebo", was released on the Balkan Under the Radar vol. 2 compilation in 2014.

=== The Fifth Revelation ===
On 26 June 2015, the documentary Mizar: The Star of Hope was released, featuring interviews with members of early Mizar lineups and discussing a hitherto-unknown period in the life of the band; its beginnings in 1981 until 1986. Before the documentary, it was believed Mizar formed in 1983.

To this day, Čapovski has remained the only constant member of Mizar since its formation in 1981.

On 12 December 2022, Mizar's sixth album, by then retitled Večna praznina (Eternal Emptiness), was released.

== Musical style ==
Mizar's musical style is post-punk, darkwave and gothic rock. Besides influences such as Joy Division for instance, Mizar also uses elements of traditional Macedonian folklore and Byzantine music. Another main part of their music is Tanevski and Trajkoski's vocals, which are based on Christian church chants.

== Band members ==
=== Current band members (2014) ===
- Gorazd Čapovski (guitar)
- Zoran Origjanski (drums)
- Pece Kitanovski (bass guitar)
- Jana Burčeska (vocal)
- Vlatko Georgiev (keyboards)

=== Former band members ===
- Valentin Zabjakin (bass) 1981-1982
- Ilija Stojanovski (bass) 1982–1987, 1989-1991
- Boris Georgiev (drums) 1988-1989
- Žarko Serafimovski (drums) 1989-1991, 2003-2009
- Vladimir Kaevski (keyboards) 1987, 1989-1991
- Slobodan Stojkov (keyboards) 1985-1987
- Panta Džambazoski (drums) 1981-1986
- Risto Vrtev (vocal) 1982-1985
- Goran Trajkoski (bass) 1987 (vocal) 2003-2006
- Vencislav Smakjoski (drums) 1986-1988
- Sašo Krstevski (bass) 1988
- Novogradska (Backing vocalist) (bass) 2003-2006
- Harmosini (male Byzantine choir) 2009-2013
- Goran Tanevski (vocal) 1985–1991, 2006-2009
- Katerina Veljanovska (keyboards) 1987-1989
- Eleonora Stojanovic (vocal) 1991

== Discography ==
=== Albums ===
- 1988 - Mizar
- 1991 - Svjat Dreams (Light Dreams)
- 2004 - Kobna Ubavina Terrible Beauty (is born)
- 2007 - Pogled Kon Cvetnata Gradina (A View to the Flower Garden)
- 2010 - Deteto i Beloto More (The Child and the White Sea )
- 2022 - Večna Praznina (Eternal Emptiness)

=== Singles ===
- 2003 - "Juda"
- 2014 - "Nebo"
- 2015 - "Kajmos"

== See also ==
- Arhangel
- Anastasia
- Padot na Vizantija
- Goran Trajkoski
- Music of North Macedonia
