= Poreče =

Region in Macedonia

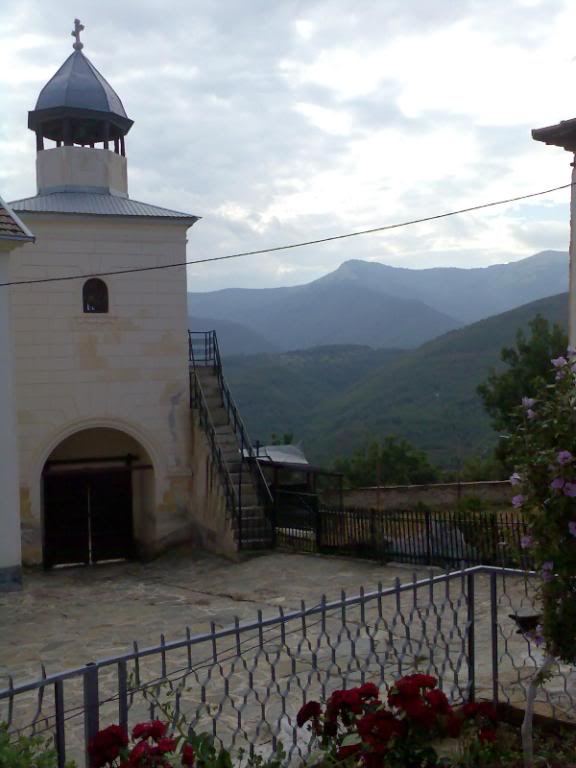
Monastery in Poreče

Poreče, Porečie or Porečje, or Poreč (Macedonian: Порече, Поречие or Поречје, or Пореч), is a region in North Macedonia which includes the Makedonski Brod Municipality, and the western part of the Prilep Municipality.
