= Macedonia in the Eurovision Song Contest 1998 =

- Eurovision Song Contest 1998
- Participating broadcaster: Macedonian Radio Television (MRT)
- Country: Macedonia
- Selection process: Skopje Fest 1998
- Selection date: 7 March 1998

Competing entry
- Song: "Ne zori, zoro"
- Artist: Vlado Janevski
- Songwriters: Grigor Koprov; Vlado Janevski

Placement
- Final result: 19th, 16 points

Participation chronology

Macedonia (Note: Officially under the provisional appellation "former Yugoslav Republic of Macedonia", abbreviated "FYR Macedonia".) was represented at the Eurovision Song Contest 1998 with the song "Ne zori, zoro" (Не зори, зоро), composed by Grigor Koprov, with lyrics by Vlado Janevski, and performed by Janevski himself. The Macedonian participating broadcaster, Macedonian Radio Television (MRT), selected its entry through Skopje Fest 1998. This was the first-ever entry from independent Macedonia in the Eurovision Song Contest, and the first-ever entry performed in Macedonian in the contest, after MRT was unable to debut in the 1996 contest by failing to pass the qualifying round.

== Before Eurovision ==
=== Skopje Fest 1998 ===
Macedonian Radio Television (MRT) held the national final on 7 March 1998 at the Universal Hall in Skopje accompanied by the big orchestra of MKRTV. Milanka Rašik and Aleksandar Delovski hosted the event, and the winner was selected by televoting.

Final – 7 March 1998
R/O	Artist	Song	Songwriter(s)	Televote	Place
1	Tanja Carovska	"Preku moreto" (Преку морето)	Tanja Carovska	1,339	12
2	Kaliopi	"Ne zaboravaj" (Не заборавај)	Kaliopi, Romeo Grill	3,834	9
3	Monika Sokolovska	"Son" (Сон)	Petar Georgiev-Kalica	862	15
4	Toše Proeski and Megatim Plus	"Ostani do kraj" (Остани до крај)	Kristijan Gabrovski, Hari Kotlarovski	4,210	8
5	Tanja, Lidija and Zorica Pančić	"Daj mi pričina da se razbudam" (Дај ми причина да се разбудам)	Zorica Pančić, Igor Cvetkovski	2,459	11
6	Sašo Gigov-Giš	"Samovilska svadba" (Самовилска свадба)	Jordan Danailovski, Grigor Koprov	34,774	2
7	Iskra Trpeva and Granit	"Ne baraj me" (Не барај ме)	Ljubomir Brangolica	681	20
8	Risto Samardžiev	"Ne veruvam" (Не верувам)	Risto Samardžiev	8,866	5
9	Dule and Koki	"Daj mi šansa" (Дај ми шанса)	Miodrag Vrčakovski, Grigor Koprov	23,615	3
10	Biljana Dodeva	"Koj si ti" (Кој си ти)	Liljana Vasileva, Biljana Dodeva	828	16
11	Pece Ognenov and Andrijana Janevska	"Te sakam beskrajno" (Те сакам бескрајно)	Adrijana Janevska	1,100	13
12	Duo Maratov	"Bez tebe" (Без тебе)	Blagoj Morotow	764	17
13	Intervali	"Ljubovta nema granici" (Љубовта нема граници)	Boris Gavrilovski	694	19
14	Maja Grozdanovska and Bumerang	"Kameleon" (Камелеон)	Metodi Ivanov	3,319	10
15	Marjan Nečak	"Andrea" (Андреа)	Marjan Nečak	725	18
16	Suzana Spasovska	"Opomena" (Опомена)	Boško Smakoski, Vančo Dimitrov	5,441	6
17	Maja Vukičević	"Broj do deset" (Број до десет)	Aleksandar Mitevski, Stefče Črčev	908	14
18	Vlado Janevski	"Ne zori, zoro" (Не зори, зоро)	Vlado Janevski, Grigor Koprov	38,642	1
19	Karolina Gočeva	"Ukradeni nokji" (Украдени ноќи)	Miodrag Vrčakovski, Kire Kostov	10,454	4
20	Mičo Atanasiu	"Pari pari" (Пари пари)	Vladimir Petrovski, Mičo Atanasiu	4,453	7

== At Eurovision ==
Vlado Janevski performed last in the running order on the night of the contest, following Turkey. "Ne zori, zoro" scored 16 points, finishing in 19th place out of 25 countries. Due to low placement Macedonia was relegated from the 1999 contest, but it would eventually return in 2000.

=== Voting ===
Points awarded to Macedonia
Score	Country
12 points	
10 points	
8 points	
7 points	
6 points	Croatia
5 points	
4 points	Slovenia
3 points	Romania; Slovakia
2 points	
1 point	

Points awarded by Macedonia
Score	Country
12 points	Croatia
10 points	United Kingdom
8 points	Israel
7 points	Ireland
6 points	Belgium
5 points	Turkey
4 points	Portugal
3 points	Netherlands
2 points	France
1 point	Finland
