= Robert Vukelić =

Macedonian pop singer

Robert Vukelić Роберт Вукелиќ
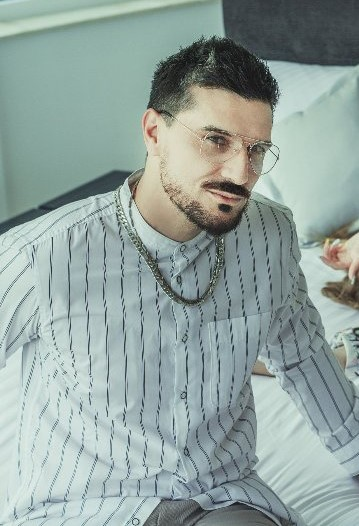
- Vukelić in his music video "Bezobrazno"

Background information
- Also known as: Wolf, Bocelli
- Born: 17 June 1986 (age 39); Skopje, SR Macedonia, SFR Yugoslavia
- Genres: Pop
- Occupation: Singer
- Instrument: Vocals
- Years active: 2007–present

Robert Vukelić (Macedonian: Роберт Вукелиќ; born 17 June 1986) is a Macedonian pop singer. He started his musical career in 2007. He has collaborated with several Macedonian composers, such as a Grigor Koprov, Risto Apostolov from Vodolija, Jovan Jovanov, Elvir Mekic, Hari Kotlaroski and Silvi Band.

== Biography ==
Robert Vukelić is one of the best vocalists in Macedonia. He was born on June 17, 1986, in Skopje, Macedonia.

He has his first contact with music in the fifth grade in the primary school. From the seventh grade there is a period when he moves away from music due to the loss of a loved one from the family, but for that period the love for music is even greater and grows even more and there comes a period when his wish and love is realized

He started his music career at the age of 21, with some previous musical experience. He appears on the Macedonian stage for the first time with the song "Ima nesto vo tebe" which in a very short period brought him success on radio stations and charts. With this song he won many female hearts and became a young hopeful singer.

Robert in 2008 continues with his second song with which he also receives an invitation to promote it in Croatia at a major event held every year in Rijeka and attended by the biggest stars from Croatia and abroad.The same year he participated in the Ohrid Festival with the song "Ti si mojot son", which placed in the finals and won 2nd place among 36 compositions, and was also rated among the best songs of the festival

During his career, in addition to being the author of his songs, Robert has been involved in humanitarian activities and work in the field of improvement and protection of young people in Macedonia. He has been named an honorary member of several projects for young people in the region

== Singles ==
- "Ima nesto vo tebe"
- "Boze vratija"
- "Pukni vo srce"
- "Ko magija"
- "Vjerujem u ljubav"
- "Vo sonista"
- "Eden ubav den"
- "Ti si mojot son"
- "Wolf & Deks - Bezobrazno"
- "Wolf - Vreme i Nevreme"

== Events and awards ==
- 2008– “Ohrid Fest” Ohridski Festival – Ohrid, Macedonia– 3rd place and best debut
- 2008- Award for Example and promoter for young children for the prevention of drug and alcohol in Macedonia
- 2009– 'Srebrena Jantra” – Veliko Trnovo, Bulgaria – 2nd place
- 2009- Award for humanity - of children with special needs SOS in Macedonia
- 2010 - Internacional Festival - Varna, Bulgaria – 2nd place Gramota
- 2010- Sofia Pee (European festival) - Sofia, Bulgaria - 2nd
