= Macedonia in the Eurovision Song Contest 2011 =

- Eurovision Song Contest 2011
- Participating broadcaster: Macedonian Radio Television (MRT)
- Country: Macedonia
- Selection process: Skopje Fest 2011
- Selection date: 27 February 2011

Competing entry
- Song: "Rusinka"
- Artist: Vlatko Ilievski
- Songwriters: Grigor Koprov; Jovan Jovanov; Vladimir Dojčinovski; Marko Marinković

Placement
- Semi-final result: Failed to qualify (16th)

Participation chronology

Macedonia (Note: Officially under the provisional appellation "former Yugoslav Republic of Macedonia", abbreviated "FYR Macedonia".) was represented at the Eurovision Song Contest 2011 with the song "Rusinka", written by Grigor Koprov, Jovan Jovanov, Vladimir Dojčinovski and Marko Marinković, and performed by Vlatko Ilievski. The Macedonian participating broadcaster, Macedonian Radio Television (MRT), organised Skopje Fest 2011 in order to select its entry for the contest. Twenty entries competed in the competition on 27 February 2011 where "Rusinka" performed by Vlatko Ilievski was selected following the combination of votes from a fifteen-member jury panel and a public televote.

Macedonia was drawn to compete in the second semi-final of the Eurovision Song Contest which took place on 12 May 2011. Performing during the show in position 11, "Rusinka" was not announced among the top 10 entries of the second semi-final and therefore did not qualify to compete in the final. It was later revealed that Macedonia placed sixteenth out of the 19 participating countries in the semi-final with 36 points.

== Background ==
Prior to the 2011 contest, Macedonia had participated in the Eurovision Song Contest ten times since its first entry in 1998. The nation's best result in the contest to this point was twelfth, which it achieved in 2006 with the song "Ninanajna" performed by Elena Risteska. Following the introduction of semi-finals for the 2004, Macedonia had featured in only four finals.

The Macedonian national broadcaster, Macedonian Radio Television (MRT), broadcasts the event within Macedonia and organises the selection process for the nation's entry. Macedonia had previously selected their entry for the Eurovision Song Contest through both national finals and internal selections. MRT confirmed their intentions to participate at the 2012 Eurovision Song Contest on 29 November 2010. Since 2008, Macedonia selected their entries using the national final Skopje Fest but failed to qualify to the final on every occasion. For 2011, the broadcaster again opted to select the Macedonian entry through Skopje Fest.

== Before Eurovision ==
=== Skopje Fest 2011 ===
Skopje Fest 2011 was a song contest organised by MRT that served as Macedonia's national final to select their entry for the Eurovision Song Contest 2011. Twenty entries participated in the competition which took place on 27 February 2011 at the Universal Hall in Skopje, hosted by Elena Miteva and Zoran Mircevski and was broadcast on MTV 1, MTV Sat and online via the official Eurovision Song Contest website eurovision.tv.

==== Competing entries ====
A submission period was opened for interested artists and composers to submit their songs between 29 November 2010 and 10 January 2011. MRT received 88 submissions at the closing of the deadline. The twenty selected competing songs were announced on 20 January 2011, while their artists were announced on 27 January 2011.

On 3 February 2011, MRT announced that "Vo mojot svet imaš dom", written by Grigor Koprov, Vladimir Dojcinovski and Borce Dimitrov and performed by Nade Talevska was withdrawn from the competition due to overseas arrangements of the artist and replaced with the song "Kukuriku" by Rok Agresori. "Neka e so pomin", written by Ljupčo Mirkovski and Ognen Nedelkovski and performed by Dule i Koki was also withdrawn after the artists stated that Skopje Fest is rigged. They were replaced with the song "Posledna pesna" by Amir Ibrahimovski and Art Sound.

Artist	Song	Songwriter(s)
Amir Ibrahimovski and Art Sound	"Posledna pesna" (Последна песна)	Jovan Vasilevski, Gligor Kodoski
Angelina Stojanoska	"Znaeš li" (Знаеш ли)	Daniel Mitrevski, Petar Dimitrovski, Irena Dimovska
Bobi Mojsovski	"Te krade toj" (Те краде тој)	Lazar Cvetkoski, Ognen Nedelkovski
Emilija Gievska feat. Andrej Miske	"Paranoja" (Параноја)	Boban Apostolov, Zoran Rudan
Filip Jordanovski	"Sekogaš nekoj povekje vredi" (Секогаш некој повеќе вреди)	Darko Tasev, Blaže Temelkov
Goran Kargov	"Lažes deka ne boli" (Лажеш дека не боли)	Hris Marin, Vladimir Dojčinovski, Petar Acev
Ile Spasov	"Tugja si" (Туѓа си)	Ile Spasov, Ognen Nedelkovski
Ivan Jovanov	"Kockar" (Коцкар)	Denis Hajdarević, Ivan Jovanov, Jovan Jovanov
Lidija Kočovska	"Božji pateki" (Божји патеки)	Aleksandar Čerkezi, Maja Pavlovska
Martin Srbinovski	"Ram tam tam" (Рам там там)	Martin Srbinovski, Goce Simonovski
Natalija Slaveva	"Ne mi trebaš" (Не ми требаш)	Stole Avramov, Zoran Aleksić, Daniel Bankov
Nataša Malinkova	"Greška" (Грешка)	Stole Avramov, Zoran Aleksić, Menče Avramova
Offside	"Sekoj den" (Секој ден)	Goce Simonovski, Milan Milanov
Olivera Gjorgovska	"Na kraj" (На крај)	Goce Simonovski, Rade Vrčakovski
Riste Tevdoski	"Ne se menuva ljubovta" (Не се менува љубовта)	Milan Milanov, Lazar Cvetkoski
Rok Agresori	"Kukuriku" (Кукурику)	Zoran Trikov, Aleksandar Ristovski-Prince, Zoran Trikov
Skipi and Tyzee	"Ostavi politika i pojačaj ton" (Остави политика и појачај тон)	Gorjan Jovanovski, Dragan Veličkovski
Vlatko Ilievski	"Rusinka" (Русинка)	Grigor Koprov, Vladimir Dojčinovski, Jovan Jovanov
Vodolija	"Ne vrakjaj se" (Не враќај се)	Risto Apostolov
Zdravka Mirčevska	"Ludost" (Лудост)	Zdravka Mirčevska, Kiril Babamov

==== Final ====
The final took place on 27 February 2011. The running order was determined through a draw held during the MRT programme Otvorenoto studio on 14 February 2011. Twenty entries competed and a 50/50 combination of public televoting and a fifteen-member jury panel selected "Rusinka" performed by Vlatko Ilievski as the winner. In addition to the performances of the competing entries, the competition featured guest performances by Dragan Mijalkovski, Superhiks, Femminem, who repsesented Bosnia and Herzegovina in 2005 and Croatia in 2010, Elena Risteska, who represented Macedonia in 2006, and Gjoko Taneski, who represented Macedonia in 2010.

Final – 27 February 2011
R/O	Artist	Song	Jury		Televote		Total	Place
R/O	Artist	Song	Votes	Points	Votes	Points	Total	Place
1	Rok Agresori	"Kukuriku"	327	0	54	0	0	15
2	Bobi Mojsovski	"Te krade toj"	508	0	936	7	7	7
3	Olivera Gjorgovska	"Na Kraj"	528	1	93	0	1	14
4	Angelina Stojanoska	"Znaeš li"	217	0	1,414	8	8	6
5	Skipi and Tyzee	"Ostavi politika i pojačaj ton"	457	0	64	0	0	15
6	Amir Ibrahimovski and Art Sound	"Posledna pesna"	530	2	133	4	6	10
7	Emilija Gievska feat. Andrej Miske	"Paranoja"	373	0	60	0	0	15
8	Riste Tevdoski	"Ne se menuva ljubovta"	511	0	86	0	0	15
9	Martin Srbinovski	"Ram tam tam"	595	8	181	5	13	2
10	Lidija Kočovska	"Božji pateki"	584	7	40	0	7	9
11	Goran Kargov	"Lažes deka ne boli"	531	3	82	0	3	13
12	Zdravka Mirčevska	"Ludost"	596	10	76	0	10	5
13	Nataša Malinkova	"Greška"	555	6	98	1	7	8
14	Ile Spasov	"Tugja si"	539	4	117	2	6	11
15	Filip Jordanovski	"Sekogaš nekoj povekje vredi"	475	0	127	3	3	12
16	Natalija Slaveva	"Ne mi trebaš"	390	0	1,699	10	10	4
17	Ivan Jovanov	"Kockar"	482	0	36	0	0	15
18	Offside	"Sekoj den"	540	5	212	6	11	3
19	Vlatko Ilievski	"Rusinka"	619	12	3,054	12	24	1
20	Vodolija	"Ne vrakjaj se"	383	0	61	0	0	15

=== Preparation ===
The new version of "Rusinka" was recorded in New York and mixed by American producer Cristian Varga. English, Serbo-Croatian and Russian versions of the song were also recorded along with the Macedonian version and released on 15 March. The official music video, directed by Bosko Stolic, was presented to the public on 17 March via the official Eurovision Song Contest website eurovision.tv.

=== Promotion ===
Vlatko Ilievski made several appearances across Europe to specifically promote "Rusinka" as the Macedonian Eurovision entry. On 8 April, Ilievski performed during the BHT 1 show Konačno petak in Bosnia and Herzegovina. On 9 April, Ilievski performed during the Eurovision in Concert event which was held at the Club Air venue in Amsterdam, Netherlands and hosted by Cornald Maas, Esther Hart and Sascha Korf. On 16 April, Ilievski took part in promotional activities in Belarus by giving interviews to media outlets and appearing during talk show programmes to discuss his Eurovision participation. Ilievski also completed a tour of the ex-Yugoslav region in Croatia, Slovenia and Bulgaria in late April.

== At Eurovision ==
All countries except the "Big Five" (France, Germany, Italy, Spain and the United Kingdom), and the host country, are required to qualify from one of two semi-finals in order to compete for the final; the top ten countries from each semi-final progress to the final. The European Broadcasting Union (EBU) split up the competing countries into six different pots based on voting patterns from previous contests, with countries with favourable voting histories put into the same pot. On 17 January 2011, a special allocation draw was held which placed each country into one of the two semi-finals, as well as which half of the show they would perform in. Macedonia was placed into the second semi-final, to be held on 12 May 2011, and was scheduled to perform in the second half of the show. The running order for the semi-finals was decided through another draw on 15 March 2011 and Macedonia was set to perform in position 11, following the entry from Bulgaria and before the entry from Israel.

The two semi-finals and final were broadcast in Macedonia on MTV 1 and MTV Sat with commentary by Eli Tanaskovska. The Macedonian spokesperson, who announced the Macedonian votes during the final, was Kristina Talevska.

=== Semi-final ===
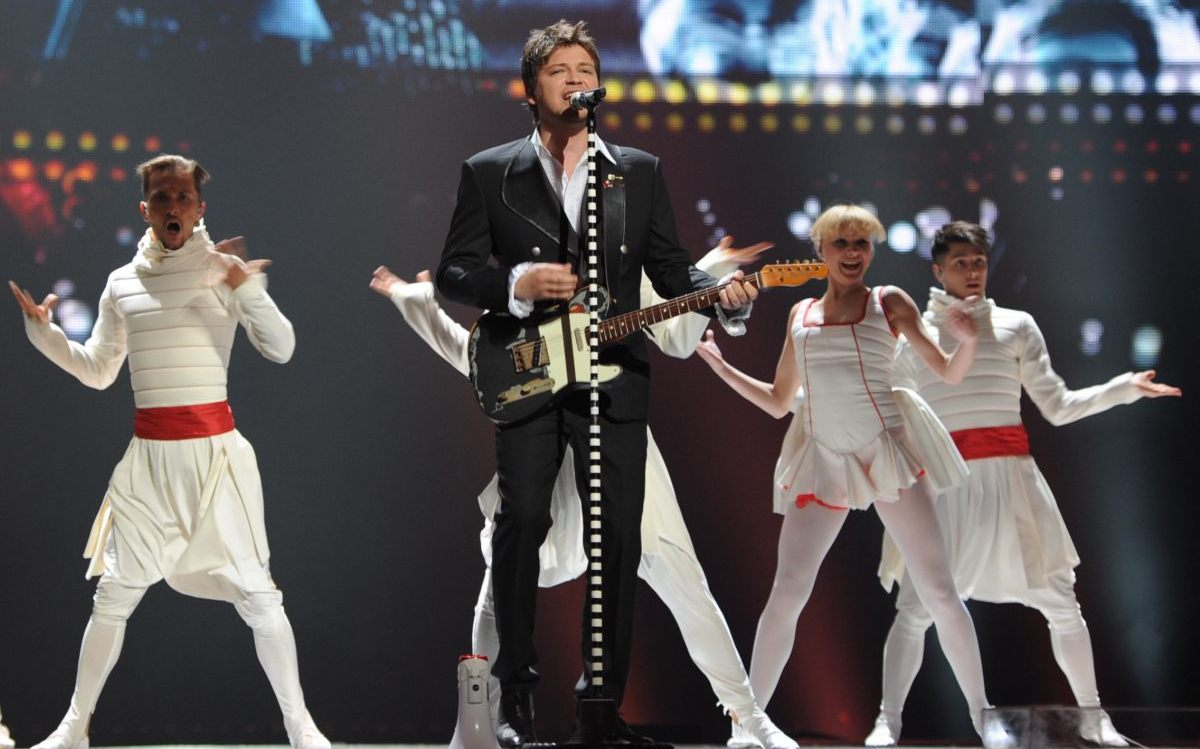
Vlatko Ilievski during a rehearsal before the second semi-final

Vlatko Ilievski took part in technical rehearsals on 4 and 7 May, followed by dress rehearsals on 11 and 12 May. This included the jury show on 11 May where the professional juries of each country watched and voted on the competing entries.

The Macedonian performance featured Vlatko Ilievski performing in a black suit together with five dancers. During the performance, one of the dancers played an accordion while Ilievski performed with a megaphone. The stage colours were predominately red with the background LED screens displaying the word "muzika" within a turning cube. The five dancers that joined Vlatko Ilievski on stage were Dardan Selmani, Ivan Angelkovski, Jana Andrejević, Ljupcho Atanasov and Marko Pešić.

At the end of the show, Macedonia was not announced among the top 10 entries in the second semi-final and therefore failed to qualify to compete in the final. It was later revealed that Macedonia placed sixteenth in the semi-final, receiving a total of 36 points.

=== Voting ===
Voting during the three shows consisted of 50 percent public televoting and 50 percent from a jury deliberation. The jury consisted of five music industry professionals who were citizens of the country they represent. This jury was asked to judge each contestant based on: vocal capacity; the stage performance; the song's composition and originality; and the overall impression by the act. In addition, no member of a national jury could be related in any way to any of the competing acts in such a way that they cannot vote impartially and independently.

Following the release of the full split voting by the EBU after the conclusion of the competition, it was revealed that Macedonia had placed seventeenth with the public televote and fourteenth with the jury vote in the second semi-final. In the public vote, Macedonia scored 33 points, while with the jury vote, Macedonia scored 47 points.

Below is a breakdown of points awarded to Macedonia and awarded by Macedonia in the second semi-final and grand final of the contest. The nation awarded its 12 points to Bosnia and Herzegovina in the semi-final and the final of the contest.

==== Points awarded to Macedonia ====
Points awarded to Macedonia (Semi-final 2)
Score	Country
12 points	
10 points	Bosnia and Herzegovina
8 points	Slovenia
7 points	Belarus; Ukraine
6 points	
5 points	
4 points	
3 points	Israel
2 points	
1 point	Moldova

==== Points awarded by Macedonia ====
Points awarded by Macedonia (Semi-final 2)
Score	Country
12 points	Bosnia and Herzegovina
10 points	Slovenia
8 points	Belarus
7 points	Israel
6 points	Ukraine
5 points	Moldova
4 points	Romania
3 points	Slovakia
2 points	Sweden
1 point	Bulgaria

Points awarded by Macedonia (Final)
Score	Country
12 points	Bosnia and Herzegovina
10 points	Slovenia
8 points	Serbia
7 points	Ukraine
6 points	Sweden
5 points	United Kingdom
4 points	Spain
3 points	Greece
2 points	Austria
1 point	Italy
