= Macedonia in the Eurovision Song Contest 2009 =

- Eurovision Song Contest 2009
- Participating broadcaster: Macedonian Radio Television (MRT)
- Country: Macedonia
- Selection process: Skopje Fest 2009
- Selection date: 21 February 2009

Competing entry
- Song: "Nešto što kje ostane"
- Artist: Next Time
- Songwriters: Jovan Jovanov; Damjan Lazarov; Elvir Mekić

Placement
- Semi-final result: Failed to qualify (10th)

Participation chronology

Macedonia (Note: Officially under the provisional appellation "former Yugoslav Republic of Macedonia", abbreviated "FYR Macedonia".) was represented at the Eurovision Song Contest 2009 with the song "Nešto što kje ostane" (Нешто што ќе остане), written by Jovan Jovanov, Damjan Lazarov, and Elvir Mekić, and performed by the duo Next Time. The Macedonian participating broadcaster, Macedonian Radio Television (MRT), organised Skopje Fest 2009 in order to select its entry for the contest. 32 entries competed in the competition which consisted of three shows: two semi-finals and a final. Sixteen songs competed in each semi-final and the top eight from each semi-final qualified to the final. In the final, "Nešto što kje ostane" performed by Next Time was selected following the combination of votes from a twelve-member jury panel and a public televote.

Macedonia was drawn to compete in the first semi-final of the Eurovision Song Contest which took place on 12 May 2009. Performing during the show in position 13, "Nešto što kje ostane" was not announced among the 10 qualifying entries of the first semi-final and therefore did not qualify to compete in the final. It was later revealed that Macedonia placed tenth out of the 18 participating countries in the semi-final with 45 points.

== Background ==
Prior to the 2009 contest, Macedonian Radio Television (MRT) had participated in the Eurovision Song Contest representing Macedonia eight times since its first entry in 1998. Its best result in the contest to this point was twelfth, achieved in 2006 with the song "Ninanajna" performed by Elena Risteska. Following the introduction of semi-finals for the 2004, Macedonia had featured in four finals.

As part of its duties as participating broadcaster, MRT organises the selection of its entry in the Eurovision Song Contest and broadcasts the event in the country. The broadcaster had previously selected its entry for the contest through both national finals and internal selections. Despite rumours of a withdrawal due to financial difficulties which could have ended in bankruptcy or liquidation of MRT, the broadcaster confirmed its intentions to participate at the 2009 contest on 6 November 2008 and held weekly debate programs to as a platform for discussion on how the selection process for the Macedonian entry can be fair and successful. In 2008, MRT selected its entry using the national final Skopje Fest but failed to qualify to the final. For 2009, the broadcaster again opted to select the Macedonian entry through Skopje Fest.

== Before Eurovision ==
=== Skopje Fest 2009 ===
Skopje Fest 2009 was a song contest organised by MRT that served as a national final to select its entry for the Eurovision Song Contest 2009. Thirty-two entries participated in the competition which consisted of two semi-finals on 18 and 19 February 2009 leading to a sixteen-song final on 20 February 2009. All three shows took place at the Universal Hall in Skopje, hosted by Zoran Ljutkov and Biljana Gjorgjiovska and were broadcast on MTV 1, MTV Sat and Macedonian Radio.

==== Format ====
The format of the competition included two semi-finals on 19 and 20 February 2009 and a final on 21 February 2009. Sixteen songs competed in each semi-final and the top eight from each semi-final qualified to complete the sixteen song lineup in the final. The results of the semi-finals and the final were determined by the 50/50 combination of votes from an expert jury panel and public televoting. The public could vote through telephone and SMS.

==== Competing entries ====
A submission period was opened for interested artists and composers to submit their entries between 26 November 2008 and 25 December 2008. MRT received 142 submissions at the closing of the deadline and thirty-two entries were selected by a six-member committee consisting of Gordana Andrashevska (MTV), Ljupčo Mirkovski (artistic director of Skopje Fest), Meri Popova (MTV), Radica Mitić (MR 2), Ariton Krliu (MR 2) and Danail Darkovski (composer and instrumentalist). The thirty-two competing songs were announced on 6 January 2009, while their artists were announced on 15 January 2009. On 23 January 2009, MRT announced that "Ti peam pesna", written by Kire Kostov and performed by Aleksandar Belov was withdrawn from the competition and replaced with the song "Isto što i ti" by Treta dimenzija, while Stefan Cvetkovski would replace Naum Petreski as the performer of the song "Zemi se".

Artist	Song	Songwriter(s)
Aleksandar Belov	"Zastani, solzi izbriši" (Застани, солзи избриши)	Grigor Koprov
Amir Ibraimovski	"Otvori go srceto" (Отвори го срцето)	Jovan Vasilevski
Ana Simonovska	"Dobar kraj" (Добар краj)	Ana Simonovska
Andrijana Janevska	"Drvo bez koren" (Дрво без корен)	Andrijana Janevska
Bravo Band	"Devojko" (Девоjко)	Simon Trpčeski, Jovan Trpčeski
Daniel	"Sila na ljubovta" (Сила на љубовта)	Aleksandar Masevski
Dejan Trifunovski	"Ljubovta doagja" (Љубовта доаѓа)	Lazar Cvetkovski, Milan Milanov
Dimitar Andonovski	"Me pronajde ti" (Ме пронаjде ти)	Hari Kotlarovski
Emilija Gievska	"Patuvam niz vremeto" (Патувам низ времето)	Zoran Ilievski
Filip Jordanovski	"Volšebnik" (Волшебник)	Blaže Temelkov
Jane Dulimaglovski	"Gledaš, ne sum sam" (Гледаш, не сум сам)	Vladimir Dojčinovski
Jasmina Dimitrovska	"Na moe mesto" (На мое место)	Bojan Gjoševski
Kostadin Papa	"Za nea postojam" (За неа постоjам)	Kostadin Papa
Kristijan Jovanov	"Nema da zboram" (Нема да зборам)	Vančo Dimitrov
Lili	"Za kraj" (За краj)	Davor Jordanovski
Nade Talevska	"Dali misliš na nas" (Дали мислиш на нас)	Goce Simonovski
Naum Petreski and Kaliopi	"Rum Dum Dum" (Рум Дум Дум)	Kire Kostov, Miodrag Vrčakovski
Next Time	"Nešto što kje ostane" (Нешто што ќе остане)	Damjan Lazarov, Jovan Jovanov, Elvir Mekić
Pampersi	"Zboguvanje" (Збогување)	Daniel Mitrevski
Patnici and Dijana Trajkoski	"Nasmej se" (Насмеj се)	Zdravka Mirčevska
Proekt Makedonija	"Pomalku naivno" (Помалку наивно)	Nikola Perevski, Vladimir Krstevski
Risto Samardžiev and Zoran Džorlev	"103 beli lebedi" (103 бели лебеди)	Grigor Koprov, Risto Samardžiev
Rok Agresori	"Ding Dong" (Динг Донг)	Zoran Trpkov
Sleng	"Gengsta oro" (Генгста оро)	Daniel Joveski
Stefan Cvetkovski	"Zemi se" (Земи се)	Ljupčo Trajkovski
Treta dimenzija	"Isto što i ti" (Исто што и ти)	Duško Temelkovski
Venera	"Povtorno ljubena" (Повторно љубена)	Stevče Grozdanov
Verica Pandilovska	"Severno od mene, južno od tebe" (Северно од мене, jужно од тебе)	Kaliopi Bukle
Vlatko Ilievski	"Najbogat na svet" (Наjбогат на свет)	Vladimir Dojčinovski, Vesna Malinova
Vlatko Lozanoski	"Blisku do mene" (Блиску до мене)	Lazar Cvetkovski, Darko Dimitrov
Vodolija	"Mojot TV" (Моjот ТВ)	Risto Apostolov
Žarmena	"Igra so nas" (Игра со нас)	Dimče Kitrozoski

==== Semi-finals ====
The two semi-finals took place on 19 and 20 February 2009. Sixteen entries competed in each semi-final and top eight entries qualified to the final by a 50/50 combination of public televoting and a twelve-member jury panel. In addition to the performances of the competing entries, the first semi-final featured a guest performance by 2005 Macedonian Eurovision representative Martin Vučić, while the second semi-final featured guest performances by DJ Pancho, Rebis and participants of the project Kirilitso ispeana.

Semi-final 1 – 19 February 2009
R/O	Artist	Song	Jury	Televote	Total	Place
1	Kostadin Papa	"Za nea postojam"	0	8	8	6
2	Ana Simonovska	"Dobar kraj"	4	0	4	10
3	Andrijana Janevska	"Drvo bez koren"	8	0	8	6
4	Treta dimenzija	"Isto što i ti"	0	3	3	12
5	Vodolija	"Mojot TV"	0	1	1	13
6	Verica Pandilovska	"Severno od mene, južno od tebe"	6	0	6	8
7	Dimitar Andonovski	"Me pronajde ti"	1	4	5	9
8	Risto Samardžiev and Zoran Džorlev	"103 beli lebedi"	12	7	19	2
9	Lili	"Za kraj"	0	0	0	14
10	Žarmena	"Igra so nas"	0	0	0	14
11	Sleng	"Gengsta oro"	5	10	15	3
12	Emilija Gievska	"Patuvam niz vremeto"	0	0	0	14
13	Proekt Makedonija	"Pomalku naivno"	7	5	12	4
14	Daniel	"Sila na ljubovta"	3	6	9	5
15	Next Time	"Nešto što kje ostane"	10	12	22	1
16	Jane Dulimaglovski	"Gledaš, ne sum sam"	2	2	4	10

Semi-final 2 – 20 February 2009
R/O	Artist	Song	Jury	Televote	Total	Place
1	Dejan Trifunovski	"Ljubovta doagja"	0	5	5	8
2	Stefan Cvetkovski	"Zemi se"	0	1	1	12
3	Jasmina Dimitrovska	"Na moe mesto"	2	0	2	11
4	Filip Jordanovski	"Volšebnik"	0	0	0	13
5	Vlatko Ilievski	"Najbogat na svet"	7	6	13	5
6	Venera	"Povtorno ljubena"	0	0	0	14
7	Patnici and Dijana Trajkoski	"Nasmej se"	1	2	3	10
8	Aleksandar Belov	"Zastani, solzi izbriši"	5	10	15	3
9	Naum Petreski and Kaliopi	"Rum Dum Dum"	12	12	24	1
10	Amir Ibraimovski	"Otvori go srceto"	0	0	0	15
11	Bravo Band	"Devojko"	8	7	15	4
12	Vlatko Lozanoski	"Blisku do mene"	10	8	18	2
13	Pampersi	"Zboguvanje"	0	0	0	16
14	Rok Agresori	"Ding Dong"	3	4	7	7
15	Nade Talevska	"Dali misliš na nas"	4	0	4	9
16	Kristijan Jovanov	"Nema da zboram"	6	3	9	6

==== Final ====
The final took place on 21 February 2009. Sixteen entries competed and a 50/50 combination of public televoting and a twelve-member jury panel selected "Nešto što kje ostane" performed by Next Time as the winner. In addition to the performances of the competing entries, the competition featured guest performances by 2006 Macedonian Eurovision representative Elena Risteska, 2009 Belarusian Eurovision representative Petr Elfimov, 2009 Montenegrin Eurovision representative Andrea Demirović and 2009 Bosnian Eurovision representative Regina.

Final – 21 February 2009
R/O	Artist	Song	Jury	Televote		Total	Place
R/O	Artist	Song	Jury	Votes	Points	Total	Place
1	Vlatko Ilievski	"Najbogat na svet"	4	1,608	4	8	6
2	Dejan Trifunovski	"Ljubovta doaga"	0	537	0	0	14
3	Risto Samardžiev and Zoran Džorlev	"103 beli lebedi"	10	3,151	7	17	3
4	Bravo Band	"Devojko"	0	1,011	3	3	10
5	Aleksandar Belov	"Zastani, solzi izbriši"	1	2,595	5	6	7
6	Next Time	"Nešto što kje ostane"	7	4,176	12	19	1
7	Rok Agresori	"Ding Dong"	0	985	2	2	11
8	Verica Pandilovska	"Severno od mene, južno od tebe"	0	108	0	0	14
9	Daniel	"Sila na ljubovta"	5	528	0	5	9
10	Proekt Makedonija	"Pomalku naivno"	0	972	1	1	13
11	Naum Petreski and Kaliopi	"Rum Dum Dum"	12	3,055	6	18	2
12	Kostadin Papa	"Za nea postojam"	0	738	0	0	14
13	Vlatko Lozanoski	"Blisku do mene"	8	3,402	8	16	4
14	Andrijana Janevska	"Drvo bez koren"	6	218	0	6	8
15	Sleng	"Gengsta oro"	3	4,168	10	13	5
16	Kristijan Jovanov	"Nema da zboram"	2	621	0	2	12

=== Promotion ===
Next Time made several appearances across Europe to specifically promote "Nešto što kje ostane" as the Macedonian Eurovision entry. On 1 March, Next Time performed "Nešto što kje ostane" during the presentation show of the 2009 Bosnian Eurovision entry, BH Eurosong Show 2009. Next Time also performed the song during the semi-final of the Serbian Eurovision national final Beovizija 2009 on 7 March.

== At Eurovision ==
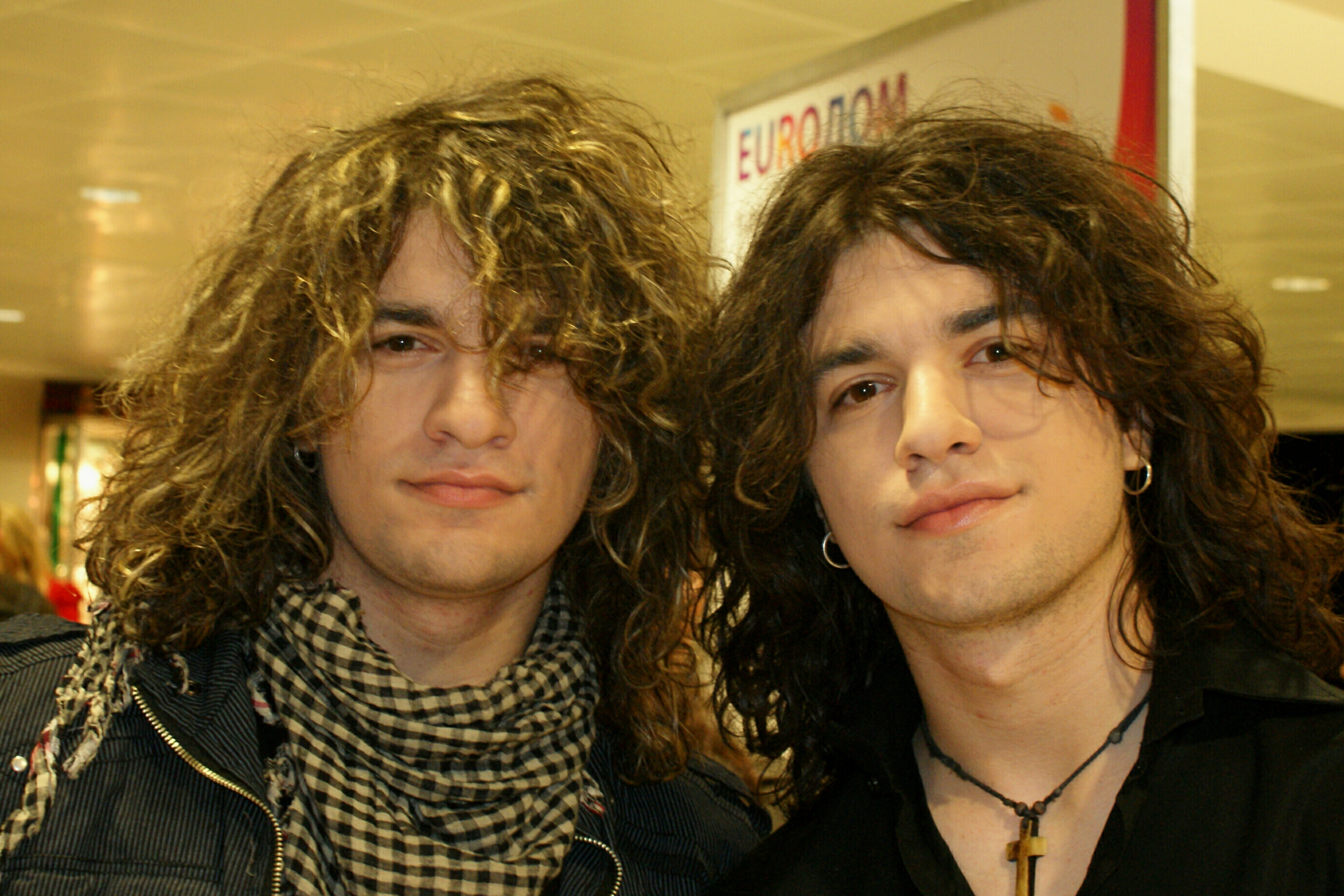
Next Time at the Eurovision Song Contest 2009

According to Eurovision rules, all nations with the exceptions of the host country and the "Big Four" (France, Germany, Spain and the United Kingdom) are required to qualify from one of two semi-finals in order to compete for the final; the top nine songs from each semi-final as determined by televoting progress to the final, and a tenth was determined by back-up juries. The European Broadcasting Union (EBU) split up the competing countries into six different pots based on voting patterns from previous contests, with countries with favourable voting histories put into the same pot. On 30 January 2009, a special allocation draw was held which placed each country into one of the two semi-finals. Macedonia was placed into the first semi-final, to be held on 12 May 2009. The running order for the semi-finals was decided through another draw on 16 March 2009 and Macedonia was set to perform in position 13, following the entry from Iceland and before the entry from Romania.

The two semi-finals and final were broadcast in Macedonia on MTV 1 and MTV Sat with commentary by Karolina Petkovska and Aleksandra Jovanovska. The Macedonian spokesperson, who announced the Macedonian votes during the final, was Frosina Josifovska.

=== Semi-final ===
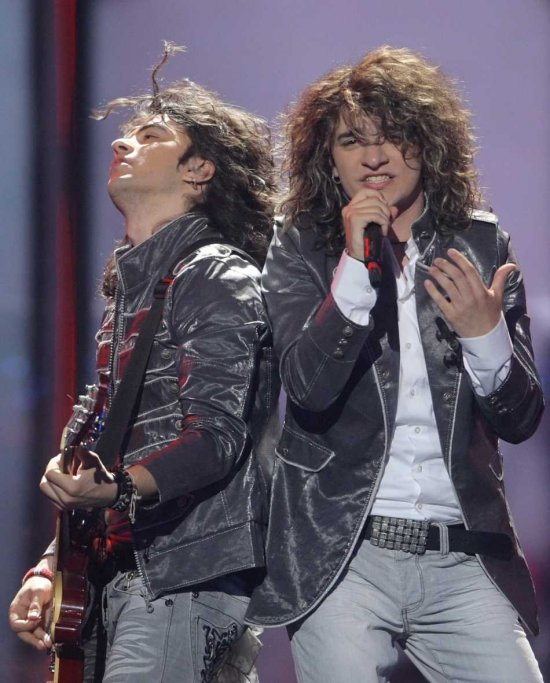
Next Time performing during the first semi-final

Next Time took part in technical rehearsals on 4 and 7 May, followed by dress rehearsals on 11 and 12 May. The Macedonian performance featured the members of Next Time performing together with two guitarists and two drummers. The background LED screens displayed metallic elements and glass patterns with single white flashing lights being used on stage. The performance also featured several effects including fire and silver pyrotechnics. The four musicians that joined Next Time on stage were the co-composer of "Nešto što kje ostane" Damjan Lazarov, Goran Mihajlovski, Maja Balevska and Mario Stanković.

At the end of the show, Macedonia was not announced among the 10 qualifying entries in the first semi-final and therefore failed to qualify to compete in the final. It was later revealed that Macedonia placed tenth in the semi-final, receiving a total of 45 points; and whilist it would have been enough to qualify in previous and upcoming years, in 2008 and 2009 only the top nine places qualified automatically and the tenth place was decided based on the votes of the backup juries, and this time, juries chose Finland to qualify over Macedonia.

=== Voting ===
The voting system for 2009 involved each country awarding points from 1–8, 10 and 12, with the points in the final being decided by a combination of 50% national jury and 50% televoting. Each nation's jury consisted of five music industry professionals who are citizens of the country they represent. This jury judged each entry based on: vocal capacity; the stage performance; the song's composition and originality; and the overall impression by the act. In addition, no member of a national jury was permitted to be related in any way to any of the competing acts in such a way that they cannot vote impartially and independently.

Below is a breakdown of points awarded to Macedonia and awarded by Macedonia in the first semi-final and grand final of the contest. The nation awarded its 12 points to Turkey in the semi-final and the final of the contest.

==== Points awarded to Macedonia ====
Points awarded to Macedonia (Semi-final 1)
Score	Country
12 points	
10 points	Bulgaria; Montenegro
8 points	Bosnia and Herzegovina
7 points	
6 points	Switzerland; Turkey
5 points	
4 points	
3 points	Czech Republic
2 points	Romania
1 point	

==== Points awarded by Macedonia ====
Points awarded by Macedonia (Semi-final 1)
Score	Country
12 points	Turkey
10 points	Bosnia and Herzegovina
8 points	Montenegro
7 points	Romania
6 points	Belarus
5 points	Bulgaria
4 points	Iceland
3 points	Sweden
2 points	Armenia
1 point	Israel

Points awarded by Macedonia (Final)
Score	Country
12 points	Turkey
10 points	Bosnia and Herzegovina
8 points	Norway
7 points	Albania
6 points	United Kingdom
5 points	Romania
4 points	Croatia
3 points	Azerbaijan
2 points	Iceland
1 point	Armenia

==== Detailed voting results ====
The following members comprised the Macedonian jury:

- Rade Spasovski
- Vanco Dimitrov
- Maja Trpčanovska
- Radica Mitić
- Liljana Avtovska

Detailed voting results from Macedonia (Final)
R/O	Country	Results			Points
R/O	Country	Jury	Televoting	Combined	Points
01	Lithuania				
02	Israel				
03	France				
04	Sweden				
05	Croatia	3	7	10	4
06	Portugal				
07	Iceland	4	1	5	2
08	Greece		4	4	
09	Armenia	5		5	1
10	Russia		2	2	
11	Azerbaijan	2	3	5	3
12	Bosnia and Herzegovina	10	8	18	10
13	Moldova	1		1	
14	Malta				
15	Estonia				
16	Denmark				
17	Germany				
18	Turkey	8	10	18	12
19	Albania		12	12	7
20	Norway	7	6	13	8
21	Ukraine				
22	Romania	6	5	11	5
23	United Kingdom	12		12	6
24	Finland				
25	Spain				
