= Macedonia in the Eurovision Song Contest 2013 =

- Eurovision Song Contest 2013
- Country: Macedonia
- Selection process: Internal selection
- Announcement date: Artist: 29 December 2012; Song: 15 March 2013

Competing entry
- Song: "Pred da se razdeni"
- Artist: Esma and Lozano
- Songwriters: Darko Dimitrov; Lazar Cvetkoski; Simeon Atanasov; Magdalena Cvetkoska

Placement
- Semi-final result: Failed to qualify (16th)

Participation chronology

Macedonia (Note: Officially under the provisional appellation "former Yugoslav Republic of Macedonia", abbreviated "FYR Macedonia".) was represented at the Eurovision Song Contest 2013 with the song "Pred da se razdeni" written by Darko Dimitrov, Lazar Cvetkoski, Simeon Atanasov and Magdalena Cvetkoska. The song was performed by Esma and Lozano, which were internally selected by the Macedonian broadcaster Macedonian Radio Television (MRT) to compete for Macedonia at the 2013 contest in Malmö, Sweden. Esma and Lozano's appointment as the Macedonian representatives were announced on 29 December 2012, while their song, "Imperija", was presented to the public in a television special on 27 February 2013. "Imperija" was later withdrawn due to negative reactions from the public and replaced with the song "Pred da se razdeni", which was presented to the public on 15 March 2013.

Macedonia was drawn to compete in the second semi-final of the Eurovision Song Contest which took place on 16 May 2013. Performing during the show in position 3, "Pred da se razdeni" was not announced among the top 10 entries of the second semi-final and therefore did not qualify to compete in the final. It was later revealed that Macedonia placed sixteenth out of the 17 participating countries in the semi-final with 28 points.

== Background ==
Prior to the 2013 contest, Macedonia had participated in the Eurovision Song Contest twelve times since its first entry in 1998. The nation's best result in the contest to this point was twelfth, which it achieved in 2006 with the song "Ninanajna" performed by Elena Risteska. Following the introduction of semi-finals for the 2004, Macedonia had featured in only five finals.

The Macedonian national broadcaster, Macedonian Radio Television (MRT), broadcasts the event within Macedonia and organises the selection process for the nation's entry. Macedonia had previously selected their entry for the Eurovision Song Contest through both national finals and internal selections. MRT confirmed their intentions to participate at the 2013 Eurovision Song Contest on 27 November 2012. Between 2008 and 2011, Macedonia selected their entries using the national final Skopje Fest. During this period, the nation failed to qualify to the final on every occasion. The broadcaster internally selected Macedonia's entry in 2012, resulting in a qualification to the final. For 2013, the broadcaster again opted to internally select the Macedonian entry.

== Before Eurovision ==
=== Internal selection ===
On 29 December 2012, MRT announced that they had internally selected Esma Redžepova and Vlatko Lozanoski to represent Macedonia in Malmö. Both singers previously attempted to represent Macedonia at the Eurovision Song Contest by competing in the country's national final selections on several occasions. Esma competed in 2006 with the song "Ljubov e..." which she performed in a duet with Adrijan Gaxha and placed second, while Lozano competed in 2009 with the song "Blisku do mene" and in 2010 with the song "Letam kon tebe", both of them which placed fourth. Esma also attempted to represented Yugoslavia in 1971 by competing in the national final with the song "Malo, malo" which placed third.

On 19 February 2013, it was announced that Esma and Lozano would perform the song "Imperija" at the Eurovision Song Contest 2013. "Imperija" was presented to the public in a special show hosted by Dimitar Atanasovski, which took place on 27 February 2013 at the MRT studios in Skopje and was broadcast on MRT 1 and MRT Sat. In addition to presenting Esma and Lozano's 2013 Eurovision entry, the show featured performances of songs from their repertoire and a guest performance by 2012 Macedonian Eurovision representative Kaliopi. "Imperija" was composed by Simeon Atanasov with lyrics written by Borče Nečovski, and was selected by a committee led by Head of Delegation Ljupco Mirkovski from songs submitted by well-known composers invited by MRT.

=== Replacement ===
On 8 March 2013, several Macedonian media outlets reported that "Imperija" would be withdrawn from the Eurovision Song Contest and replaced with a new song written by Darko Dimitrov, Lazar Cvetkoski and Simeon Atanasov due to negative reactions from the public, particularly with the music video which was claimed to be a glorification of the government-backed Skopje 2014 construction project. The new song, "Pred da se razdeni", was presented to the public on 15 March 2013 during the MRT evening news programme Dnevnik. "Pred da se razdeni" was composed by Darko Dimitrov, Lazar Cvetkoski and Simeon Atanasov with lyrics written by Magdalena Cvetkoska.

An English version was also recorded as "If I Could Change the World".

== At Eurovision ==
According to Eurovision rules, all nations with the exceptions of the host country and the "Big Five" (France, Germany, Italy, Spain and the United Kingdom) are required to qualify from one of two semi-finals in order to compete for the final; the top ten countries from each semi-final progress to the final. The European Broadcasting Union (EBU) split up the competing countries into six different pots based on voting patterns from previous contests, with countries with favourable voting histories put into the same pot. On 17 January 2013, a special allocation draw was held which placed each country into one of the two semi-finals, as well as which half of the show they would perform in. Macedonia was placed into the second semi-final, to be held on 16 May 2013, and was scheduled to perform in the first half of the show.

Once all the competing songs for the 2013 contest had been released, the running order for the semi-finals was decided by the shows' producers rather than through another draw, so that similar songs were not placed next to each other. Macedonia was set to perform in position 3, following the entry from San Marino and before the entry from Azerbaijan.

The two semi-finals and final were broadcast in Macedonia on MRT 1 and MRT Sat with commentary by Karolina Petkovska. The Macedonian spokesperson, who announced the Macedonian votes during the final, was Dimitar Atanasovski.

=== Semi-final ===
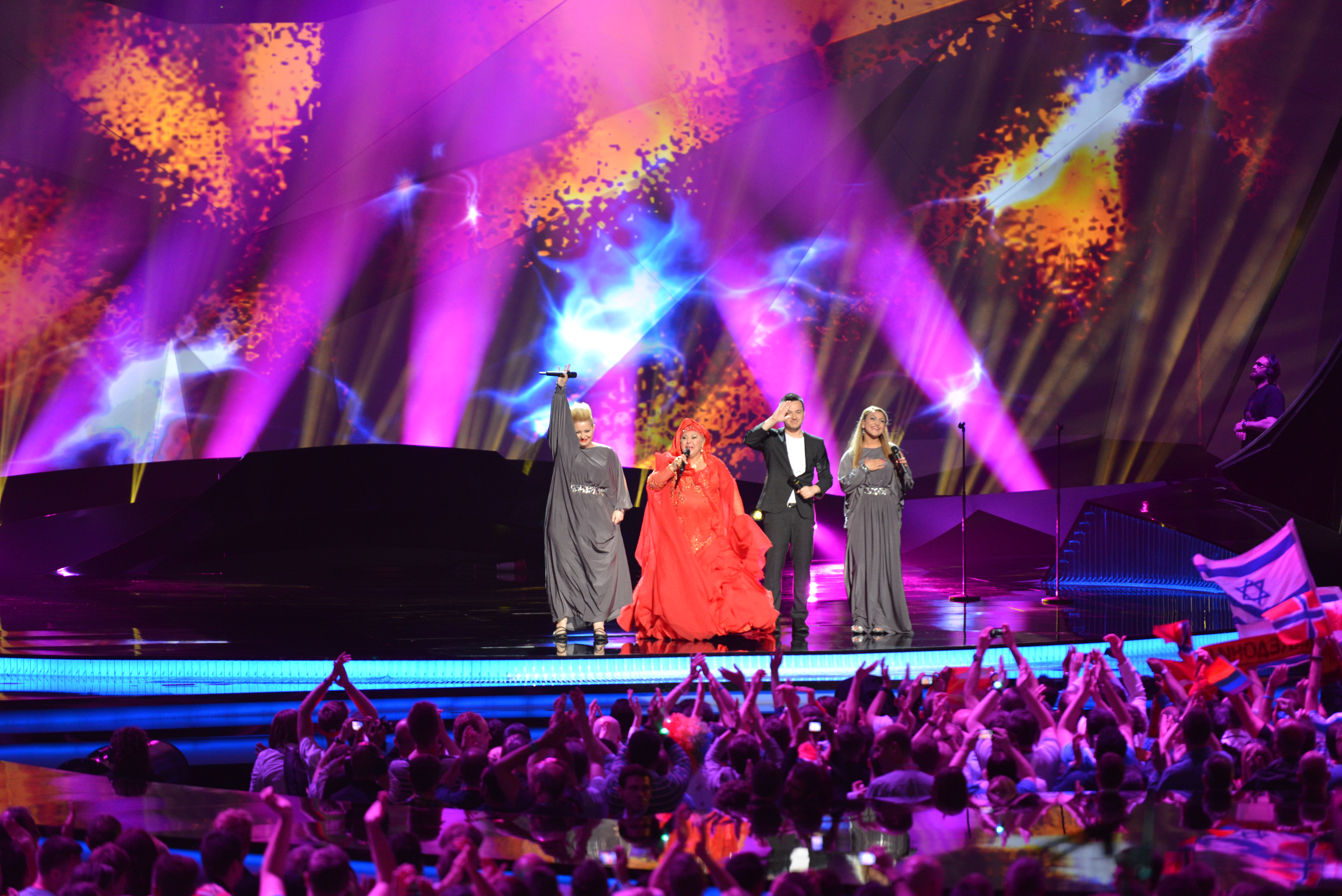
Esma and Lozano during a rehearsal before the second semi-final

Esma and Lozano took part in technical rehearsals on 8 and 11 May, followed by dress rehearsals on 15 and 16 May. This included the jury show on 15 May where the professional juries of each country watched and voted on the competing entries.

The Macedonian performance featured Esma and Lozano performing on stage together with two backing vocalists. Esma wore a red dress with Swarovski applications and a traditional Roma headscarf, designed by Elena Luka, while Lozano wore a black suit designed by Viktoria Arsovska and Andrej Gjorgiovski. The stage colours were predominately green, yellow and purple. After contemplating to add English language lyrics to the song and change the song title to "If I Could Change the World", the Macedonian delegation ultimately decided that the song would be performed in Macedonian. The two backing vocalists that joined Esma and Lozano on stage were Eleonora Mustafovska and Nina Janeva.

At the end of the show, Macedonia was not announced among the top 10 entries in the second semi-final and therefore failed to qualify to compete in the final. It was later revealed that Macedonia placed sixteenth in the semi-final, receiving a total of 28 points.

=== Voting ===
Voting during the three shows consisted of 50 percent public televoting and 50 percent from a jury deliberation. The jury consisted of five music industry professionals who were citizens of the country they represent. This jury was asked to judge each contestant based on: vocal capacity; the stage performance; the song's composition and originality; and the overall impression by the act. In addition, no member of a national jury could be related in any way to any of the competing acts in such a way that they cannot vote impartially and independently.

Following the release of the full split voting by the EBU after the conclusion of the competition, it was revealed that Macedonia had placed sixteenth it the public televote and fourteenth with the jury vote in the second semi-final. In the public vote, Macedonia received an average rank of 12.22, while with the jury vote, Macedonia received an average rank of 9.75.

Below is a breakdown of points awarded to Macedonia and awarded by Macedonia in the second semi-final and grand final of the contest. The nation awarded its 12 points to Malta in the semi-final and to Denmark in the final of the contest.

==== Points awarded to Macedonia ====
Points awarded to Macedonia (Semi-final 2)
| Score | Country |
|---|---|
| 12 points | Albania |
| 10 points | |
| 8 points | |
| 7 points | |
| 6 points | |
| 5 points | Bulgaria; Malta |
| 4 points | Switzerland |
| 3 points | |
| 2 points | San Marino |
| 1 point | |

==== Points awarded by Macedonia ====
Points awarded by Macedonia (Semi-final 2)
| Score | Country |
|---|---|
| 12 points | Malta |
| 10 points | Albania |
| 8 points | Azerbaijan |
| 7 points | Norway |
| 6 points | Greece |
| 5 points | San Marino |
| 4 points | Georgia |
| 3 points | Bulgaria |
| 2 points | Latvia |
| 1 point | Romania |

Points awarded by Macedonia (Final)
| Score | Country |
|---|---|
| 12 points | Denmark |
| 10 points | Italy |
| 8 points | Norway |
| 7 points | Moldova |
| 6 points | Russia |
| 5 points | Belarus |
| 4 points | Greece |
| 3 points | Malta |
| 2 points | Netherlands |
| 1 point | France |
