= Eden ubav den =

Single by Robert Vukelik
- Released: 2012
- Genre: Pop Rock
- Songwriter(s): Risto Apostolov, Valentina Gorgievska Pargo
- Producer(s): Risto Apostolov

"Eden ubav den (One Fine Day)" is a song performed by Robert Vukelik. The music is composed by Risto Apostolov from Vodolija, and the lyrics were written by journalist Valentina Gorgievska Pargo. The song was released on Valentine's Day, February 14, 2012.
