= Next Time =

Macedonian band

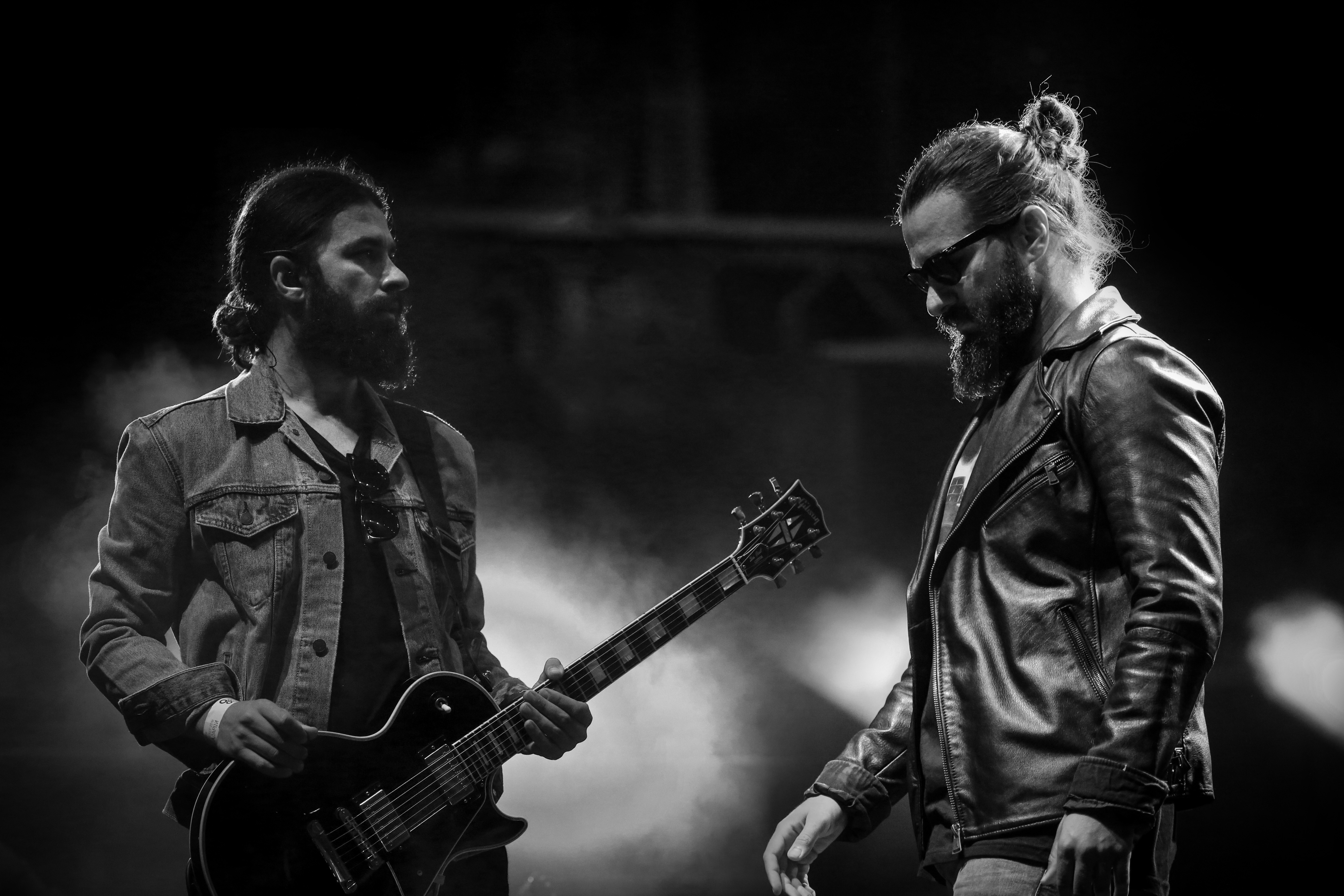
- Stefan (right) and Martin Filipovski from Next Time

Background information
- Origin: Skopje, Macedonia
- Genres: Rock, Pop
- Instruments: Guitar, Keyboards
- Years active: 2008 – present
- Members: Stefan Filipovski; Martin Filipovski
- Website: www.nexttimeband.mk

Next Time (sometimes rendered "Некст Тајм" in Macedonian Cyrillic) is a rock duo from Skopje, North Macedonia. The duo consists of twin brothers Martin and Stefan Filipovski. Stefan fronts the band as the lead singer, while Martin plays the guitar and sings back-up vocals. The group represented the Republic of Macedonia at the Eurovision Song Contest 2009 in Moscow, Russia but failed to reach the final. In their active years, since 2008, they have released three studio albums including the self-titled debut in 2008, Na krajot od denot (English: At the End of the Day) in 2011 and Majka (English: Mother) in 2022.

== History ==
=== 2008-2012: Early career, Eurovision Song Contest and debut studio album ===
Next Time was formed in early 2008 after they signed with Plan B Production. Previously they performed as a garage band at children's music festivals. Discovered by composer and songwriter, Jovan Jovanov, the Macedonian duo released their first single "Ne veruvam vo tebe" ("I Don't Believe in You") in May, 2008. The song's lyrics were written by Next Time with Jovanov as the producer. "Ne veruvam vo tebe" immediately topped a number of charts in Macedonia and was quickly a hit. The band also released their first music video for the song. Next Time's first festival appearance was at the First Radio Music Festival "Zvezdena Nok" in June, 2008. At "Zvezdena Nok", the duo won the "Summer Hit of the Year" award with their second song "Me misliš li?" (English: Am I In Your Thoughts?). Two months later at Ohrid Fest, Next Time were voted "Best New Artist" with their third single "Me ostavi sam da živeam" (English: You Left Me Live Alone). Next Time's biggest festival success came in October when they won the second semi-final at MakFest. With their fourth single "Bez tebe tivko umiram" (English: I'm Slowly Dying Without You) they went on to finish second in the final, only three points behind the winner.

On 16 December 2008, Next Time released their self-titled debut album which featured 13 songs, two of which were bonus songs sung in a foreign language. One of the bonus songs, "Why Did You Go" was in English. The other song was a cover of the Italian pop-opera song "Caruso". The first four singles were all accompanied by music videos.

In February 2009, Next Time competed at Skopje Fest, a Macedonian music competition and the national selection for the country's Eurovision Song Contest entry, performing the song "Nešto što kje ostane" (English: Something that Will Remain). The group won the competition, and represented Macedonia at the Eurovision Song Contest 2009. Competing in the first semi-final, Next Time did not advance to the finals, finishing in 10th place after the viewers' and the jury's vote.

Briefly after their Eurovision performance, on 24 December 2009, the duo gave a concert at the Universal Hall in Skopje.

=== 2012-2014: Na krajot na denot ===
The band's second studio album Na krajot na denot (English: At the End of the Day) was released in 2012. In March 2012, Next Time started filming the music video for the song "Lice od raj" (English: A Face of Paradise) under Tomato produkcija. Filming took place several days at several locations in Skopje, including a private apartment in Karpoš 4, the town square in Skopje and Triumph Arch. It showed an urban story starring model Angela Popovska from Models IN in her music video debut.

After the release of their second album, the duo made a hiatus from the music industry.

The summer of 2018 saw the duo perform at the "Edna ljubov" (English: One Love) music festival held in North Macedonia and Bulgaria; they gave eight concerts in Skopje, Sofija, Bansko, Strumica, Varna, Ruse, Kavadarci and Stara Zagora several of which were their first-ever performances.

=== 2022-present: Majka and performances ===
In 2022, the band released the album Majka which they had worked on for eight years. In 2023, the duo held their first concert tour in Australia.

In the spring of 2024, the band embarked on a tour in Australia, visiting cities Sydney, Wollongong, Gold Coast, Melbourne and Perth.

On 21 October 2025, the duo released a minute-long video to their social media of how they are playing on the guitars and singing the Macedonian children song "Vo svetot na bajkite" (Macedonian: In the World of Fairytales) in a home setting.

== Discography ==
=== Albums ===
- Next Time (2008)
- Na krajot od denot (At the end of the day) (2011)
- Majka (Mother) (2022)

=== Solo singles ===
- "Ne veruvam vo tebe" (2008)
- "Me misliš li?" (2008)
- "Me ostavi sam da živeam" (2008)
- "Bez tebe tivko umiram" (2008)
- "Caruso" (2008)
- "Nešto što kje ostane" (2009)
- "The Sweetest Thing That Will Remain" (2009)
- "Milion" (2009)
- "Nemam ni glas" (2009)
- "Koga lažeš, kade gledaš?" (2009)
- "Dekemvri" (2009)
- "Ramo za plačenje" (2010)
- "Ubava" (2010)
- "Na krajot od denot" (2010)
- "Nedostaješ mi več" (2011)
- "Rap n Roll" (2011)
- "Posledno od nas" (2012)
- "Čekam na tebe" (2012)
- "Lice od raj" (2012)
- "Next Time" (2013)
- "Svetot vo race" (2013)
- "Ja izlezi Gjurgjo" (2014)
- "Slušam kaj šumat šumite" (2017)
- "Nesto ke te pitam babo" (2019)
- "Jovka Kumanovka" (2019)
- "Koga padna na Pirina" (2022)

== Awards ==
=== Radiski Festival - Zvezdena Nok (June, 2008) ===
- Summer Hit of the Year

=== TV Orbis (August, 2008) ===
- Star Orbit of popularity (Macedonian: Ѕвездена Орбита На Популарноста)

=== Ohrid Fest (August, 2008) ===
- Best New Artist

=== Makfest (October, 2008) ===
- First place (semi-final night)
- Second place (final night)

=== MARS Festival ===
- Hit of the Year 2008 - "Me ostavi sam da živeam"
- Hit of the Year 2009 - "Nešto što kje ostane"
- Hit of the Year 2010 - "Ubava"
- Hit of the Year 2011 - "Na krajot od denot"
- Hit of the Year 2012 - "Lice od raj"

=== Skopje Fest (February, 2009) ===
- First Place - Qualified for Eurovision 2009

=== Zlatna Buba mara na popularnosta (2009) ===
- Best New Artist

=== Zlatna Buba mara na popularnosta (2022) ===
- Best video (Koga Padna na Pirina)

=== Marco Polo Festival (Korčula, Croatia 2011, 2012) ===
- First Place with the song Nedostaješ mi več (Miss You Already 2011)
- Second Place with the song Poslednje od nas (The Last of Us 2012)

=== Other awards ===
- SuperStar (Macedonian: Супер Ѕвезда) - Teenage Idols of 2008
- Macedonian Ministry of Culture - Diploma for Recognition

=== Concerts ===
- Univerzalna Sala Skopje (2009)
- Heraklea Bitola (2010)

Awards and achievements
Preceded by Tamara, Vrčak & Adrian with "Let Me Love You"	Macedonia in the Eurovision Song Contest; 2009	Succeeded by Gjoko Taneski with "Jas ja imam silata"
