= Skopje Fest =

Macedonian television singing program

- Also known as: Festival na zabavni melodii Skopje
- Genre: Music; entertainment
- Country of origin: North Macedonia
- Original language: Macedonian
- No. of series: 24

Production
- Production location: Skopje

Original release
- Network: MRT
- Release: 1969

Skopje Fest (Macedonian: Скопје фест), officially Festival na zabavni melodii Skopje (Фестивал на забавни мелодии Скопје, 'Festival of entertaining melodies of Skopje'), is a televised musical event in North Macedonia, and formerly in Yugoslavia. The show, organized by the national broadcaster Macedonian Radio Television (MRT), involves some of North Macedonia's most popular performers, singing original tracks, usually accompanied by the MRT orchestra.

== History ==
The festival began in 1968 at the Universal Hall in Skopje and continued until 1980. Popular Macedonian and Yugoslav singers, such as Slave Dimitrov, Zafir Hadžimanov, and Nina Spirova, performed at Skopje Fest during that period. The event was revived in 1994, after Macedonia gained its independence from Yugoslavia.

Since the late 1990s, Skopje Fest has been used as the Macedonian national selections for the Eurovision Song Contest. The first Macedonian representative at Eurovision, Vlado Janevski, won Skopje Fest 1998 with the song "Ne zori, zoro" and went on to perform at the Eurovision Song Contest 1998.

Until 2002, Skopje Fest was the largest musical event in the country. However, it has since faced financial problems and was not held in 2003. It briefly returned in 2004 and was once again dormant until 2008, when it was used as the national final for Eurovision. In 2011, it was announced that Skopje Fest would continue being held as an independent event, without being involved in the Eurovision Song Contest 2012. It was used again as the North Macedonian national final for the Eurovision Song Contest 2015, being dropped since then in favor of internal selections.

In October 2026, MRT announced that Skopje Fest would return in 2027.

== Winners ==
| Year | Song | Artist |
|---|---|---|
| 1968 | "Sramežlivi lugje" (Срамежливи луѓе) | Violeta Tomovska, Ljupka Dimitrovska, Zafir Hadžimanov, and Dime Tomovski |
| 1969 | "Soul Makedonijo" (Соул Македонијо) | Bezimeni |
| 1971 | "Samo ti" (Само ти) | Zoran Milosavljević |
| 1971 | "Samo ti" (Само ти) | Miki Jevremović |
| 1972 | "Odi si" (Оди си) | Dragan Mijalkovski |
| 1972 | "Prispivna za rekata" (Приспивна за реката) | Senka Veletanlić |
| 1973 | "Tivko tivko" (Тивко тивко) | Goce Nikolovski |
| 1973 | "Na ovoj den" (На овој ден) | Nina Spirova |
| 1974 | "Golubica" (Голубица) | Dragan Mijalkovski |
| 1974 | "V oblak sonce" (В облак сонце) | Maja Odžaklievska |
| 1978 | "O, ljubov neverna" (О, љубов неверна) | Zafir Hadžimanov |
| 1994 | "Ne me dopiraj" (Не допирај ме) | Maja Odžaklievska |
| 1995 | "Što te nema" (Што те нема) | Lidija Kočovska |
| 1996 | "Samo ti" (Само ти) | Kaliopi |
| 1997 | "Manastirski son" (Манастирски сон) | Pece Ognenov |
| 1998 | "Ne zori, zoro" (Не зори, зоро) | Vlado Janevski |
| 1999 | "Sejačot" (Сејачот) | Sašo Gigov Giš |
| 2000 | "100% te ljubam" (100% те љубам) | XXL |
| 2001 | "Nostalgija" (Носталгија) | Andrijana Janevska |
| 2002 | "Od nas zavisi" (Од нас зависи) | Karolina Gočeva |
| 2007 | "Mojot svet" (Mojoт свет) | Karolina Gočeva |
| 2008 | "Vo ime na ljubovta" (Во име на љубовта) | Tamara, Vrčak, and Adrian |
| 2009 | "Nešto što kje ostane" (Нешто што ќе остане) | Next Time |
| 2010 | "Jas ja imam silata" (Јас ја имам силата) | Gjoko Taneski feat. Billy Zver and Pejčin |
| 2011 | "Rusinka" (Русинкa) | Vlatko Ilievski |
| 2013 | "Kje te čekam jas" (Ќе те чекам јас) | Lambe Alabakovski |
| 2014 | "Lisja esenski" (Лисја есенски) | Daniel Kajmakoski |
| 2015 | "Ubava" (Убава) | Eye Cue |
