= Aleksandar Makedonski =

Macedonian rock band

- Origin: Skopje, North Macedonia
- Genres: Rock, pop rock, alternative rock
- Years active: 1986–1992, 1995–1997
- Labels: Jugodisk, Makoton
- Spinoff of: Badmingtons
- Past members: Vladimir Petrovski; Zoran Jankovic; Vladimir Dimovski; Dejan Shkartov; Melita Stefanovska; Boris Georgiev; Aleksandar Krstevski

Aleksandar Makedonski (Macedonian: Александар Македонски, lit. 'Alexander of Macedonia') was a Macedonian and former Yugoslav rock band.

== Biography ==
Aleksandar Makedonski was formed in 1986 in Skopje, then in socialist Yugoslavia as an offshoot of the prominent punk rock group Badmingtons, and it included the frontman Vladimir Petrovski - Karter (guitar, vocals), Dejan Škartov-Deko (keyboards), Zoran Janković - Bajo (bass guitar), Vladimir Dimovski (drums) and the female singer Melita Stefanovska (backing vocals). Unlike Badmingtons, who were a punk band, Aleksandar Makedonski was initially a more pop-rock oriented act.

The third former Badmingtons member, drummer Boris Georgiev - But, instead joined gothic rock cult band Mizar and played on their first self-titled album released in 1988.

Aleksandar Makedonski recorded several songs for the national Macedonian Radio-Television music production and soon became popular across the country. The group released its debut album Za heroje i princeze in 1988 for Jugodisk record label in 1988. Unlike their previous material, the album was in Serbo-Croatian, because it was the most widespread language in the multilingual former Yugoslav market.

In 1990, they appeared on the compilation tape Demoskop 1, released by Mladinski Radio Klub 100, with the tracks "Mi se igra..." and "Sekjavanja".

The line-up soon changed. Melita Stefanovska left and joined the all-female alternative rock band Royal Albert Hall (who appeared on Demoskop 1 alongside her former band), while Dimovski joined the psychedelic rock group Kleržo (who also appeared on Demoskop 1) together with Vlasto-Lucky and Škartov who later moved to Italy in 1991. Karter continued to work with a new bass player Mite Brljamov, but with a different musical style. In 1991, they recorded songs for their planned second album at the studio of Nikola Kokan Dimuševski of Leb i sol. The material was recorded by Vladimir Petrovski - Karter (guitars, vocals); Igor Atanasoski - Hare (guitars); Vlasto 'Lucky' Janevik (bass); Mihajlo Kostadinovski - Miki (drums). The session was never released, however the track "Voz", a duet with Goran Tanevski of Mizar, was leaked in 2013 and released on the Macedonian Document - Step 4 compilation. The group then broke up.

In 1995, Aleksandar Makedonski reconvened with Karter, Bajo, Deko and But, plus rhythm guitarist Aleksandar Krstevski - Cane. This lineup's first release was the song "Ako bide se vo red", recorded in March 1995 and released on the Macedonian Document - Step 2 compilation that year. Between May 1995 and May 1996, the group's second album Moeto carstvo was recorded, being released on the Makoton label in 1996. All three original members of Badmingtons are on Moeto carstvo, giving the album a style reminiscent of Badmingtons.

In 1997, the group disbanded, and Karter switched to studio and film work, forming a new group called Opstrukcija later that year. Opstrukcija released their debut and only album, Sistem, in 1999. Badmingtons got back together for reunions in 2002 and 2007. A CD single of "Ako mi dadesh" was released in 2007, though the song was credited to Badmingtons (and credited to Opstrukcija in the film itself).

== Discography ==
- Za heroje i princeze (1988)
- Moeto carstvo (1996)

== See also ==
- Music of the Republic of Macedonia
- Yugoslav pop and rock
