= Petar Georgiev-Kalica =

Macedonian composer and songwriter (born 1951)

Petar Georgiev-Kalica Петар Георгиев-Калица
- Also known as: Kalica
- Born: Petar Georgiev; November 15, 1951 (age 74); Bitola, SR Macedonia, SFR Yugoslavia
- Genres: Pop, Macedonian Traditional music, Folk
- Occupations: Songwriter, Composer

Petar Georgiev-Kalica (Macedonian: Петар Георгиев-Калица, born November 19, 1951, in Bitola) is a Macedonian composer and songwriter. Many of his compositions are traditional folk songs inspired by his home town of Bitola.

His first major success was in 1989 when he participated in the Macedonian music festival Valandovo as a songwriter of the song "Ako odam vo Bitola" ("If I go to Bitola"), performed by Oktet Makedonija. The song won third place from the jury. It is one of the most famous songs ever written about the town of Bitola and the lyrics are about Bitola's old traditions. "Ako odam vo Bitola" is used in making many documentaries and music events dedicated to Bitola. Taking into consideration the fact that this song is still popular, cover of this song was made by the most famous Macedonian music star Toše Proeski on his ethnic album "Božilak" ("Rainbow").

Also in 1989, he performed at the Macedonian pop festival MakFest, where he participated as a songwriter of the Macedonian hit "Letaj mi letaj gulabe" ("Fly, my dove") performed by Croatian singer Krunoslav "Kićo" Slabinac. This song won second place, missing the first place by one vote from the audience. Georgiev-Kalica won the prize for best lyrics for this song. The song is still popular in the Balkans.

In 1991, he wrote "Stariot džumbušlija", performed by Serbian folk singer Ana Bekuta, at the Valandovo festival. The song was ranked 4th, missing 3rd place by 3 votes. This was a hit in the Republic of Macedonia, winning the prize for most listened song from the audience in 1992.

The same year, he took part in MakFest as a composer of the song "Rozite pak se tazni" ("Roses are still sad") performed by Slovenian singer Simona Weiss.

As a songwriter he participated twice on Skopje Fest, a festival that has been used as Macedonian national selection for Eurovision Song Contest:

- 1998, "Son" ("Dream"), performed by Monika Sokolovska.
- 2000, "Dali ti si ova nebo" ("Are you this heaven"), performed by Marjan Stojanoski.

U.S. flute and guitar duo "Alma Nova" covered his song "Ako odam vo Bitola" on their album "After hours", with the title "Bitola", recorded February, 2009.
