= Cilindar =

Macedonian band

Cilindar (Macedonian: Цилиндар) is a new wave, ska, 2 Tone and reggae band from Skopje, North Macedonia formed in the early 1980s, in the then SR Macedonia.

Today its former members are respectable solo or band artists in the Macedonian music scene:

- Dimitar "Mite" Dimovski - Димитар Мите Димовски (drums) is a drummer of Macedonian cult band Arhangel.
- Petar Rendžov - Петар Ренџов (guitar) became a prominent ethno jazz and blues guitarist as well as studio musician for other popular artists.
- Risto Samardžiev - Ристо Самарџиев (vocals) - after the dissolution of Cilindar in 1983 he formed the new wave and later pop-rock band Haos in Laos in 1984. In 1987, he started a successful solo career as a pop singer winning an award for best performance at the Makfest festival in the same year. Later he was also a vocalist of the popular Macedonian band Memorija. Several times he was also a candidate at the Macedonian national preselections for the Eurovision Song Contest.

The band recorded several songs and videos for the national Macedonian Radio-Television of which Samo eden del is the most popular.

After its split in the mid-1980s, the band members gathered again for a reunion concert at the Bob Marley tribute festival held in Skopje in 2008.

== Trivia ==
The name of the band is a misspelling of the word Cylinder (Цилиндер) which means a cylinder.

== See also ==
- Haos in Laos
- Music of North Macedonia
- New wave music in Yugoslavia
