= Venera Lumani =

Albanian singer (born 1991)

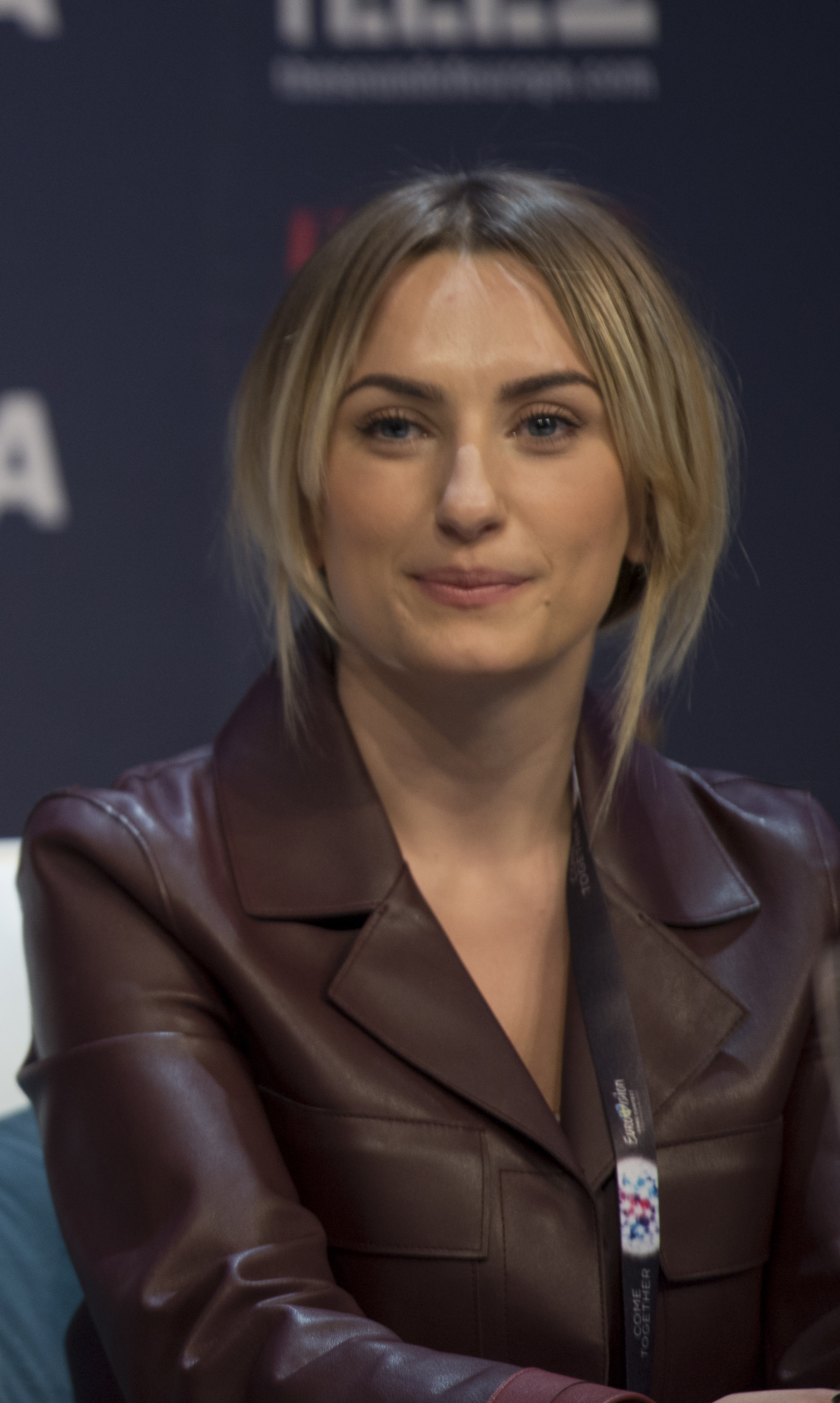
- Venera Lumani at the 2016 Eurovision Song Contest

Background information
- Also known as: Venus
- Born: 16 June 1991 (age 33); Radolista, Struga, SFR Yugoslavia
- Genres: Pop; R&B; soul; jazz
- Occupation: Singer
- Instruments: Vocals
- Years active: 2007–present

Venera Lumani (born 16 June 1991) is an Albanian singer from North Macedonia. She rose to fame after winning the second season of The Voice of Albania. She has participated in various music festivals in Albania, such as Top Fest, Festivali i Këngës and Kënga Magjike. She currently lives in Tirana, Albania.

== Life and career ==
=== Early life and career ===
Venera Lumani was born on June 16, 1991, in Radolista, a village based in Struga Municipality in southwestern North Macedonia. Her father was a musician but he didn't pursue his music career. She studied at Ss. Cyril and Methodius University in Skopje. Lumani began her singing career by participating in the second season of Star Academy Albania in 2007, where she reached the final. Prior to her national breakthrough in the Albanian music industry, Lumani had attempted to represent Macedonia at the 2009 Eurovision Song Contest by competing in the national selection Skopje Fest 2009 with the song "Povtorno ljubena". However, she failed to advance from the semi-final rounds of the competition.

=== 2012: The Voice of Albania ===
In 2012, she entered the Albanian series of The Voice and successfully passed the preliminary stages. At her blind audition, she sang "Lullaby of Birdland" and received a great feedback from the four judges who all turned their chairs to have Lumani in their team; she decided to join Sidrit Bejleri's team. She managed to qualify through all the other phases, and was eventually announced as the winner of the show.

=== 2013–14: Top Fest and Festivali i Këngës ===
In 2013, Lumani competed in the 52nd edition of Festivali i Këngës, which selected the Albanian entry for the Eurovision Song Contest 2014. She performed the song "Natë e parë" together with Lindi Islami, finishing in fourth place. In 2014, Venera Lumani returned to the 53rd edition of Festivali i Këngës, with "Dua të jetoj". She advanced to the final and finished 9th out of 18.

In early 2014, Venera participated in the eleventh edition of Top Fest with "Mos më numëro", and passed the preliminary and semifinal stage of the contest. In the final she won the Best Ballad award, and the song gained positive feedback from the public.

== Discography ==
- 2008: Dua të të dua
- 2010: Vargje për të dy (ft. Guximtar Rushani)
- 2013: Natë e parë (ft. Lind Islami)
- 2014: Mos më numëro
- 2014: E doja
- 2014: Dua të jetoj
- 2015: Love
- 2015: 16 qershori
- 2015: Zemër në katror (ft. Lind Islami)
- 2016: Siento amor (ft. Lind Islami)
- 2017: Venus
- 2017: Don't Stop Me Now (ft. DJ Sardi)
- 2018: Betohem (ft. Lind Islami)

== Awards and nominations ==
The Voice

Year	Nominee / work	Award	Result
2012	"Herself"	First Prize	Won

Top Fest

Year	Nominee / work	Award	Result
2014	"Mos më numëro"	Best Ballad	Won

Kënga Magjike

Year	Nominee / work	Award	Result
2015	"Zemër në katror" (ft. Lind Islami)	Best New Artist	Won
