= Haos in Laos =

Macedonian new wave and pop-rock band

Haos in Laos (Macedonian: Хаос ин Лаос) was a Macedonian new wave and pop-rock band from Skopje, SR Macedonia from 1984–1987. Its frontman Risto Samardžiev, formerly a vocalist of the band Cilindar, later started a successful solo career as a pop singer, while its drummer Borjan Jovanovski, later became a prominent journalist in the Republic of Macedonia, specialized on EU issues, a correspondent of Voice of America from Skopje and a spokesman of the former President of the Republic of Macedonia Boris Trajkovski. The guitarist of Haos in Laos was Zlatan Milivojevic.

== Songs ==
- Ne sakam mrak - I don't like darkness
- Lugje kukli - People puppets
- Pesna za vilata - The fairy song
- Na krajot od gradot - At the end of the city
- Bidi mi se - Be my everything
- Suze - Tears
- Zasekogaš del - Forever a part
- Rio

== See also ==
- Music of the Republic of Macedonia
- SFR Yugoslav pop and rock scene
