= Nokaut =

Macedonian pop group

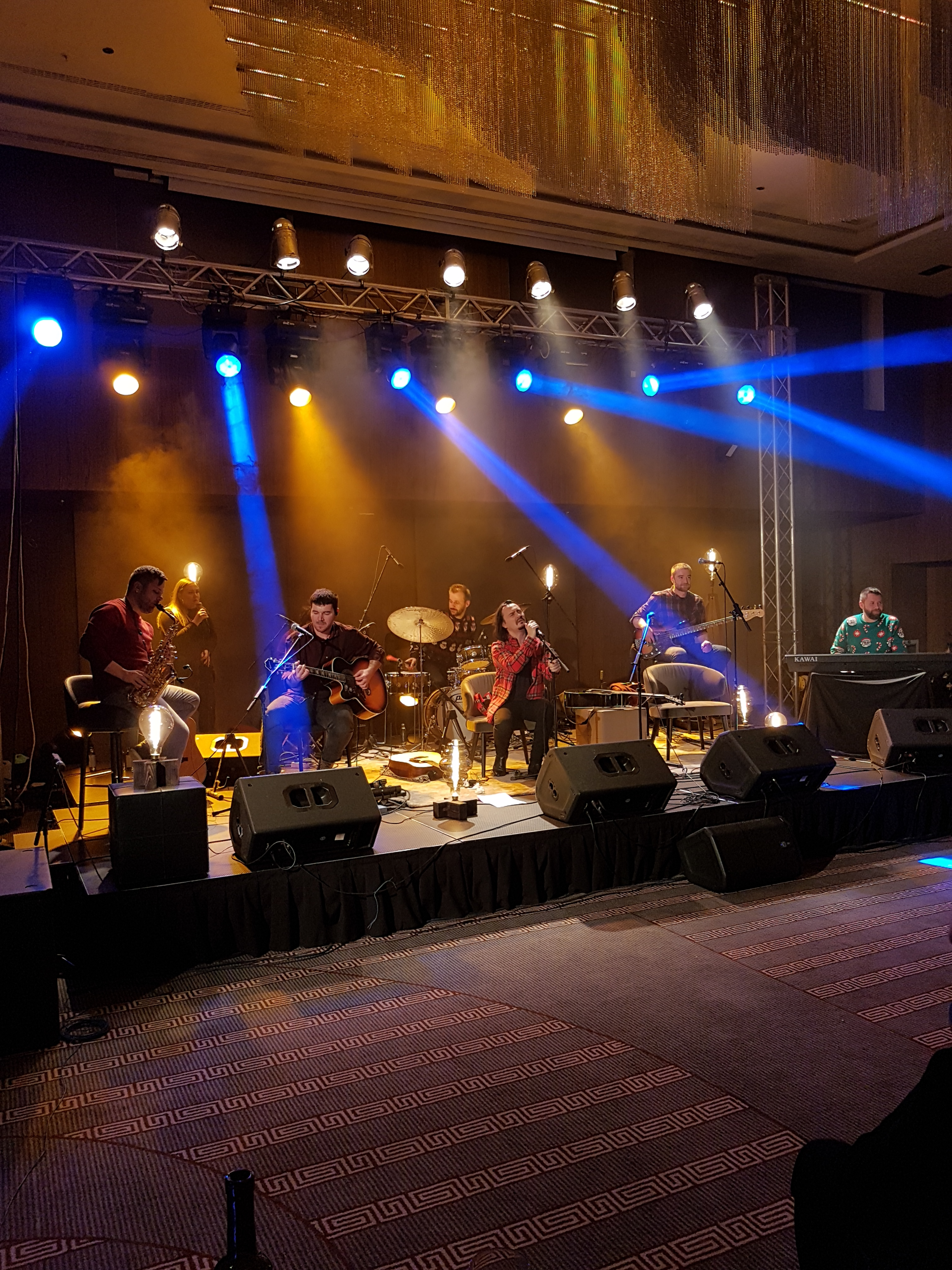
- Unplugged album recording

Background information
- Origin: Skopje, Macedonia
- Genres: Pop, Rock
- Years active: 1997–2003, 2005–present
- Members: Nikola Perevski - Pere; Blagoja Antovski; Gorjan Petrovski; Bojan Perevski; Borče Kuzmanovski; Viktor Nikolovski; Goran Kavrakov
- Past members: Kiril Kolemiševski; Aco Bogdanovski; Vladimir Krstevski - Franc (guitar); Luaj Redžepov
- Website: nokaut.mk

Nokaut (Macedonian: Нокаут) is a Macedonian pop group founded in the 1997 by Nikola Perevski - Pere (vocals) and Vladimir Krstevski - Franc (guitar). Later in the music band were invited Kiril Kolemiševski (vocals), Aco Bogdanovski (percussions). After a break between 2003 and 2006, the band reformed in changed, expanded composition.

The term Nokaut is Macedonian rendering of the English work knockout. They were quite popular in Macedonia during the late 1990s, and published two albums: self-titled "Nokaut" in 1997 and "Do posleden zdiv" (Till the last breath) in 2001.

Their biggest hits include "ABC" (Macedonian language cover of "ABC" by The Jackson 5), "HI-FI" (Macedonian cover version of C'est La Vie by Robbie Nevil), "Fatalna opsesija" (Fatal Obsession), "Bi se vikal te sakam" (My name would be I Love You), "Telefonskiot broj ne postoi" (The telephone number does not exist), "Iljada prichini za kraj" (1000 reasons for breakup), "Mene mi pripagjash" (You belong to me), "Vremenska mashina" (Time machine – cover of "September" by Earth, Wind & Fire), etc.

In 1998 and 1999 Nokaut won the Macedonian "Teenage attraction" award as Band of the Year. In 2001, they won the Zlatna Bubamara (Golden Ladybug) Award for an album, and the Grant Prix at the official Eurosong selection at the Skopje Festival in 2002 for the song "Od nas zavisi" performed by Karolina Gočeva.

During 2011, Nokaut held a string of concerts, and announced an upcoming album, scheduled for 2012. In 2020, Nokaut won the MakFest festival with the song "Сакам да живеам" (I want to live).

== Discography ==
- Nokaut (produced by Darko Dimitrov, 1998)

·01. Intro
·02. Fatalna Opsesija
·03. Bum
·04. El Mambo
·05. Bi se vikal te sakam
·06. Taras Buljba
·07. Ti si lud
·08. ABC (Intro)
·09. ABC
·10. Vremenska mashina
·11. Sina svetlina
·12. Ni luk jal ni luk mirisal
·13. Nokaut
·14. Dozhdot

- Do posleden zdiv (produced by Ante Pecotic and Kristina Kovač, 2002)

·01. Mene mi pripagjash (You belong to me)
·02. Feel the music
·03. Madam Poison
·04. Soba 203 (Room 203)
·05. Telefonskiot broj ne postoi (The telephone number does not exist)
·06. Iljada prichini za kraj (1000 reasons for breakup)
·07. Zasekogash (Forever)
·08. Do posleden zdiv (Till the last breath)
·09. T.B.N.P. Instrumental

- DeLuxe (2007)

·01. Fatalna opsesija
·02. Sina svetlina
·03. Telefonskiot broj ne postoi
·04. Taras Buljba
·05. Soba 203
·06. 1000 prichini za kraj
·07. Lebedot bel
·08. TV Radio
·09. Zasekogash
·10. Bi se vikal te sakam
·11. Mene mi pripagjash
·12. Vremenska mashina
·13. Hi-Fi
·14. 1000 prichini za kraj (club mix)
·14. Dozhdot

- Tri (Three) (produced by Nokaut, 2014)

·01. Dobro utro budenje
·02. Da si tuka vecherva
·03. Zhelba
·04. Afrika
·05. Samovila
·06. Zapomni, toa e se shto imame
·07. Lebedot bel
·08. Kje bide vo red
·09. Tango
·10. La vita e bella
·11. Ostavi me na mir
·12. Leat dozhdovi
·13. Izvini
·14. Poinaku
·15. Shesto setilo
·16. TV Radio
·17. Znaesh kade da me najdesh

Nokaut discography on ВБУ Музички Регистар (VBU Music Registry). (NOTE: Macedonian version only)
