= Maja Odžaklievska =

Macedonian pop-rock singer (born 1954)

Maja Odžaklievska Маја Оџаклиевска Маја Оџаклијевска
- Born: Maja Odžaklievska; April 21, 1954 (age 72); Skopje, PR Macedonia, FPR Yugoslavia
- Origin: Macedonian
- Genres: Pop rock
- Occupation: Artist/Singer
- Years active: 1969 – present

Maja Odžaklievska (in Macedonian, Маја Оџаклиевска; in English, Maya Odjaklievska; born April 21, 1954, in Skopje), is a Macedonian, Serbian and ex-Yugoslav singer and songwriter popular across Europe. She lives and works in Serbia.

== Biography ==
Maja Odžaklievska began her musical career as a 15-year-old girl, appearing at an audition for Radio Skopje. In 1970, she moved to Belgrade. Radoslav Grajić invited her to participate in the radio show "Maksimetar", which she won and then received a supporting role in an adaptation of "Rabelais" by Jean-Louis Barrault. She has participated in numerous festivals throughout the former Federation including several candidatures at the Eurovision Song Contest.

In 1982, Odžaklievska competed in Jugovizija with the song "Julija", scoring 57 points and placing second. She returned to the competition the following year in 1983 with the song "Lidu Lidu Du" and scored 46 points and placed third. In 1984, she entered once again with the song "Niki", scoring 51 points and placing second. Her final participation was in 1988, performing "Te Ljubam Ludo" with group Gu-Gu. They scored 42 points and placed sixth.

In 1974 she won Skopje fest with the song "V oblak sonce|.In 1994, Odžaklievska won Skopje Fest with the song "Ne me dopiraj" composed by Grigor Koprov with lyrics by Odžaklievska herself.

In 2006, Odžaklievska took part in the selection to represent Macedonia in the Eurovision Song Contest 2006 with the song "Koj pat da izberam". She finished ninth in a field of 20 songs.

On 2 March 2013, Maja competed in Beosong 2013, the national final to select the Eurovision entry for Serbia with the song "Anđeo s neba". Her song did not advance from the semifinal.

== Discography ==
=== Albums ===
- Biće sve u redu (PGP RTB, 1982)
- Bele njive (PGP RTS, 1995)

=== Singles ===
- Kad nežne svirke zamre ton/V oblak sonce (PGP RTB, 1974)
- Mjesečev san/Šapni mi (RTV Ljubljana, 1976)
- Ti si moj sledeći promašaj/Danjne (PGP RTS, 1979)
- Odnosiš mi srce moje/Vraćam se (PGP RTB, 1980)
- Između nas/Tako mora biti (PGP RTB, 1981)
- Ne podnosim dan/Slušam te, gledam te (PGP RTB, 1981)
