= Vlatko Lozanoski =

Vlatko Lozanoski - Lozano Влатко Лозаноски - Лозано
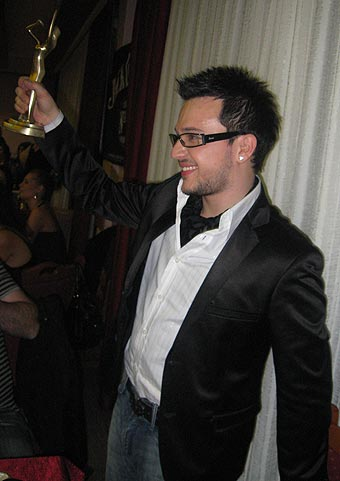

Background information
- Birth name: Vlatko Lozanoski
- Born: 27 June 1985 (age 40)
- Origin: Kičevo, SR Macedonia, SFR Yugoslavia (present-day North Macedonia)
- Genres: Pop, Rock, Disco
- Occupation(s): Vocalist, musician, songwriter
- Instrument(s): Keyboards, Guitar
- Years active: 2007 – present

Vlatko "Lozano" Lozanoski (Macedonian: Влатко "Лозано" Лозаноски; born 27 June 1985) is a Macedonian singer. Together with Esma Redžepova, he represented Macedonia in the Eurovision Song Contest 2013 in Malmö, Sweden.

== Career ==
His first public appearance was as a participant in the talent show Mak Dzvezdi (September 2007 - May 2008). A month later, he won the Grand Prix on the first Macedonian Radio Festival called Starry Night (Macedonian: Ѕвездена Ноќ). He sang the song "Vrati Me" which was also his first official single. His second single was called "Obicen Bez Tebe". In October 2008, singing his only third official single at the time "Vremeto Da Zastane", Lozano was awarded by the jury the Debut Prize at MakFest, the most prestigious music festival in Republic of Macedonia. Two days later, on the final evening he won the MakFest Grand Prix which was awarded by the audience. "Sonce Ne Me Gree" was his next single. In February 2009, he participated in Macedonia's national selection for the Eurovision Song Contest 2009 singing his fifth single "Blisku Do Mene" and was placed fourth. The song was elected to represent Macedonia on The Virtual Eurosong Festival "Second Chance". In June 2009 Lozano participated on the Pjesma Mediterana Festival in Budva, Montenegro. In July, he participated on the Slavianski Bazar Festival in Vitebsk, Belarus and won the second prize. Next, Lozano performed "I'm Your Angel" along with Magdalena Cvetkoska on the Golden Wings Festival in Moldova, and they won the second prize. He was also awarded the Best Male Voice. His first album named "Lozano" was released in early 2010. In February 2010 he participated in the Macedonian national selection for the Eurovision Song Contest 2010 singing "Letam kon tebe". He ended up in the fourth place.

In 2022, he performed his song "Kilometri" together with Macedonian singer Karolina Gočeva at the latter's New Year's Eve performance on Macedonian Radio Television (MRT). The live performance video was released on the singer's official YouTube channel on 26 July 2023.

== Eurovision Song Contest 2013 ==
On 28 December 2012, Macedonian Radio-Television (MRT) announced that Lozanoski along with Esma Redžepova would represent Macedonia in the Eurovision Song Contest 2013 to be held in Malmö, Sweden, with the song "Pred da se razdeni". The song failed to qualify from the second semi-final of the competition on 16 May 2013, placing 16th in the field of 17 songs, scoring 28 points.

== Discography ==
=== Albums ===
- Lozano (2010)
- Preku sedum morinja (2012)
- Deset (2018)

=== Events and awards ===
- Zvezdena Noḱ Radiski Festival, Ohrid, Macedonia (2008) – Grand Prix
- MakFest, Štip, Macedonia (2008) – Grand Prix and Best debut
- Skopje Fest 2009 – 4th place
- Pjesma Mediterana, Budva, Montenegro (2009)
- Slavianski Bazaar in Vitebsk, Vitebsk, Belarus (2009) – 2nd place
- Golden Wings, Chișinău, Moldova (2009) – 2nd place and Best Male Vocalist
- MARS Radiski Festival, Skopje, Macedonia (2009) – Most Listened Song on Radio Stations and most listened song of the audience in Macedonia
- Skopje Fest 2010 – 4th Place
- Sea Songs, Sevastopol, Ukraine (2010) – 4th Place

== See also ==
- Music of the Republic of Macedonia

Awards and achievements
Preceded by Kaliopi with "Crno i belo"	Macedonia in the Eurovision Song Contest with Esma Redžepova; 2013	Succeeded by Tijana with "To the Sky"
