= Rusinka =

Song performed by Vlatko Ilievski

Single by Vlatko Ilievski

from the album Neka bide po tvoe
- Released: February 27, 2011
- Recorded: 2010
- Genre: Pop
- Length: 3:00
- Label: Plan B
- Songwriter(s): Grigor Koprov, Vladimir Dojčinovski, Jovan Jovanov, Marko Marinković
- Producer(s): Grigor Koprov

Vlatko Ilievski singles chronology
"Pred da te znam" (2010)	"Rusinka" (2011)	"Moja tamna rijeko" (2011)

Eurovision Song Contest 2011 entry
- Country: Macedonia
- Artist(s): Vlatko Ilievski
- Languages: Macedonian, English ^{1}
- Composer(s): Grigor Koprov, Vladimir Dojčinovski
- Lyricist(s): Jovan Jovanov, Marko Marinković

Finals performance
- Semi-final result: 16th
- Semi-final points: 36

Entry chronology
- ◄ "Jas ja imam silata" (2010)
- "Crno i belo" (2012) ►

"Rusinka" (Macedonian: Русинкa, English: Russian Girl) is a song performed by Macedonian singer Vlatko Ilievski. The song represented Macedonia in the Eurovision Song Contest 2011 in Düsseldorf, Germany, but it failed to qualify in the final. For first time it was performed on Skopje Fest 2011, together with nineteen other songs, and won the first place, from both jury and the public votes.

Apart from the Macedonian version of the song, the song was also released in three other languages: English, Russian and Serbo-Croatian. It was later confirmed that Vlatko will sing the song originally in Macedonian. The music video for the song premiered on March 17, 2011. It was directed by Boško Stolić and filmed in HD.

== Background ==
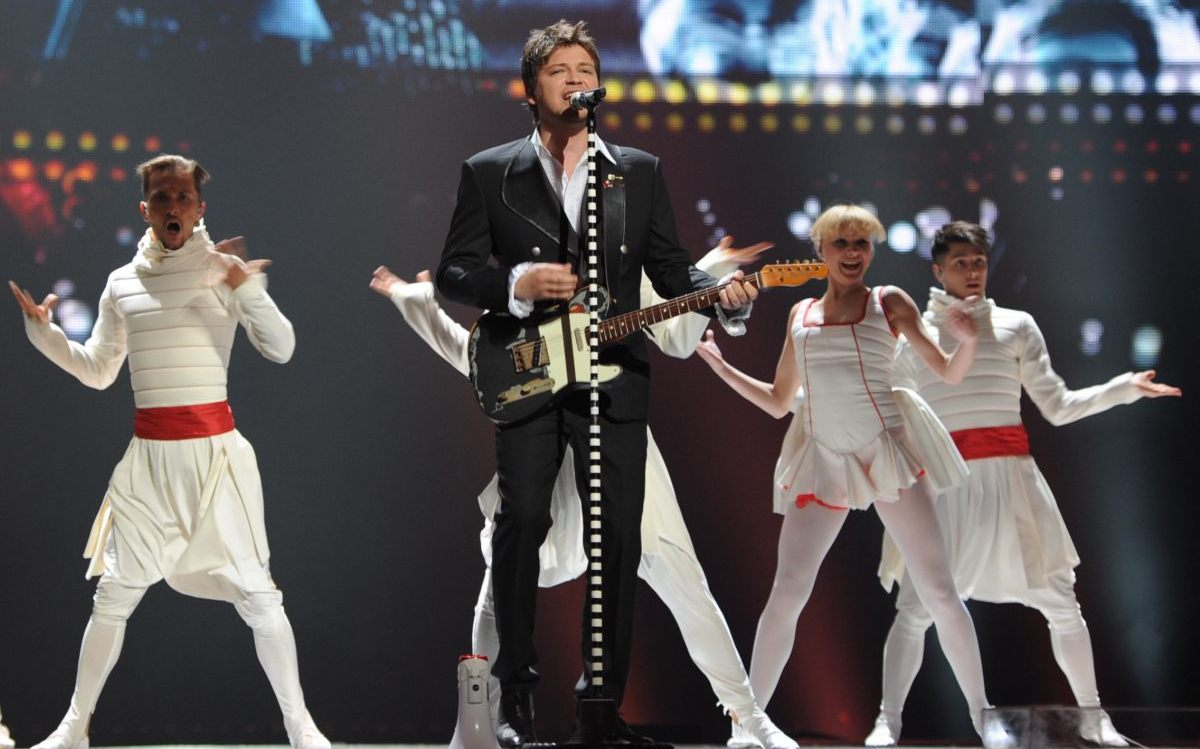
Vlatko Ilievski performing the song on the Eurovision Song Contest 2011

=== Production history ===
"Rusinka" was composed by Grigor Koprov, Vladimir Dojčinovski - Dojčin, Jovan Jovanov, while the lyrics were written by Marko Marinkovic - Slatkar. The music incorporates modern music style mixed with traditional Russian music. The lyrics are about a Macedonian boy who fells in love with a Russian girl, saying that he doesn't understand a word she is saying, but he would learn the Russian language just for her. The traditional drinks of both countries (Macedonia and Russia) vodka and rakija are mentioned in the text.

Apart from the Macedonian version of the song, the song was also released in three other languages: English ("Russian Girl"), Russian ("Русская девушка") and Serbo-Croatian ("Ruskinja" ("Рускиња")). However, the song was performed in its original Macedonian version containing one phrase in Russian.

== Skopje Fest 2011 ==
The song for the first time was performed on February 27, 2011 on Skopje Fest 2011 as nineteen out of twenty songs. At the end it came up first as a winner with both 12 points from the public votes and the jury consisted from 10 notable members.

== Music video ==
The video for the song premiered on March 17, 2011 on the official Eurovision Song Contest website on YouTube, eurovision.tv. The filming of the video lasted 12 hours and it was filmed in one frame without a montage. The video includes a cast of 12 performers featuring the Macedonian fashion model Elena Trajanovska. She is best known as the only Macedonian selected at the casting for new models in the fashion agency "Woman in Milan". The video was filmed in HD by director Boško Stolić. Four alternate videos were filmed, for each version of the song.

== At Eurovision Song Contest 2011 ==
The song was performed in the second semi-final of the Eurovision Song Contest 2011 in Düsseldorf, Germany, but it failed to enter in the final.

== Notes ==
1. Includes one phrase in Russian: Подруга ваша, ла которой я люблю танцевать, моя девушка, девушка блондинка, которой я люблю! It means: "Your friend, whom I love to dance with, my girlfriend, the blonde girl whom I love!"
