= International Federation of Festival Organizations =

Former global organization

The Fédération Internationale des Organisations de Festivals (FIDOF, "International Federation of Festival Organizations") was an organization to hold and organize festivals worldwide. It was established in 1966, and headquartered in Split, Yugoslavia with Secretary General professor Armando Moreno. Later, it was headquartered in California, United States, where it was registered as a Section 501(c) non-profit organization. It was the member of the U.S. National Music Council. The organization ceased to exist in 2005 after the death of its founder.

The main role of FIDOF was to provide coordination of festivals and other cultural events through arranging their dates and publicizing them through the International English Monthly Bulletins, which were distributed among the members.

FIDOF had 220 individual members and more than 1,000 affiliated organizations. It was also associated with 320 festivals held in 72 countries. FIDOF participated in the organization of festivals mainly in the countries of Eastern Europe, Asia, Africa, Latin America and was a member of the International Music Council of UNESCO. The FIDOF Directorate included show business figures from the USA, Germany, Egypt, Italy, Kazakhstan, Lithuania, Malta, Turkey, Sweden, Japan and others.

FIDOF awarded outstanding performers with diplomas. In addition, the organization has established a special Distant accord award, awarded for contributions to the music industry, to festival organizers.

== FIDOF members ==
- Slavianski Bazaar in Vitebsk (since 1998)
- MakFest
- Voice of Asia
- Splitski festival (Split song festival) (since 1966.)
