= Vladimir Petrovski =

Macedonian rock singer

- Also known as: Karter
- Born: 1962 or 1963 (age 62–63)
- Origin: Skopje, North Macedonia (then Socialist Federal Republic of Yugoslavia)
- Genres: Punk rock Pop rock Alternative rock Progressive rock
- Instruments: Vocals, guitar
- Years active: 1978–present
- Labels: MAK Rekords; Jugoton; Makoton; Stotrojka

Vladimir Petrovski (Macedonian: Владимир Петровски' [ˈvɫadimir pɛtrɔfski]; born c. 1962/63), better known by his nickname "Karter", is a Macedonian musician and founder of the bands Saraceni, Badmingtons, Aleksandar Makedonski and Opstrukcija.

== Early history ==
Petrovski started playing guitar in Fol Jazik, Macedonia's first punk band. In 1978 he began to learn about sound engineering. In 1981, he founded the punk band Saraceni. Their best known song, "Ne brini" (Don't Worry) was released on Makedonski Dokument 2. In 1983, he started up Badmingtons with Dejan Shkartov and Boris Georgiev.

In 1986, to follow the then recent trend of punk bands becoming pop bands, Badmingtons fired Georgiev, recruited the female vocalist Melita Stefanovska, the drummer Vladimir Dimovski and the bassist Zoran Jankovic. They then changed their sound to pop rock and changed their name to Aleksandar Makedonski. The first Aleksandar Makedonski album was in Serbian. In 1995, Aleksandar Makedonski changed their style to one reminiscent of Badmingtons (most noticeable on the songs "Ako mi dadesh" and "Ubav den") but still with traces of pop-rock and let Georgiev back in the band. Stefanovska and Dimovski had left by then. The album Moeto carstvo was released in 1996, but shortly after, the band split up so Petrovski could concentrate on his film company, Karter Film. Karter Film had previously shot a music video for "Ubav den", of which a snippet is available from Badmingtons' MySpace.

In 1999, Petrovsku started a prog rock band called Opstrukcija, which released the album Sistem. Karter Film shot a video for the song "Odam", which is partially available from MySpace. The full version of Odam (the song) was available on the Karter Film site when it was still on GeoCities before its shutdown and has since been made available again by a fan.

He is currently concentrating on Karter Film.

== Discography ==
- Posle mene shto ti e gajle (1985)
- Za heroje i princeze (1988)
- Moeto carstvo (1996)
- Sistem (1999)
- Kolektorska edicija (2007, compilation of remastered Opstrukcija and Aleksandar Makedonski tracks)
- "Ako mi dadesh" (2007)
- A limited edition vinyl will be released by Höhnie Records in 2013 containing rare Saraceni and Badmingtons tracks.
