= Vodolija =

Macedonian rock band

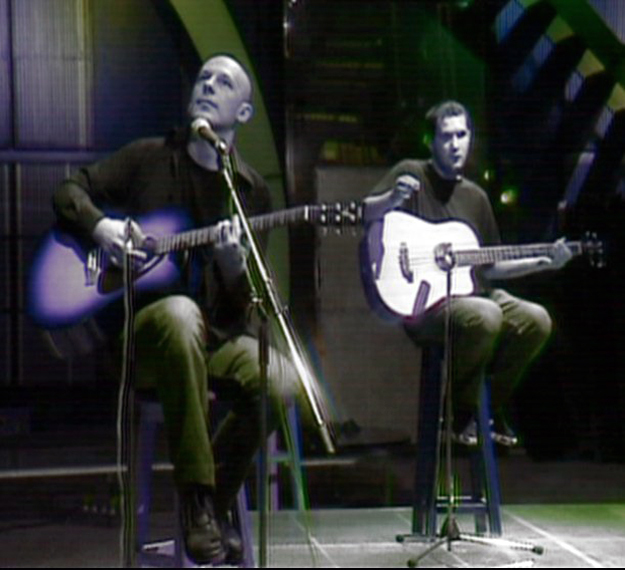

Background information
- Origin: Skopje, Republic of Macedonia
- Genres: Rock, alternative rock
- Years active: 1991–1998; 2005–Present

Vodolija (Cyrillic::Водолија; English translation:Aquarius) is a Macedonian rock band formed in 1989 that officially started in 1991 when they had their first official appearance on Pop-Rock Fest 1991 and recorded the first official single in the studio M2 of the Macedonian Radio Television. They released three studio albums and participated three times in the Macedonian Eurovision Song Contest 2009 with the song (Mojot TV), Macedonian Eurovision Song Contest 2010 with the song (Solza) and Macedonian Eurovision Song Contest 2011 with the song (Ne vrakaj se). The first two albums of Vodolija were recorded in the studio of Vladimir Petrovski-Karter from Badmingtons. The third album was recorded in Risto Apostolov studio.

In 2008/2009 the frontman of Vodolija Risto Apostolov collaborated with Sonia Sauruk from New Jersey for "Best of your love" and "Summertime". "Summertime" is on their third album. In June 2010 Vodolija held an acoustic concert on Macedonian Public Television MTV. The concert was broadcast in October 2010. All songs of Vodolija were composed and written by frontman and guitarist Risto Apostolov. In November 2011 they get the prize for best production for "Ti ne si".

In August 2013 they participated in Ohrid Fest festival with "Radost i bol" in pop and International night of festival. It was composed by Risto Apostolov. In 2015 Vodolija's "Se sto mi treba" is part of the Where is the money soundtrack and frontman of the band Risto Apostolov guest starred in the movie.

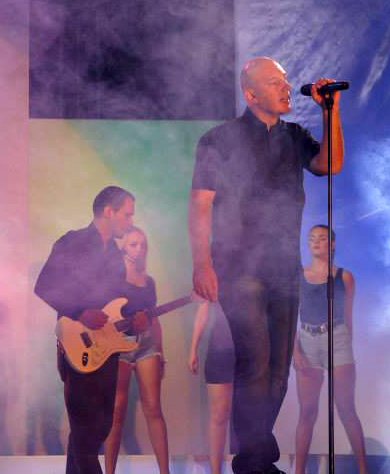
Vodolija on Ohrid Fest 2013

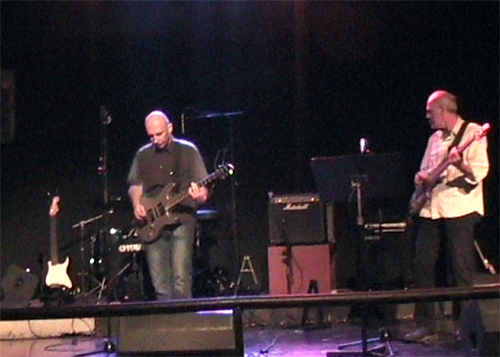
Vodolija 2014

== Discography ==
=== Singles ===
- "Izmislen od Bajki" (2006)
- "Ti ne si" (2007)
- "Sekavanja" (2008)
- "Mojot TV" (2009)
- "Solza" (2010)
- "Ne vrakaj se" (2011)
- "Radost i bol" (2013)
- "Kako od bajki" (2015)
- "Se sto mi treba" (2015)
- "Odam napred" (2015)
- "Koga i kako" (2016)
- "Ljubovna pesna" (2017)
- "Samo eden" (2019)
- "Polna so magija (2020)
- "Strast (2022)
- "Povedi me (2023)
- "Nebesen svod (2024)

=== Albums ===
- Ljubov ili Strasti (1996)
- Hazard (1997)
- Se sto e sveto (2009)
- Vodolija - Kolekcija na singlovi - 2025 - Digital release
