= Nešto što kje ostane =

2009 song performed by Next Time

Single by Next Time

from the album Na krajot od denot
- Released: February 19, 2009
- Recorded: 2008–2009
- Genre: Pop; Rock
- Length: 2:59
- Label: Jovanov Records
- Composers: Damjan Lazarov; Jovan Jovanov
- Lyricist: Elvir Mekić
- Producers: Jovan Jovanov; Damjan Lazarov

Next Time singles chronology
"Caruso" (2008)	"Nešto što kje ostane" (2009)	"Milion" (2009)

Eurovision Song Contest 2009 entry
- Country: North Macedonia
- Artists: Stefan Filipovski; Martin Filipovski
- As: Next Time
- Language: Macedonian
- Composers: Damjan Lazarov; Jovan Jovanov
- Lyricist: Elvir Mekić

Finals performance
- Semi-final result: 10th
- Semi-final points: 45

Entry chronology
- ◄ "Let Me Love You" (2008)
- "Jas ja imam silata" (2010) ►

Official performance video
- "Nešto što kje ostane" on YouTube

"Nešto što kje ostane" (Macedonian: Нешто што ќе остане; English: "Something that will remain") is a song by the Macedonian band Next Time. It was the Macedonian entry at the Eurovision Song Contest 2009 in Moscow, Russia, but it failed to qualify for the final round. The English version of the song is titled "The Sweetest Thing That Will Remain".

== Background ==
=== Production history ===
The song was composed by Macedonian composer and singer Jovan Jovanov together with the help of Damjan Lazarov, and the lyrics were written by Elvir Mekić.

After the winning the Macedonian national final, the composer changed the song's arrangement making it more rock than it was at the national selection. Two more versions of the song: an English and Serbo-Croatian version were produced under the names "The Sweetest Thing That Will Remain" and "Ne dam da te diraju" respectively. The lyrics of the English version are by Lazarov, while those of the Serbo-Croatian are by Mekic. It was decided that the song would be sung in its original Macedonian at Eurovision.

== Skopje Fest 2009 ==
The song was presented in the first semi-final on February 19 and finished first with 22 points (12 from the televote and 10 from the jury). In the final, Next Time performed sixth and won the competition with 19 points (12 from the televote and 7 from the jury).

== Music video ==
The Filipovskis in the video for "Nešto što kje ostane"

The music video of the song was filmed by its composer Jovan Jovanov and was edited by "Exit B" Production. It was filmed on the 28 and 29 March in many locations in Skopje: on a big tower, outside of the city, and in a production studio. In the video-story one of the members of the band, Stefan, is falling in love with the director in the music video symbolizing her as "something that will remain" or nesto sto kje ostane. A version of the video was released for each language the song had been recorded in.

== Live performances ==
In a retrospective 2024 review for Sloboden Pečat, During the performance, Katerina Stevovska described their performance on the Eurovision stage as "interesting".
