= Risto Apostolov =

Macedonian rock singer

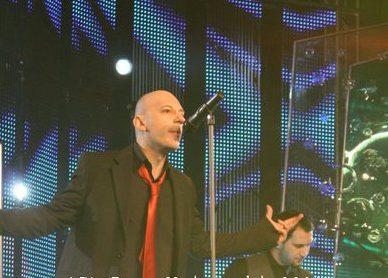
- Apostolov in 2011

Background information
- Born: Skopje, SR Macedonia, SFR Yugoslavia
- Genres: Rock; alternative rock; pop rock
- Occupations: Singer; songwriter; producer
- Instruments: Vocals; guitar; bass guitar; keyboards; drums
- Years active: 1990–present
- Member of: Vodolija

Risto Apostolov (Cyrillic: Ристо Апостолов) is a Macedonian songwriter, composer, and music producer. He is also guitarist, singer, and leader of rock band Vodolija.

== Career ==
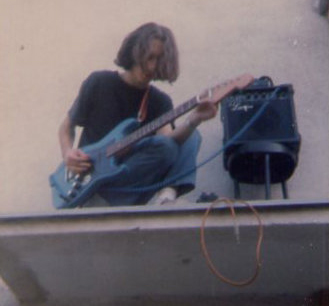
Risto Apostolov from rock band Vodolija in 1991

As a composer and performer with his band Vodolija, he participated at the Eurovision Song Contest 2009 with the song "Mojot TV", 2010 with the song "Solza", and 2011 with the song "Ne vrakaj se". He is also the producer and arranger of Rok Agresori's song "Ding Dong" which was performed at Eurovision 2009.

He has released three studio albums with his band Vodolija. The first two albums were recorded in the studio of Vladimir Petrovski-Karter from Badmingtons. The third album was recorded in his own studio

In June 2010, with his band Vodolija, he held acoustic concert on Macedonian Public Television MTV. The concert was broadcast in October 2010.

In 2008/2009, he recorded duets with Sonia Sauruk from New Jersey for the songs "Best of Your Love" and "Summertime". "Summertime" is on the third album of Vodolija. In November 2011, he received the prize for best production for the song of Vodolija "Ti ne si".

In 2012, with his band Vodolija, he represented Macedonia on INFE VISION network contest organised by (International Network of Fanclubs of Eurovision (I.N.F.E.) with song "Mojot TV".

In August 2013, with his band Vodolija, he participated in the Ohrid Fest festival with the song "Radost i bol" in Pop and International night of festival. He is also composer that song.

He also composes music and makes arrangements for other artists and solo singers.

In 2015 as a guest star, he starred in the film Where Is the Money and his song "Se sto mi treba" is part of the movie soundtrack.

== Discography ==
Singles with Vodolija

- Nebesen svod - 2024
- Povedi me - 2023
- Strast - 2022
- Polna so magija - 2020
- Samo eden - 2019
- Ljubovna pesna - 2017
- Koga i kako - 2016
- Odam napred - 2015
- Se sto mi treba - 2015
- Kako od bajki - 2015
- Radost i bol - 2013
- Ne vrakaj se - 2011
- Solza - 2010
- Mojot TV - 2009
- Sekavanja - 2008
- Ti ne si - 2007
- Izmislen od Bajki - 2006

Albums with Vodolija

- Vodolija - Kolekcija na singlovi - 2025 - Digital release
- Se sto e sveto -2009/2010 - CD
- Hazard - 1997/1998 - Cassette/CD
- Ljubov ili Strasti - 1996-Cassette
