= MakFest =

North Macedonian music festival

MakFest (Macedonian: МакФест) founded in 1986, is the largest festival of Macedonian popular music. It is held every year in November, in Štip, Republic of Macedonia, at the Cultural Center "Aco Šopov" (Macedonian: Дом на Културата "Ацо Шопов"). MakFest is a member of FIDOF (International Federation of Festival Organizations) with headquarters in Los Angeles, CA, USA. In 1997, MakFest was awarded the "Festival of The Year" distinction by FIDOF.

== Winners ==
| Year | Performer | Song | English title |
|---|---|---|---|
| 1986 | Helena Blagne | "Кога те нема" | When You're Gone |
| 1987 | Trajche Manev | "Осамен" | Lonely |
| 1988 | Kićo Slabinac | "Не враќај се, не буди ме" | Don't Return, Don't Wake Me Up |
| 1989 | Zorica Kondza | "А Бог знае" | God Knows |
| 1990 | Ljupka Dimitrovska | "Ѕвона ѕвонат" | Bells are Ringing |
| 1991 | Pop Dizajn | "Дајте ги рацете" | Raise Your Hands |
| 1992 | Olgica Hristovska | "Свирете ја Зајди, зајди" | Play "Zajdi, Zajdi" |
| 1993 | Tanja Kocovska | "Твојте очи, сине" | Your Eyes, My Son |
| 1994 | Vlado Janevski | "Еден бакнеж" | One Kiss |
| 1995 | Cvetanka Gligorova | "Не биди слеп" | Don't Be Blind |
| 1996 | Dule i Koki | "Виолина и гитара" | Violin and Guitar |
| 1997 | Risto Samardžiev | "Таму кај што си" | There Where You Are |
| 1998 | Magija | "Магија" | Magic |
| 1999 | Risto Samardžiev | "Песна за љубовта" | Song About Love |
| 2000 | Andrijana Janevska & Marjan Stojanovski | "Љубов ти е адреса" | Your Address is Love |
| 2001 | Blagica Pop-Tomova | "Зрак" | Ray |
| 2002 | Biba Dodeva | "Кажи љубов" | Say Love |
| 2003 | Bojana Atanasovska | "Немам одбрана" | I Don't Have Defense |
| 2004 | Aleksandra Pileva | "Нема утеха" | No Consolation |
| 2005 | Jovan Jovanov & Maja Sazdanovska | "Ти ме сакаш, знам" | You Love Me, I Know |
| 2006 | Tamara Todevska & Vrčak | "Седмо небо" | Seventh Sky |
| 2007 | Risto Samardžiev & Irena Krstevska | "Се е исто како лани" | Everything's the Same Like Last Year |
| 2008 | Vlatko Lozanoski | "Времето да застане" | The Time Should Stop |
| 2009 | Risto Samardžiev & Dule i Koki | "За милион години" | For Million Years |
| 2010 | Lambe Alabakovski | "Не планирам" | I Don't Plan |
| 2011 | Zoran Iliev | "Ангели и демони" | Angels and Demons |
| 2012 | Sara Markovska | "После него" | After Him |
| 2013 | Aleksandra Janeva | "Врати ми го сонцето" | Return Me the Sun |
| 2014 | Biba Dodeva | "Врати се" | Come Back |
| 2015 | Bojana Atanasovska | "Диви цветови" | Wild Flowers |
| 2016 | Aleksandra Janeva | "За сто години" | For Hundred Years |
| 2017 | Zoran Iliev & Anabela Atijas | "Од утро до вечер" | From Morning 'till Evening |
| 2018 | Antonia Gigovska | "Никогаш не вели никогаш" | Never Say Never |
| 2019 | Martinijan Kirilovski | "Сто пати на ден" | Hundred Times a Day |
| 2020 | Nokaut | "Сакам да живеам" | I Want to Live |
| 2021 | Aleksandar Todorovski | "Под исто небо" | Under the Same Sky |
| 2022 | Pajak & Lara Ivanova | "Bella" | Beautiful |
| 2023 | Tasko and Malena | "Сафир" | Sapphire |
| 2024 | Antonia Gigovska | "Жена" | Woman |
| 2025 | Lara Ivanova | "Доминантен" | Dominant |
| 2026 | TBA 2027 (Note: An award for the most listened song will be presented at the next edition.) | | |
