= Jovan Jovanov =

Macedonian-Canadian music producer and songwriter

Jovan Jovanov Јован Јованов
- Also known as: Jay Jay
- Born: May 27, 1981 (age 44); Skopje, SR Macedonia, SFR Yugoslavia (present-day North Macedonia)
- Origin: North Macedonia
- Genres: pop; R&B; pop-rock; dance; hip hop
- Occupations: Songwriter, music producer, audio engineer, singer
- Years active: 1998–present
- Labels: Global Music Entertainment, Jovanov Records
- Website: www.jovanjovanov.com

Jovan Jovanov (Macedonian: Јован Јованов) is a Macedonian-Canadian music producer, record engineer and songwriter of pop, R&B, house, and hip-hop. Now based in Toronto, Ontario, Jovanov is working with Canadian artists such as Alx Veliz, NorthSideBenji, Liron, and many others. Macedonian audience knows Jovanov as a singer and composer of many hit songs performed by artists such a Toše Proeski, Elvir Mekic, Adrian Gaxha, Слаткаристика, Toni Zen, Next Time and many others. Jovanov has composed, written, and produced over 700 songs and received many awards and acknowledgments. Internationally his hits have over 200 million views on YouTube.

He represented Macedonia as songwriter on the Eurovision song contest in 2004 (song "Life" for Toše Proeski) and in 2009 (song "Nešto što ḱe ostane" for Next Time), and on the Junior Eurovision Song Contest in 2008 (song "Prati Mi SMS" for Bobi Andonov). He also arranged Vlatko Ilievski's song for the Eurovision Song Contest 2011.

Jovanov has won three first prizes on the Macedonian festival MakFest, with his compositions "Magija", performed by the music group Magija (1998), "Ti me sakash", performed by Jovan Jovanov and Maja Sazdanovska (2005), and "Ne planiram", performed by Lambe Alabakovski (2010). He has also won two second prizes on MakFest for the compositions "300 godini", performed by Adrian Gaxha (2005) and "Bez tebe tivko umiram", performed by Next time (2008). Moreover, he is the winner of third prizes for the compositions "Da te vidam pak", performed by Jovan Jovanov (2003), "Se na svoe mesto", performed by Zoran Stamenkovski (2006) and "Nekade posle 2" performed by Elvir Mekic (2007).

== Early life ==
Jovanov was born in Skopje . He began his music education when he was six years old. He plays the piano, guitar, and percussion instruments.

== Career ==
=== Artist Career (2004-2009) ===
Jovanov recorded and released two CDs, "Na moj Nacin" (May Way), "Into mi trebas" (I need You Immediately) and performed in numerous concerts and performances around Macedonia.

=== Festival Director Makfest (2011-2012) ===
Jovanov was for two years director of the biggest festival of pop music in Macedonia - "MakFest" held in Stip. Makfest has produced more than 1,000 songs, many of which were hits.

=== Global Music Entertainment Corp - Toronto, Canada (2017–present) ===
The G.M.E. was founded by Award Winning Producer Jovan Jovanov. Global Music Entertainment has a team of expert industry professionals and has a blueprint plan for an aspiring singer to break into the music industry as an independent or signed recording artist.

The G.M.E. is an all-in-one artist development facility that prepares singers for a career in the music business. It is the leading source of training for artists in the music industry in Toronto, and a model for industry training nationwide. The center provides artist development programs, A & R consultations, marketing, social media and branding assistance, a recording studio, master vocal classes, performance and stage training, choreographers, songwriting, and music lessons.

Global Music Entertainment Corp is owner of Global Recording Studio Toronto

== Discography ==
=== Awards and nominations ===
Year	Award	Category	Work	Result	Ref.
2021	Ontario International Film Festival(ONIFF)	Best Music For Canadian Feature / The Petrichor Movie	(songwriter & producer)	Won	
2021	Hollywood Music in Media Awards	Production / Warzone	(songwriter & producer)	Won	
2020	American Golden Picture	Best Composer / The Petrichor Movie	(songwriter & producer)	Won	
2020	Hollywood Music in Media Awards	Production / My Love	(songwriter & producer)	Nominated	
2020	Juno Awards	Children's Album of the Year / This is us	(songwriter & producer)	Nominated	
2020	Venice Film Awards	Best Original Song	(songwriter & producer)	Won	
2019	Hollywood Music in Media Awards	Best R&B/ Soul / Machine Gun	(songwriter & producer)	Nominated	
2016	The USA Songwriting Competition	HONORABLE MENTION AWARDS	(Songwriter & producer)	Won	

=== Awards ===
Year	Award	Category	Work	Ref. !
1998	MakFest First prize	Аudience award	Song Magija (singer, songwriter & producer)	
2000	Golden Ladybug of Popularity	Bend of the year	Bend Magija (singer)	
2003	MakFest Third prize	Аudience award	Song Da te vidam pak (singer, songwriter & producer)	
2004	North Macedonia in the Eurovision Song Contest Winner	The Best Song	"Life"Tose Proeski (songwriter & producer)	
2004	Sunčane Skale Third prize	Аudience award	Edinstvena (songwriter & producer)	
2005	MakFest First prize	Audience Award	Ti Me Sakas Znam (Songwriter & producer)	
2005	MakFest Second prize	Audience Award	300 Godini Adrian Gaxha (Singer, songwriter & producer)	
2006	MakFest Third prize	Audience Award	Se na svoe mesto (Songwriter & producer)	
2007	MakFest Third prize	Audience Award	Nekade Posle 2 Elvir Mekic (Songwriter & producer)	
2008	MARS Macedonia	Radio Hit of the year	Me ostavi sam da ziveam Next Time (Songwriter & producer)	
2009	North Macedonia in the Eurovision Song Contest Winner	The Best Song	Nešto što kje ostaneNext Time (songwriter & producer)	
2010	MakFest First prize	Audience Award	Ne PlaniramLambe Alabakoski (songwriter & producer)	
2011	North Macedonia in the Eurovision Song Contest Winner	The Best Song	RusinkaVlatko Ilievski (songwriter & producer)	
2011	Sunčane Skale Third prize	Аudience award	Lazem Ljude (songwriter & producer)	
2013	MARS Macedonia	Radio Hit of the year	RegetonTyzee (Songwriter & producer)	
2015	MARS Macedonia	Male Artist	Sakam NesakamAleksandar Tarabunov (Songwriter & producer)	
2018	Valandovo Second prize	Audience Award	Umiram Po TebeKiril Bozinovski (songwriter & producer)	
