= Liron =

Liron is a Hebrew gender-neutral given name meaning "my joy" or "my song". It is also an Albanian masculine given name meaning "freeing" or "free" (the feminine form is Lirona). The name may refer to:

== People ==
=== Given name ===
- Liron Bezalel (born 1972), International businessman
- Liron Basis (born 1974), Israeli football player
- Liron Diamant (born 1990), Israeli football player
- Liron Vilner (born 1979), Israeli football player
- Liron Zarko (born 1981), Israeli football player
- Liron Pantanowitz, American pathologist

=== Surname ===
- Ludovic Liron (born 1978), French football player
