= Antonia Gigovska =

Macedonian pop singer

- Антониа Гиговска
- Born: 21 January 2001 (age 25); Skopje, North Macedonia
- Occupation: Singer
- Spouse: Robert Spasencoski
- Children: 1

Antonia Gigovska (Macedonian: Антониа Гиговска; born 21 January 2001) is a Macedonian pop singer. She was mentored musically by the professor Ana Kostadinovska.

In 2018, she was a contestant at the fiftieth edition of the Golden Stag Festival in Romania where she finished second. She provided backing vocals on songs by Jelena Rozga and Tamara Todevska, serving as a backing vocalist for the latter's representation of North Macedonia at the Eurovision Song Contest 2019.

She was a participant in the Serbian show Pinkove Zvezdice where she obtained the seventh place.

== Private life ==
She is married to musician Robert Spasencoski, whom she has one son with born in 2023.
