= Risto Samardžiev =

Macedonian singer and songwriter

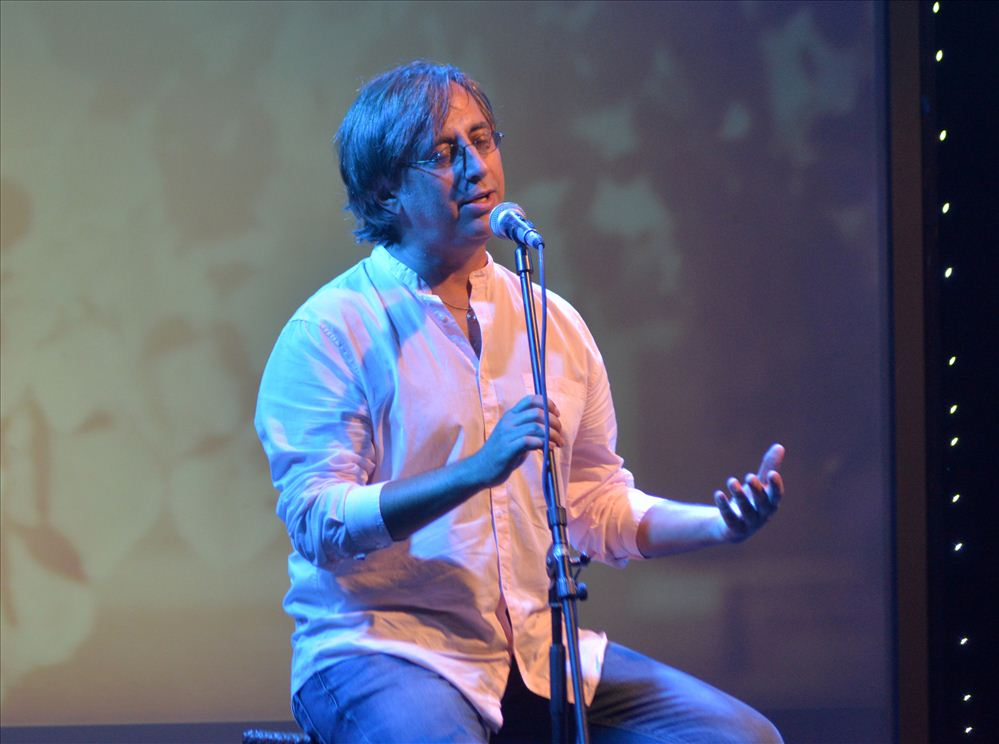
Risto Samardžiev in 2017

Risto Samardžiev (Macedonian: Ристо Самарџиев; born 17 August 1964 in Skopje) is a Macedonian singer and songwriter. He started his musical career when he was 16 years old. He formed the Cilindar group in 1981, which was one of the first New Wave rock bands in the Socialist Republic of Macedonia. He was also the frontman of New Romantic group Haos in Laos.

In 1987 he was invited to perform on MakFest, the largest music festival in the country. The song he performed, Čili Vili (Чили Вили) then became a hit in Macedonia. After that performance he continued to work independently, appearing in festivals as well as in bands (such as Memorija.) He has won MakFest four times as a performer, and has also written songs for other singers. In 2009 he won the pop night of Ohrid Fest in a duet with Vlatko Ilievski titled 'Za ljubov se pee do kraj.' He has also participated multiple times at the Macedonian national preselections for the Eurovision Song Contest.
