= Grigor Koprov =

Grigor Koprov Григор Копров
- Born: 30 September 1943 (age 83); Ohrid, Kingdom of Bulgaria
- Genre: Pop
- Occupation: Composer
- Years active: 1973-

Grigor Koprov (Macedonian: Григор Копров; born September 30, 1943) is a Macedonian pop music composer, who also had an important impact on the Yugoslav music scene. He has worked with many stars like Toše Proeski, Vlado Janevski, Marjan Stojanovski, Martin Vučić, Karolina Gočeva, Andrijana Janevska and Robert Vukelić

== Biography ==
Koprov was born on September 30, 1943, in Ohrid, Kingdom of Bulgaria. In 1997 he composed the song "Ne Zori Zoro" with which Vlado Janevski represented Republic of Macedonia at the Eurovision Song Contest 1998, the first contest for the Republic. Koprov has made many other attempts in the contest, with his songs failing to win the Macedonian National Final.

He is best known for his work with Macedonia's "Elvis" - Toše Proeski. Koprov composed Proeski's mega hits: "Sonce Vo Tvoite Rusi Kosi" ("The Sun in Your Golden Hair"), "Usni Na Usni" ("Lips on Lips"), and "Nemir" ("Restless," which was sung in duet with Karolina Gočeva).

He composed the music for the first ever Macedonian entry for Eurovision in Birmingham (UK) in 1998. The song "Ne zori, zoro" was performed in the finals by Vlado Janevski who himself wrote the lyrics.

He is also known as a composer for the famous Macedonian singer Maja Odžaklievska, with songs such as: "Julija," "Te ljubam ludo," "Niki," "Lidu lidu du," "Šila" and "Prosti mi."

Most recently, he wrote the song "Mojot Svet" which was a Macedonian entry performed by Karolina Gočeva at the Eurovision Song Contest 2007. He also composed a song ("Zastani, solzi izbrisi") for Aleksandar Belov.

He will also appear as a producer for Ana Petan's Splitski Festival 2025. entry: "Kad noć sretne dan".

== See also ==
- Music of the Republic of Macedonia
