= Vlado Janevski =

Macedonian singer (1960–2026)

Vlado Janevski Владо Јаневски
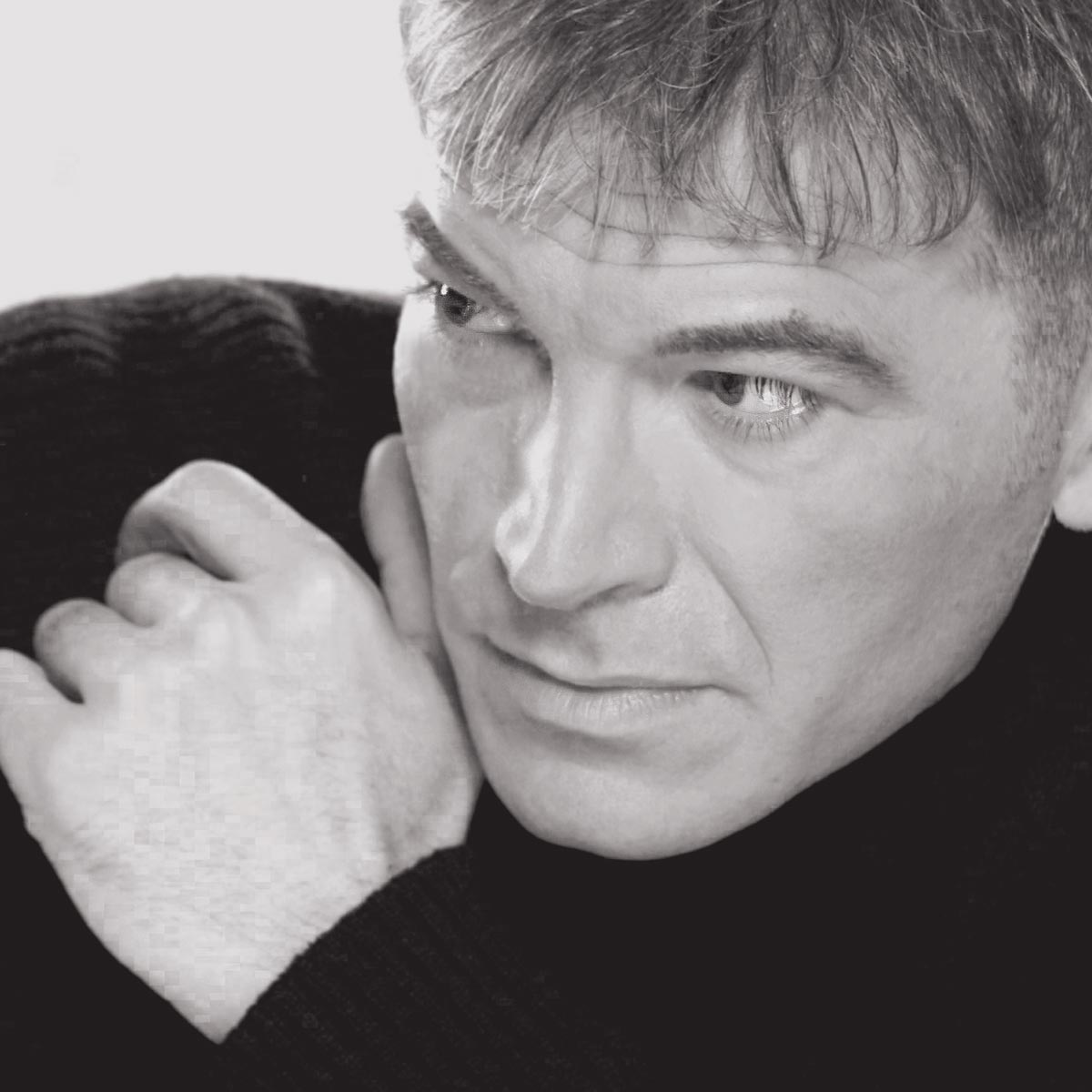

Background information
- Also known as: Vlado
- Born: Vladimir Janevski; 27 November 1960; Skopje, PR Macedonia, FPR Yugoslavia (present-day North Macedonia)
- Died: 28 June 2026 (aged 65) Skopje, North Macedonia
- Genres: Pop
- Occupations: Singer, lyricist, songwriter
- Instrument: Voice (baritone)
- Years active: 1991–2026
- Labels: Avalon Production (North Macedonia), Menart (Croatia)

Vladimir Vlado Janevski (Macedonian: Владимир Владо Јаневски [ˈvlaːdɔ ˈjanɛfski]; 27 November 1960 – 28 June 2026) was a Macedonian singer. He was North Macedonia's first Eurovision contestant, finishing 19th in Birmingham at the Eurovision Song Contest 1998 with the song "Ne Zori, Zoro".

== Life and career ==
Vlado Janevski was born on 27 November 1960 in Skopje, resided most of his adult years in Čair and as of 2021 moved to Gevgelija. He majored in English language and literature at the university of Ss. Cyril and Methodius. He was fluent in English, German, Italian and Russian. He played the guitar, piano and drums. He was a member of the popular bands Tost Sendvich (1976) and Bon-Ton (1986) as a drummer, and Fotomodel (1989) and Lastovica (1991-1992) as a singer.

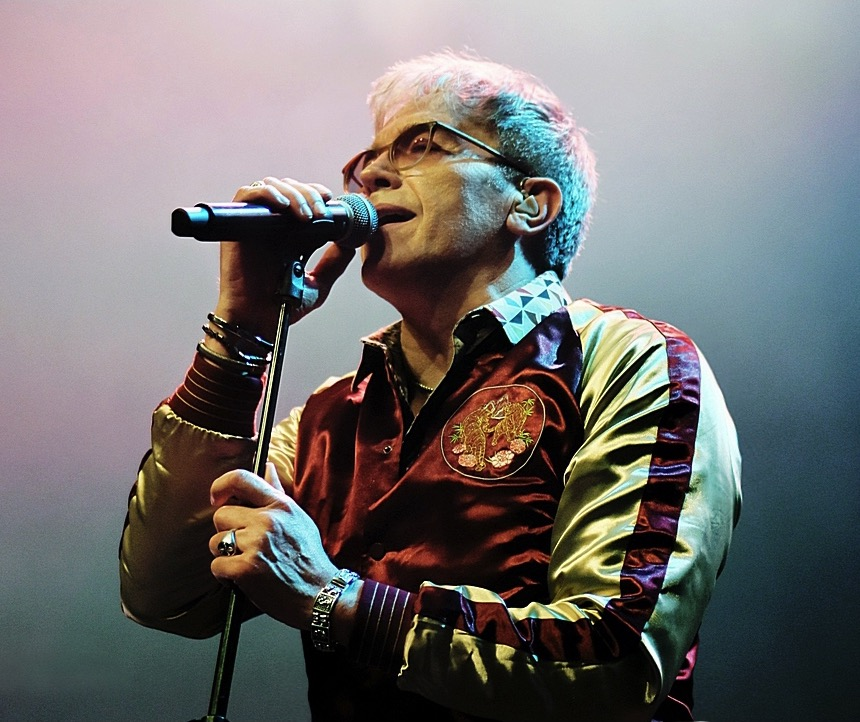
Vlado Janevski performing in concert at VIP Arena in Skopje, 2019

He participated in a number of festivals in Macedonia and other Ex-Yugoslav countries. He participated in Jugovizija in Belgrade in 1992 and also had revival participations in Belarus on Slavjanski Bazar in 1994, 1995 and 1996. In Macedonia, he took part in Interfest in 1994 where he got the grand prize, and on Makfest where got the second prize and the first in 1995. He took place in the first Skopje Fest 1998 with the song "Ne Zori, Zoro" and won the contest which allowed him to represent Macedonia for the first time in the Eurovision Song Contest 1998. Vlado Janevski was under an exclusive recording contract with Menart (Croatia) as of 2023.

Janevski died in Skopje after a short illness on 28 June 2026, at the age of 65. He was buried on 1 July at the Butel cemetery in Skopje.

== Eurovision 1998 ==
Vlado won the Skopje Fest in 1998 and he went to Birmingham where Macedonia debuted in the Eurovision Song Contest. The song Ne Zori, Zoro finished in 19th place and failed to qualify Macedonia for the Eurovision Song Contest 1999.

== Songwriting ==
From the beginning of his solo career, Vlado wrote most of the music and all the lyrics for his songs. Even though he was often referred to as "the most romantic songwriter and lyricist in the history of Macedonian popular music" he described himself as "a mere scribbler of love songs".

== Discography ==
=== Albums ===
- Parče Duša (1993)
- Se Najdobro (1996)
- Daleku E Neboto (1996)
- Ima Nešto Posilno Od Se (2002)
- Vakov Ili Takov (2004)
- Povtorno Se Zaljubuvam Vo Tebe (2006)

=== Singles ===
- 1998: Ne Zori, Zoro
- 2007: Zemjo Makedonska
- 2011: Bulki
- 2012: Pjer
- 2014: E, ama jas te sakam tebe
- 2016: Ajde vodi me
- 2017: Posledna zabluda
- 2018: Glaven grad na tagata
- 2019: Otkako si negova
- 2020: Nedostasuvaš
- 2020: Ljubi, ljubi
- 2021: Bez tebe ne me biva
- 2022: Nenormalen
- 2023: Zlatni godini
- 2024: Prekrasen den

== See also ==
- Music of North Macedonia

Awards and achievements
Preceded by None (first time entry)	Macedonia in the Eurovision Song Contest; 1998	Succeeded by XXL with "100% te ljubam"
