= Badmingtons =

Macedonian punk rock band

- Origin: Skopje, Republic of Macedonia
- Genres: Punk; Experimental rock
- Years active: 1983–1986, 2002, 2007
- Past members: Vladimir Petrovski-Karter (guitar, vocals); Dean Škartov-Deko (keyboards); Boris Georgiev-But (drums)
- Website: Badmintons on My Space

Badmingtons (Macedonian: Бадмингтонс) were a Macedonian punk rock band.

== History ==
Badmingtons were formed in 1983 in Skopje, then SR Macedonia (now the Republic of Macedonia) by Vladimir Petrovski - Karter (guitar and vocals), Dean Škartov - Deko (keyboards) and Boris Georgiev - But (drums).

== See also ==
- Music of the Republic of Macedonia
- Punk rock in Yugoslavia
- Popular music in the Socialist Federal Republic of Yugoslavia
