= Nena Leković =

Serbian singer

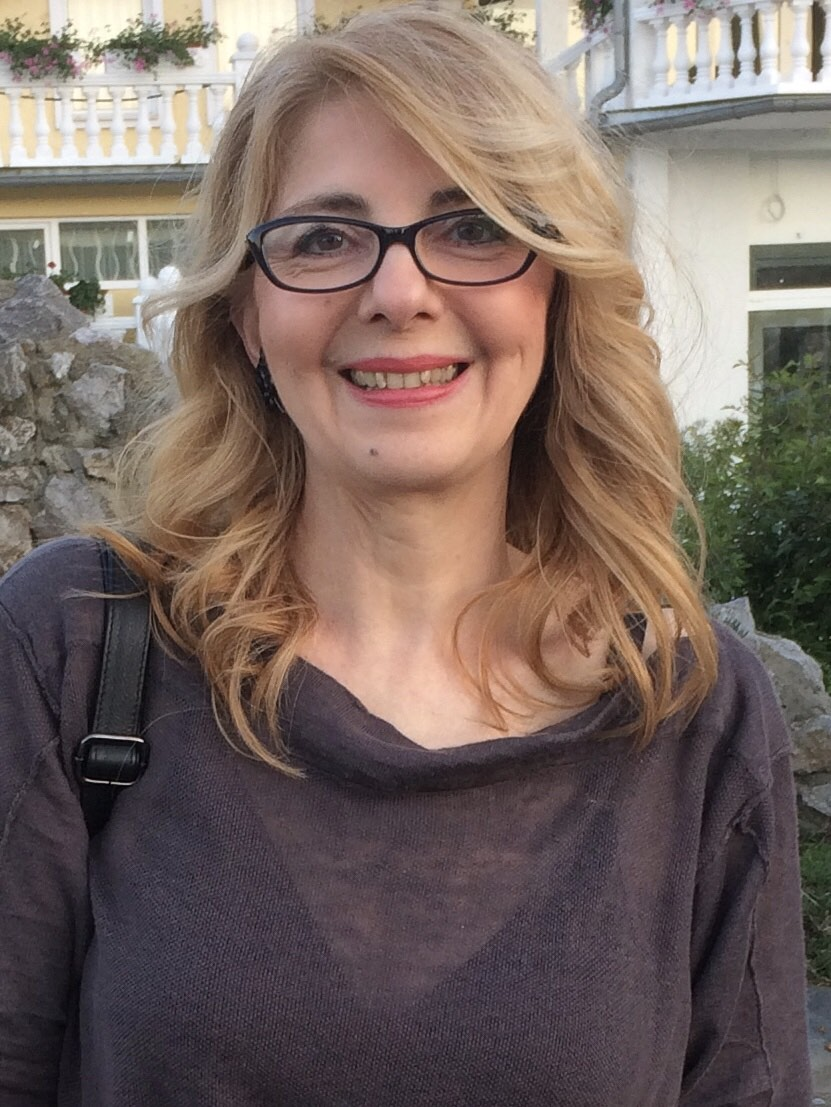

Background information
- Born: Nena Leković; Zaječar, SR Serbia, Yugoslavia
- Genres: Pop; Europop; Synthpop; Pop folk; Children's music; Contemporary folk
- Occupations: Musician; arranger; composer; songwriter
- Instruments: Vocals; piano
- Years active: 1988–present
- Labels: PGP-RTS; City records; Grand Production; Hit Records

Nena Leković is a Serbian songwriter best known for collaborating with several Serbian pop-folk musicians.

== Biography ==
Nena Lekovic was born in Zaječar, Serbia, and studied at Mokranjac Music School. She later finished her studies at the Faculty of Music Arts in Belgrade. Lekovic started her career as a professor at the Josip Slavenski music school.

Lekovic's first success and international recognition as a composer and songwriter came in 1988. She began collaborating with vocal soloists in pop and folk music (including Nataša Bekvalac, Marija Šerifović, Zorica Brunclik, Toše Proeski, Maja Odžaklijevska, Goca Tržan, and Sanja Đorđević, as well as children's choirs and soloists (Kolibri Choir and Carolija).

She received the Award for Mediterranean Sound at the Budva Music Festival 2007 for the song "Ključ od ljubavi". One of her songs, "Otrezni me" was also one of the nominations to represent Serbia and Montenegro at the Eurovision 2006. Lekovic is known for bringing a unique style, working to transform traditional folk music into successful pop compositions. Her successes led to her being selected as a member of the board of Serbian music copyright agency, SOKOJ.

She has done some collaborations with her husband, Zoran Lekovic, a famous Yugoslav pop singer who also is known as a producer, author of lyrics, and actor. She has two children.

== Discography ==
=== Writing and Arrangement (a selection) ===
- 1990 Dušan Kostic – Kad Bi Mi Rekla PGP RTB
- 1992 Extra Nena – Nije Za Tebe Žar PGP RTB
- 1994 Dragica Radosavljevic Cakana, Orkestar Gorana Mitica – Puklo Srce PGP RTS
- 1994 Jasmina Cirovic – Smej Se Nocas PGP RTS
- 1995 Various – Probudi Se Andele PGP RTS
- 1995 Neša Lutovac – Srce Lupa PGP RTS
- 1995 Sanja Ðordevic – Tugo ZaM
- 1996 Dragica Radosavljevic Cakana – Sibirski Vetrovi PGP RTS
- 1998 Dragica Radosavljevic Cakana – Ružo Moja PGP RTS
- 1998 Zorica Brunclik – Zemlja Iz Moga Sna PGP RTS
- 2000 Dragica Radosavljevic Cakana – Hej, I Ja Imam Dušu Grand Production
- 2000 Various – Sve Košava
- 2001 Various – Nece Grom Grand Production
- 2001 Jellena – Ljudi Smo City Records
- 2001 Jellena – Hej Stani Dušo City Records
- 2001 Various – Nisam Ja Bez Prošlosti CentroScena
- 2001 Nataša Bekvalac – Zar S' Njom City Records
- 2002 Koktel Bend – Zlocin City Records
- 2002 Various – Za Dodir Tvojih Usana PGP RTS
- 2003 Jellena – Za Dodir Tvojih Usana City Records
- 2003 Zorana – Bez Brige City Records
- 2003 Various – Kraljica Poroka Music Star Production
- 2004 Various – Tvoje Oci Žive PGP RTS
- 2004 Suzana Mancic – Suze Kamene Grand Production
- 2005 Various – Ne Verujem Ti S Muzika, Radio S
- 2006 Jasna Ðokic – Moje Usne Su Melem Za Telo PGP RTS
- 2006 Various – Otrezni Me PGP RTS
- 2006 Ogi Radivojević – Žig Do Žiga PGP RTS
- 2006 Marija Šerifovic – Na Tvojoj Košulji City Records
- 2007 Toše Proeski – Najlepše Moje City Records
- 2007 Alexandra Perovic* – Opium City Records
- 2008 Goca Tržan – Hotel City Records
- 2008 Zorana – Bez Brige City Records
- 2009 Toše – Najljepše Moje City Records
- 2010 Platinum Collection City Records
- 2010 Dragica Radosavljevic Cakana – Kunem Se Grand Production
- 2014 Miki Peric – Najmanje Si Moja Bila Ti Multimedia Music
- 2025 Jett Vega – Rolerkoster
