= The Hardest Thing =

The Hardest Thing may refer to:

- The Hardest Thing (album), an album by Toše Proeski
  - "The Hardest Thing" (Toše Proeski song)
- "The Hardest Thing" (98 Degrees song), a 1999 single by 98 Degrees
- "The Hardest Thing" (Amphibia), the series finale of Amphibia
- "The Hardest Thing", a 2026 song by Gorillaz from their album The Mountain
