= Bubamara =

Bubamara (ladybug in South Slavic languages) may refer to:

- Dara Bubamara, Serbian singer
- Bubamara Association of Persons with Disabilities
- The nickname of the runaway bride, from the film Black Cat, White Cat
- A soundtrack from the film Black Cat, White Cat
- Zlatna Bubamara na Popularnosta (Golden Ladybug of Popularity), North Macedonia popular culture award
- A song on the soundtrack of the 2009 Ubisoft game Rabbids Go Home
