= Macedonia in the Eurovision Song Contest 2004 =

- Eurovision Song Contest 2004
- Participating broadcaster: Macedonian Radio Television (MRT)
- Country: Macedonia
- Selection process: Artist: Internal selection Song: Skopje Fest 2004
- Selection date: Artist: 7 July 2003; Song: 14 February 2004

Competing entry
- Song: "Life"
- Artist: Toše Proeski
- Songwriters: Jovan Jovanov; Ilija Nikolovski

Placement
- Semi-final result: Qualified (10th, 71 points)
- Final result: 14th, 47 points

Participation chronology

Macedonia (Note: Officially under the provisional appellation "former Yugoslav Republic of Macedonia", abbreviated "FYR Macedonia".) was represented at the Eurovision Song Contest 2004 with the song "Life", composed by Jovan Jovanov, with lyrics by Ilija Nikolovski, and performed by Toše Proeski. The Macedonian participating broadcaster, Macedonian Radio Television (MRT), selected its entry through Skopje Fest 2004, after having previously selected the performer internally. The broadcaster returned to the contest after a one-year absence following their relegation from 2003 as one of the bottom five entrants in 2002. Toše Proeski's appointment was announced on 7 June 2003. Eight songs competed in the competition on 14 February 2004 where "Angel si ti" (Ангел си ти) was selected following the combination of votes from an eleven-member jury panel, Proeski himself and a public televote. The song was later translated from Macedonian to English for Eurovision and was titled "Life".

Macedonia competed in the semi-final of the Eurovision Song Contest which took place on 12 May 2004. Performing during the show in position 15, "Life" was announced among the top 10 entries of the semi-final and therefore qualified to compete in the final on 15 May. It was later revealed that Macedonia placed tenth out of the 22 participating countries in the semi-final with 71 points. In the final, Macedonia performed in position 15 and placed 14th out of the 24 participating countries, scoring 47 points.

== Background ==
Prior to the 2004 contest, Macedonian Radio Television (MRT) had participated in the Eurovision Song Contest representing Macedonia three times since its first entry in 1998. Its best result in the contest to this point was fifteenth, achieved in 2000 with the song "100% te ljubam" performed by XXL.

As part of its duties as participating broadcaster, MRT organises the selection of its entry in the Eurovision Song Contest and broadcasts the event in the country. The broadcaster had previously selected all of its entries for the contest by using the national final Skopje Fest. MRT confirmed its intentions to participate at the 2004 contest on 7 July 2003. For 2004, the broadcaster opted to internally select its artist, with the song selected through Skopje Fest 2004.

== Before Eurovision ==
=== Artist selection ===
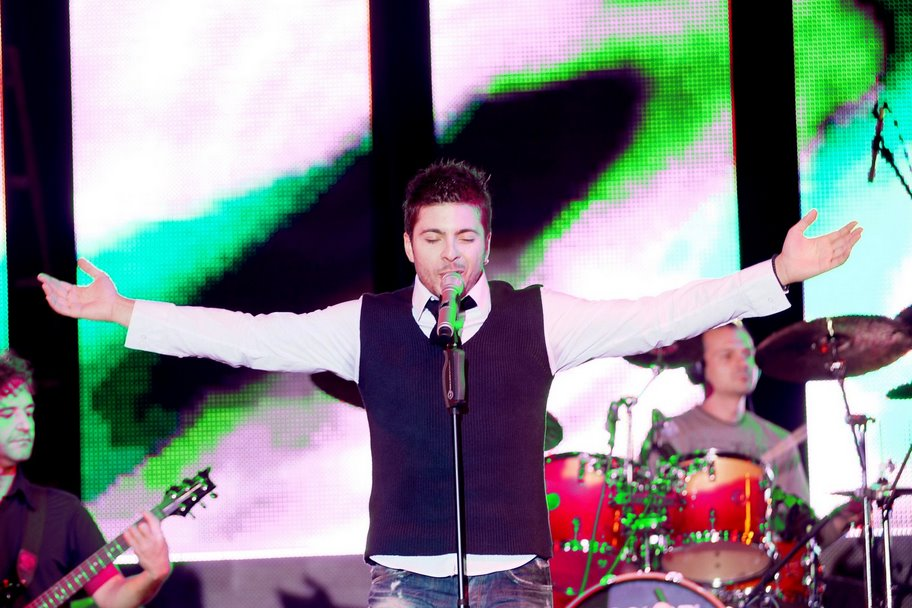
Toše Proeski was internally selected to represent Macedonia in the Eurovision Song Contest 2004

On 7 July 2003, MRT announced during a press conference at the Holiday Inn Hotel in Skopje that it had internally selected Toše Proeski to represent Macedonia in Istanbul. Proeski previously attempted to represent Macedonia at the Eurovision Song Contest by competing in the country's national final selections on several occasions: in 1998 with the song "Ostani do kraj" which he performed with the group Megatim Plus and placed eighth, and in 2000 with the song "Solzi pravat zlaten prsten" which placed third. MRT also announced that it would organise the Skopje Fest 2004 song contest to select the song Toše Proeski would perform.

=== Skopje Fest 2004 ===
A submission period was opened for interested composers to submit their songs until 15 October 2003. MRT received 60 submissions at the closing of the deadline and eight songs were selected by a twelve-member committee consisting of Mihail Rendžov (poet), Jana Andreevska (composer), Radica Mitić (MR 2), Svetlana Marković (sound designer), Ivan Mirčevski (MTV), Arben Shaqiri (singer), Danail Darkovski (composer and instrumentalist), John Ilija Apelgren (singer), Ariton Krliu (MR 2), Ilija Pejovski (composer and conductor), Liliana Petrović (manager of Toše Proeski) and Proeski himself. The eight competing songs, all in Macedonian, were announced on 9 January 2004 and later appeared on Proeski's forthcoming album Den za nas. English versions of the eight songs were also recorded along with six of the songs in Serbian which appeared on the Serbian version of the album Dan za nas.

| Song | | Songwriter(s) |
| Macedonian title | English title | Songwriter(s) |
|---|---|---|
| "Angel si ti" (Ангел си ти) | "Life Is..." | Jovan Jovanov |
| "Daleku od mene" (Далеку од мене) | "I Love You and I Hate You" | Zorica Katrandžiska, Vesna Malinova |
| "Egzotičen son" (Егзотичен сон) | "Exotic Dream" | Aleksandar Čekredži, Maja Pavlovska |
| "Go lažam sekoj nov refren" (Го лажам секој нов рефрен) | "Each New Refrain I Prevaricate" | Ljupčo Mirkovski, Ognen Nedelkovski |
| "Hej sinooka, hej bosonoga" (Хеј синоока, хеј босонога) | "Blue-eyed, Barefooted" | Mirjana Danilovska, Kire Kostov |
| "Ljubena" (Љубена) | "Cherished" | Simon Trpčeski, Jovan Trpčevski |
| "Parče od Evropa" (Парче од Европа) | "Shred of Europe" | Goran Alački, Maja Pavlovska |
| "Zošto otide" (Зошто отиде) | "Why Did You Leave" | Blažo Temelkov |

==== Final ====
Skopje Fest 2004 took place on 14 January 2004 at the Universal Hall in Skopje, hosted by Karolina Petkovska and Aneta Andonova and was broadcast on MTV 1 and MTV Sat. Macedonian versions of the eight competing songs were performed by Toše Proeski during the competition and "Angel si ti" was selected as the winning song by a combination of public televoting (1/3), votes from Proeski himself (1/3) and an eleven-member jury panel (1/3). The jury panel consisted of Srgjan Kerim (Media Print Makedonija), Esma Redžepova (singer-songwriter), Aleksandar Džambazov (composer), Bubo Karov (K-15), Ariton Krliu (MR 2), Dario (singer), Iskra Trpeva (singer), Aleksandar Masevski (composer and producer), Oliver Belopeta (artistic director), Sašo Čolakovski (journalist) and Ivan Mirčevski (MTV). The English versions of the eight songs were also presented to the public through 40-second samples after each song was performed. In addition to the performances of the competing songs, the competition featured a guest performance by Synthesis.

Final – 14 February 2004
| R/O | Song | Jury | Toše Proeski | Televote | | Total | Place |
| R/O | Song | Jury | Toše Proeski | Votes | Points | Total | Place |
|---|---|---|---|---|---|---|---|
| 1 | "Daleku od mene" | 51 | 66 | 6,234 | 66 | 182 | 2 |
| 2 | "Egzotičen son" | 16 | 0 | 704 | 0 | 16 | 8 |
| 3 | "Ljubena" | 16 | 22 | 796 | 0 | 38 | 7 |
| 4 | "Zošto otide" | 17 | 0 | 1,453 | 22 | 39 | 6 |
| 5 | "Angel si ti" | 80 | 88 | 8,487 | 88 | 256 | 1 |
| 6 | "Hej sinooka, hej bosonoga" | 20 | 44 | 948 | 11 | 75 | 4 |
| 7 | "Parče od Evropa" | 15 | 11 | 1,640 | 33 | 59 | 5 |
| 8 | "Go lažam sekoj nov refren" | 49 | 33 | 2,862 | 44 | 126 | 3 |

Detailed Jury Votes
| R/O | Song | Srgjan Kerim | Esma Redžepova | Aleksandar Džambazov | Bubo Karov | Ariton Krliu | Dario | Iskra Trpeva | Aleksandar Masevski | Oliver Belopeta | Sašo Čolakovski | Ivan Mirčevski | Total |
|---|---|---|---|---|---|---|---|---|---|---|---|---|---|
| 1 | "Daleku od mene" | 4 | 1 | 1 | 8 | 6 | 8 | 6 | 6 | 1 | 4 | 6 | 51 |
| 2 | "Egzotičen son" | | | | | 1 | 6 | 2 | 2 | 3 | 2 | | 16 |
| 3 | "Ljubena" | 1 | 2 | 4 | 3 | | 1 | 1 | | | 1 | 3 | 16 |
| 4 | "Zošto otide" | | | | 1 | 2 | 2 | 3 | 3 | 4 | | 2 | 17 |
| 5 | "Angel si ti" | 8 | 8 | 8 | 4 | 8 | 4 | 8 | 8 | 8 | 8 | 8 | 80 |
| 6 | "Hej sinooka, hej bosonoka" | 2 | 4 | 2 | 2 | 3 | | | 1 | 2 | 3 | 1 | 20 |
| 7 | "Parče od Evropa" | 3 | 6 | 6 | | | | | | | | | 15 |
| 8 | "Go lažam sekoj nov refren" | 6 | 3 | 3 | 6 | 4 | 3 | 4 | 4 | 6 | 6 | 4 | 49 |

== At Eurovision ==
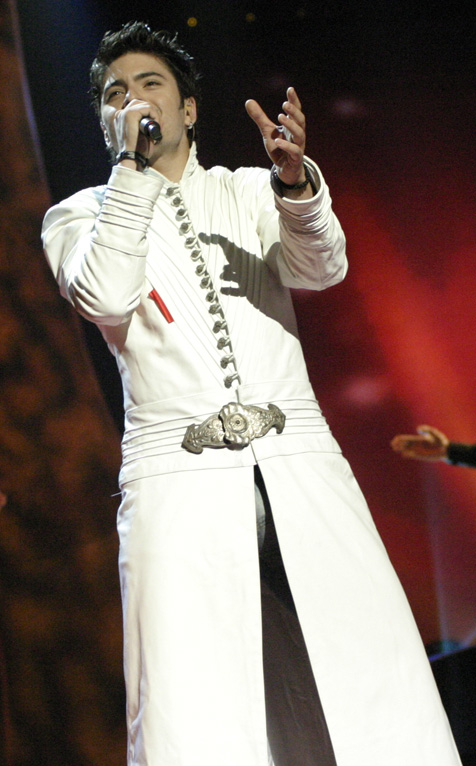
Toše Proeski during a rehearsal before the semi-final

It was announced that the competition's format would be expanded to include a semi-final in 2004. According to the rules, all nations with the exceptions of the host country, the "Big Four" (France, Germany, Spain and the United Kingdom), and the ten highest placed finishers in the 2003 contest are required to qualify from the semi-final on 12 May 2004 in order to compete for the final on 15 May 2004; the top ten countries from the semi-final progress to the final. On 23 March 2004, a special allocation draw was held which determined the running order for the semi-final and Macedonia was set to perform in position 15, following the entry from Cyprus and before the entry from Slovenia. Toše Proeski performed the English version of "Angel si ti" at the contest, titled "Life" (formerly "Life Is..."). Among the backing performers that joined Proeski on stage for the Macedonian performance was Tamara Todevska who would go on to represent Macedonia in 2008 and in 2019.

At the end of the semi-final, Macedonia was announced as having finished in the top 10 and consequently qualifying for the grand final. It was later revealed that Macedonia placed tenth in the semi-final, receiving a total of 71 points. The draw for the running order for the final was done by the presenters during the announcement of the ten qualifying countries during the semi-final and Macedonia was drawn to perform in position 15, following the entry from Russia and before the entry from Greece. Macedonia placed fourteenth in the final, scoring 47 points.

The semi-final and final were broadcast in Macedonia on MTV 1 and MTV Sat with commentary by Milanka Rašić. MRT appointed Karolina Petkovska as its spokesperson to announce the results of the Macedonian televote during the final. Following the release of the televoting figures by the EBU after the conclusion of the competition, it was revealed that a total of 63,507 televotes were cast in Macedonia during the two shows: 15,908 votes during the semi-final and 47,599 votes during the final.

=== Voting ===
Below is a breakdown of points awarded to Macedonia and awarded by Macedonia in the semi-final and grand final of the contest. The nation awarded its 12 points to Albania in the semi-final and the final of the contest.

==== Points awarded to Macedonia ====
Points awarded to Macedonia (Semi-final)
| Score | Country |
|---|---|
| 12 points | Serbia and Montenegro |
| 10 points | |
| 8 points | Albania; Bosnia and Herzegovina |
| 7 points | |
| 6 points | Slovenia; Ukraine |
| 5 points | Croatia; Switzerland |
| 4 points | Greece; Romania |
| 3 points | Germany; Turkey |
| 2 points | Austria; Sweden |
| 1 point | Denmark; Malta; Netherlands |

Points awarded to Macedonia (Final)
| Score | Country |
|---|---|
| 12 points | Serbia and Montenegro |
| 10 points | |
| 8 points | Bosnia and Herzegovina |
| 7 points | Slovenia |
| 6 points | Albania |
| 5 points | Croatia |
| 4 points | Turkey |
| 3 points | Ukraine |
| 2 points | |
| 1 point | Malta; Switzerland |

==== Points awarded by Macedonia ====
Points awarded by Macedonia (Semi-final)
| Score | Country |
|---|---|
| 12 points | Albania |
| 10 points | Serbia and Montenegro |
| 8 points | Ukraine |
| 7 points | Greece |
| 6 points | Croatia |
| 5 points | Bosnia and Herzegovina |
| 4 points | Malta |
| 3 points | Netherlands |
| 2 points | Finland |
| 1 point | Slovenia |

Points awarded by Macedonia (Final)
| Score | Country |
|---|---|
| 12 points | Albania |
| 10 points | Serbia and Montenegro |
| 8 points | Ukraine |
| 7 points | Greece |
| 6 points | Turkey |
| 5 points | Croatia |
| 4 points | Bosnia and Herzegovina |
| 3 points | Malta |
| 2 points | Sweden |
| 1 point | Spain |
