= Nekade vo noḱta =

Studio album by Toše Proeski
- Released: 1999
- Recorded: 1999
- Genre: Pop
- Label: Avalon Production

Toše Proeski chronology
Nekade vo noḱta (1999)	Sinot Božji (2000)

Singles from Nekade vo noḱta
- 1. "Pusti me" Released: 1996; 2. "Tvoite baknezhi na moite beli koshuli" Released: 1999; 3. "Sonce vo tvoite rusi kosi" Released: 1999; 4. "Usni na usni" Released: 1999; 5. "Morska DZvezdo" Released: 2000

Nekade vo noḱta (Macedonian: Некаде во ноќта) is the debut studio album by the Macedonian singer Toše Proeski, released in 1999 by Avalon Production.

== Release ==
Proeski's debut album, Nekade vo noḱta (Somewhere in the night), was released by Avalon Production in 1999.

== Track listing ==
1. "Tvoite bakneži na moite beli košuli" - Твоите бакнежи на моите бели кошули
2. "Eh da sum zlato" - Ех да сум злато
3. "Go molam neboto da mi te vrati" - Го молам небото да ми те врати
4. "Skrši me" - Скрши ме
5. "Posle doždot doaǵa sonce" - После дождот доаѓа сонце
6. "Ruski Rulet" - Руски рулет
7. "Pusti me" - Пушти ме
8. "Ostani do kraj" - Остани до крај
9. "Pobegni" - Побегни
10. "Sonce vo tvoite rusi kosi" - Сонце во твоите руси коси
11. "Usni na usni" - Усни на усни

== Chart positions ==
Year	Song	Chart positions
Year	Song	Macedonia
1999	"Tvoite Baknezhi na moite beli koshuli"	1
1999	"Sonce vo tvoite rusi kosi"	1
1999–2000	"Usni na usni"	1

== Awards ==
Golden Ladybug of Popularity

- Best Male Vocalist of the Year
- Album of the Year
