= Toše Proeski =

Macedonian singer (1981–2007)

Toše Proeski Тоше Проески
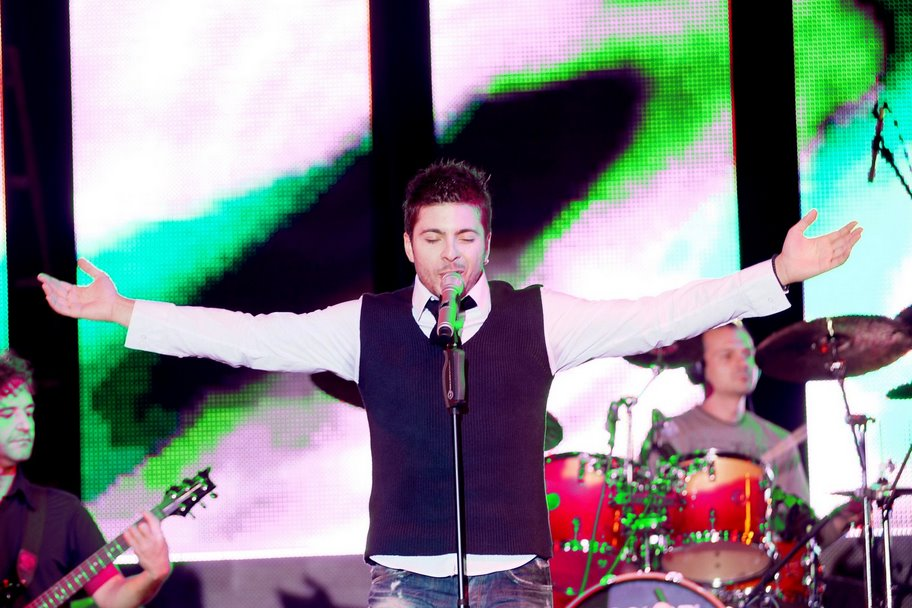
- Proeski performing at his last concert in 2007

Background information
- Born: Todor Proeski; 25 January 1981; Prilep, SR Macedonia, SFR Yugoslavia
- Died: 16 October 2007 (aged 26) Nova Gradiška, Croatia
- Genres: Macedonian folk; pop; pop-rock; rock; electronic
- Occupations: Singer; songwriter
- Instrument: Vocals
- Years active: 1996–2007
- Labels: Avalon; City; BK Music
- Partner(s): Andrijana Budimir (2001–2004; 2007)

Todor "Toše" Proeski (Macedonian: Тодор „Тоше“ Проески, pronounced [ˈtɔʃɛ ˈprɔɛski]; 25 January 1981 – 16 October 2007) was a Macedonian singer and songwriter. Considered a top act of the local Macedonian and Balkan music scene, Proeski's music was popular across multiple countries in Southeast Europe. Proeski has been dubbed as the "Balkan Elvis". He was also acclaimed for his commitment to humanitarian causes, including serving as UNICEF ambassador and holding charity concerts. He died in a highway car crash in Croatia in 2007 at the age of 26, and received substantial posthumous recognition.

== Biography ==
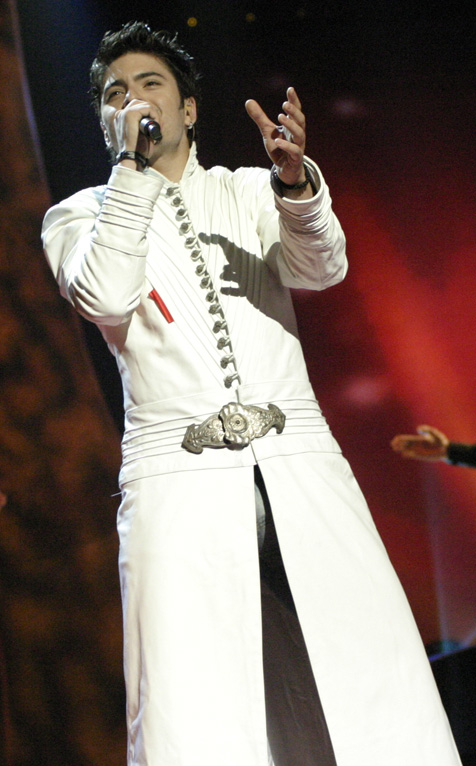
Proeski at the rehearsal of the Eurovision Song Contest 2004.

Proeski was born in Prilep on 25 January 1981 into an Aromanian family and grew up in Kruševo. His grandfather was an actor in the Kruševo theater. He studied in primary school in Kruševo, and secondary music school in Bitola. Professors of the latter school had Proeski moved from the department of clarinet to singing as he did not have a clarinet because his parents could not afford it. He studied at the Faculty of Musical Arts in Skopje. Proeski was a devout Orthodox Christian and member of the Macedonian Orthodox Church. Per music scholar Dave Wilson:

Because of his typical shared cultural practices (including his status as a baptised and devout member of the Macedonian Orthodox Church) and high level of assimilation with ethnic Macedonians, he is not precluded from participating in the Macedonian ethnicity. He never hid his Vlah ethnicity, although he did not emphasise it, rather positioning himself as Macedonian in a manner consistent with other Vlahs.

Musician Hristo Hristovski - Mularot made the suggestion to Proeski's parents that he should perform at the popular children's song festival Zlatno Slavejče (English: Golden Nightingale) in Skopje with a song of his. Thus at the age of 12, he performed with the song "Јаs i mојоt dеdо" (Me and my grandfather) in the Aromanian language. He won the 1996 Melfest festival in Prilep at the age of 15, with the performance of the song "Yesterday" by The Beatles.

In 1997, he performed the song "Pušti me" (Let me go) at MakFest. In the same year, he was an extra in the film The Peacemaker. In 1998, he performed at the Skopje Festival with Kristijan Gabroski's song "Stay to the End", while also performing the song "Usni na usni" (Lips on lips) by Grigor Koprov and Ognen Nedelkovski, at the festival "Ohrid Troubadours". For the latter song, Proeski received the second prize from the jury. In November of the same year, Proeski received the "Grand Prix" award at the Eurofest festival in Skopje for the song "Sun in Your Blonde Hair" by Grigor Koprov, Ognen Nedelkovski and Konstantin Ikonomov. In 1999, at the Skopje Festival, Proeski sang his third big hit "Your Kisses on My White Shirts" by the same Koprov-Nedelkovski duo. He signed a contract with Avalon Production, after which his debut album "Somewhere in the Night" was released in 1999. In the summer of the same year, Proeski held his first concert at the Skating Rink in Skopje. In 2000, Proeski participated in the Skopje Fest (where the Macedonian representative for Eurovision was selected) with the song "Tears Make a Golden Ring" by Grigor Koprov and Ognen Nedelkovski. The song, despite winning the television vote, won third place, behind Karolina Gočeva and the winners XXL. After this, he released his second album "Sinot Božji" (The Son of God), which reached the top of the Macedonian charts. His second album was promoted in June 2000. In addition to Koprov and Nedelkovski, Proeski also collaborated with Kire Kostov, Miodrag Vrčakovski, Mirjana Danailoska, etc, for the album. After his performance at the Slavic Bazaar at Belarus with the song "Tajno moja" (My Secret), Proeski became known to the international public. His first two albums each had number one hits in Macedonia, and for both, he received Album of the Year and Best Male Vocalist at the Macedonian show Golden Ladybug of Popularity. After Serbian production house BK Sound purchased the rights to promote "Sinot Božji" around the former Yugoslavia, he received an Oscar of popularity in Belgrade by public vote.

In 2001, Proeski toured Australia, where he was welcomed by the Macedonian community. In the same year, Proeski placed second at the Sunčane Skale festival held on 12, 13 and 14 July in Herceg Novi with the song "Sun in Your Blond Hair". The readers of the newspaper Večer declared him as the television personality of 2001 by vote. Proeski began to gain fame across former Yugoslavia when he began to release songs in Serbian and have promotional tours around the Balkans in 2002. In the summer of 2002, after the expiration of his contract with Avalon, Proeski signed a contract with Final Cut Productions and Ljiljana Petrović became his manager. Apart from the former Yugoslavia, Proeski also toured and performed in Greece and Bulgaria. He recorded his third album "If You Look Me in the Eyes" (released in 2002) in Macedonian and Serbian. This album was made in Athens and was promoted in Serbia, Macedonia, Bosnia and Herzegovina and Bulgaria. Most songs were written and produced by Greek songwriter Phoebus and producer and arranger Manolis Vlachos, with lyrics by Serbian lyricist Marina Tucaković. The songs had been previously composed by Phoebus and Vlachos, previously released by Greek pop singers with Greek lyrics and musical arrangements almost identical to those used by Proeski. For the album, Proeski was awarded with Album of the Year, Best Male Vocalist and Song of the Year at Golden Ladybug of Popularity, and all 5 songs were number one on the Macedonian charts. Macedonian Romani singer Esma Redžepova appeared in the song "Magija" (Magic) and its music video from this album. The album also became the most pirated, which earned him the nickname "King of the Pirates".

In January 2003, he was accompanied on stage by Redžepova for his United Kingdom debut at the Equinox club in London's Leicester Square. In April 2003, Proeski won in the Belgrade music festival Beovizija with the song "Čija si" (Whose Are You), made by Leontina Vukomanović and Željko Joksimović. Proeski was supposed to represent Serbia and Montenegro at the Eurovision Song Contest 2003 with the song. However, Serbia and Montenegro did not participate that year. The song became a hit in the former Yugoslav countries. In 2003, he received training in New York from the vocal coach of Luciano Pavarotti, William Riley, to improve his singing. After his return to Macedonia, Proeski held charity concerts in cities across Macedonia. In the same year, he became UNICEF's regional goodwill ambassador. Proeski helped equip the hematology department of the Children's Hospital in Skopje. In 2004, Proeski was chosen by broadcaster Macedonian Radio Television to represent Macedonia at the Eurovision Song Contest in Istanbul, Turkey. The song "Angel si ti" (You are an angel) was chosen as Proeski's entry for Eurovision. Proeski received the blessing of the archbishop of the Macedonian Orthodox Church, Stephen of Ohrid, on his departure for the contest. At the Eurovision, Proeski performed the English version of the song, where he placed 14th out of 24 contestants, gaining 47 points. In 2004, Proeski released the album "A Day for Us". In September 2004, he became a national goodwill ambassador for UNICEF and received the Mother Theresa Humanitarian Award. On that occasion, he recorded the song "Za ovoj svet" (For This World) by Mladen Marković and Vesna Malinova. It became the anthem of UNICEF.

At the end of 2004, Proeski signed a contract with Dallas Records to release his next album in Croatia and Slovenia. Proeski recorded the song "Krajnje vreme" together with the Slovene singer Anja Rupel. In 2005, Proeski's fifth album "Po tebe" (After You) was a hit in the Balkans, rising to the top charts in Macedonia, Bosnia and Herzegovina, Croatia, Serbia and Slovenia. Most of its songs were authored by Miro Buljan and Antonija Šola, and the Macedonian translations were made by Vlado Janevski. A fictionalized version of him as a superhero appeared in the Macedonian comic "Super Toše" in 2005. In an interview for Serbian newspaper Blic in 2005, he stated:

My name is Todor Proeski. It is true that my grandfather's last name was Proia, but under the influence of the environment they changed the last name to be in the spirit of the Macedonian language. But, let me tell you, I plan to return my old last name if I decide to make a global career. I think that foreigners find Proia much easier to pronounce and remember than Proeski.

Proeski sang songs in Macedonian, Serbian, Croatian, Bosnian, Slovenian and Aromanian. His album "Božilak" (Rainbow), released in 2006, consists of 14 Macedonian traditional songs sung in arrangements with a symphonic orchestra. Such songs include Zajdi, zajdi, jasno sonce, More sokol pie and Jovano, Jovanke. The arrangers of the songs have been Ilija Pejovski, Saša Nikolovski and Soni Petrovski. The album was released in Macedonia, Bosnia and Herzegovina, Serbia, Montenegro, and Croatia. In the same year, he recorded "Srce nije kamen" (The heart is not a rock) in Croatian as the opening theme for the Croatian soap opera Zabranjena ljubav (Forbidden Love), whose lyrics were written by Antonija Šola. Proeski also had a role in one episode of the show.

In August 2007, Proeski released his final album "Games Without Borders" (Igri bez granici/Igra bez granica) in Macedonia, Serbia, Croatia, Bosnia and Herzegovina, Montenegro and Slovenia. The authors of the songs include Nikša Bratoš, Miro Buljan, Miroslav Rus, Antonija Šola, Vesna Malinova and Zoran Leković. Many of the songs were initially made in Serbo-Croatian, and then translated into Macedonian for the Macedonian-language release. The songs "Cherish", "Games Without Borders", and "Are You Happy" became hits in all Balkan countries. In the same year, Proeski also recorded the fan anthem "Macedonia Cheers for You", by Aleksandar Mitevski, a song that has been performed before Macedonian sport matches. His final concert in the City Stadium in Skopje was held on 5 October, a charity co-organized by USAID and the Ministry of Education, for the reconstruction of schools, and was attended by over 25,000 people. During his life, he was referred to as the "Balkan Elvis" and was admired for his charisma and vocal abilities across multiple genres such as pop music and traditional music. When he was not performing, Proeski continued to study classical music in Skopje.

== Death ==
During the early morning of 16 October 2007, at approximately 6:30 am, Proeski died in a car accident on the Zagreb–Lipovac highway near Nova Gradiška, Croatia. He was a passenger along with his manager Ljiljana Petrović in a Volkswagen Touareg. The Touareg crashed into the back of a truck trailer, killing Proeski instantly. The Touareg then crashed into the median barrier, after the trailer threw the car aside. None of the airbags were activated. The truck sustained no damage. The car was driven by his driver and friend Gjorgji Gjorgievski. Proeski was asleep in the front passenger seat at the time of the crash. He was 26 years old. Of the other two passengers, only the driver suffered serious injuries (head trauma). According to Croatian authorities and experts, the Touareg crashed at 171 km/h (106 mph), while the speed limit on that road was 130 km/h (81 mph). Per Macedonian experts, the speed was slightly lower, between 140–158 km/h (87–98 mph). According to them, none of the functions on the vehicle failed, and that the airbags did not open because the vehicle's deceleration was in a level where they could not be activated.

Immediately after Proeski's death was announced, the citizens of Macedonia, gathered in major squares across the country, bringing candles, flowers and messages of condolence in his memory. Similar gatherings took place around the Balkans, especially in the former Yugoslav countries and the diaspora. People visited the Macedonian embassies and signed the commemorative books, lit candles at squares, TVs played his music and discussed his life. Members of Macedonia’s parliament observed a minute of silence. Television and radio stations across Macedonia were showing his concerts, music videos, tributes, and songs.

Proeski's body was transported to Macedonia by a helicopter of the Macedonian Army, arriving at night in Skopje. The country's leadership received his body, before they continued to transport it to Kruševo. The Embassy of the United States of America, UNICEF, the USAID and the Diplomatic mission of the European Union published official statements on Proeski's death. 17 October was declared as a national day of mourning in Macedonia. The three days following his death were pronounced days of mourning in Kruševo. After his death, the government of the Republic of Macedonia gave him the title "Honorable citizen of Macedonia".

=== State funeral and aftermath ===
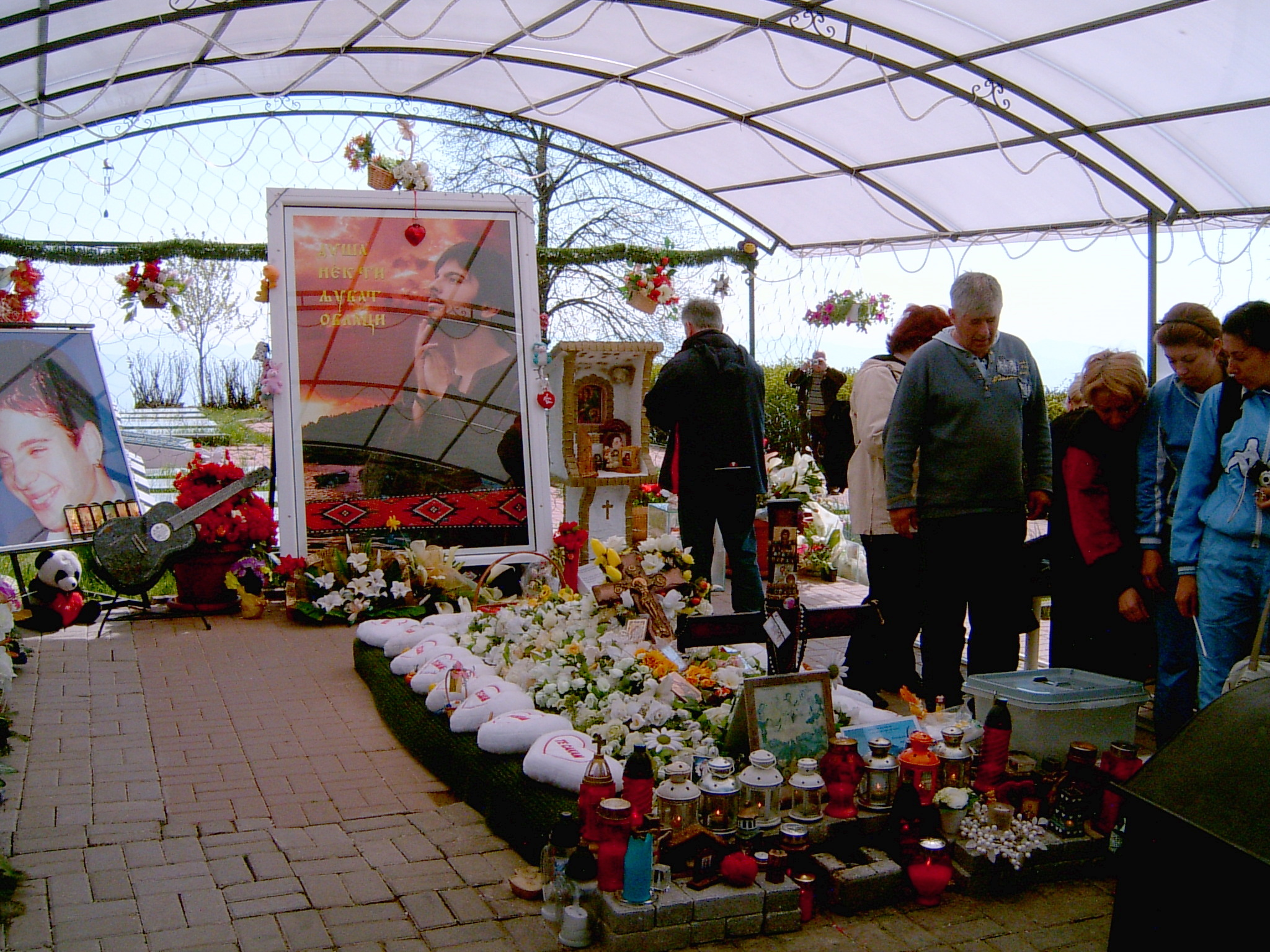
Proeski's grave in Kruševo has become a pilgrimage point

The government organized an official state funeral for Proeski, which was held on 17 October 2007 in his home town of Kruševo, including military honor ceremonies by the Ceremonial Guard Battalion of the Macedonian Army (personnel of which conducted an honorary rifle salute) and a military band. His coffin was covered with the flag of Macedonia. The funeral, which was broadcast by the national Macedonian TV, was attended by many domestic and foreign delegations, including the president Branko Crvenkovski, the prime minister Nikola Gruevski, members of the government, the Macedonian parliament's president Ljubiša Georgievski and other high-ranking officials, the US and the EU Ambassadors Gillian Milovanovic and Erwan Fouéré and other diplomats, representatives from human rights organizations, sports clubs, etc. Also, the funeral was attended by people from Macedonia and neighboring countries. The religious service was held by the Macedonian Orthodox Church led by the Archbishop Stephen of Ohrid. His grave has become a pilgrimage site.

Numerous websites, blogs, and internet forums have been filled with the last messages from his fans and friends. In 2009, Proeski's driver was sentenced to two years in prison for the car accident which resulted in his death.

== Honors ==
On 5 October 2008, the anniversary of Proeski's last concert before his death, a tribute concert was held in Skopje. Over 20 singers from Balkan countries performed. In 2009, his posthumous album, "The Hardest Thing", and a documentary about the end of his life, Toše Proeski: The Hardest Thing, were released. On 25 January 2011, Macedonian president Gjorge Ivanov awarded a posthumous Order of Merits to Proeski because of "his sincere and deep humanism, artistic achievements and uniting energy", which was received by Proeski's nephew.

The "Toše Proeski Memorial House" in Gumenje in Kruševo was opened on 25 April 2011. The museum has all of his awards, many of his belongings from his childhood, recreations of his living room and his home recording studio, including a wax model of Proeski. The museum has the shape of a cross as a reference to his devout Orthodox faith. Its interior walls are covered with song lyrics, including his signature phrase from his performances, "Ve sakam site" (I love you all), translated into over 100 languages. At the World Architecture Festival (WAF) in Barcelona, the building won the award "People's Choice Award". A year after the opening of the museum, a monograph about it was published, promoted by the minister of culture Elizabeta Kančeska-Milevska. Per its director in 2018, it was visited by more than 600,000 people. According to acting director of the museum in 2021, over 700,000 guests have visited it in ten years.

Since his death, each year on 25 January, Mile Stojkoski has run a marathon in his wheelchair from Prilep to Proeski's grave in Kruševo. In August 2012, a bronze statue of him was placed at the Art Bridge in Skopje as part of "Skopje 2014". A mosaic with his image was revealed in Prilep in October 2012. A biographical book about Proeski by journalist Sonja Aleksoska Nedelkovska, titled Ova ne e kraj (This is not the end), was published in 2014. In 2015, his song "If you wanna leave me" was published by the Croatian newspaper Jutarnji list.

On 9 April 2019, North Macedonia's government made a decision to rename the sports stadium "Philip II" in the capital city of Skopje in honor of Proeski. The stadium's name is "Toše Proeski National Arena". A statue in honor of Proeski was placed in Nova Gradiška in 2021. However, the statue was subject to criticism by locals on social media, with many saying that it does not look like Proeski and that "even the Macedonians wouldn't recognize it".

The Ministry of Culture and Tourism of North Macedonia has announced a feature film, a documentary and a television series in honor of the life of Proeski. The Macedonian Radio Television had a competition in 2025 for filmmakers interested in working on the announced project. On 26 May 2025, Aromanian artist Zoran Cardula celebrated Aromanian National Day with a publication of a portrait of him and other Aromanians.

== Gallery ==
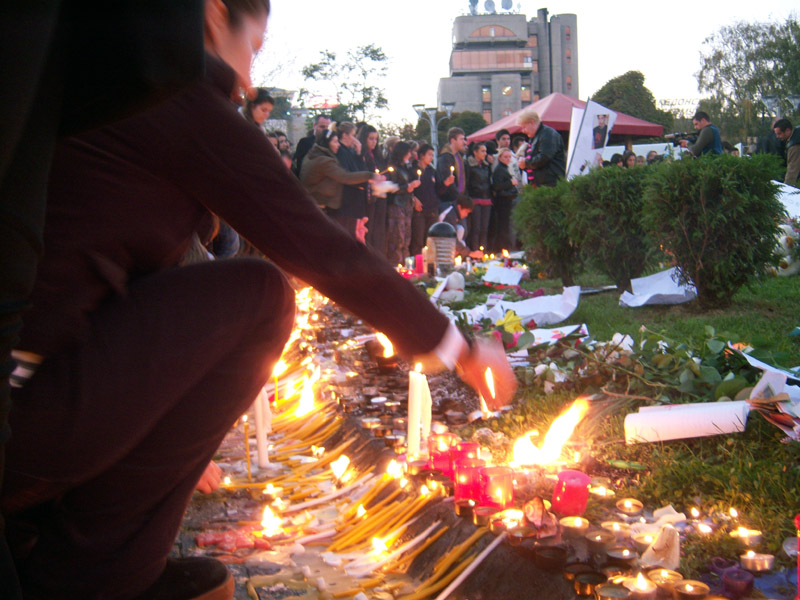

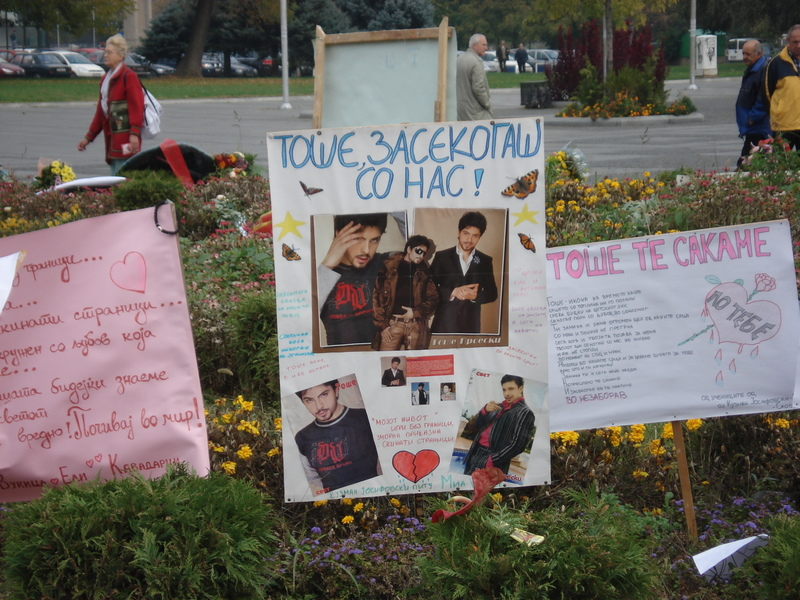

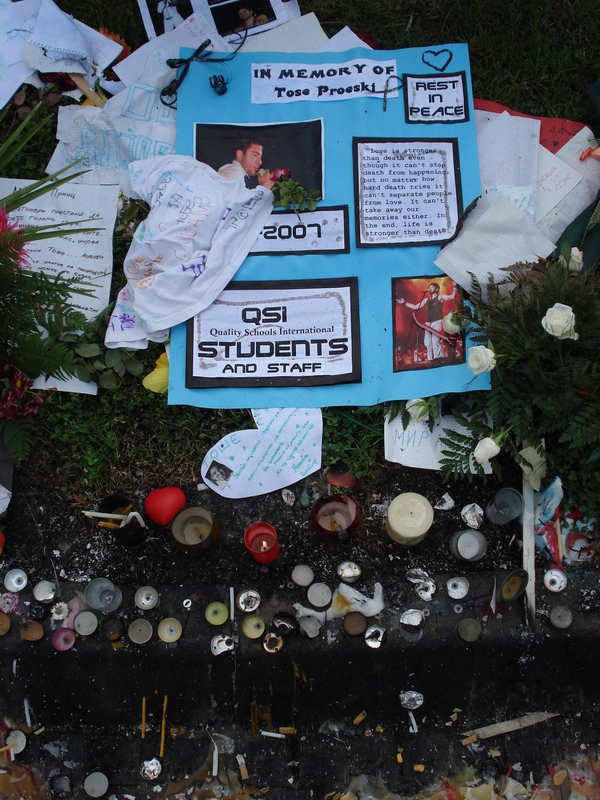

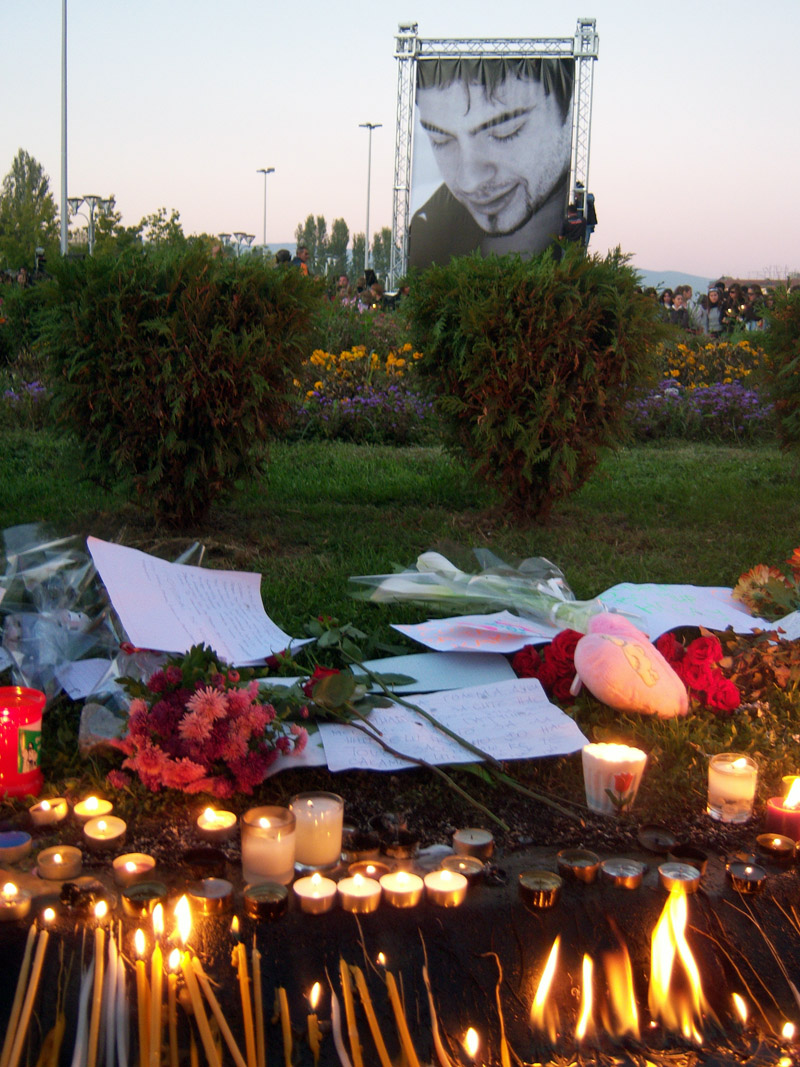

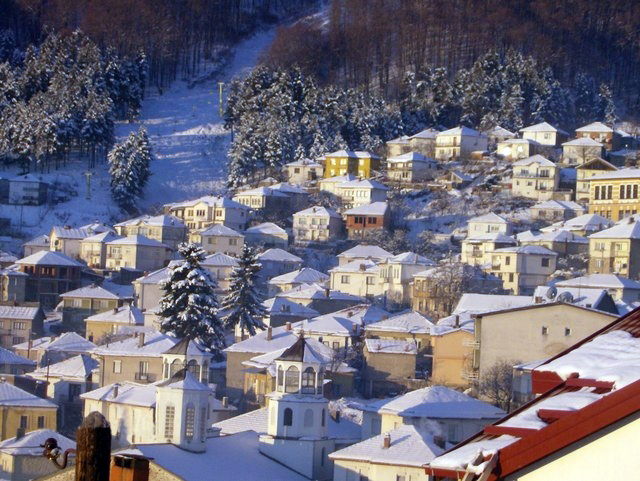

== Discography ==
=== Studio albums ===
- Nekade vo nokjta (Somewhere in the Night; 1999)
- Sinot Božji (The Son of God; 2000)
- Ako me pogledneš vo oči / Ako me pogledaš u oči (If You Look Me in the Eyes; 2002)
- Den za nas / Dan za nas (A Day for Us; 2004)
- Po tebe / Pratim te (After You; 2005)
- Božilak (Rainbow; 2006)
- Igri bez granici / Igra bez granica (Games Without Borders; 2007)
- The Hardest Thing (2009, posthumous)

== Filmography ==
- The Peacemaker as Choir singer (uncredited) (1997)
- Zabranjena ljubav (Forbidden Love) as Boško Cutić (2006)

== Singles chart positions ==
His chart toppers include:

Year	Single	Translation	Chart positions							Album
Year	Single	Translation	MKD	SCG	CRO	BIH	TUR	ZAF	MTV Adria	Album
1999	"Tajno moja"	"My Secret"	1	—	—	—	—	—	—	Sinot Božji
2003	"Ako me pogledneš vo oči/Ako me pogledaš u oči"	"If You Look into My Eyes"	1	1	—	1	—	—	—	Ako me pogledneš vo oči/Ako me pogledaš u oči
2003	"Soba za taga/Soba za tugu"	"Room of Sorrow"	1	1	—	1	—	—	—	Ako me pogledneš vo oči/Ako me pogledaš u oči
2003	"Magija/Čini" (feat. Esma Redžepova)	"Spells"	1	1	—	1	—	—	—	Ako me pogledneš vo oči/Ako me pogledaš u oči
2004	"Life"	—	1	2	—	—	25	49	—	Den za nas/Dan za nas
2004	"Čija si"	"To Whom Do You Belong"	1	1	—	1	10	—	—	Den za nas/Dan za nas
2005	"Žao mi je"	"I Am Sorry"	—	—	—	—	—	—	—	Po tebe/Pratim te
2005	"Po tebe/Pratim te"	"After You/I'm Following You"	1	1	—	1	1	—	—	Po tebe/Pratim te
2005	"Koj li ti grize obrazi/Ko ti to grize obraze"	"Who's Biting Your Cheeks"	1	1	1	—	1	—	—	Po tebe/Pratim te
2007	"Srce nije kamen"	"The Heart Isn't Made of Stone"	—	—	1	—	3	—	—	Igri bez granici/Igra bez granica
2007	"Volim osmijeh tvoj" (feat. Antonija Šola)	"I Love Your Smile"	1	1	1	1	1	—	—	Igri bez granici/Igra bez granica
2007	"Nikoj kako tebe ne baknuva/Ubijaš me usnama"	"No One Kisses Like You/You Are Killing Me with Your Lips"	1	—	1	—	3	—	—	Igri bez granici/Igra bez granica
2007	"Veži me za sebe"	"Bind Me to Yourself"	—	—	1	—	4	—	—	Igri bez granici/Igra bez granica
2007	"Igri Bez Granici/Igra Bez Granica"	"Game Without Borders"	1	1	1	1	1	—	—	Igri bez granici/Igra bez granica
2008	"The Hardest Thing"		1	1	1	1	1	—	1	The Hardest Thing
2008	"My Little One" (feat. his nephew Kristijan)		—	—	—	—	—	—	—	The Hardest Thing
2010	"Još uvijek sanjam da smo zajedno"	"I Still Dream That We Are Together"	1	1	1	1	1	—	—	The Hardest Thing

An em dash (—) indicates that the single did not chart.

== See also ==
- Music of North Macedonia
- Toše Proeski Music School
- List of people who died in traffic collisions

Awards and achievements
Preceded by Karolina Gočeva with "Od nas zavisi"	Macedonia in the Eurovision Song Contest; 2004	Succeeded by Martin Vučić with "Make My Day"
Preceded by None	Beovizija winner 2003	Succeeded by Negative
