= Božilak =

Studio album by Toše Proeski
- Released: 2006
- Recorded: 2006
- Genre: Traditional Macedonian music
- Labels: Award, City Records, Dallas Records

Toše Proeski chronology
| Po tebe (2005) | Božilak (2006) | Igri bez granici (2007) |

Singles from Božilak
- 1. "Majka na Marika" Released: 2006; 2. "Jovano, Jovanke" Released: 2006; 3. "More sokol pie" Released: 2006; 4. "Se posvrši serbez Donka" Released: 2006; 5. "Zajdi, zajdi, jasno sonce" Released: 2006

Božilak (Macedonian: Божилак, lit. 'Rainbow') is the sixth studio album by the Macedonian singer Toše Proeski, released in Macedonian. The album comprises fourteen traditional Macedonian songs. It was released in Macedonia and subsequently in Serbia, Slovenia and Croatia.

== Production and release ==
Proeski recorded Božilak (Rainbow), which was published by Award Entertainment in Macedonia in 2006. It consists of fourteen traditional Macedonian songs, performed with a symphony orchestra. The arrangers of the songs were Ilija Pejovski, Saša Nikolovski and Soni Petrovski. The album was released in Croatia and Slovenia by Dallas Records and in Serbia by City Records.

== Track listing ==
1. Bor sadila moma Evgenija
2. Se posvrši serbez Donka
3. Ako odam vo Bitola
4. Jovano, Jovanke
5. Ajde slušaj, slušaj, kaleš bre Anǵo
6. More sokol pie
7. Ne si go prodavaj Koljo čiflikot
8. Si zaljubiv edno mome
9. Uči me majko, karaj me
10. So maki sum se rodil
11. Dejgidi ludi mladi godini
12. Nažalena nevesta
13. Zajdi, zajdi, jasno sonce
14. Majka na Marika dumaše

== Awards ==
Golden Lady Bug

- The Best Male Singer Of The Year
