= Antonija Šola =

Croatian musician, singer-songwriter and actress

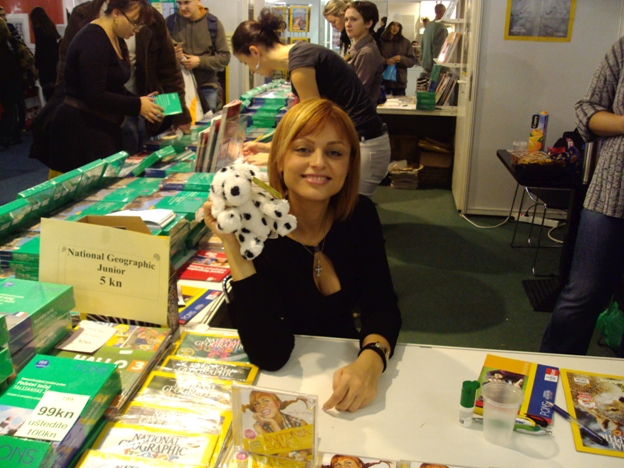

Background information
- Born: Antonija Šola; 5 June 1979 (age 47); Zagreb, SR Croatia, SFR Yugoslavia (present-day Croatia)
- Genres: Pop, pop-folk
- Occupations: Singer; songwriter; actress; businesswoman
- Instruments: Vocals; guitar; piano
- Years active: 2003–present
- Labels: Dallas Records; Croatia Records
- Website: http://www.antonijasola.com/

Antonija Šola (pronounced [antônija ʃôla]; born 5 June 1979) is a Croatian musician, singer-songwriter, lyricist, actress and music producer. She is known for playing a main role of "Tina Bauer-Fijan" in first Croatian soap opera Zabranjena ljubav (2004–2008). In addition to her role in the series, she composed and wrote songs, and wrote the lyrics of the series' theme song. After a role in the series, she started her musician career, while also has worked on songs and album with numerous artists of Balkan Region.

For her authorial-songwriting work she has received numerous audience and profession awards. Many songs Šola wrote are considered to be among the greatest hits of all time in the Balkans. She was also widely considered one of the most admired Croatian lyricists. Šola served as the main author of more than 350 songs.

== Life and career ==
=== 1979–2002: Early life and education ===
Born in Zagreb, to Kaja Ivanda and Marko Šola, both whom hailed from Tomislavgrad Prisoje, Bosnia and Herzegovina, she graduated sociology and Croatian culture at the same time turning to show business. In 1998, she won the regional beauty contest of Miss Croatia as Miss Istria and Kvarner. Šola graduated master's degree at the Croatian Studies in Zagreb, majoring in sociology and Croatian culture.

=== 2003–2008: Zabranjena ljubav and music beginnings ===
Before starring in the series, Šola shot a music video and commercial with Boris Dmitrović for brand Podravka. He persuaded her to go to the casting for the then newly formed series Zabranjena ljubav. She then got the main role of villain "Tina Bauer", which she was featured in from 2004 to 2008 (610 episodes). For that soap opera she wrote the lyrics of the intro song "Srce nije kamen", performed by Toše Proeski and also soundtrack for a series of her songs, that were later found on her debut studio album Anđele (2007). Šola achieved a gold, and later platinum certification for the album. Also it was declared one of the best-selling albums of 2007. In 2006, she published her song "Zovem da ti čujem glas", which became a great success in a short time, and later in the same year she published her first Ep album of the same name. Year later, Šola won the 1st place of the expert jury for the interpretation of the song "Zovem da ti čujem glas" at the international festival "Song of Summer" in Slovenia. Šola participated on Toše Proeski's most successful albums of all time in ex-Yugoslavia: Po tebe (2004) and Igri bez granici (2007), where she wrote some of his greatest hits. In 2007 Šola also made a duet with Toše "Volim osmijeh tvoj". The duet they sang was a big success.

=== 2008–2013: Gdje je srce tu je dom and further success ===
She performed in the HRT Dora - the Croatian national competition for the Eurovision song contest - she was at Dora 2003, Dora 2007 and Dora 2008. In Dora 2008, Šola came in second with her song "Gdje je srce, tu je dom". The winner of the event was decided by the jury, and while Šola's performance won the largest support in the televoting audience, the jury sent Kraljevi Ulice and 75 Cents to the Eurovision contest in Belgrade, Serbia. Šola also then released her second studio album of the album of the same name, and also received a gold certification for the album. The songs from the album also reached high positions on the music charts. In 2005, Šola appears as an author at "Zadar Fest" with the song "Plovila mala barka" performed by Marina Tomašević and Vinko Coce, for which she received the award for Best Text. Šola won the 2008 Ohrid Fest with the Macedonian song "Božji pat", which was translated from her previous Croatian-language hit single, "Nebu pod oblak". She competed at the Croatian Radio Festival in 2005, 2007 and 2008, where 2005 she won awards for Best Debutant, and the song "Nek ti bude bolje bez mene", and 2008 won award for Best Pop Performer. In October 2008, Šola and her dance partner Hrvoje Kraševac participated on 3rd season of Ples sa zvijezdama, the Croatian version of Dancing with the Stars, and finished in 5h place.

She composed and recorded a song in collaboration with the tamburitza band Gazde, called "Milion poljubaca", which remained at the top of the charts in Croatia for a year and for which they were awarded the first prize for the most listened song in 2009 at the festival "Zlatne žice Slavonije" in Požega. At the festival in Mostar in 2009, she was awarded the Audience Award for the song "Ko lane ranjena". In 2010 she released her third studio album Zemlja sreće, which she intended for children and it was one of the most sought-after children's music album in that year. She was nominated for a Porin Award in the category Best Children's Album.

In addition to Toše Proeski and Toni Cetinski, Šola has worked with artists like Lepa Brena (for whom she co-wrote the song "Metak sa posvetom" with Petar Grašo for Brena's 2011 album Začarani krug). For work on the Brena's album, Šola was nominated for 2013 Porin Award in the category Best original vocal or instrumental composition for theater, film and / or TV.

In 2012, Šola held a concert at a city stadium in Macedonia, attended by 43,000 people, making her the first and only regional singer to ever fill the stadium. In the same year, Šola won the Gloria Award in the category Song of The Year, at the CMC Music Festival in Vodice for the song "Lagat ću". Same year, she participated in the Split Music Festival with same song, and also as author on the song "Brodolom", performed by Danijela Martinović. The song won award for the Public's Choiche. Later year Šola released her fourth studio album Nezgodna (2013), named after the song of the same name from the album. In addition to the title song, the album contains songs and singles that Šola has released in the last five years, as well as five brand new songs like "Nešto kao volim te", "Živa meta", "Nezgodna", "Žigolo" and others which in a short time occupied the radio airwaves and regional music top charts. Among the solo songs was a duet "Svaki dan je put", with Dražen Žerić Žera, which she performs at the Zagreb Festival '13. After the great success of the album, Antonija held promotions of the same and received gold certification as one of the best-selling albums in 2013.

=== 2014–present: Present work and projects ===
In 2014, Šola collaborated with the band Barabe for the song "Tvoja Baraba", which she also produced. In 2015, Šola released the single "Samo u parfemu", which was declared a Summer Hit of 2015 and varied in the top charts. Meantime, Šola went on an American tour with Mladen Grdović. The tour began with concerts in New York, with a packed Melrose Ballroom. After returning from a successful American tour in 2016, Šola released three more summer hits: "Budi lav", "Ljubi se žmireći" and "Volimo se volimo". In December of the same year, he released the Christmas song "Usreći srce".

In 2017, Šola releases her single "Dok slušam radio", which she wrote for project "Radijsko srce". The song has been declared the anthem of the entire project. It was music - concert tour in which, in addition to Šola, musicians such as Damir Kedzo, Tony Cetinski, Pravila Igre and more. Same year Šola has released a song entitled "Tvoja", for the end of 2017 and the beginning of the new 2018. Šola is also announcing a new solo fifth album in preparation under the release of Croatia Records for spring 2018.

In the summer of 2018, Šola released the song "Bitango moja". In December 2018, Šola released her first Christmas album titled Sretan Božić ljubavi, in a pop acoustic production. The main single from the album is "Mir u duši".

In the summer of 2019, she released her single "Oči boje oceana". With the song, Šola was nominated for 2020 Music Awards Ceremony - the most popular balkan regional music awards, in the category of Best Pop-folk song, and thus entered the top 5 most listened songs in Serbia. To find her numerous and most represented hits such as "Samo u parfemu", "Tvoja", "Dok slušam radio","Bitango moja" and many others. Also in the same year, Šola lent her voice to the character of "Wanda" for the Croatian dubbing of the cartoon The Queen's Corgi.

In 2020, Šola releases single, "Cijena prave ljubavi" featuring Croatian singer from band 'Vigor' Mario Roth. The song had the biggest jump of all and ended up at No. 1 on the regional charts and stayed there for a month. Šola and Mario win the Cesarica Award according to the audience's choice. In July 2020, Šola also released song "Ponovo", which regained the music charts and was declared the most positive song on the stage. After eight years, Šola was supposed to perform at the CMC Festival again, but was postponed due to COVID-19 pandemic. Although the festival was not held, Šola's song ended up on the album as part of the festival as one of the most listened. In December of same year, she also released song called "Javna tajna", which already occupied the radio airwaves in a short period of time and had the biggest jump on the national top chart.

== Discography ==
=== Studio albums ===
- Anđele - (2007)
- Gdje je srce tu je dom - (2008)
- Zemlja sreće - (2009)
- Nezgodna - (2013)
- Sretan Božić ljubavi - (2018)

EPs

- Zovem da ti čujem glas - (2006)

== Other ventures ==
In May 2017, Šola founded her merch of t-shirts with written lyrics of her songs like: "Volim osmijeh Tvoj", "Zovem da ti čujem glas", "Srce nije kamen" and more. In November 2018, Šola joined the political party "Snaga" which fights against bankers. In September 2019, Šola launched her perfume, the first from the collection for men and women called "Ocean".

=== Activism ===
Through her concert performances and work, Šola has supported many humanitarian organizations such as "RTL pomaže djeci" of RTL Television, and the associations "DUH" and "MI" from Nova Gradiška, for which she wrote a song in collaboration with Tomislav Jakobović and Josip Jandrijević entitled "Djeca rođena za sreću". She received letters of thanks for promoting solidarity and humanitarian action as well as for supporting various educational and volunteer projects. She participated in the association to help the Caritas Home for Women and Children - Victims of Domestic Violence in Rijeka.

Šola received a letter of thanks from the Terry Fox Association under the auspices of the Canadian Embassy in Zagreb, and humanitarian association. Šola participants in DM's action "Volim osmijeh tvoj" and under the auspices of the Ministry of Health and Social Welfare Croatia. She also often uses social media as a platform to positively influence the lives of people around her.

== Filmography ==
Title	Year	Role	Notes
Zabranjena ljubav	2004–2008	Tina Bauer Fijan	(TV series; 4 seasons; 805 episodes)
Nad lipom 35	2007–2008	Herself	(TV Series; 4 episodes)
Ples sa zvijezdama	2008	Herself	(TV show; Contestant on season 3)
The Queen's Corgi	2019	Wanda	(Animated film; voice dubbing in Croatian)

== Awards and nominations ==
During her solo career, Šola has received numerous awards. She has received platinum, gold and silver certifications for her studio albums by the Croatian Phonographic Association. As an author-songwriter for working on the albums of other regional singers she received gold, platinum and diamond certifications.

Year	Association	Category	Nominee / work	Result	Ref.
2005	Oni Dolaze Festival	Best Debutant	Herself	Won	
2005	Zadar Fest	Public's Choice (As Songwriter)	"Plovila mala barka"	Won	
2006	ZAMP Award	The Most Aired Song (As Songwriter)	"Srce nije kamen"	Won	
2007	Grand Prix - Croatian Radio Festival	The Most Aired Song (As Songwriter)	"Veži me za sebe"	Won	
2007	Grand Prix - Croatian Radio Festival	Best pop-rock Song	"Anđele"	Nominated	
2007	Slovenia Grosupje Festival	Song of The Summer	"Zovem da ti čujem glas"	Won	
2008	Grand Prix - Croatian Radio Festival	Song of The Year	"Nebu pod oblak"	Won	
2008	Grand Prix - Croatian Radio Festival	Best Pop Artist	Herself	Won	
2008	Grand Pix - Ohrid Festival	Best Interpretation	"Božji pat"	Won	
2009	Melodije Mostara	Public's Choice	"Ko lane ranjena"	Won	
2009	Aurea Festival	Song of the Year	"Milijun poljubaca"	Won	
2010	ZAMP Award	The most Performed Song	"Usne na usne"	Won	
2010	Porin	Best Children's Album	"Zemlja sreće"	Nominated	
2010	Porin	Best-selling Children's Album	"Zemlja sreće"	Awarded	
2012	CMC Festival	Song of the Year	"Lagat ću"	Won	
2012	Split Music Festival	Public's Choice (As Songwriter)	"Brodolom"	Won	
2013	Porin	Best original vocal or instrumental composition for theater, film and / or TV	"Začarani krug"	Nominated	
2013	Kutjevo Festival	Song of the Year (As Songwriter)	"Sedmica"	Won	
2020	2nd Music Awards Ceremony	Best pop-folk Song	"Oči boje oceana"	Nominated	
2020	Cesarica	Song of the Month	"Cijena prave ljubavi"	Won	
2021	CMC/HDU Award (Ritam zabavne glazbe)	Best pop-folk Hit	"Cijena prave ljubavi"	Won	
