= Sinot Božji =

Studio album by Toše Proeski
- Released: June 2000
- Recorded: 1999–2000
- Genre: Pop
- Label: Avalon Production

Toše Proeski chronology
Nekade vo noḱta (1999)	Sinot Božji (2000)	Ako me pogledneš vo oči (2002)

Singles from Sinot Božji
- 1. "Sinot Božji" Released: 2000; 2. "Vo kosi da ti spijam" Released: 2000; 3. "Izlaži me uste ednaš" Released: 2000; 4. "Tajno moja" Released: 2000, 2001; 5. "Nemir" Released: 2000, 2001

Sinot Božji (Macedonian: Синот Божји) is the second studio album by the famous Macedonian singer Toše Proeski. The album was released in Macedonia by Avalon Production and FR Yugoslavia by BK Sound.

== Release ==
Proeski's second album Sinot Božji (The Son of God), was released by Avalon Production in June 2000. Serbian production house BK Sound released the album throughout former Yugoslavia after buying the rights.

== Track listing ==
1. "Sinot Božji" (Son of God)
2. "Nemir" (Restless)
3. "Noḱna igra" (Night Game)
4. "Vo kosi da ti spijam" (To Sleep in Your Hair)
5. "Kazna moja si ti" (You are my Punishment)
6. "Izlaži me uste ednaš" (Lie to Me Once Again)
7. "Iluzija" (Illusion)
8. "Solzi pravat zlaten prsten" (Tears are Making a Golden Ring)
9. "Tajno moja" (My Secret)

== Release history ==
Country	Date
Republic of Macedonia	2000
Federal Republic of Yugoslavia	2001

== Chart positions ==
Year	Song	Chart positions
Year	Song	Macedonia
2000	"Vo kosi da ti spijam"	1
2000	"Sinot Božji"	1
2000	"Izlaži me uste ednaš"	1
2000/2001	"Tajno moja"	1

== Awards ==
Golden Ladybug of Popularity

- Best Male Vocalist of the Year
- Album of the Year
- Song of the Year (Tajno moja)

Slavjanski Bazar

- Grand Prix for the song "Iluzija" (Illusion)

Suncane skale

- Second place for the song "Tajno moja" (My Secret)
