= Slavka Maneva =

- Born: February 2, 1934; Skopje; North Macedonia
- Died: Skopje; North Macedonia; January 8, 2010
- Occupation: Author

Slavka Maneva (Macedonian: Славка Манева; February 2, 1934 – January 8, 2010) was a Macedonian writer and poet. She was born and died in Skopje, North Macedonia. She finished her literature studies at the Faculty of Philosophy at the University of Skopje, and has worked as a professor of Macedonian language and literature in the secondary schools Cvetan Dimov and Josip Broz Tito in Skopje. Her works have been translated into Serbian, Turkish, Albanian, Russian, Bulgarian, Polish, Armenian, Georgian and Lithuanian. She won the Vančo Nikoleski Award in 1996 for her book Pillows of Stars (Ѕвездени перничиња).

== Works ==
- Свирипиле (The Singing Bird)
- Џиџа (Marijuana)
- Камчето на сакањето (The Rock of Friendship)
- Волшебниот лифт (The Magic Elevator)
- Готварски сказни (Cook's Stories)
- Виножитото што пее (The Singing Rainbow)
- Од дедо Марковото торбуле (From Grandfather Marko's Bag)
- Приказни без крај (Endless Stories)
- Куќата на божилакот (The House of the Rainbow)
- Sвездени перничиња (Pillows of Stars)
