= Ako me pogledneš vo oči =

2002 album by Toše Proeski

Studio album by Toše Proeski
- Released: 25 October 2002
- Recorded: 2002
- Studio: Fase One Recording Studios
- Genre: Pop
- Language: Macedonian
- Label: Award

Toše Proeski chronology
Sinot Božji (2000)	Ako me pogledneš vo oči (2002)	Den za nas (2004)

Singles from Ako me pogledneš vo oči
- 1. "Ako me pogledneš vo oči" Released: 2002; 2. "Magija" Released: 2002; 3. "Nemaš ni blagodaram" Released: 2002; 4. "Soba za taga" Released: 2002; 5. "Studena" Released: 2002

Ako me pogledaš u oči

Studio album by Toše Proeski
- Released: 25 October 2002
- Genre: Pop
- Language: Serbian
- Label: RTV BK Telecom
- Producer: Phoebus

Toše Proeski chronology
Sinot Božji (2000)	Ako me pogledaš u oči (2002)	Dan za nas (2004)

Ako me pogledneš vo oči (Macedonian: Ако ме погледнеш во очи) is the third studio album by the Macedonian singer Toše Proeski. Two editions of the album have been released, the first in Macedonian language with aforementioned title in Macedonia and Bulgaria, and the second in Serbian language under the title Ako me pogledaš u oči (Serbian Cyrillic: Ако ме погледаш у очи) in FR Yugoslavia and Bosnia and Herzegovina.

== Development ==
=== Background ===
Proeski's third album with the title Ako me pogledneš vo oči (If You Look into My Eyes) was produced and recorded at Fase One Recording Studios in Athens, Greece. Most of the songs were written and produced by Phoebus and arranged by Manolis Vlachos. Several of the songs had been previously composed by Phoebus and Vlachos, originally released by Greek pop singers with Greek lyrics and musical arrangements almost identical to those used by Proeski. The album was recorded in two versions: Macedonian and Serbian.

The Serbian lyrics were written by Marina Tucaković, while Miodrag Vrčakovski was the writer for the Macedonian version. The album also features Esma Redžepova in the song Magija (Magic) and Harem III. Redžepova's portion is in Romani.

=== Promotion ===
The album was released in 2002. It was promoted in FR Yugoslavia, Macedonia, Bosnia and Herzegovina and Bulgaria. All five songs of the album were number one on the Macedonian charts.

== Track listing ==
1. "Ako me pogledneš vo oči/Ako me pogledaš u oči (If you look into my eyes) (Greek version: "I ipothesi mas ekkremei" by Giorgos Lempesis)
2. Soba za taga/Soba za tugu (Room for sorrow) (Greek version: "Sigkinonounta Doheia" by Dionisis Schinas)
3. Magija/Čini (feat. Esma) (Magic)
4. Hold Me Tight
5. Uste edna skala/Još jedan stepenik (One more step)
6. Mesto na zlostorot/Na mjesto zločina (Crime scene)
7. Limenka (A Can) (Greek version: "Taram taram tam" by Dionisis Schinas)
8. Studena/Ledena (A girl like ice) (Greek version: "Hristougenna" by Despina Vandi)
9. Nemaš ni Blagodaram/Meni hvala nijedno (You don't even thank me) (Greek version: "Oute ena efharisto" by Despina Vandi)
10. Luda mala (Greek version: "Mou tairiazeis" by Dionysis Sxonias
11. Limenka (club mix) (single track) (A Can)

== Chart positions ==
Year	Song	Chart positions
Year	Song	Macedonia
2002	"Nemas Ni Blagodaram"	1
2002	"Ako Me Pogledneš Vo Oči "	1
2002	"Studena"	1
2002	"Magija"	1
2002	"Soba Za Taga"	1

== Awards ==
Golden Ladybug of Popularity

- Best Male Vocalist of the Year
- Album of the Year
- Song of the Year (Nemas Ni Blagodaram)
