= Igri bez granici =

Studio album by Toše Proeski
- Released: August 2007
- Recorded: 2006–2007
- Genres: Pop, pop-rock
- Label: City Records

Toše Proeski chronology
Božilak (2006)	Igri bez granici (2007)	The Hardest Thing (2009)

Singles from Igri bez granici
- 1. "Srce nije kamen" Released: 2006; 2. "Volim osmijeh tvoj" Released: 2007; 3. "Veži me za sebe" Released: 2007; 4. "Igri bez granici" Released: 2007; 5. "Bože, čuvaj ja od zlo" Released: 2007

Igri bez granici (Macedonian: Игри без граници) is the seventh studio album by the famous Macedonian singer Toše Proeski. The album was released in Macedonia and subsequently in Bosnia and Herzegovina, Croatia, Montenegro, Serbia and Slovenia under the Serbo-Croatian language title Igra bez granica (Serbo-Croatian Cyrillic: Игра без граница).

== Production and release ==
The team behind the recordings on the album included Nikša Bratoš, Miro Buljan, Miroslav Rus, Antonija Šola, Vesna Malinova and Zoran Leković. Many of the songs of the album were initially written in Serbo-Croatian, and translated into Macedonian for the Macedonian-language release afterwards. The album Igri bez granici (Games without borders) was released in August 2007. In Macedonia, the album was released as Igri bez granici in Macedonian by Award Entertainment, and in Serbia, Croatia, Bosnia and Herzegovina, Montenegro and Slovenia as Igra bez granica in Serbo-Croatian by City Records.

While promoting the album in September 2007, Proeski said: "This is my best album so far". It was the last album before Proeski's death. The album was released in a vinyl record in 2026.

== Track listing ==
1. "Duša ostana" (The Soul Remained)
  music: Miro Buljan
  arrangement: Miro Buljan
  lyrics: Vesna Malinova
2. "Nikoj kako tebe ne baknuva" (No One Kisses Like You)
  music: Srđan Simić Kamba
  arrangement: Nikša Bratoš
  lyrics: Vesna Malinova
3. "Bože, čuvaj ja od zlo" (God, Keep Her Away From Malice)
  music: Miro Buljan
  arrangement: Miro Buljan
  lyrics: Vesna Malinova
4. "Mesečina" (Moonlight)
  music: Toše Proeski
  arrangement: Toše Proeski
  lyrics: Vesna Malinova
5. "Igri bez granici" (Games Without Borders)
  music: Miroslav Rus
  arrangement: Nikša Bratoš
  lyrics: Vlado Janevski
6. "Sreḱna li si ti" (Are You Happy)
  music: Miro Buljan
  arrangement: Miro Buljan
  lyrics: Vesna Malinova
7. "Najdraga moja" (My Dearest)
  music: Zoran Leković
  arrangement: Nikša Bratoš
  lyrics: Vesna Malinova
8. "Jas ne sum vinoven" (It's not my fault)
  music: Miroslav Rus
  arrangement: Nikša Bratoš
  lyrics: Vesna Malinova
9. "Creša" (Cherry Tree)
  music: Miroslav Rus
  arrangement: Nikša Bratoš
  lyrics: Vesna Malinova

=== Single tracks ===
1. "Volim osmijeh tvoj" ft. Antonija Šola (I Love Your Smile)
  music: Miro Buljan
  arrangement: Miro Buljan
  lyrics: Antonija Šola
2. "Veži me za sebe" (Bind Me to Yourself)
  music: Miro Buljan
  arrangement: Miro Buljan
  lyrics: Antonija Šola
3. "Ostala si uvijek ista" (You remained always the same)
  music: Đorđe Novković
  arrangement: Nikša Bratoš
  lyrics: Željko Sabol
4. "Srce nije kamen" (The Heart Isn't Made of Stone)
  music: Miro Buljan
  arrangement: Miro Buljan
  lyrics: Antonija Šola
5. "Nesanica" (Insomnia)
  music: Dejan Ivanović
  arrangement: Nikša Bratoš
  lyrics: Dejan Ivanović
6. "Nesanica (remix)" (Insomnia)
  music: Dejan Ivanović
  arrangement: Nikša Bratoš
  lyrics: Dejan Ivanović
7. "Feeling Good"
  music: Anthony Newley and Leslie Bricusse
  arrangement: Ognen Kadmon
  lyrics: Anthony Newley and Leslie Bricusse
8. "Moja (Slovenian version)"
  music: Miro Buljan
  arrangement: Miro Buljan
  lyrics: Nina Sever

== Charts ==
Chart (2007)	Peak position
Croatian Albums (Toplista)	1
