= Mitevski =

Mitevski (Cyrillic: Митевска) is a Slavic masculine surname, its feminine counterpart is Mitevska. It may refer to

- Aleksandar Mitevski, Macedonian singer-songwriter
- Goran Mitevski, Macedonian politician
- Labina Mitevska (born 1975), Macedonian actress
