= Po tebe =

- Po tebe cover

Studio album by Toše Proeski
- Released: 2005
- Recorded: 2004–2005
- Genres: Pop; pop rock
- Label: Award

Toše Proeski chronology
Den za nas (2004)	Po tebe (2005)	Božilak (2006)

Serbian edition
- Pratim te cover

Singles from Po tebe
- 1. "Po tebe" Released: 2005; 2. "Koj li ti grize obrazi" Released: 2005; 3. "Lagala nas mala" Released: 2005; 4. "Krajnje vrijeme" Released: 2005; 5. "Za ovoj svet" Released: 2005

Po tebe (Macedonian: По тебе) is the fifth studio album by the Macedonian singer Toše Proeski. The album was released in Macedonia, Bulgaria, Serbia and Montenegro, Bosnia and Herzegovina, Croatia and Slovenia. In Serbian, the album is titled Pratim te (Serbian Cyrillic: Пратим те).

== Release ==
In 2005, Tose Proeski released his fifth album Po tebe (After you) throughout the former Yugoslavia. 170,000 copies of the album were distributed to Macedonia, Bosnia and Herzegovina, Serbia and Montenegro and Bulgaria where the songs Koj li ti grize obrazi and Lagala nas mala became huge hits. From the album Toše has video released the hits: "Po tebe", "Koj li ti grize obrazi", "Lagala nas mala", Krajnje vrijeme" and "Za ovoj svet". The Serbian version of the album is titled Pratim te (Following you). In 2006, it was named the best foreign album at Beovizija. It is among Proeski's most successful albums.

== Track listings ==
1. "Po tebe (After you)"
  music: Miro Buljan
  arrangement: Miro Buljan
  lyrics: Antonija Šola
  Translation: Vlado Janevski
2. "Žao mi je (I am sorry)"
  music: Leontina Vukomanović
  arrangement: Leontina Vukomanović
  lyrics: Leontina Vukomanović
3. "Rani na usnite (Wounds on the lips)"
  music: Miro Buljan
  arrangement: Miro Buljan
  lyrics: Vlado Janevski
4. "Slušaš li (Can you hear)"
  music: Toše Proeski
  arrangement: Toše Proeski
  lyrics: Vlado Janevski
5. "Malečka (Little one)"
  music: Toše Proeski
  arrangement: Bora Čorba
  lyrics: Toše Proeski
6. "Gromovi na duša (Thunders on soul)"
  music: Miro Buljan
  arrangement: Miro Buljan
  lyrics: Antonija Šola
7. "Lošo ti stoi (It looks bad on you)"
  music: Aleksandra Milutinović
  arrangement: Aleksandra Milutinović
  lyrics: Vlado Janevski
8. "Koj li ti grize obrazi (Who's biting your cheeks)"
  music: Miro Buljan
  arrangement: Miro Buljan
  lyrics: Vlado Janevski
9. "Polsko cveḱe (Meadow flower)"
  music: Toše Proeski
  arrangement: Toše Proeski
  lyrics: Toše Proeski
10. "Naj, naj (Most, most)"
  music: Zoran Đorđević
  arrangement: Zoran Đorđević
  lyrics: Vlado Janevski
11. "Za ovoj svet (This world)"
  music: Mladen Marković
  arrangement:Mladen Marković
  lyrics: Vesna Malinova

=== Single tracks ===
1. "Lagala nas mala" featuring Tony Cetinski (The little one lied to us)
  music: Miro Buljan
  arrangement: Miro Buljan
  lyrics: Nenad Ninčević
2. "This World"
  music: Mladen Marković
  arrangement: Mladen Marković
  lyrics: A. Klinar
3. "Krajnje vrijeme" featuring Anja Rupel (The time has come)
  music: A. Klinar
  arrangement: A. Klinar
  lyrics: /

== Charts ==
Chart (2006)	Peak position
Croatia Albums (HDU)	2
