= Den za nas =

2004 studio album by Toše Proeski

Studio album by Toše Proeski
- Released: 2004
- Recorded: 2003–2004
- Genre: Pop
- Language: Macedonian
- Label: Award

Toše Proeski chronology
Ako me pogledneš vo oči (2002)	Den za nas (2004)	Po tebe (2005)

Singles from Den za nas
- 1. "Velam lejdi" Released: 2004; 2. "Angel si ti / Life" Released: 2004; 3. "Ima li den za nas" Released: 2004

Dan za nas

Studio album by Toše Proeski
- Released: 2004
- Genre: Pop
- Language: Serbian

Toše Proeski chronology
Ako me pogledaš u oči (2002)	Dan za nas (2004)	Pratim te (2005)

Den za nas (Macedonian: Ден за нас, lit. 'A Day for Us') is the fourth studio album by Macedonian singer Toše Proeski, released in 2004. It contains all of the songs performed on the national final in order to select a song for the Eurovision Song Contest 2004 with which Proeski would represent Macedonia in the contest. The winning song was "Life" which qualified for the final and finished on the 14th place in the final. Some extra songs such as "Dzvezdo Severnice", "Me sakaš so zborovi", "Ima li den za nas" and others were recorded especially for the album.

== Release ==
In 2004, Proeski released the album Den za nas (A Day for Us) in two CDs. Proeski also released a Serbian version of the album titled Dan za nas (Serbian Cyrillic: Дан за нас). English versions of seven songs have been also made but they are unpublished.

== Track listing ==
(Titles are listed in Cyrillic script, in brackets are the Romanised script versions followed by a rough translation)

=== Macedonian ===
==== CD 1 ====
1. Ѕвездо Севернице (Džvezdo Severnice - Northern Star)
2. Ме Сакаш Со Зборови (Me Sakaš So Zborovi - You Love Me With Words)
3. Жена Балканска (Žena Balkanska - Female Balkan)
4. Има Ли Ден За Нас (Ima Li Den Za Nas - Is There a Day For Us)
5. Велам Лејди (Velam Lejdi - I Say Lady)
6. Никада (Nikada - Never)
7. Чија Си (Čija si - Whose Are You)
8. Life

==== CD 2 ====
1. Зошто отиде (Zošto Otide - Why did you go)
2. Ангел Си Ти (Angel Si Ti - You Are An Angel)
3. Далеку Од Мене (Daleku Od Mene - Far From Me)
4. Еј Синоока, Еј Босонога (Ej Sinooka, Ej Bosonoga - Hey Blue-eyed, Hey Barefoot)
5. Го лажам Секој Нов Рефрен (Go Lažam Sekoj Nov Refren - I Lie Every New Chorus)
6. Љубена (Ljubena - Beloved)
7. Парче од Европа (Parče Od Evropa - Piece of Europe)
8. Сон Егзотичен (Son Egzotičen - Exotic Dream)

=== Serbian ===
==== CD ====
1. Звездо севернице (Zvezdo severnice)
2. Када вараш ти (Kada varas ti; When you cheat)
3. Жена Валканска (Žena Balkanska)
4. Има ли дан за нас (Ima li dan za nas; Is there a day for us)
5. Кажем лејди (Kažem lejdi)
6. Никада (Nikada; Never)
7. Чија си (Čija si; Whose are you)
8. Life
9. Погледај у мене (Pogledaj u mene; Look at me)
10. Сан егзотичан (San egzotičan; Exotic dream)
11. Опрости (Oprosti; Forgive)
12. Што си отишла (Sto si otišla; Why did you leave)
13. Хеј плавоока, хеј босонога (Hej plavooka, hej bosonoga)
14. Кад срце плати стари дуг (Kad srce plati stari dug; When the heart pays an old debt)

== Charts ==
Chart (2006)	Peak position
Croatia International Albums (HDU)	3
