= Paskal Sotirovski =

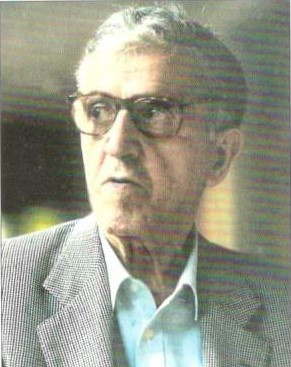
Portrait of Paskal Sotirovski

Paskal Sotirovski, (Macedonian: Паскал Сотировски; 23 November 1927 – 20 January 2003) was a Macedonian astrophysicist, specializing in solar physics.

== Education ==
Sotirovski was born in the village of Vrben in 1927.

Paskal finished primary school in Macedonia. He continued his education in Gornji Milanovac (in Serbia) where he finished three grades of the high school. Eventually, he graduated from the Educational School in Belgrade.

Sotirovski spent some years as a school teacher in Bela Crkva, but in 1950 he enrolled as a regular student at the Faculty of Philosophy and Department of Physics at the Ss. Cyril and Methodius University of Skopje. He graduated in 1956 and started teaching physics at the Josip Broz Tito High School in Skopje.

In 1961, Sotirovski was employed as an assistant professor of astrophysics at the Faculty of Natural Sciences and Mathematics in Skopje. Then, he was sent at specialization in Sorbonne, Paris. In 1964 he graduated with a degree in astrophysics. In 1971 he defended his PhD thesis in solar physics, and obtained the highest mark possible.

== Career ==
After getting his PhD degree, Sotirovski became a member of the French National Center of Scientific Research He is also a member of the French Department of Solar and Planetary Astronomy and in 1991 he waselected to be a member of the Macedonian Academy of Sciences and Arts.

Sotirovski has his cabinet at the Meudon Observatory in Paris. As a scientist with international reputation he gave lectures in America, Japan, Russia, India etc. His scientific works were published in many journals and magazines around the world. He was able to speak fluently few world languages: English, French, German, Russian, as well as his mother tongue Macedonian.

== Foundation "Dr. Paskal Sotirovski" ==
In the 1990s Sotirovski established the foundation that bears his name and financially supports the young and talented Macedonian minds.
