= Andrijana Budimir =

Macedonian handball player

Andrijana Budimir is a former handball player. She is best known as being the love interest of Macedonian singer Toše Proeski in the period between 2001 and 2004. After a three-year hiatus, the two continued being in a relationship in 2007, after which they also started living together.

== Private life ==
Budimir revealed how Proeski brought her white flowers while they were together, which she now takes to his grave. Her doctor forbade her to go to his hometown of Kruševo because every time she would go, she would end up at the hospital. After his death, she locked down, was completely clad in black and lost a lot of weight, stopped wearing make-up, taking care of herself and going outside. She even stopped playing professional handball and tried to open a cosmetic salon, but that also did not cheer her up.

Since 2013, she continued with her life and married a horeca owner from Skopje who she received a son Maksim with the next year.

As of 2024, she serves as the trainer of the handball team in Skopje.
