= Gdje je srce tu je dom =

Studio album by Antonija Šola
- Released: 21 December 2008
- Recorded: 2007 – 2008
- Genres: Pop, pop rock
- Length: 50:22
- Label: Dallas Records

Antonija Šola chronology
Anđele (2007)	Gdje je srce tu je dom (2008)	Zemlja sreće (2009)

Gdje je srce tu je dom (English: Where the heart is, there is home) is the second studio album by Croatian singer-songwriter Antonija Šola, which was released in December 2008, by Dallas Records. The album was named after her hit from Dora 2008, where Šola had the most votes from the audience and almost represented Croatia at the Eurovision Song Contest 2008.

The album left a great commercial success and sold more than 15,000 copies, and Šola achieved a gold certification for the album.

== Track listing ==
1. Gdje Je Srce Tu Je Dom
2. Milijun Poljubaca - Remix
3. Zvijezdo
4. Bitanga i Princeza
5. Uzmi Mi Sve
6. Kažeš Zbogom
7. Ko Lane Ranjena
8. Prevelika Kazna
9. Veruvaj/Vjeruj
10. Slučajni Partneri
11. Usne Na Usne
12. Priča Za Laku Noć
13. XXX (Vrati Mi Se)
14. Mrva Jubavi
15. Kade Što E Srceto E Mojot Dom (Macedonian version of "Gdje Je Srce Tu Je Dom)
