= Javna tajna =

Single by Antonija Šola
- Released: 3 December 2020
- Recorded: 2020
- Genre: Pop
- Length: 3:27
- Label: Croatia Records
- Songwriters: Antonija Šola; Mario Regelja
- Producer: Matija Škalić

Antonija Šola singles chronology
"Ponovo" (2020)	"Javna tajna" (2020)	"-"

Music video
- "Javna tajna" on YouTube

"Javna tajna" is a song recorded by the Croatian singer Antonija Šola. It was released by Croatia Records on 3 December 2020. It was written by Mario Regelja and Šola, and produced by Matija Škalić.

== Commercial performance ==
"Javna tajna" had the highest entry of all the songs on the chart and debuted at number seven in the HR Top 40. After several weeks the song left the chart, but returned quickly to the top of the charts and had the biggest jump from 31st place to 16th, making Šola the first regional artist to ever achieve such success. The song also debuted at number two on the DMC Top List.

== Track listing ==
Digital download
No.	Title	Length
1.	"Javna tajna"	3:27

== Charts ==
Chart (2020)	Peak position
Croatia (DMC Top List)	2
Croatia (HR Top 40)	7

== Release history ==
Region	Date	Format	Label	Ref.
Croatia	3 December 2020	YouTube premiere	Croatia Records	
Various	4 December 2020	Digital download	Croatia Records	
