= Zoran Leković =

Serbian musician (born 1957)

- Born: 8 June 1957 (age 69); Belgrade, SFR Yugoslavia (now Serbia)
- Genres: Pop; Europop; synthpop; smooth jazz; theatre pop; rock and roll
- Occupations: Singer; songwriter; record producer; actor
- Instrument: Vocals
- Years active: 1962–present
- Label: PGP-RTB

Zoran Leković (Serbian: Зоран Лековић; born 8 June 1957) is a Serbian pop singer. He first rose to national prominence at the early age of 13 with First Prizes at the Sanremo Music Festival, Beogradsko Prolece Festival, and Golden Rose Festival in Portoroz with the song "Ljubomora" ('Jealousy'). A teen sensation who played for Yugoslav president Tito, he continued his stardom as a singer, producer, performer, author of lyrics and composition in the Yugoslav pop scene, with numerous published No.1 Hits, including that of "Niko, Niko" ('Nobody, Nobody'), "Snežana" and "Ona Je Najlepša" ('She's the Most Beautiful'). He has also produced numerous Eastern European pop stars, collecting many awards and generating a lot of airplay along the way. He is an alumnus of the Faculty of Dramatic Arts, Belgrade (where he graduated in Radio and Theatre Production).

== 1957–77: Early life and teen sensation ==
Born and raised in Belgrade, Serbia (then Yugoslavia), Leković began singing in Kolibri Choir in 1962 (at the age of 5). His first big solo performance with the choir was at Dom Sindikata. He performed alongside other stars including Arsen Dedić, Zdravko Čolić, Indexi, Oliver Dragojević, Lola Novaković, and others. The performance caught the attention of the great composer of children's music entertainment, Aleksandar Korac. With this collaboration, he became one of Serbia's biggest ever pop sensations while still in his teens. With almost 1,000 performances up to 1977, performances at festivals, TV appearances, awards and accolades, and pop hits, he was easily one of Serbia's biggest ever pop sensations while still in his teens. He also performed several times for Yugoslav president Josip Broz Tito, including for his birthday and during foreign delegation events).

== 1977–90: A change in style and performing in USSR ==
After returning from service in the Yugoslav National Army (1977–1978), Leković's style shifted to pop rock. As a Yugoslav star in the USSR, he held around 400 concerts up to 1986. He played to over a million people in a single tour through multiple cities including Moscow, St. Petersburg, and Novosibirsk. He also had concert and television appearances in all major cities of the then Soviet Union (Kyiv, Tallinn, Riga, Vilnius, Rostov, Sochi, Minsk, etc.). During this period, he also started acting in musicals with main roles in Popeye, Red Riding Hood, Hansel and Gretel, Cinderella and Koprive.

== 1990–2007: More success and transformation ==
After the breakup of Yugoslavia, the pop, jazz, and pop rock scene in the region struggled. The record label PGP-RTS, then managed by Đorđe Minkov, gathered old and new musical artists.

Leković wanted to give support to younger colleagues with the experience he had gained. He became active on the big festival scene once more, but now as a producer, performer, lyricist, and occasionally as a composer.

In 1991 and 1992, the first two songs that he wrote for singers of folk music, one sung by Biljana Jeftić ("Suzo Jedina" meaning 'My Only Tear') and the other sung by Slavko Banjac ("Zaspala mi dusa" meaning 'My Soul Fell Asleep') resulted in a large positive reaction from the viewers and the songs had a huge amount of airplay in the former Yugoslav nations.

In 1992, a group of enthusiasts led by Vojkan Borisavljević initiated the movement of the big music festival in Budva, Pjesma Mediterana in co-production with RTV CG and RTS. For 3 years in a row (1993–95), he appeared at this festival as the singer and writer of the songs "Ti si moj Bog" ('You Are My God'), which won Award for Best Interpretation; "Probudi se anđele" ('Wake Up Angel'), which won Award of the Audience; and "Cinila sis to ti drago" ('You Did as You Wished'), which won the Award for the Best Lyrics. In a period of three years, together with his wife, he prepared the second album, but this time as the lyricist, performer, and co-producer with the arranger Laza Ristovski. The album was called Reci mi ('Tell Me') published by PGP-RTS in 1993. One of the episodes of the popular TV show Muzički portreti ('Musical Portraits') was dedicated to this album. In 1996, in sales, he appeared with one more album, Linija dodira ('Line of Touch'), also published by PGP-RTS. On this album, as bonus tracks, there were previously published songs (with independent festival labels).

Beginning in 1993, Leković has been heavily involved in producing. He has produced and written lyrics for songs which appear in over thirty albums of different artists, many of which were hit songs and won several awards. He produced and wrote for almost all major performers of folk and pop music, that include Ogi Radivojević, Merima Njegomir, Adrijana Božović, Marija Serifović, Sanja Đorđević, Tose Proeski, Natasa Bekvalac, Goca Trzan, Koktel Bend, Jellena, Cakana, Ekstra Nena, Maja Odzaklijevska, and others.

== 2007–present: Actor and producer ==
Leković played Bishop Myriel in the play Les Misérables at the Madlenianum Opera and Theatre. The show premiered at BEMUS and so far has had an audience of over 20,000 people, with over fifty performances. Leković's success resulted in more roles such as now also playing Frank Crawley and Giles in the musical Rebecca, also at the Madlenianum Opera and Theatre.

Leković is still works as a producer, but has become very selective in his choice of projects. He also works alongside his wife, Nena Leković, a composer who has worked with numerous popstars. He has two children: Maya Leković, a singer, composer and producer who composed for pop stars, selling her first song at the age of thirteen. She now works in Amsterdam as the owner of her own music production agency, writing music for film and ad, and music for pop. Nemanja Leković who acted as Gavroche in Les Misérables and now studies TV and Film Production at the Faculty of Dramatic Arts, Belgrade.

== Discography ==
=== Albums ===
- 1972 Za Nas Dvoje PGP-RTS
- 1986 Patike Od Sedam Milja (with Suzana Mančić) PGP-RTS
- 1994 Reci Mi PGP-RTS
- 1996 Linija Dodira PGP-RTS

=== Singles ===
- 1971 "Ona Je Najlepša / Ona Me Voli" PGP-RTS
- 1971 "Niko, Niko" PGP-RTS
- 1972 "Sanija / Hej, Hej" PGP-RTS
- 1972 "Snežana / Život Je Lep" PGP-RTS
- 1973 "Koliba" PGP-RTS
- 1973 "Daj Mi Ruke Svoje" PGP-RTS
- 1973 "Nemoj Kriti Lice / Malena Moja" PGP-RTS
- 1975 "Ljubav Je Svud Oko Nas" PGP-RTS
- 1978 "Put Broj Dva" PGP-RTS
