= Josip Broz Tito High School of Skopje =

Coordinates: 41.9944°N 21.4261°E

Josip Broz Tito High School
- СУГС Гимназија "Јосип Броз Тито"
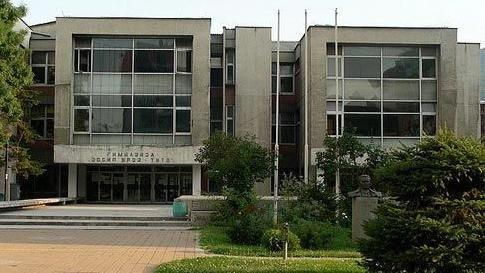

Location
- Dimitrija Chupovski bb 1000 Skopje; North Macedonia

Information
- School type: Public, Gymnasium
- Established: February 1, 1945
- School district: Centar, Skopje
- Enrollment: 1500
- Classes: 50
- Language: Main: Macedonian; Other: English (IB Diploma Programme), Turkish, German
- Website: josipbroztito.edu.mk

"Josip Broz Tito" High School (Macedonian: СУГС Гимназија "Јосип Броз Тито") is a state high school in the center of the capital of North Macedonia, Skopje. The school is located at a 5-minute-walk distance from the main square Macedonia. The school, which bears the name of Josip Broz Tito – the first president of Yugoslavia. It offers IB courses, as well as courses for the usual Matura programmes.

== Notable staff ==
- Paskal Sotirovski, astrophysicist

== Notable alumni ==
- Aleksandar Mitevski, singer and music producer
- Darko Dimitrov, film director
- Igor Dzhambazov, showman and actor
- Vlado Buchkovski, former prime minister of North Macedonia
