= Toše Proeski Music School =

State school in Bitola, North Macedonia

Coordinates: 41.0314°N 21.3298°E

- Drzavno muzicko uciliste
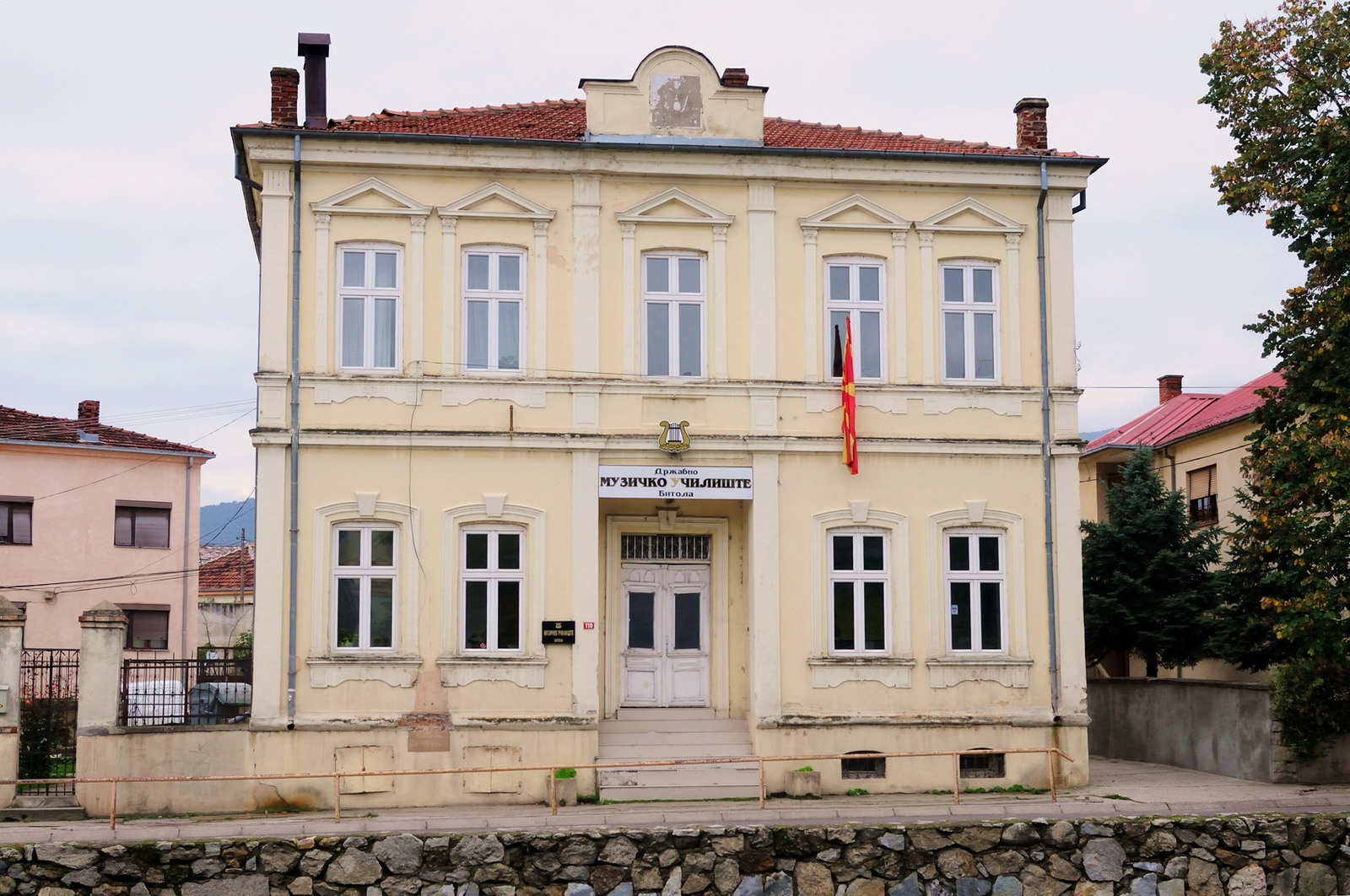
- North Macedonia

Information
- Type: State
- Founded: 1947

The Music School (Macedonian: Музичко Училиште – Битола, Muzičko Učilište – Bitola) is a state school that is located in Bitola, North Macedonia. Home to a population of over 1500 students, it is one of the most popular schools for music in the former Yugoslavia and Balkans. It provides a full education which includes solfege, music theory, and music history. It has produced some of the best-known musicians in the country such as Toše Proeski, Marijan Stojanovski, Lambe Alabakoski, Tanja Tzarovska, Karolina Gočeva, Dimitar Andonovski and Hristijan Spirovski.

== History of the school ==
This school was founded in 1947 and was located in the Radio Bitola building. There was much interest in this school during that time. There were three music degrees in the school: piano, theoretical and strings. The school was then called "Nizo Muzicko Uciliste-Bitola" or "Primary School for Music Education." In the school at that time, Kire Kostov and Slave Dimitrov were students. In 1980 the school name was changed to today's name and the location is near Marshal Tito Street in the centre of the city. The school carries approximately 1800 students, all from South Macedonia. A proportion of the school's enrollment comes from a further field; either to participate in special programs like theory degree, instrument degree or solo singer degree. Each of these degrees have many teachers and examiners at the end of every year. For example if you are in the piano degree then you will study Piano, Chamber Music, Sight reading, Solfege, Theory and English. If you are a solo singer, the preference is to learn the Italian Language and Solfege, respectively.

The school received a donation from the American government and constructed all buildings, especially at the Primary school for music.

== School structure ==
The school is constructed to educate students from Year 1 to Year 4. Each year the students have different teachers and subjects. It has four class coordinators, a director and a pedagogue.

== Admission ==
Students are of both genders and any sexuality, ethnicity, socio-economic status, age, geographic location or ability. This Centre selects the students in this way:

- Location

The school has no preference for where students physically reside, so long as they attend their classes.

== Notable alumni ==
- Nataša Stojanovska, pianist
- Marina Stojanovska, pianist
- Kire Kostov, composer
- Slave Dimitrov, singer and composer
- Tode Novačevski, composer
- Todor Svetiev, pianist
- Vladimir Kostov, violinist
- Marija Vrskova, pianist
