= The Hardest Thing (Toše Proeski song) =

Single by Tose Proeski

from the album The Hardest Thing
- Released: June 1, 2009
- Recorded: 2007
- Genre: Pop rock
- Length: 3:47
- Songwriter(s): Andy Wright

Tose Proeski singles chronology
"Igri Bez Granici" (2007)	"The Hardest Thing" (2009)

"The Hardest Thing" is the first posthumous single released by Macedonian pop musician, Toše Proeski, from his English-language album of the same name, The Hardest Thing. The song premiered on the 12th annual Croatian Radio Festival on 31 May 2008.

== Music video ==
The music video for the song was created by Slovenians; director Jani Černe, Matej Kavčnik and Igor Nardin from seven hours of pre-recorded material. It premiered on MTV Adria on 1 June 2008 and was subsequently shown on MTV Europe and the Macedonian Radio-Television network.

== Chart performance ==
The single peaked at number one on the MTV Adria Top 20 music chart and number three on the Croatian Top 20 Pop-Rock singles chart.
