= Zlatne žice Slavonije =

Croatia annual musical festival

Zlatne žice Slavonije (English: Golden Strings of Slavonia) is a music festival for both tambura and pop music held annually in Požega, Croatia. The modern festival has been held annually since 1990.

The first music festival in Požega began in 1969 and was held annually until 1981.

== Tambura winners ==
- 2005 - Slavonske lole for Ti si moje najmilije

== Pop music winners ==
- 2005 - Miroslav Škoro for Golubica
