= Kolibri Choir =

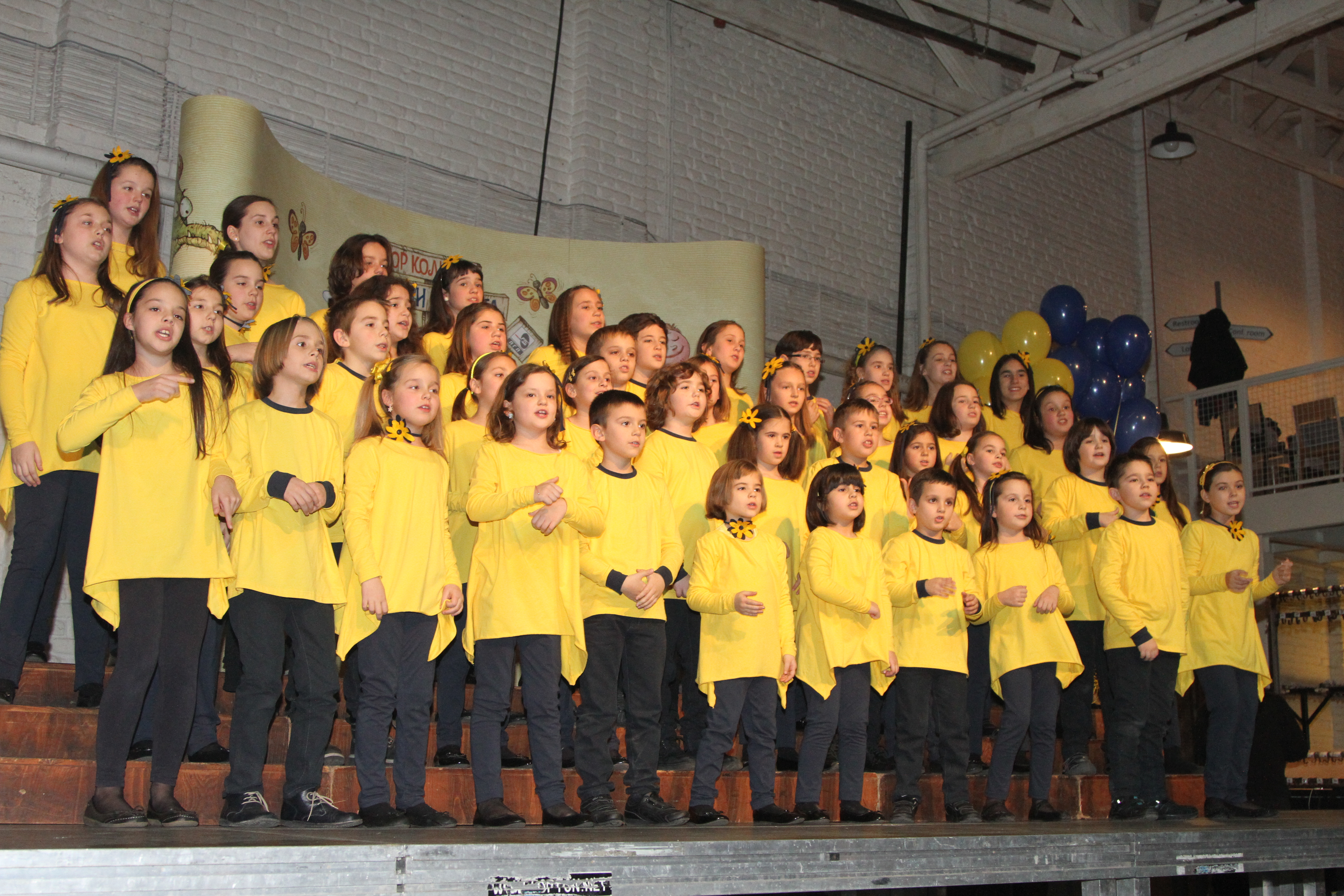
Kolibri Choir in 2013

RTS Children's Choir "Kolibri" (Serbian: Дечји хор РТС "Колибри" / Dečji Hor RTS „Kolibri”), known simply as the "Kolibri Choir" (Hor Kolibri / Хор Колибри) is a children's choir of the Radio Television of Serbia (RTS).

== History ==
The Children’s Choir "Kolibri" ("kolibri" meaning "hummingbirds" in Serbo-Croatian) was founded in 1963 by Milica Manojlović who conducted the ensemble within the Serbian Broadcasting Corporation for 44 years. During the last fifty years, the "Kolibri" Choir has given hundreds of concerts at home and abroad, taken part in radio dramas, and made regular appearances in television and films. The choir had 50 members as of 2013, all between 4 and 12 years old. The Choir has also been the launchpad of several pop stars in Serbia, such as teen sensation Zoran Leković. The Kolibri Choir performs at home and abroad, making regular appearances on television and in films. All their recordings are published by the Music Production of Serbian Radio Television (PGP RTS). "Kolibri" performed in Bolshoi Theatre in Musorgsky's opera "Boris Godunov. Kolibri and Milica Manojlović worked with Vlastimir Đuza Stojiljković, Ljubiša Bačić, Sedmorica Mladih, Dragan Laković, Oliver Dragojević, Bajaga, Minja Subota, Tanja Bošković, Riblja Čorba, Ljubiša Simić, Kemal Monteno, Bora Dugić and many other musicians, actors and artists in former Yugoslavia.

== Awards ==
- Diploma of Radio Belgrade for the contribution to the development of children's and youth music, the Golden Ring of the Serbian Cultural and Educational Union,
- Diploma of the Serbian Composer's Union for the contribution to the development of musical creativity, the "UNICEF Acknowledgement",
- Golden Syrian of the Radio Television of Belgrade (RTB) for the biggest yearly achievement of RTB, the "Silver Laureate Wreath" for work, the "Medal of Days of Mokranjac", the "Days of Mokranjac Award" and the "Zmaj Award".

== Discography ==
The Choir has recorded 19 singles and 42 LP records, seven audiotapes, four CDs and three video tapes, all released by PGP-RTS.

=== Albums ===
- Hoću u hor Kolibri
- 75 Years of Radio Belgrade
- "Molimo za finu tišinu" (1979)
- "Pred buđenje" (1983)
- Divine Liturgy
- Al' je lep dečiji svet
- Kolibri
- Commemoration to Vojislav Ilić
- 35. BEMUS
- "Kolibri planeta" (2013)
