= Bubamara Association of Persons with Disabilities =

Disability organization in Croatia

Bubamara Association of Persons with Disabilities Udruga osoba s invaliditetom Bubamara
- Official logo
- Abbreviation: Bubamara
- Formation: 21 December 1984
- Type: Non-Profit
- Legal status: NGO
- Headquarters: Vinkovci
- Location: Croatia
- Region served: Vukovar-Srijem County
- Members: >1,400
- Official language: Croatian language
- President: Tomislav Velić
- Website: bubamara.hr

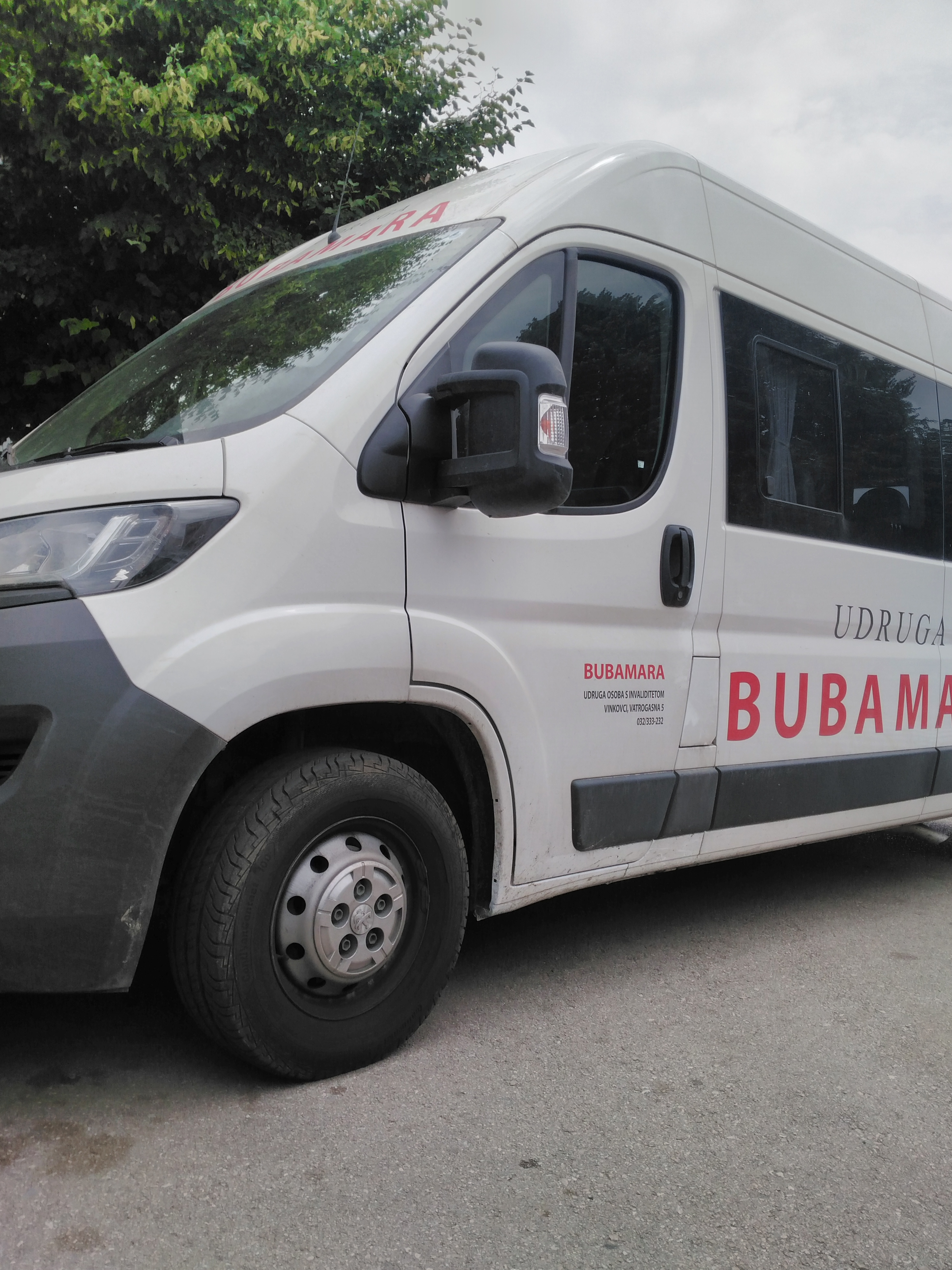
NGO's vehicle.

Bubamara Association of Persons with Disabilities, shortly Bubamara (literally:Ladybug) (Croatian: Udruga osoba s invaliditetom Bubamara) is a civil society organization founded in 1984 in Vinkovci, Croatia (then Socialist Federal Republic of Yugoslavia) with the aim of promotion of equal opportunities for persons with disabilities. With more than 1,400 members and over 200 employees, Bubamara is one of the largest civil society organizations in Croatia. It is specific on national level as it is the only organization that covers all kinds of disabilities through its activities. Over the years, the association has carried out over 150 projects supported by domestic and international institutions, organizations and individuals.

== History ==
The Bubamara Association of Persons with Disabilities was established on December 21, 1984. In 2012, the association received the former building of Ivan Mažuranić Elementary School in Vinkovci of 500 square meters in size. Božo Galić, the major of Vukovar-Srijem County, attended the opening ceremony.

== Activities ==
The activities of the association are supported by local, national and international partners. The Croatian Ministry of Demography, Family, Youth and Social Policy supported the association through the program "Joint Cooperation in the Prevention of Institutionalization" with HRK 333,667.00 on one side, and through successful projects applications for provision of personal assistants (HRK 432,542.00) and provision of teaching assistants (HRK 290,433.00). OTP Bank donated 5.000,00 kn to the association. RTL Television Helps Children supported association with "Play to Health" - HRK 50.000,00. City of Vinkovci provided HRK 80.000,00 for social-humanitarian projects and HRK 60,000 for teaching assistants. European Union funds supported the association work with € 250,000.00 and the United Nations Fund for Democracy with $ 174,900.00. Within the project of cross-border cooperation with Serbia (CBC program Croatia-Serbia 2007–2013), a project of 700,000 euros in values has been approved to Bubamara.
