= The Hardest Thing (album) =

Studio album by Toše Proeski
- Released: 25 January 2009
- Recorded: 2006–2007
- Genres: Rock, pop
- Length: 41:51
- Producer: Andy Wright

Toše Proeski chronology
Igri Bez Granici (2007)	The Hardest Thing (2009)

The Hardest Thing is the eighth, final and only posthumous studio album by Toše Proeski. It was released on 25 January 2009, shipping 120.000 copies to countries from the former Yugoslavia. Thereafter, the album was released to other countries within Europe. The album is distributed by Award Entertainment in the Republic of Macedonia and by City Records in Serbia.

The Hardest Thing is also the first album by Toše Proeski to feature entirely non-Macedonian language songs, consisting mostly of English language material but also containing an Italian language track titled "Aria". A remix of the song, featuring Gianna Nannini, also appears on the album. The album's title track and first single, "The Hardest Thing", achieved great chart success in Macedonia, Bosnia and Herzegovina, Croatia and Serbia. The second single, "My Little One", featuring Proeski's nephew, was released later in 2008.

== Development ==
Recording for the album took place in Ireland, Sweden, England and Jamaica. Video footage of the recording sessions were later assembled into a music video for "The Hardest Thing".

The track list was confirmed by several media outlets on the day of release. The posthumously released songs "Out of Control" and "Hold Me Tight" did not make the cut.

== Track listing ==
No.	Title	Writer(s)	Producer(s)	Length
1.	"Aria" (featuring Gianna Nannini)			4:19
2.	"The Hardest Thing"	Wayne Hector		3:48
3.	"Beautiful to Me"		Andy Wright	3:28
4.	"Guilty"	Wayne Hector		3:52
5.	"Glide"		Andy Wright	4:29
6.	"Don't Hurt the Ones You Love"			4:03
7.	"Separate Ways"		Andy Wright	4:51
8.	"Forever in a Day"		Andy Wright	3:55
9.	"My Little One" (featuring Kristijan)			4:52
10.	"Aria"			4:14
