= Sanja Đorđević =

Sanja Đorđević Сања Ђорђевић
- Born: Sanja Đorđević; 17 October 1969 (age 56); Pljevlja, SR Montenegro, SFR Yugoslavia
- Genres: Turbo-folk; pop-folk
- Occupation: Singer
- Years active: 1987–present

Sanja Đorđević (Serbian: Сања Ђорђевић; born 17 October 1969) is a Serbian turbo-folk singer best known for her hit-songs "Crveni lak" (2005), "Mutivoda" (1999) and "Svetlo crveno" (2008).

Born in 1969 in Pljevlja, she was brought up in Sarajevo. Her first album, Ko je ta, was released in 1987 by Diskoton label, while her breakthrough came in 2003. She took a four-year break between 2008 and 2013, which made her lose popularity. She is married to a former footballer, Petar, with whom she has a daughter.

== Discography ==
=== Studio albums ===
- Ko je ta (1987)
- Hej, hej (1993)
- Zorane (1995)
- Ima dana (1997)
- Janje umiljato (1998)
- Divlja ruža (1999)
- Pjevaj (2001)
- Da je meni drugi život (2002)
- Sanja (2003)
- Ti zaplakaćeš na mojoj strani kreveta (2004)
- Svetlo crveno (2008)

== See also ==
- Music of Montenegro
- turbo-folk
