= Aleksandar Mitevski =

Macedonian singer (born 1978)

Aleksandar Mitevski Александар Митевски
- Born: January 27, 1978 (age 48); Skopje, Macedonia, Yugoslavia (present-day North Macedonia)
- Occupations: Singer and Songwriter
- Years active: 1993-Present

Aleksandar Mitevski (Macedonian: Александар Митевски; born 27 January 1978) is a Macedonian songwriter and singer who represented the Republic of Macedonia in the Eurovision Song Contest 2015 as one of the writers of the song "Lisja esenski" performed by Daniel Kajmakoski.

== Biography ==
Mitevski was born on January 27, 1978, in Skopje. He first appeared on the Macedonian scene as a teenager in 1993 when he participated with the rap band "Okay Band" in the "Rap and Roll Festival" organized by the show "Ekran". In 1995 he started his solo career and as a debut single he wrote and released "the ballad Matador in the Heart". He appeared for the first time at the festivals in 1996 as an author, when at the Makfest in Shtip his song "Violin and guitar" performed by Dule and Koki won the first prize from the audience, and he is the author of the text. In 1997 he appears for the first and last time at Makfest with the song "15 to 2" and the same year in the edition of Makfest from Stip appears his debut cassette "You are sexy".

Otherwise, the material for this project was recorded in the studio "Enterprise" by Valentino Skenderovski, except for one topic which was recorded in the studio of Branko Popcevski.

In parallel with music, Mitevski studied journalism, and worked as a TV presenter on the MRTV show Pink Glasses. He was a radio host and part of the popular radio "Antenna5" team. The following songs, Letter (for which a remix was made) as well as 100% funky, Latino CD have greater success and greater media exposure. In 1999, he opened his first studio in AHA. He recorded the ballad Heart Tattooed in a duet with the famous businessman Trifun Kostovski. In parallel with the work on his second project, he wrote songs and composed for other performers and groups, of which they stand out: Ugro, Karolina Gocheva, Dario, Biba Dodeva, Tamara, New Boys and others. He released the album "Disco" in September 2001, and in December 2002, in the company of Dario and Ugro, the New Year's theme "Once a man lives" was realized.

In 2002 he wrote the sports anthem intended for the handball club Kometal, "Kometal champion" which encouraged the handball players and was widely accepted. In 2005 he wrote the song for the City of Skopje, "My City", which was followed by an excellent video by Cedo Popovski. In 2006 he released his last studio album "Kirilica" which contains the hits "Dusha Kaldrma", "Kirilica" and many others. In 2007 he recorded the ballad "Chinese Wall", and his last recorded song was "For Century and Centuries" from the summer of 2009, which featured many city figures and friends. He produced the instrumental album of Zoran Dzorlev - "Do not say lib" in 2009.

He has won several awards "Golden Ladybug of Popularity" for best radio commercials, and the last one for Dzorlev's album. On November 10, 2007, his original composition-anthem "Macedonia cheers for you" sung by the legendary Tose Proeski, was declared the official Macedonian sports anthem, shortly after the tragic death of the Macedonian favorite. Mitevski in 2011 with the help of the Tose Proeski Foundation produced Tose's adaptation of "Can you feel the love tonight" together with Zoran Dzorlev and the choir Zlatno Slavejce

As a graduate journalist from 2000 to 2010 he worked in the entertainment section of Utrinski Vesnik, and is now part of the Dnevnik 2 team with his columns, reviews and music comments.
