= Ilija Pejovski =

Macedonian composer, arranger and pianist

Ilija Pejovski (Macedonian: Илија Пејовски) (born 1947) is a Macedonian composer, arranger and pianist. One of the Macedonian composers who began to treat jazz professionally and evolve the genre of Macedonian Jazz, he has a broad portfolio of original music. A large part of his works were reserved for the big band ensembles, but he has also written symphonic and solo piano music as well as film music.

He initially studied music in Ljubljana and at the Faculty of Music in Skopje. In 1977, he graduated from Berklee College of Music in Boston. His background includes performances and collaborations with jazz musicians Thad Jones, Herb Pomeroy, Stan Getz, and Milcho Leviev. He has organized lectures and workshops in harmony, arranging and orchestration for students in Greece, Switzerland, Italy and the Republic of Macedonia and is the author of The Basics of Jazz Harmony (ProArts, 2004).

Pejovski was given the 2009 Trajko Prokopiev Award for lifetime achievement by the Macedonian Composers' Association (SOKOM).
