= Golden Ladybug of Popularity =

- Current: 23rd Golden Ladybug of Popularity
- Awarded for: Achievements in popular culture
- Country: North Macedonia
- Presented by: Radio Buba Mara
- First award: 1997
- Website: Official Zlatna bubamara website

Golden Ladybug of Popularity (Macedonian: Златна бубамара на популарноста, transliteration: Zlatna bubamara na popularnosta) also often abbreviated as Zlatna bubamara, is a Macedonian popular culture awards show. It is organized by Radio Buba Mara and held annually in Skopje. Since its establishment in 1997, the awards show recognizes the biggest achievements of the year in the field of Macedonian culture and features awards for several categories, including music, films, sports, theater and TV shows among others.

The 23rd show, held at the Boris Trajkovski Stadium in February 2020 was watched by 55% of the Macedonian population with which it became one of the most watched shows in the country.

== History and background ==
The first ceremony and inauguration of the show was held in 1997 by organizer Ranko Petrovic. The awards show is held annually in the capital of North Macedonia, Skopje. Presenters of the show usually use satire to discuss the socio-political situation in the country and other everyday events. Additionally, performances by music artists and dancers are also part of the show's repertoire.

== Awards ==
During the show, awards are given to the most popular works in several categories related to Macedonian popular culture including achievements in music, films, sports, TV shows and dance. The latest ceremony featured the following categories:

- Inclusive Theater Dance Play
- Most Popular Child TV Show
- Eternal Song
- Female Singer of the Year
- Male singer of the year
- Biggest Hit of the Year
- Sport Achievement
- Long-lasting Musical Values
- Theater Show
- Actor of the Year
- Actress of the Year
- Most Popular Regional Singer
- Lifelong Achievement in the Field of Music
- Long-lasting Musical Values in Ethno Music
- International Award for Lifetime Achievement
- Concert
- Lifelong Achievement in the Field of Movies
- Award for the First Trumpet
- Biggest International Success
- Ambassadors of Macedonian Culture
- Sport Success
- Music Producer
- TV actress
- Most Popular TV Project
- Long-lasting Values in Rock Music

== See also ==
- Culture of Macedonians (ethnic group)
- Macedonian cinema
- Music of North Macedonia
