= Elena Risteska discography =

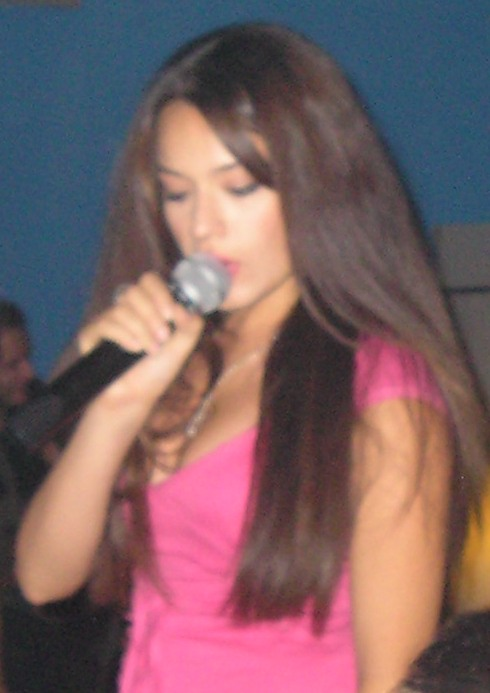
- Risteska performing in 2007
- Studio albums: 4
- Singles: 21
- Music videos: 13
- As featured artist: 3

Macedonian recording artist Elena Risteska has been included on three studio albums, nineteen singles and twelve music videos. As feature artist, she has three songs. She debuted on the Macedonian music scene with her first album Den i Nok in 2003. Her first single was "Ona drugoto" and with it she won the competition "Play - Search for a new star". With her single "Ninanajna" she represented Macedonia in the Eurovision Song Contest 2006 and it placed the 12th place in the final. Her first Serbian-language album is entitled Milioner; it was realized in year 2008. "Million Dollar Player" is the title of her first English-language single and it features Leroy Chambers. Nearly all the melodies are written by her producer Darko Dimitrov; for lyrics, she has collaborated with people like Kaliopi Bukle, Ognen Nedelkovski, Snežana Vukomanović and Aida Baraku. Elena is also a songwriter; her credits include "Dosta" (Enough) and "Sakam Po Dobro Da Te Pamtam" (I want to remember you for good).

== Albums ==
Year	Details
2003	Den i Nok: language: Macedonian; released: 2003; label: M2 Production; formats: CD, digital download
2006	192: language: Macedonian; released: December 26, 2006; label: M2 Production; formats: CD, digital download
2008	Milioner: language: Serbian; released: 2008; label: City records; formats: CD, digital download
2016	Bez Šminka: language: Macedonian; released: 2016; label: ER Music And Artist; format(s): CD

== Singles ==
Year	Song	Album
2003	"Ona Drugoto"	Den i Nok
2003	"Den i Nok"	Den i Nok
2003	"Raj i Pekol"	Den i Nok
2003	"Vo Tvojot Svet" (feat. Adnan)	Den i Nok
2003	"Ne Sakam Da Krijam"	Den i Nok
2004	"Pobeda Za Nas" (& Emil Arsov)	Pod isto nebo sme
2005	"Ni Na Nebo, Ni Na Zemja"	192 & Milioner
2006	"Ninanajna"	192 & Milioner
2006	"Ne Mogu"	Milioner
2006	"Esen Vo Mene"	192 & Milioner
2006	"Ljubav Nije Za Nas (collaboration with Regina)	Milioner
2007	"192"	192
2007	"Milioner" (ft. Leroy Chambers)	192
2007	"Kreveta Dva"	Milioner
2008	"Million Dollar Player" (ft. Leroy Chambers)	
2008	"Nekade Daleku" ("Bye, Bye")	192 & Milioner
2008	"More Sokol Pie"	Makedonija Zasekogaš
2008	"Sakam Da Te Galam" (with Parketi)	
2006/2009	"Usni Kako Temno Mastilo / Usne Boje Tamnog Mastila"	192 & Milioner
2009	"Dosta"	Bez Šminka
2010	"A Moževme"	Još Uvijek Sanjam Da Smo Zajedno
2010	"Sakam Po Dobro Da Te Pamtam"	Bez Šminka
2010	"Srekna Nova Godina"	
2011	"Najdobro Do Sega" (& Lambe Alabakovski)	Bez Šminka
2012	"Opasno Vreme"	Bez Šminka
2012	"Ne laži me"	Bez Šminka
2013	"Što si ti"	Bez Šminka
2015	"Doživotno"	Bez Šminka
2015	"Na ista adresa"	
2016	"Bez Šminka"	Bez Šminka

=== As a featured artist ===
Year	Song	Album
2006	"Na Nekoi Drugi Svetovi" (Lambe Alabakoski & Vrčak)	More od Solzi
2006	"Zaspana Ubavica" (Vrčak)	Vo Tvoeto Srce
2008	"Come and Get Me" (SnowBlack)	—N/a

== Music videos ==
Year	Title	Director(s)
2003	"Den i Nok"	Tomato Produkcija
2003	"Raj i Pekol"	Video Lab & Dejan Milicevic
2004	"Ne Sakam Da Krijam"	
2005	"Ni Na Nebo, Ni Na Zemja"	Tomato Produkcija
2006	"Ninanajna"	Tomato Produkcija
2006	"Esen Vo Mene"	Tomato Produkcija
2006	"Ljubav Nije Za Nas"	
2007	"Milioner"	Darko Andonovski
2008	"Million Dollar Player"	Corrino Media Group
2008	"Nekade Daleku" ("Bye, Bye")	Aleksandar Ristovski
2008	"Sakam Da Te Galam"	
2009	"Usni Kako Temno Mastilo / Usne Boje Tamnog Mastila"	
2009	"Dosta"	
2010	"Sakam Po Dobro Da Te Pamtam"	Rec Production
2011	"Najdobro Do Sega"	Tomato Produkcija
2012	"Opasno Vreme"	Daniel Joveski
2015	"Doživotno"	Tomato Produkcija
2019	"Srca Se Pogrese" (Danijela Karic)	—N/a
