= Makedonija Zasekogaš =

Македонија Засекогаш Makedonija Zasekogaš

Compilation album by Various artists
- Released: May 2008
- Recorded: 2008
- Genre: Traditional Macedonian Music
- Label: Agencija za mladi i sport na Makedonija (Agency for youth and sport of Macedonia)

Various artists chronology
Makedonija Naviva (2007)	Македонија Засекогаш; Makedonija Zasekogaš (2008)

Makedonija Zasekogaš (in Macedonian Cyrillic: Македонија Засекогаш, English translation: Macedonia Forever) often credited as Makedonija Zasekogash, is a project made by the Agency for youth and sport of Macedonia realized with an album. The album consists of 14 traditional Macedonian songs with new arrangement sung by the Macedonian music stars.

== Production history ==
The agency for youth and sport of Macedonia started the project under the motto of: "Да ги оживееме Македонските изворни песни" (English translation: "Let us revive the authentic Macedonian folk songs"). The right to participate in the project was preserved to citizens of the Republic of Macedonia. The applied composition had to be a traditional Macedonian song, but with new arrangement. The best remakes were awarded by being included in the compilation. 14 traditional songs were sung with new arrangement by the most famous Macedonian singers. The whole project finished with a big concert on the square Macedonia in Skopje.

== Track listing ==
1. "Vlado Janevski - Zemjo Makedonska"
  elaboration: Ante Pecotić & Vlado Janevski
  arrangement: Ante Pecotić & Vlado Janevski
  production: Ante Pecotić & Vlado Janevski
2. "Kaliopi - Narode makedonski"
  elaboration: Darko Dimitrov
  arrangement: Darko Dimitrov
  production: Darko Dimitrov
3. "Vlatko Stefanovski - Makedonsko devojče"
  elaboration: Vlatko Stefanovski
  arrangement: Vlatko Stefanovski
  production: Vlatko Stefanovski
4. "Boris Trajanov & Zoran DZorlev - Koga padna nad Pirina"
  elaboration: Zoran DZorlev
  arrangement: Aleksandar Mitevski
  production: Aleksandar Mitevski
5. "Karolina Gočeva, Garo & Tavitjan Brothers - Dafino vino crveno"
  elaboration: Tavitjan Brothers
  arrangement: Tavitjan Brothers
  production: Tavitjan Brothers
6. "Lambe Alabakovski - Jovano, Jovanke"
  elaboration: Darko Dimitrov
  arrangement: Darko Dimitrov
  production: Darko Dimitrov
7. "Sintezis - Lele Jano"
  elaboration: Sintezis
  arrangement: Sintezis
  production: Sintezis
8. "Aleksandar Mitevski - Poslušajte patrioti"
  elaboration: Zoran DZorlev
  arrangement: Aleksandar Mitevski
  production: Aleksandar Mitevski
9. "Sonja Tarčulovska - Sardisale Lešočkiot manastir"
  elaboration: Valentino Skenderovski
  arrangement: Valentino Skenderovski
  production: Valentino Skenderovski
10. "Elena Risteska - More Sokol Pie"
  elaboration: Darko Dimitrov
  arrangement: Darko Dimitrov
  production: Darko Dimitrov
11. "Sašo Gigov - Giš - I nie sme deca na Makedonija"
  elaboration: Robert Sazdov
  arrangement: Robert Sazdov
  production: Robert Sazdov
12. "Tamara Todevska, DJ Babura and Al Frose - So maki sum se rodila"
  elaboration: DJ Babura
  arrangement: DJ Babura
  production: Al Frose
13. "Dario - Slušam kaj šumat šumite"
  elaboration: Aleksandar Mitevski
  arrangement: Aleksandar Mitevski
  production: Aleksandar Mitevski
14. "Aleksandra Pileva & Jovan Jovanov - Nazad, nazad Kalino mome"
  elaboration: Jovan Jovanov
  arrangement: Jovan Jovanov
  production: Jovan Jovanov
