= Ljubav Nije Za Nas =

Song by Regina

from the album Ljubav nije za nas
- Released: 1991
- Recorded: 1991, Studio MPC
- Genre: pop rock
- Length: 3:50
- Label: Diskoton
- Songwriter(s): Aleksandar Čović, Alek Aleksov
- Producer(s): Raka Marić, Neno Jeleč

"Ljubav Nije Za Nas" (Cyrillic: Љубав Није За Нас, English translation: "Love is not for us") is a popular song of the Bosnian rock band Regina. The song was released as a track of the eponymous album in 1991.

== Background ==
The song was composed by the band's member Aleksandar Čović and the lyrics are written by Alek Aleksov. The song is sung in Bosnian language.

== 2006 version ==
"Ljubav Nije Za Nas"

Single by Elena Risteska & Regina

from the album Milioner and Sve Mogu Ja
- Released: 2007
- Recorded: 2006/2007
- Genre: Pop
- Length: 4:05
- Songwriter(s): Aleksandar Čović, Alek Aleksov
- Producer(s): Darko Dimitrov

Elena Risteska singles chronology
"192" (2006)	"'Ljubav Nije Za Nas'" (2006)	"Milioner" (2007)

Regina singles chronology
"Sve Mogu Ja" (2006)	"'Ljubav Nije Za Nas'" (2006)	"Bistra Voda" (2009)

In 2006, Regina re-recorded the song in duet with the Macedonian pop singer Elena Risteska. It became the second song by Elena (after her Eurovision entry Ninanajna) sang in a different language than Macedonian. The song was awarded as duet of the year on the famous Montenegrin music festival Suncane Skale.

=== Music video ===
The video is in black-white version with a lot of violinists in a hall. Elena and the lead singer of the band Davor Ebner are singing with microphones. All that represent a sadly concert with dark effects.

=== Lyrics ===
This version mostly retains the lyrics of the original version, with the exception of their adaptation for a mixed duet. Elena is starting the song saying that in that night she is feared and that she will lose him, saying that now she doesn't know how will she write a song and confess everything. Davor the leading singer of Regina is continuing saying that she lives in his dreams and there he can just kiss her lips and be her. The chorus is coming in which they say just the sentence "Love is not for us". After that Davor again repeat's his part. After that both of them are saying that tomorrow two tears will delete them from their lives and like they never meet themselves, will be strangers forever. They are continuing with the chorus.
