= Vo Tvoeto Srce =

Vo Tvoeto Srce In Your Heart

Studio album by Vrčak
- Released: May 2006
- Recorded: 2005 – 2006
- Genre: Pop-rap
- Producer: Darko Dimitrov

Vrčak chronology
Kako Da Pobegnam Od Sè	Vo Tvoeto Srce; In Your Heart (2006)	Na Sedmo Nebo (2009)

Singles from Vo Tvoeto Srce
- 1. "Vo Tvoeto Srce" Released: May 14, 2006; 2. "Na Sedmo Nebo" Released: October 22, 2006

Vo Tvoeto Srce (Macedonian: Во Твоето Срце, English: In Your Heart) is the second studio album by Macedonian pop-rap performer Vrčak. The album was a major success in the Macedonia following its release in 2006. The song "Vo Tvoeto Srce", featuring Andrej, debuted on the Macedonian Top 5 singles chart at #5 on May 14, 2006. The following week it placed at #3 before dropping back down to #5 for its last week on the chart. The album's second single, "Na Sedmo Nebo", a duet with Tamara, did considerably better as it debuted at #3 on the chart. In its second week on the chart, it peaked at #2 and, like the first single, remained on the chart for only three weeks, finishing off at #3.

== Track listings ==
1. "Vo Tvoeto Srce" (In Your Heart) (featuring Andrej of TNT)
2. "Ne Sum Takva" (I'm Not Like That) (featuring Gia)
3. "Spasete Me Drugari" (Save Me, My Friends) (featuring Lambe Alabakoski)
4. "Zaspana Ubavica" (Sleeping Beauty) (featuring Elena Risteska)
5. "Pop Pero (Father Pero)" (featuring Tamara Todevska)
6. "Baš Bi Sakal Da Znam" (I'd Really Like To Know) (featuring Jovan Jovanov)
7. "Čudni Pravila" (Strange Rules) (featuring Robert Bilbilov)
8. "Čao Za Kraj" (Bye For The End) (featuring Tuna)
9. "Ne Sum Sama" (I'm Not Alone) (featuring Tamara Todevska)
10. "Vozi Me" (Drive Me) (featuring Fani)
11. "Sedmo Nebo" (Seventh Heaven) (featuring Maja Sazdanovska)
12. "Tajnite Angeli" (The Secret Angels) (featuring Robert Bilbilov)
13. "Mars Napagja" (Mars Falls Upon Us) (featuring The Alien)
14. "Posledniot Den" (The Last Day)
15. "Den Po Den" (Day After Day) (featuring Andrijana Janevska)
16. "Kako Vremeto Da Stoi" (As If Time Is Standing Still) (featuring Andrijana Janevska & Daskal)
17. "Očite Nemaat Vera" (Eyes Have No Faith) (featuring Zapro Zaprov)
18. "Za Site Deca" (For All The Children) (featuring Jovan Jovanov)
19. "Tajnite Angeli (Remix)" (featuring Robert Bilbilov)

== Samples ==
- "Vo Tvoeto Srce" samples "I Need A Girl, Pt. 2" by Diddy.
- "Vozi Me" samples "Are You That Somebody?" by Aaliyah.
- "Ne Sum Takva" samples "Pari" from his debut album, which in turn samples "For the Love of Money" by The O'Jays.
- "Spasete me Drugari" samples "Si Mundet Kështu" by Tuna.
