= Nekade Daleku =

"Nekade Daleku Некаде Далеку Bye, Bye"

Single by Elena Risteska

from the album 192 & Milioner
- Released: May 2008
- Recorded: 2006/2008
- Genre: Pop, R&B
- Length: 4:18 (Macedonian version); 04:10 (Serbian version); 05:12 (Video version)
- Label: M2 Production, City Records
- Songwriters: Darko Dimitrov, Kaliopi, Aida Baraku
- Producer: Darko Dimitrov

Elena Risteska singles chronology
"Million Dollar Player" (2008)	"Nekade Daleku; Некаде Далеку; Bye, Bye" (2008)	"More Sokol Pie" (2008)

"Nekade Daleku" (in Macedonian: Некаде далеку, English translation: Somewhere far away} is a single by Macedonian singer-songwriter Elena Risteska. It was originally recorded in 2006 in Macedonian and included in her second studio album 192, but later in 2008 a Serbian version of the song was also recorded. The name of the Serbian version is "Bye, Bye" and it is included in Elena's first Serbian language album Milioner. Both versions had their official release in May 2008 with a music video.

== Release history ==
Country	Date	Version
Macedonia	May 2008	Macedonian
Bosnia and Herzegovina	May 2008	Serbian
Croatia	May 2008	Serbian
Montenegro	May 2008	Serbian
Serbia	May 2008	Serbian
