= Milioner =

Milioner (Cyrillic: Милионер) in South Slavic languages meaning 'Millionaire' may refer to:

- Milioner (album), an album by Macedonian singer Elena Risteska
- "Milioner" (song), a 2006/2008 single by Elena Risteska
