= Jovano Jovanke =

Balkan folk song

"Jovano, Jovanke" (Bulgarian: Йовано, Йованке; Macedonian: Јовано, Јованке, lit. 'Oh, Jovana, Oh, Little Jovana') is a traditional folk song originating from the region of Macedonia. It is popular in and frequently performed in North Macedonia, Bulgaria, and the Greek region of Macedonia. The song has also been adapted and performed in neighboring Balkan states such as Bosnia and Herzegovina, Serbia and Croatia. It is about two young lovers separated by their disapproving parents. The song mentions the Vardar river which runs through present-day North Macedonia and present-day Greece.

== Renditions ==
- Macedonian singer and songwriter Aleksandar Sarievski performed a traditional version of the song throughout his musical career (1946–2002).
- In 1967, Yugoslav beat band Zlatni Dečaci recorded a version of the song for Vladan Slijepčević's film Where to After the Rain?.
- In 1967, the song was performed by Esther & Abi Ofarim for their album 2 in 3.
- In 1968, Turkish singer Ajda Pekkan recorded a version of the song titled as "Ne Tadı Var Bu Dünyanın" with newly written lyrics in Turkish.
- In 1975, Yugoslav acoustic folk rock band Prošlo Vrijeme recorded a version of the song and released it on a 7-inch single with the song "Negdje".
- In 1985, German folk group Trio Farfarello performed "Jovano" on their debut album Farfarello.
- In 1986 Croatian and former Yugoslav hard rock band Osmi Putnik incorporated a part of the melody in their song "Jovana".
- In 1986, Macedonian and former Yugoslav jazz-fusion and rock band Leb i Sol produced an instrumental version of the song.
- In 1989, guitarist Dušan Bogdanović and harpist Georgia Kelly released an instrumental version of the song on their album A Journey Home.
- In 1991, Croatian singer and songwriter Branimir Štulić recorded song for his album Sevdah za Paulu Horvat. Later, in 2012, he recorded one more version in his home-studio in the Netherlands.
- In 1994, Macedonian and former Yugoslav band Anastasia included a part of the melody in the score "Coming Back Home 1" for the soundtrack of Before the Rain.
- In 1995 and 2006, Berlin-based world music band 17 Hippies released versions of the song on their albums Rock 'n' Roll 13 and Hippies Live in Berlin, respectively.
- In 1997 and 2003, Vienna-based world music band Nim Sofyan released versions of the song.
- In 1999, Romanian band Phoenix included a version of the song on their album Ora-Hora.
- In 1999, the Czech band Gothart included a version on their album Adio querida.
- In 2001, two pioneers of Celtic bouzouki, Roger Landes and Chipper Thompson, recorded an instrumental version on their album The Janissary Stomp.
- In 2003, New Zealand-based world music band Many Hands released a version of this song on their album Routes.
- In 2003, Polish band Kroke and the violinist Nigel Kennedy performed this song on their album East Meets East.
- In 2006, Macedonian singer Toše Proeski released a version of the song on his album Božilak. Proeski has frequently performed the song at live concerts.
- In 2007, Bulgarian entertainer Slavi Trifonov performed the song and filmed a patriotic video to accompany it, which recreates the Bulgarian victory in the Battle of Doiran during the First World War.
- In 2009, Kosovan Turk singer Suzan Kardeş and Turkish actress Şebnem Sönmez performed the song as "Yovano Yovanke". The song was also used in the Turkish television series Kırmızı Oda.
- In 2009, Croatian Istrian-based band Hot Club de Istra made a gypsy jazz arrangement of the song.
- In 2009, the melody of this song was used in the sixth sequel of the TV advertising campaign Macedonia Timeless.
- In 2011, Polish producer Marcin Wyrosek released a version of the song with Polish singer Kayah.
- In 2011, What Cheer? Brigade, a brass band based in Providence, Rhode Island, released a version of the song on their album Classy: Live in Pawtucket.
- In March 2014, the Slovenian vocal choir Perpetuum Jazzile released an a cappella arrangement of the song.
- In 2015, Croatian singer Nina Kraljić, who would represent Croatia in the Eurovision Song Contest 2016, performed the song live.
- In 2016, Italian musician Daniele Sepe released his album Capitan Capitone e i Fratelli della Costa which includes a version of the song featuring singer Carmine D'Aniello from the band 'O Rom on vocal duties.
- In 2017, the Serbian group Alice in WonderBand performed the song in arrangement for body percussion, vocals and didgeridoo on the television show Ja imam talenat!.
- In 2018, Howard Levy and Chris Siebold recorded the song live at Red Clay Music Foundry.

== See also ==
- Music of North Macedonia
- Music of Bulgaria
