= Opasno Vreme =

Single by Elena Risteska

from the album "Bez Šminka"
- Released: TBA (2012)
- Recorded: 2011–2012
- Genre: Pop, R&B, pop rock
- Length: 4:02
- Label: M2 Production
- Songwriter: Darko Dimitrov
- Producer: Darko Dimitrov

Elena Risteska singles chronology
"Najdobro Do Sega (Duet with Lambe Alabakovski)" (2011)	"Opasno Vreme" (2012)	"Ne laži me" (2012)

"Opasno Vreme" (Macedonian: Опасно Време, English translation: Dangerous Time) is a single by the Macedonian singer Elena Risteska. The single was recorded in 2011. Elena Risteska announced that the single will be released along with a music video.

== Background ==
After the huge success of "Sakam Po Dobro Da Te Pamtam", Elena started working on a new single. The album Opasno Vreme was recorded in 2011. Opasno Vreme will be the second single from her upcoming Macedonian album, which will be released in 2013. The video of the song was shot in October 2012. Both the single and the music video were released in the beginning of November.

== Music video ==
The music video for the song was shot in the middle of October 2012, and was released in November 2012. It was directed by Daniel Joveski and was filmed in a period span of 6 days, in various locations in Macedonia. The video is very reminiscent of the music video for "We Found Love" by pop-star Rihanna. Elena Risteska's partner/boyfriend in the video was played by Slavisa Kajevski.

== Release history ==
Country	Date	Version
Macedonia	November,2012	Macedonian
Bosnia and Herzegovina	November,2012	Macedonian
Croatia	November,2012	Macedonian
Montenegro	November,2012	Macedonian
Serbia	November,2012	Macedonian
