= Esen Vo Mene =

"Esen Vo Mene Есен во мене"

Single by Elena Risteska

from the album 192 & Milioner
- Released: 22 October 2006
- Recorded: 2006
- Genre: Pop
- Length: 4:19
- Label: M2 Production, City Records
- Songwriter(s): Darko Dimitrov, Kaliopi
- Producer(s): Darko Dimitrov

Elena Risteska singles chronology
"Ne Mogu" (2006)	"Esen Vo Mene; Есен во мене" (2006)	"192" (2007)

"Esen Vo Mene" (Macedonian: Есен во мене, English translation: "Autumn In Me") is a single by the Macedonian singer and song-writer Elena Risteska realized in 2006. It is the fourth single from her second studio album 192. Later in 2008 it was included in her Serbian language version of 192 called Milioner, but together with "Ninanajna" it was not re-recorded in Serbian.

== Background ==
After the Eurovision Song Contest 2006 Elena started to work on a new project. "Esen Vo Mene" was the pilot single that came out just two months before realizing the album 192. In 2008 it was included in the album Milioner that was actually the Serbian version of 192, but the song was not re-recorded in Serbian like most of the songs and stayed as it was originally in Macedonian.

== Production history ==
"Esen Vo Mene" is a pop–ballad. The author of the music is Elena's producer Darko Dimitrov and the lyrics were written by the Macedonian diva Kaliopi Bukle. For first time the song was presented on 9 October 2006 in the Macedonian TV show Vrteleška. Later on 21 October was realized with an official music video.

== Music video ==
The music video for the song was shot in September/October, 2006. Director of the video is Bane Popović together with Tomato Produkcija. It features a dark room in which Elena stays and performs during the whole video.

== Release history ==
Country	Date	Language
Macedonia	22 October 2006	Macedonian
