= Milioner (album) =

Milioner Милионер Millionaire
- Milioner album cover

Studio album by Elena Risteska
- Released: 2008
- Recorded: 2008
- Genre: Pop, R&B
- Length: 44:27
- Label: City Records

Elena Risteska chronology
192 (2006)	Milioner; Милионер; Millionaire (2008)	The Very Best of ... Elena Risteska (2009)

Singles from Milioner
- 1. "Ni Na Nebo, Ni Na Zemja" Released: 2005; 2. "Ninanajna" Released: 2006; 3. "Kreveta Dva" Released: 2008; 4. "Bye Bye" Released: 2008; 5. "Usne Boje Tamnog Mastila" Released: 2009

Back cover
- Back cover

Milioner is the third studio album by Macedonian pop musician, Elena Risteska. The album was released in Serbia by City Records in q2, 2008. The albums contains the same songs from the album 192, just sang in Serbian.

== Track listings ==
1. "92"
  music: Darko Dimitrov
  arrangement: Darko Dimitrov
  lyrics: Elena Risteska & Aida Baraku
2. "Milioner"
  music: Darko Dimitrov
  arrangement: Darko Dimitrov
  lyrics: Elena Risteska & Aida Baraku
3. "Kreveta Dva"
  music: Darko Dimitrov
  arrangement: Darko Dimitrov
  lyrics: Aida Baraku
4. "Bye, Bye"
  music: Darko Dimitrov
  arrangement: Darko Dimitrov
  lyrics: Aida Baraku
5. "Usne Boje Tamnog Mastila"
  music: Darko Dimitrov
  arrangement: Darko Dimitrov
  lyrics: Snezana Vukomanovic
6. "Esen Vo Mene"
  music: Darko Dimitrov
  arrangement: Darko Dimitrov
  lyrics: Kaliopi
7. "Romeo i Julija"
  music: Darko Dimitrov
  arrangement: Darko Dimitrov
  lyrics: Elena Risteska i Aida Baraku
8. "Ninanajna"
  music: Darko Dimitrov
  arrangement: Darko Dimitrov
  lyrics: Rade Vrčakovski
9. "Iskrene Suze"
  music: Darko Dimitrov
  arrangement: Darko Dimitrov
  lyrics: Elena Risteska
10. "Ne Mogu"
  music: Darko Dimitrov
  arrangement: Darko Dimitrov
  lyrics: Kaliopi
11. "Ni Na Nebo Ni Na Zemja"
  music: Darko Dimitrov
  arrangement: Darko Dimitrov
  lyrics: Aleksandar Ristovski
12. "Ljubav Nije Za Nas"
  music: Aleksandar Covic
  arrangement: Aleksandar Covic
  lyrics: Alek Aleksov

== Release history ==
Country	Date
Bosnia and Herzegovina	23 October 2008
Montenegro	23 October 2008
Serbia	23 October 2008
