= 192 (album) =

Studio album by Elena Risteska
- Released: December 26, 2006
- Recorded: 2006
- Genre: Pop, R&B
- Length: 44:27
- Label: M2 Production
- Producer: Darko Dimitrov, Rade Vrčakovski, Leroy Chambers

Elena Risteska chronology
Den i Nok (2003)	192 (2006)	Milioner (2008)

Singles from 192
- 1. "Ni Na Nebo, Ni Na Zemja" Released: July 13, 2005; 2. "Ninanajna" Released: March 4, 2006; 3. "Esen Vo Mene" Released: October 22, 2006; 4. "192" Released: January 14, 2007; 5. "Milioner" Released: May 13, 2007; 6. "Nekade Daleku" Released: 2008; 7. "Usni Kako Temno Mastilo" Released: January 21, 2009

192 (in Macedonian read as: Еден, девет, двa; meaning the Macedonian police number) is the second studio album by Macedonian pop musician, Elena Risteska. The album was released in Macedonia on December 26, 2006 by M2 Productions and has thus far spawned five Macedonian Top 5 singles—"Ninanajna", "Esen Vo Mene", "192", "Milioner" and "Usni Kako Temno Mastilo" three of which have ranked at #1.

== Background ==
After the release of her debut album Den i Nok in 2003, Risteska made a pause for 2 years on musical plan. In 2005 she realized the first song later included in the album "Ni Na Nebo, Ni Na Zemja" and with this song for first time she participated in the Montenegrin festival Sunčane Skale. With that she became well known on the Balkan stage.

On 4 March 2006 Elena Won the competition SkopjeFest or the Macedonian song selection for the coming Eurovision Song Contest. The song was called "Ninanajna" and technically was released as the second single from the album. The music of the song is written by Darko Dimitrov and Rade Vrčakovski wrote the lyrics. With the English-Macedonian version of the song Risteska represented North Macedonia on the Eurovision Song Contest 2006 held in Athens, Greece. In the Grand Final she placed 12th that used to be the best result that a Macedonian entry had ever achieved until 2019 (7th place).

Later in the summer 2006 she participated on Sunčane Skale with the song "Ne Mogu", the Serbo-Croatian version of "Ne Možam". In October 2006 she realized the single Esen Vo Mene and with the realization of this single she gave the news that her second studio album was upcoming. On the 26 December 2006 she finally realized 192.

== Track listings ==
No.	Title	Lyrics	Music	Length
1.	"Welcome"	Elena Risteska	Robert Bilbilov	2:08
2.	"192"	Elena Risteska	Darko Dimitrov	4:05
3.	"Milioner" (Millionaire)	Elena Risteska	Darko Dimitrov	3:54
4.	"Ima Li Kraj" (Is There an End)	Kaliopi	Darko Dimitrov	3:43
5.	"Nekade Daleku" (Somewhere far away)	Kaliopi	Darko Dimitrov	4:18
6.	"Ni Na Nebo, Ni Na Zemja" (Neither on Sky, Neither on Earth)	Aleksandar Ristovski- Princ	Darko Dimitrov	3:26
7.	"Esen Vo Mene" (Autumn In Me)	Kaliopi	Darko Dimitrov	4:19
8.	"Usni Kako Temno Mastilo" (Lips Like Dark Ink)	Ognen Nedelkovski	Darko Dimitrov	4:03
9.	"Romeo i Julija" (Romeo & Juliet)	Elena Risteska	Darko Dimitrov	4:10
10.	"Ninanajna"	Vrčak	Darko Dimitrov	3:03
11.	"Toa Što Plačam" (That For What I Cry)	Elena Risteska	Darko Dimitrov
12.	"Ne Možam" (I Can't)	Kaliopi	Darko Dimitrov	3:35

== Singles and music videos ==
- "Ni Na Nebo, Ni Na Zemja" is the first single from the album. With this single she debuted on the Balkan Stage on Sunčane Skale 2005. The video for the single was shot by "Tomato Production" in their studios in Skopje.
- "Ninanajna" represented Macedonia in the Eurovision Song Contest 2006. It placed 10th in the semi-final and 12th in the final that is the best result for Macedonia overall. The video for the song was again shot by "Tomato Production". The song has a Macedonian, English and English-Macedonian version. Various remixes of the song were realized.
- "Esen Vo Mene" is the third realized single from the album. The music is by her producer Darko Dimitrov and the lyrics are written by the Macedonian diva Kaliopi Bukle. The song was on the #1 position on the Macedonian radios for few weeks. The video was made by "Tomato Production".
- "192" was realized as a radio single after the realizing of the album. The song gain a large popularity mainly on Macedonian territory. The song hasn't got an official video.
- "Milioner" is a single that marked the album. It was definitively the most successful single from the album, not just in Macedonia, but also in ex-Yugoslavia with the Serbian language version also called "Milioner". The video for the Macedonian version was directed by Darko Andonovski and the Serbian version hasn't got a video. Later in 2008 the song was re-recorded again, but now in English and realized under the title "Million Dollar Player". The luxury video about this version was shot in Netherlands by Corrino Media Group.
- "Nekade Daleku" is the sixth single from the album. It was realized with a video in April/May 2008. Subsequently, it was realized the Serbian language version of the single called "Bye, Bye. The director of the video is Aleksandar Ristovski - Princ.
- "Usni Kako Temno Mastilo is the seventh and the last realized song from the album. It is one of the top ranked songs on the radio's. The director of the video is Aleksandar Ristovski - Princ. Subsequently, it was realized a Serbian language version of the song called "Usne Boje Tamnog Mastila".

== Chart positions ==
Year	Song	Chart positions	
Year	Song	Mak Top 5	MTV Adria Top 20
2006	"Ninanajna"	1	-
2006	"Esen Vo Mene"	1	9
2007	"192"	2	-
2007	"Milioner"	1	-
2007	"Ima Li Kraj"	2	-

== Release history ==
Country	Date	Language
Macedonia	December 26, 2006	Macedonian
