= Macedonian hip-hop =

Music genre or scene

Macedonian hip hop covers the Macedonian hip hop culture and the Macedonian language hip hop music primarily created in Macedonia, but also in the Macedonian diaspora.

== Overview ==
=== Background ===
The Macedonian hip hop started in the 1980s in the then Socialist Republic of Macedonia, but experienced considerable growth after the declaration of independence of the Republic of Macedonia. One of the first critically acclaimed acts was the rock band Super Nova from Skopje, which utilized rap music elements in some of its songs. The group recorded several rap music tracks for the music production branch of the Macedonian Radio-Television, including Hip-hop blues, Rap, Vero and others, some including pop, rock, funk, reggae or other elements. The first members and founders of the bend Super Nova were Viktor Mastoridis (guitar and vocals), Svetislav Gjurik (bass guitar and vocals) and Toni Andonovski (drums). One of those songs was the anti-war themed Rapovanje. Its catchy rhyme, ("Better to rap, than to wage war") made it very popular across the country in 1989. In the same year, they performed at two prominent festivals in (Subotica and Zajecar). The most notable members of the group were: Vikto Mastoridis (guitar, vocals), Miki Kostadinov (drums), Vlatko Georgiev (keyboards) and Vlasto Janevik-Lucky (bass).

One of the notable underground hip hop performers and producers in North Macedonia is Vladimir Agovski-Ago from Skopje. He became involved in the Macedonian hip-hop scene since childhood as a young b-boy in 1986. In the following year, he formed a juvenile rap act called The Masters of Rap and recorded his first studio track in 1988. In 1991, he joined the band Instant Beat, which performed around the country and made recordings in the Macedonian Radio-Television production, which were never officially released. Later, he formed another group, The Most Wanted, which in 1995, released the first Macedonian hardcore rap album, called "Judgment Day". After the group disbanded in 1996, he continued to work under the name Temnata strana (The Dark Side) and he founded the first Macedoninan hip-hop label, called "Dolina na senkite" abbreviated "DNS" (Valley of the Shadows) to promote his own works and other upcoming Macedonian hip hop acts as well.

The group Čista okolina was formed in 1989 by joining several previously existing juvenile rap bands, and later it rose to one of the most prominent hip hop acts in the country. Čista okolina released the album "Noviot aspekt na starata škola" (The New Aspect of the Old School) in the spring of 1996. During its existence, it also released a song together with the prominent alternative rock group Last Expedition. One of the Čista okolina's former members, Vele Solunčev, later became a frontman of the mixed-style music group appropriately named Mosaique because it combined various elements such as hip hop, jazz fusion, alternative rock and ethno-jazz.

=== Notable figures ===
One of the most successful hip hop acts in the country is SAF (Sakam Afro Frizura) formed in 1993. It consists of the emcees Smilen Dimitrov and Mitko Gaštarovski aka Pikisipi, as well as the band's backing DJ and turntablist, Goce Trpkov. In 1996, they released their well-known anti-drug abuse theme called Miss Stone. Its title is a pun between the historical person Miss Stone, the US missionary who met Jane Sandanski in Macedonia in the 1900s, and the phrase stoned. As the group became critically acclaimed, in the following year they started a music TV show called Hiphop teza. They released their debut album titled Safizam in 2001 and played a promotional concert with the prominent US hip hop band Das EFX as a support act.

One of the most productive hip hop artists ever is Da Dzaka Nakot. He published the first solo album in Macedonia, with help from the producers from The Most Wanted* and Taz from Protiv Site. His albums are:

1.Sopstven Pekol* (1999)(Unreleased demo) 2.Neophodno Zlo* (2001) 3.Nema Poveke Tajni (2004) 4.Biomehanika (2006-first and only double cd release in Macedonian hip hop history) 5.Temni Ulici EP (2007) 6.Reanimacija (2007) 7.Priračnik Za Moderna Vojna (2008) 8.L Prezidente (2009) 9.Ekvilibrium (2010) 10.Božjiot Prototip (2012) 11.Sni EP (2015) 12.Neophodno Zlo 2020 (2015) 13.NEOINSTRUMENTALNO 2LO 21 (2021) 14.Berliner Berliner:Die Instrumentals (2021) 15.LIVE ON NO EVIL (2022) 16.OGAN (ep) (2024)

He has numerous collaborations with all of the hip-hop scenes notable figures, including 3 albums with Legijata-a supergroup formed in 1997 by Da Dzaka Nakot, Taz and Strajk, later to be included: LD Pistolero (Green Out), R.O.N.I.N., Blažej (Str2), Bruce and Tonyo San (Green Out), Kemp OD (Keeping It Real) and frequent collaborators and extended family members :Darko Alfa and Divizija-a hip hop crew from Strumica.

Also prominent hiphop names from Macedonia include Klan Istok, Edinstvena opcija, DNS, Puka kozmetika, Green Out, Str2, Slatkaristika, Toni Zen. In 2003, the first all-female Macedonian hip hop band, No Exit, was formed in Štip by Ana Ilievska, Kristina Angelova, and Marija Burovska.

The early 1990s saw the emergence of many Macedonian pop-rap artists influenced by the then-popular MC Hammer and Vanilla Ice. These artists included for example the female solo singer Ena Veko, who released the LP "Bubački i gradski dzverki," and the duo Lastovica, which consisted of Robert Sazdov and Vlado Janevski, who later became a solo pop singer and represented Macedonia in the Eurovision Song Contest in 1998. Behind most of these successful pop-rap acts was the prominent Macedonian composer and producer Toše Pop Simonov. The group Nulta Pozitiv was formed in parallel. Gradually, they became more mainstream and popular across the country, especially after recording the rap track nicknamed after the famous Macedonian folk song "Otvori go Pendžerčeto" ("Open the Window"). It featured an unconventional refrain for a rap song sung by the notable folk music singer Mirko Mitrevski. They released an album titled Transfuzija. Later, another pop-rap artist named Kristijan Gabrovski emerged from Prilep and was nicknamed Risto Bombata after Afrika Bambaataa. He and his backing band became very popular across the country for their mix of rap, pop-rock and pop-folk. In the mid-1990s, an offshoot of Nulta Pozitiv, named Attack, was the harder-sounding group which released the famous song "Atentatot na Kiro" after the assassination-attempt on the then-President of the Republic of Macedonia Kiro Gligorov in 1995. Later, one of the former Nulta Pozitiv members, Darko Dimitrov rose to a prominent Macedonian composer and producer. Dimitrov also worked with the late 1990s/early 2000s pop-rap artists such as Vrčak and Ugro.

One of the first prominent Macedonian rap music festivals was the so-called "Rap'n'Roll" fest which was held in the early 1990s in MKC, the Youth Cultural Centre in Skopje, followed by many others. Currently North Macedonia hosts many hip hop festivals featuring both domestic and foreign performers. A hip hop clubbing scene also exists.

=== Current trends ===
Macedonian hip hop culture has continued to expand. Brothers Aleksandar and Slavcho Koviloski, known by their hip hop political and social activism, and known as a longtime members of hip hop groups like Braka Po Krv and Klan Istok. Since 2005, the brothers are holding lectures in Macedonian highschools, universities and cultural centres. By 2008, they have published three books about hip-hop and urban culture, unique on the Balkans.

Macedonian hip hop performers also exists in the ethnic Macedonian diaspora, in countries such as the United States and Australia. The group Curse ov Dialect from Melbourne features the ethnic Macedonian member nicknamed Vulk Makedonski, and often incorporates elements of traditional Macedonian music.

== See also ==
- Music of North Macedonia
