= Ljubojno =

Ljubojno Љубојно
- Village
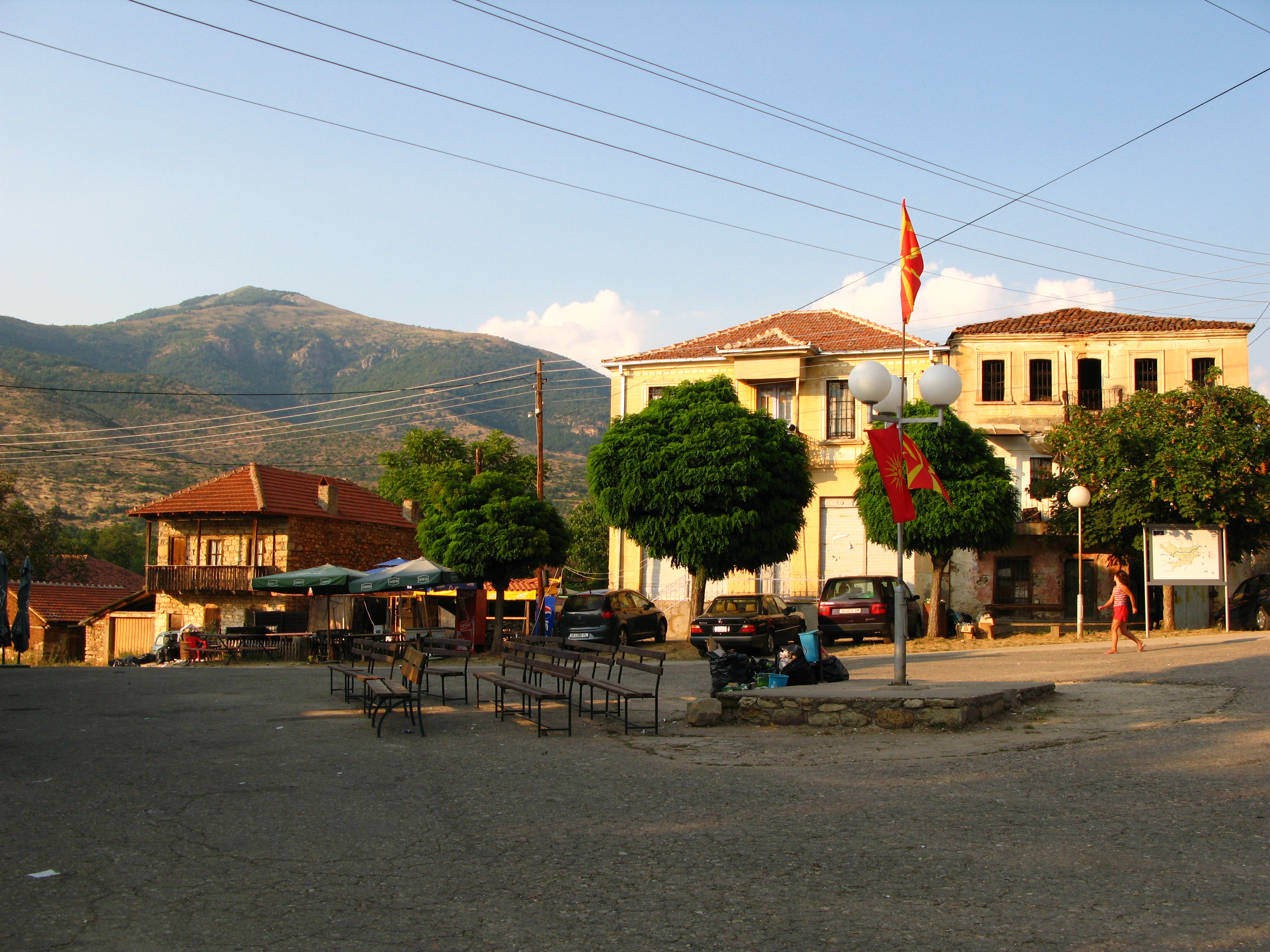
- Centre of the village

- Location within North Macedonia
- Coordinates: 40°53′39″N 21°8′26″E
- Country: North Macedonia
- Region: Pelagonia
- Municipality: Resen

Population (2002)
  - Total: 186
- Time zone: UTC+1 (CET)
  - Summer (DST): UTC+2 (CEST)
- Area code: +389
- Car plates: RE

Ljubojno (Macedonian Cyrillic: Љубојно) is a village located in the region of Prespa in North Macedonia. Ljubojno is situated some 2 km from Prespa lake and about 5 km north of the Greek border, and its elevation is about 920 m above sea level. The population of Ljubojno is 186.

== Demographics ==
Ljubojno is inhabited by Orthodox Macedonians. In the late Ottoman period, some Bektashi Albanians, known locally as Kolonjarë, used to also reside in the village of Ljubojno (Albanian: Lubonjë).

As of the 2021 census, Ljubojno had 141 residents with the following ethnic composition:

- Macedonians 131
- Persons for whom data are taken from administrative sources 7
- Others 3

According to the 2002 census, the village had a total of 186 inhabitants. Ethnic groups in the village include:

- Macedonians 175
- Albanians 10
- Vlachs 1

== Religious objects ==
There are 8 Orthodox churches in the village. Among them are Sv. Prechista, St. Atanasij, St. Marena, St. Elijah, St. Dimitrija, St. Bogorodica and monastery of St. Petre and Paul. Church of St. John was built in 1861, was destroyed by fire in 1903 and was renovated in 1921.

== People from Ljubojno ==
- Lambe Alabakoski (1987 -), singer
- Josif Grezlovski - Gandeto (1945-), writer
- Naum Manivilovski - Prespanski (1934 - 1961), poet
- Vlado Tudžarovski, politician
