= Elena Risteska =

Elena Risteska Елена Ристеска
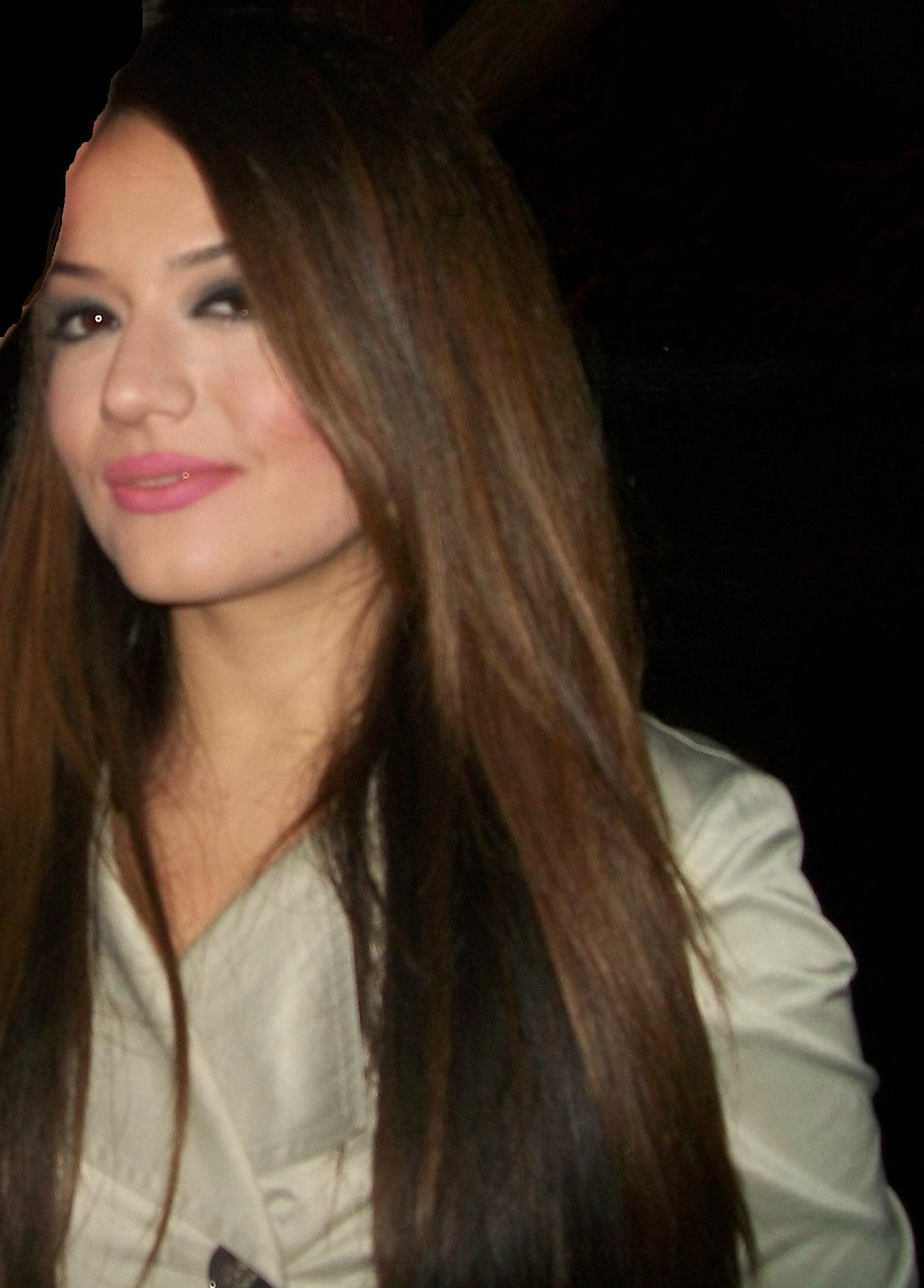
- Risteska in October 2009

Background information
- Also known as: Elena
- Born: 27 April 1986 (age 40); Skopje, SFR Yugoslavia (present-day Republic of Macedonia)
- Genres: Pop; hip hop; R&B
- Occupations: Singer; songwriter
- Instrument: Vocals
- Years active: 2002–present
- Labels: M2 Productions; ER Music And Artist; City
- Website: Official Website

Elena Risteska (Macedonian: Елена Ристеска, [ɛ'lɛna ri'stɛska]; born 27 April 1986), sometimes known as simply Elena, is a Macedonian singer. She represented Macedonia in the Eurovision Song Contest 2006 in Athens with the song "Ninanajna", and finished in 12th place; this was the highest ever finish for the country until Risteska's record was beaten in 2019.

Risteska is also an occasional songwriter, writing for artists such as 4Play, Lambe Alabakoski, and Aleksandra Pileva.

She took part in the second season of the Serbian version of Your Face Sounds Familiar, where she placed second in the final as Beyoncé.

== Biography ==
=== Early life ===
Risteska was born in Skopje on 27 April 1986 in then SR Macedonia to parents Acko and Desa. She showed an interest in the arts at an early age, inheriting her musical interest from her mother but also pursuing other hobbies and interests. In 1994, she joined the KUD "Kočo Racin", which was a club for folk dance and songs. Elena took part in school activities such as singing in the "Young Imitators" show and becoming a member of the drama club.

In 1996, Risteska made her television debut during the Mak-Karaoke Show performing the song "Flamingo" on the commercial channel A1. The same year she started studying the English and French languages. She started to sing in the school choir and went to Bulgaria for her first tour with the folk dance club. In 1998, she took part in many competitions and won many local, national, and international awards in drawing. In 2000, Risteska toured Bulgaria with the folk dance club again.

=== Professional start ===
Risteska rose to fame in Macedonia by competing and Being one of two winners on the music-based reality television show "Play - Search For A Star". Her debut single, "Ona Drugoto" ("The Other Thing") became a hit in Macedonia, resulting in her successful debut album Den i Nok (Ден и Ноќ). The album included various songs which also became successful singles in Macedonia and other Balkan countries. She is also an occasional songwriter, writing for artists such as 4Play, Lambe Alabakoski, Aleksandra Pileva, Maja Sazdanovska, Robert Bilbilov, Verica Pandilovska, Adnan, Emil and Anja Veterova.

Following the success of her debut album, she began promoting herself outside of Macedonia. In 2004, she performed at the Golden Stag Festival in Braşov, Romania and in 2005 she performed "Ni na nebo, ni na zemja" ("Neither heaven nor earth") at the Sunčane Skale music festival in Herceg Novi, Montenegro. Her music video was broadcast on MTV Adria and her popularity continued to grow.

=== Eurovision Song Contest 2006 ===
On 4 March 2006, Elena Risteska won the Macedonia pre-selection contest for the Eurovision Song Contest with the song "Ninanajna". The song was composed and produced by Darko Dimitrov, with lyrics by Rade Vrčakovski. The song is an uptempo, pop song which includes elements of R&B, disco and dance music. She made a video shot for the song together with the Macedonian production "Tomato". In the video, she was presented as shiny care girl that wants love. Risteska qualified for the final, and after spending most of the night on the edge of the top ten (which would guarantee automatic final qualification for Macedonia in 2007), she eventually finished 12th with 56 points, her country's highest finish ever until 2019 when Tamara Todevska came 7th with 305 points.

=== After Eurovision Song Contest - 2007 ===
In July 2006, Elena performed "Ne Mogu" ("I Can't" in Serbo-Croatian) at the Sunčane Skale festival where she placed 10th overall. Elena traveled to Yerevan, Armenia in September to perform as a guest in Armenia's Eurovision 2006 representative Andre's concert. She was well received by the audience, which was expected since her Eurovision song "Ninanajna" was a summer hit and a popular ringtone in Armenia. In October, Elena released a new single called "Esen Vo Mene" ("Autumn In Me"). The song was composed by Darko Dimitrov.

After her hits released over the previous year, Risteska's second album, 192, was released at the end of 2006. It contains "Ninanajna", "Esen Vo Mene", a Macedonian version of "Ne Mogu" and new material.

In 2007, Elena took part in Skopje Fest 2007, the national selection for the Eurovision Song Contest. Although she was not a performer this time, she wrote the lyrics for the song "Belo e se" ("Everything is White"), which was performed by Lambe Alabakoski and came in third place with 101 points. At the Eurovision Song Contest 2007, she delivered the results of the national televoting of Macedonia during the final night.

Risteska participated in the Radijski Festival on 15 December 2007, performing the song "Kreveta dva". It is the Serbian version of her song Ima li kraj. Elena finished in second place together with Karolina Gočeva. Elena won two awards, one for best interpretation and the other from Radio OSM Pale. At the end of 2007 she made her first Serbian language studio album, titled Milioner. It contained mostly the same songs from "192", re-recorded in Serbian, with some exceptions.

=== 2008 - present ===
In 2008, Risteska released her first English single, "Million Dollar Player" (the English version of the popular song "Milioner"), with a music video. The video is a production of "Corrino Media Group" with director Mike Static. Leroy Chambers, author of the lyrics, takes part in the video as her "Millionaire".

After that, she returned to older projects. She shout a video for the song "Nekade Daleku " from the album 192. Besides the Macedonian version, she shouted a video for the Serbian version of the same song called "Bye, Bye " included in the album Milioner. Director of the video was Aleksandar Ristovski - Princ. In the middle time she made a new duet with "Parketi" called "Sakam Da Te Galam".

On 19 December 2008, Risteska held her first solo concert in Skopje. It was staged at the Metropolis Arena and featured guests such as Lambe Alabakovski, Tuna, Parketi, and Regina.

In 2009, she released a video for her song "Usni Kako Temno Mastilo". The same as her previous videos director was again Aleksandar Ristovski - Princ. On 3 November 2009 Elena released her single "Dosta" which is the first single from Elena's fourth studio album. On 14 March 2010 Elena released her second single of her fourth studio album named "Sakam Po Dobro Da Te Pamtam". Later that year, Elena released her single "Srekna Nov Godina" (Happy New Year). 2010 was the year of the fourth M2 Search For A Star which was the show that Elena was discovered in, but this time Elena had the role of a judge along with Ivo Jankoski, Darko Dimitrov & Vesna Petrusevska.The following year Elena was chosen as "Best Song in the Balkans from North Macedonia for 2010" with her hit single "Sakam Po Dobro Da Te Pamtam"(I want to remember you for good).On 24 June 2011 Elena & Lambe Alabakovski released their second duet titled "Najdobro Do Sega" (The Best Til Now), a music video was later recorded for the song which had already become a summer hit single. Later that year in August, Risteska held a special concert in Ohrid, North Macedonia, she performed many traditional Macedonian songs and some of her past hits but with a traditional arrangement. In September 2012, she announced that her new single would be called "Opasni Vreminja". It was released in October with new video. She shot her new video in many different places such as Ohrid and other cities in Macedonia.

In late 2014, she was a contestant of the second season of the Serbian version of Your Face Sounds Familiar. She imitated artists such as Nina Badric, Severina, Jennifer Lopez, and Esma Redzepova. She won only in the fifth week, as Jennifer Lopez singing "Booty", but she was chosen by the public to participate in the finals. She placed as the runner-up in the finals as Beyoncé, singing "End of Time".

In 2022, she performed her song "Dozivotno" together with Macedonian singer Karolina Gočeva at the latter's New Year's Eve performance on Macedonian Radio Television (MRT). The live performance video was released on the singer's official YouTube channel on 26 July 2023.

== Artistry ==
=== Influences ===
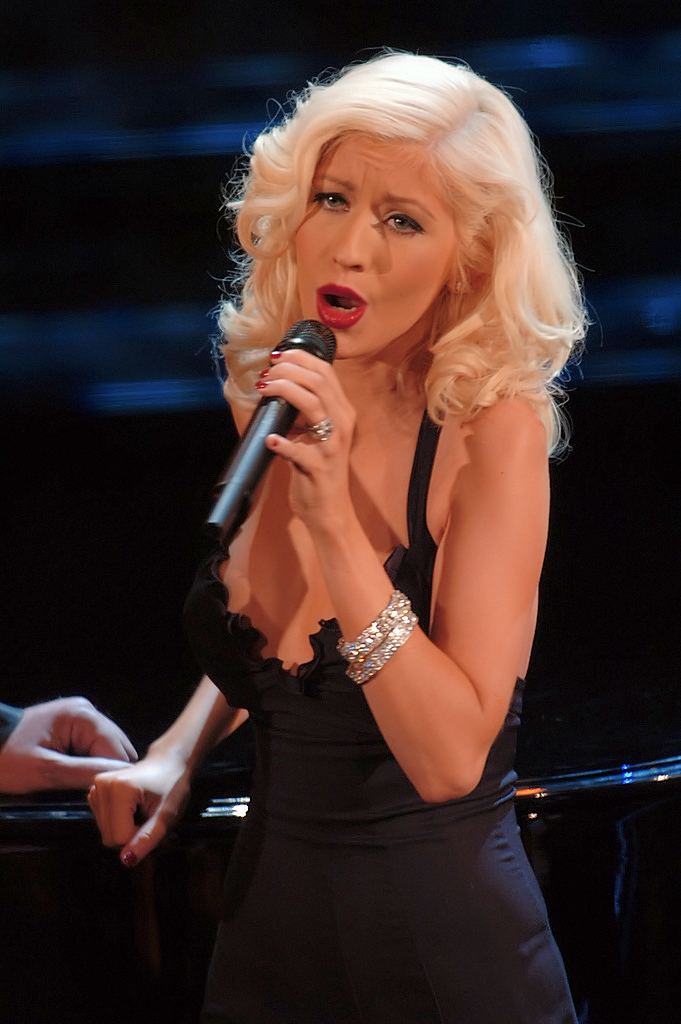
Risteska cites Beyonce and Christina Aguilera as her main influences.

Risteska is best known for her distinct mezzo-soprano vocal range and stage presence. Throughout her career, Risteska has drawn frequent comparisons to Beyonce and Christina Aguilera. In terms of vocals, choreography and stage presence, she has been citing both as influences in her work. She has also covered Beyonce's song Halo in 2010. She stated in an interview that in her earliest youth, Celine Dion and Whitney Houston were her main influences, but as she grew she found more inspiration in Beyonce Knowles and Christina Aguilera. In 2010, Risteska also covered "Hit the Road Jack" with Lambe Alabakovski.

== Discography ==
=== Albums ===
- Den i Nok (2003)
- 192 (2006)
- Milioner (2008)
- The Very Best of ... Elena Risteska (2009)
- Bez Šminka (2016)

=== Compilations ===
- Play: Search for a new Star (Compilation)
- Makedonija Zasekogaš
- Oriental Garden - VOL 7
- Najdobro od Makedonija (The Best of Macedonia)
- Best Of Elena Risteska & Lambe Alabakovski

=== Solo Singles ===
- 2002: "Ona Drugoto"
- 2003: "Den I Nok"
- 2003: "Raj I Pekol"
- 2003: "Vo Tvojot Svet" (with Adnan)
- 2003: "Ne Sakam Da Krijam"
- 2004: "Pobeda Za Nas" (with Emil Arsov)
- 2004: "Ni Na Nebo, Ni Na Zemja"
- 2006: "Ninanajna"
- 2006: "Ne Mogu"
- 2006: "Ljubav Nije Za Nas" (with Grupa Regina)
- 2006: "Esen Vo Mene"
- 2007: "192"
- 2007: "Milioner" (featuring Leroy Chambers)
- 2007: "Kreveta Dva"
- 2008: "Million Dollar Player
- 2008: "Nekade Daleku/Bye, Bye"
- 2008: "More Sokol Pie"
- 2008: "Sakam Da Te Galam" (with Parketi)
- 2009: "Usni Kako Temno Mastilo/Usne Boje Tamnog Mastila"
- 2009: "Dosta"
- 2010: "A moževme"
- 2010: "Sakam Po Dobro Da Te Pamtam"
- 2010: "Srekna Nova Godina"
- 2011: "Najdobro Do Sega" (with Lambe Alabakovski)
- 2012: "Opasno Vreme"
- 2012: "Ne laži me"
- 2013: "Što si ti"
- 2015: "Doživotno"
- 2015: "Na ista adresa"

=== Featured Singles ===
- 2006: "Zaspana Ubavica" feat. Vrčak
- 2006: "Na Nekoi Drugi Svetovi" (with Lambe Alabakoski feat. Vrčak)
- 2008: "Sakam Zeleno" (feat. other singers)
- 2008: "Come and Get Me" (with SnowBlack)
- 2009: "Icelenie" (feat. other singers)
- 2011: "Makedonija"(Memorija) (feat. other singers)

== Awards ==
=== Golden Lady Bug ===
- Discovery of the Year

2006:

- Female Singer of the Year

=== Night of Stars ===
2004:

- Most Attractive Singer of the Year

=== Sunčane Skale ===
2006:

- Princeton Award for Debut of the Year

2007:

- Duet of the Year: "Love Is Not For Us"

=== High School Union ===
- Discovery of the Year

2006:

- Most Successful Female Singer of the Year

=== Other awards ===
- SMS Hit of the Year (as voted by the listeners of Antenna 5 radio)
- Female Singer of the Year (as voted by the listeners of MS television)

2006:

- Duet of the Year: "Ljubav Nije Za Nas" (Love is not for us)" (Oscar of Popularity)

=== Radijski Festival ===
2007:

- The best interpretation
- The award from Radio OSM Pale

=== Balkan Music Award ===
- Best Song in the Balkans from Macedonia - 2010

Preceded by Martin Vučić with "Make My Day"	Macedonia in the Eurovision Song Contest; 2006	Succeeded by Karolina Gočeva with "Mojot svet"
