= Aleksandar Sarievski =

Background information
- Born: June 20, 1922; Galičnik, Kingdom of Yugoslavia
- Died: December 19, 2002 (aged 80) Skopje, Republic of Macedonia
- Genres: Folk
- Occupation: Singer-songwriter
- Instruments: Vocals, accordion
- Years active: 1946–2002
- Formerly of: Tanec

Aleksandar Sarievski (Macedonian: Александар Сариевски [alɛkˈsandar saˈri.ɛfski]; June 20, 1922 – December 19, 2002) was a Macedonian singer-songwriter whose career spanned almost six decades. He was one of the most recognizable figures in Macedonian music.

Sarievski was a co-founder of the folklore musical ensemble Tanec and frequently traveled with the group as an ambassador of Macedonian music and culture. His renditions of local folk songs are particularly well known and, in many cases, the first known recorded versions. These include "Jovano, Jovanke", "More Sokol Pie", and "Uči me majko, karaj me", among others. He also composed the popular folk-style song "Zajdi Zajdi". Aleksandar Sarievski died in 2002 aged 80. The then-President of the Republic of Macedonia Boris Trajkovski and Prime Minister Branko Crvenkovski as well as the Ministry of Culture sent the Sarievski family messages of condolence following the news of his death.
