= Milioner (song) =

2007 song by Elena Risteska

"Milioner" (in Macedonian Cyrillic: Милионер, English translation: Millionaire) is a single by the popular Macedonian singer Elena Risteska. It was realized in three versions: Macedonian, Serbian and English.

== Release history ==
Country	Date	Version
Macedonia	13 May 2007	Macedonian
Bosnia and Herzegovina	2008	Serbian
Montenegro	2008	Serbian
Serbia	2008	Serbian
Europe	2008	English

== Macedonian version ==
=== Background ===
"Milioner Милионер"

Single by Elena Risteska

from the album 192
- Released: 13 May 2007
- Recorded: 2006
- Genre: Pop, R&B, hip hop
- Length: 3:53
- Label: M2
- Songwriters: Darko Dimitrov, Elena Risteska
- Producer: Darko Dimitrov

Elena Risteska singles chronology
"192" (2007)	"Milioner; Милионер" (2007)	"Kreveta Dva" (2007)

After representing Macedonia in the Eurovision Song Contest 2006 in Athens Elena started to work on a new album and new songs. Her experience at the Montenegrin festival Suncane Skale was overriding. On the first night she grabbed the award for best debut singer in 2006 and on the second night of the festival she participated with the song "Ne Mogu". In the winter of 2006 she released her second studio album 192 on which is "Milioner".

=== Production history of "Milioner" ===
Milioner is a pop song with R&B and hip hop elements. The author of the music is Elena's producer Darko Dimitrov and the lyrics were written by her. The hip hop text was sung by Leroy Chambers. It was realized with a video clip on 13 May 2007.

=== Explanation of the lyrics ===
The title of the song Millionaire is the main theme of the whole song. The author of the lyrics is Elena herself. She is starting the song and saying that she feels that he is watching her and knows what he is thinking. She exactly knows in which places she is looking. She says that she is not a materialistic girl and millionaires could not be with her, she just wants one thousand kisses. She says to him that he is on top of the world and he has everything that he wants, but he needs just a good girl, that is what he is missing. For her diamonds, pearls and money are nothing, she just wants one thousand kisses. The chorus is coming where the phrase You are a millionaire! (in Macedonian: Ти си милионер!) is repeating on every second word. In the chorus Elena is saying that she doesn't want any money and love is that that she actually misses. She says that he could not buy her, because with money love is not buying. The song is continuing and Elena asks him why he is still on top and tells him to come down to her world, he is just missing love. She sings about her eyes comparing with black diamonds, and says that with brilliants her lips are full. She just wants one thousand kisses. The chorus is continuing. Leroy Chambers sings in English the following sentences: "Every time you call me, you only try to change me, and every time you come around we get busy, it's not my regios, but so you like me, no no no is not about my money, and girl you're funny, and if you want me, because you know i am living like a millionaire, because i got what i want, and i take what i need, and I gotta take off with my money" and "Shake it like a million dollar player".

=== Music video ===
Elena with the girls in the video for Milioner

On 12 April 2007, Elena started with the shooting of “Milioner”. The video was shot at two locations in Skopje. The director of the video is Darko Antonovski. On the shooting beside the huge working team, attended Risteska's friends, Maja Sazdanovska (one of the people in the team, obligated for the realization besides Darko and Laki), Fani and Dadar (the most famous make up artist in Macedonia), etc. In the video there are many interesting scenes with a few attractive girls, a huge and beautiful limousine and some other interesting stuff. The shooting lasted 17 hours.

=== Ratings ===
The song was rated very well on the Macedonian market and Macedonian music scene. For few months, it was on the top of the charts on radio stations such as Bubamara and Radio Ros.

== Serbian version ==
"Milioner Милионер"

Single by Elena Risteska

from the album Milioner
- Released: 2008
- Recorded: 2007/2008
- Genre: Pop, R&B, hip hop
- Length: 3:53
- Label: City Records
- Songwriters: Darko Dimitrov, Aida Baraku
- Producer: Darko Dimitrov

Elena Risteska singles chronology
"Kreveta Dva" (2007)	"Milioner; Милионер" (2008)	"Bye, Bye" (2008)

== Background ==
After the success of the album 192 (recorded whole in Macedonian) Risteska signed a contract with the famous Serbian label City Records. Together with her music producer Darko Dimitrov decided to make a Serbian version of the album 192. At that period while she was recording the album in the City Records studios she and her team resided in Belgrade. The arrangement of all the songs was the same, it was just made translation of the texts - from Macedonian to Serbian. There are some lyricist present in the album such as Snezhana Vukomanovic and Albanian Songwriter Aida Baraku (that wrote bigger part of the lyrics). The Serbian version of 192 was named Milioner after the namesake song.

== Production history of Serbian "Milioner" ==
The author of the music Darko Dimitrov did not change the arrangement at all. The lyricist of the Serbian version of "Milioner" is Albanian Songwriter Aida Baraku. The lyrics are with the same meaning (with some exceptions) just with translation in Serbian. In this version is present Leroy Chambers too singing the same parts as in the Macedonian version of the song. For this version was not shouted a video, although it became popular in Serbia, Bosnia & Herzegovina and Montenegro.

== Presentation ==
Elena sang the song together with one of the students in Operacija Trijumf, the Ex-Yugoslav version of Star Academy. The song was presented in various TV shows on Pink TV such as: "Bravo Show", "Petak u 2" etc.

== English version ==
"Million Dollar Player"

Single by Elena Risteska
- Released: 2008
- Recorded: 2008
- Genre: Pop, R&B, hip hop
- Length: 3:53
- Label: Foreign Media Music
- Songwriters: Darko Dimitrov, Leroy Chambers

Elena Risteska singles chronology
"Milioner" (2008)	"Million Dollar Player" (2008)	"Nekade Daleku" (2008)

== Background ==
After Elena's presenting Macedonia in the Eurovision Song Contest 2006 in Greece she became instantly popular within the European audience. From there became the contract with the music company from Netherlands called "Foreign Media Music". It is signed a contract so Elena can rerecord her songs from the album 192 in English and air the album within the European countries. The first project from the anticipatory album is the English version of "Milioner" called "Million Dollar Player".

== Production history ==
As previously in the Serbian & Macedonian version, the arrangement is the same. The lyrics for this version are written by Leroy Chambers that is accompanying Elena in the previous versions of "Million Dollar Player". The concept of the lyrics is same as in the Macedonian and the Serbian versions (with some changes appropriate for the English language.

== Music video ==
This project was presented together with the video of the song. The video for the song Million Dollar Player is work of "Corrino Media Group" a video production from Netherlands. The director of the video is Mike Static. The video was shot from 10th to 13 October 2007. It was shot in Netherlands on a street where Risteska is driving a sport car and in a luxury apartment where her "millionaire" is Leroy Chambers". The video is notable because of Elena beauty in it. She wears clothes from top designers. In one of the scenes she wears an open blouse with crystals making her incredibly sexy.
