= Den i Nok =

Den i Nok Ден и Ноќ Day and Night

Studio album by Elena Risteska
- Released: October 17, 2003
- Recorded: 2002–2003
- Genre: Pop
- Length: 33:20
- Label: M2 Production
- Producer: Darko Dimitrov

Elena Risteska chronology
Den i Nok; Ден и Ноќ; Day and Night (2003)	192 (2006)

Den i Nok (Macedonian: Ден и Ноќ; Day and Night) is the debut album of the Macedonian pop musician Elena Risteska. Following the release of the album in 2003, Risteska garnered popularity in several Balkan countries. The album, although only long enough to be an EP, achieved a large amount of success in her native country of Macedonia, with several songs from the album going on to become hit singles in their own right.

== Track listing ==
1. "Telo i Duša" (Тело и Душа, Body And Soul)
2. "Raj i Pekol" (Рај и Пекол, Heaven And Hell)
3. "Den i Nok" (Ден и Ноќ, Day And Night)
4. "Vo Tvojot Svet" (Во Твојот Свет, In Your World)
5. "Tvoja Edinstvena" (Твоја Единствена, Your Only One)
6. "Ne Sakam Da Krijam" (Не Сакам да Кријам, I Don't Want To Hide)
7. "Me Nemaš Mene" (Ме Немаш Мене, You Don't Have Me)
8. "Prosti Mi Za Sè" (Прости ми за Сѐ, Forgive Me For Everything)
9. "Ona Drugoto" (Она Другото, The Other Thing)
