= Macedonia Timeless =

Macedonia Timeless Македонија Вечна
- Logo of the project
- Language: English, Macedonian (some of the videos are in Turkish, Russian, Italian, Dutch, German, French, Spanish and Albanian too)
- Directed by: Milčo Mančevski, Igor Ivanov Izi, Dušan Drakalski, Gjorče Stavrevski
- Music by: Kiril Džajkovski, Foltin, Zlatko Origjanski
- Production company: Senka Film, Pristop MK, New Moment (together with the government of the Republic of North Macedonia)
- Country: North Macedonia
- Official website: http://www.macedonia-timeless.com/

Macedonia Timeless (Macedonian: Македонија Вечна, transliterated Makedonija Večna) is a series of promotional tourist videos about the Republic of North Macedonia. The videos showcase scenery from the Balkan country and its culture to a foreign audience. Each video of the project is the work of a private production company, carried out on behalf of the government of North Macedonia, which officially funds the effort. The purpose of the project as it is defined is "to promote awareness of Macedonian tourism opportunities".

== Production history ==
The first video in the series was directed by Macedonian film-maker Milčo Mančevski, best known for directing the Academy award nominated film Before the Rain. Filming started in October 2008 and the production company Senka film was allocated a budget of €190,000 by the government to complete the one-minute video. Kiril Džajkovski arranged a version of the traditional Macedonian song "Uči me majko, karaj me" for the soundtrack.

The video begins with a father reading a book to his daughter. After opening the book, a montage of various Macedonian localities is shown, including Prespa, Veles, Ohrid, the monastery of St. Jovan Bigorski, Kokino, Stobi, Kurbinovo, Konopište and the capital of North Macedonia, Skopje. Archaeological discoveries found on the territory of the country were also shown, along with depictions of Alexander the Great and Prince Marko. It was released in nine languages: Macedonian, English, Turkish, Russian, Italian, Dutch, German, French, Spanish and Albanian. The video premiered on 24 December 2008, and was aired on CNN and CNN International the day after.

== Reception ==
One of the "mistakes" in the video: The "forgotten" reflectors near the house in Veles

The young boy representing Alexander The Great and the technical mistakes in the background

Reactions to the video by local media were largely favorable, although some criticism was reported that involved questions on the originality of the concept, likening it to a 2006 Georgian promotional video. Others complained that the video presented North Macedonia solely as a Christian country. Complaints were reported from Bitola, Prilep and cities in southeastern North Macedonia for not presenting them in the video.

Technical aspects also drew attention. In the 13th second, reflectors can be clearly seen near the house in Veles, and viewers criticised the production for not noticing what they considered to be a mistake. However, director Mančevski explained that they were deliberately left in the shot for artistic purposes. Viewers also pointed out that in the 24th second, the scene that is assumed to be depicting a young Alexander The Great contains technical mistakes in the background.

Despite internal criticism, the video received a favourable review from Bradt travel guides, and won First Prize at the International Festival for Tourist films in Warsaw, Poland.

=== Controversy with Greece ===
Early from the release of the first video criticism arose from Greece regarding the historical accuracy of the videos, that it regarded as alluding through imagery and symbolism a connection of the modern country to the ancient kingdom of Macedonia. Bad reception in Greece also stems from the long running dispute regarding the use name "Macedonia" which is also the name of a neighboring Greek province. Greek sources also claimed that the official campaign wrongfully used artifacts belonging to ancient Greek history. Senka film denied the claims, affirming that all the archaeological discoveries used, were found on Macedonian territory.

== Sequential videos ==
=== Second Macedonia Timeless video ===
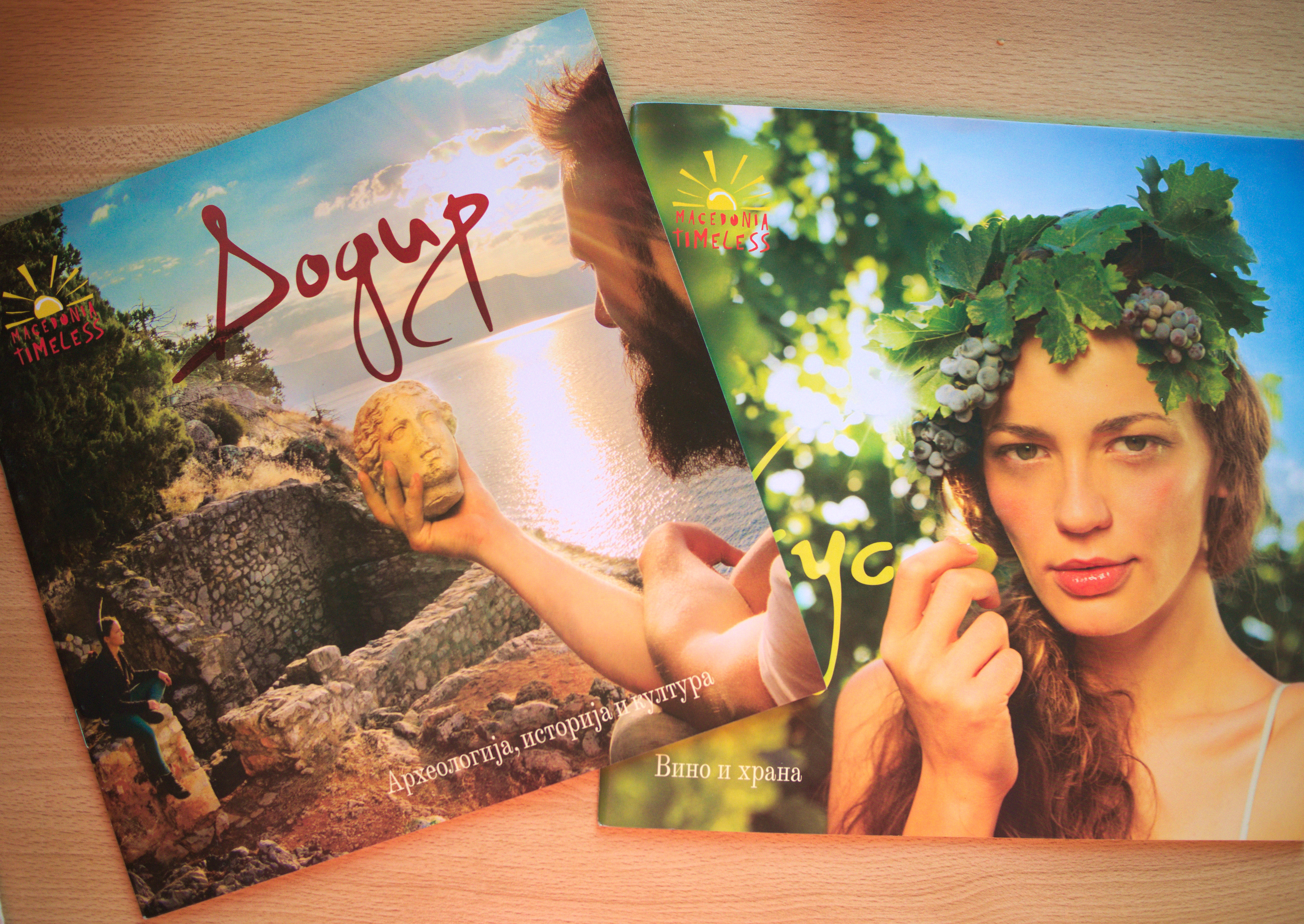
Macedonia Timeless brochures, Tourism Fair in Serbia 2017

The second video titled Macedonia Timeless sequence was made by "Pristop- MK" production. The director of the video is Igor Ivanov – Izi and the art director is Igor Toshevski. Director of the photo is Dzaljs Natdzens and the director of photography is Nina Velnikj. The costumes are by Žaklina Krstevska and Blanka Budak. On the video worked 80 professionals from North Macedonia, Slovenia, Serbia, Croatia, Belgium, and England. The video was filmed during April and May 2009 with 35 mm quality camera. The worth of the video is €200,000. Its length is 75 seconds, but also shorter versions of the same video were produced. The composer of the music is Origjanski Zlatko. In the video are entwined the Ancient, Medieval and the Modern period of North Macedonia. The video was filmed in several locations: Matka, Ohrid, Skopje, Galičnik, Saint Jovan Bigorski Monastery, Stobi, Vitačaevo etc. The video is made in two versions: English and Macedonian. The English version was narrated by the famous Macedonian pop singer Vlado Janevski. The touristic video had it promotion on 12 June 2009 in the cafe Trend in Skopje. On 15 June the video for the first time aired on CNN and CNN International.

=== Third Macedonia Timeless video ===
The third video in the series was shot, but it was not yet presented to the audience. The director of the video is Gjorče Stavrevski.

=== Macedonia Timeless Temples ===
Macedonia Timeless Temples (Macedonian: Македонија Вечна Храмови) is the fourth video in the Macedonia Timeless series. The theme of the video is the temples (churches, monasteries and mosques) all over North Macedonia. The director of this video is Milčo Mančevski, the director of Macedonia Timeless 1. The music is a remix by the Macedonian folk song "Uči me majko, karaj me" made by Kiril Džajkovski (the nearly same music was used in Macedonia Timeless 1). The producer of the video is Elena Staniševa. The video was filmed over two months in different locations: Zrze, Varoš, Matka, Veljusa, Veles, Mustapha Pasha Mosque and GTC Trgovski Centar in Skopje. The video was edited with different effects.

=== Macedonia Timeless: Ohrid – The City of Light ===
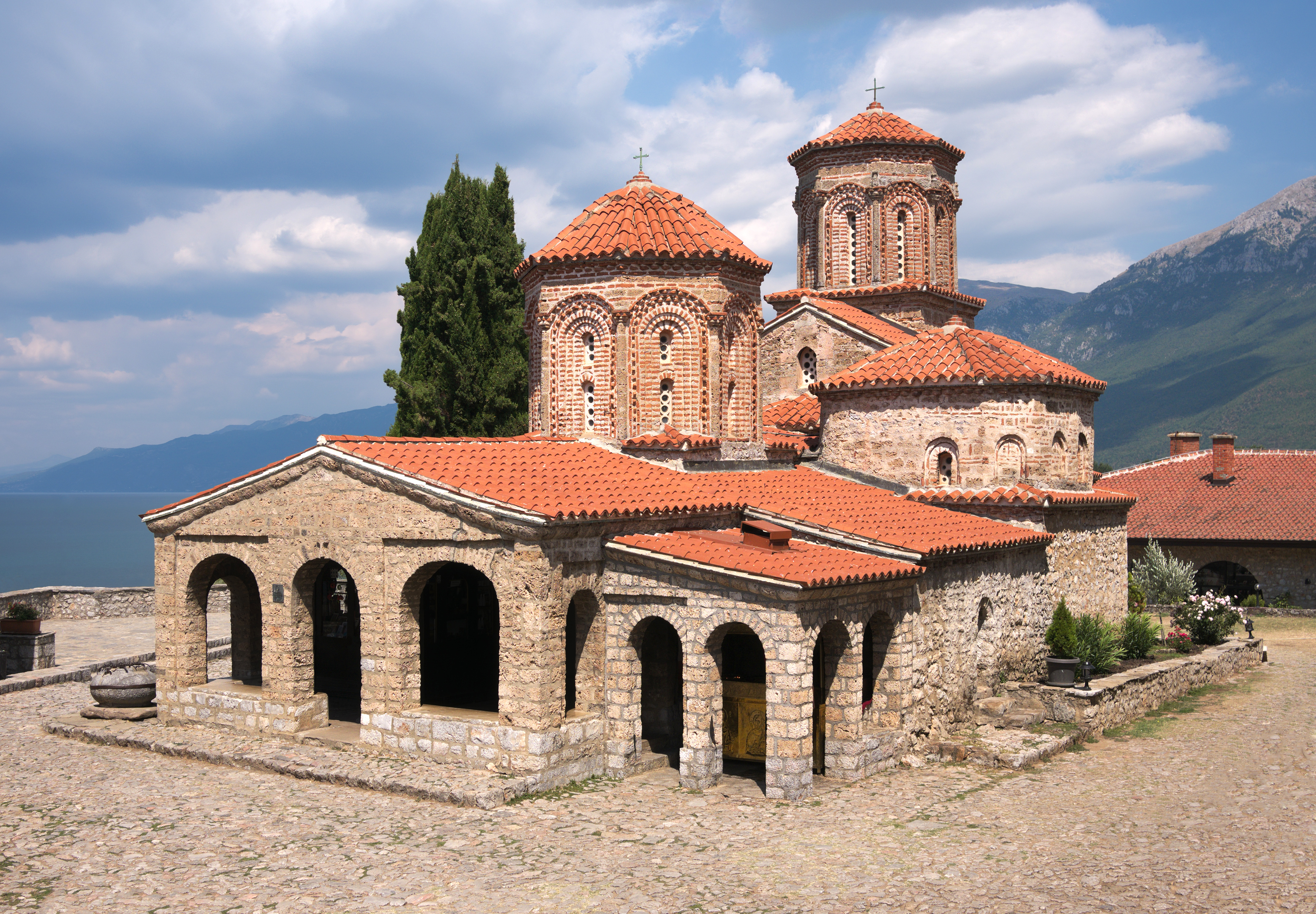
Monastery of Saint Naum in Ohrid

The fifth video is dedicated to the city of Ohrid. The video was promoted by the marketing agency "New Moment". On 2 July for first time it aired on CNN and CNN International.

The video is called Ohrid – the city of light. Inspiration for the title gave the old name of Ohrid, "Lichnidos" (in Ancient Greek meaning the city of light). In the sixty seconds are shown the landmarks of the "Balkan Jerusalem" famous for its art, religion, churches and monasteries. All that is narrated throw a visual game of the lightening and the shadows.

The video is an idea of the "New Moment" agency. The script writer and the director of the video is Dušan Drakalski, director of photography is Slobodan Trnik – Trn, photographer is Georgi Klinčarov and the producers of the video are Filip Dimitrov and Goran Sazdanovski. The video was filmed in five days and in it are shown some locations in Ohrid: Plaošnik, village Trpejca, Monastery of Saint Naum, Saint Perivlepta, the old city and the Robevi family house. In the making of the video was included a team of 70 people and a budget of €80,000.

In the video are present some well known Macedonians: Karolina Gočeva, Meto Jovanovski and Nikolina Kujača. The video will be shown in two versions – one with the music made by the composer Duke Bojadziev and the other with the music of the band "Foltin".

=== Macedonian Wine -Timeless ===
The sixth video is dedicated to the Macedonian wine. The video was promoted by the marketing agency "T-Reks" in Skopje on November 20, 2009. The video is worth around 120,000 euros. It will be broadcast on television channels worldwide. Video director is Ivo Trajkov, the scenario is written by Zlatko Kalenikov, and as chief protagonist appears actor Nikola Ristanovski. Director of photography is Suki Mendečević and the music is written by Kiril Džajkovski. In the video there are vineyards typical for North Macedonia, like Tikveš, Negotinsko, Skopje, Galičica, the vineyards of Bovin and Skovin, as well as recognizable locations Plaošnik and Ohrid Old Town. According to the director Trajkov, the video is designed as a story, used parts of the adventures of Indiana Jones, James Bond, and Goce Delčev to be recognizable in the world.

== Awards ==
- the first video in the series won a first prize at the International Festival for Tourist films in Warsaw, Poland.
- The second video won an award in the festival for tourist commercials APT&TUR in Portugal.

== See also ==
- Tourism in North Macedonia
- History of the Republic of North Macedonia
