= Usni Kako Temno Mastilo =

"Usni Kako Temno Mastilo" "Usne Boje Tamnog Mastila"

Single by Elena Risteska

from the album 192 & Milioner
- Released: 20 January 2009
- Recorded: 2006, re-recorded 2008
- Genre: Pop, R&B, pop-rock
- Length: 4:02
- Label: M2 Production, City Records
- Songwriters: Darko Dimitrov, Ognen Nedelkovski, Elena Risteska, Snežana Vukomanović
- Producer: Darko Dimitrov

Elena Risteska singles chronology
"Sakam Da Te Galam" (2008)	"Usni Kako Temno Mastilo" "Usne Boje Tamnog Mastila" (2009)	"Dosta" (2009)

"Usni Kako Temno Mastilo" (Macedonian: Усни како темно мастило, English translation: Lips like dark ink) is a single by the Macedonian singer Elena Risteska. For first time was recorded in 2006 in Macedonian, but later in 2008 Serbian version of the song was recorded too. In the Serbo-Croatian speaking countries the single was realized under the title "Usne Boje Tamnog Mastila". The Macedonian version is included in the album 192 and the Serbian in Milioner.

== Background ==
After Eurovision Song Contest 2006 Elena started to work on a new project. The album 192 was realized in late 2006 and on that album was included "Usni Kako Temno Mastilo". But in 2008 the song was re-recorded in Serbian too and placed in her first Serbian language album Milioner. In the early 2009 it was realized with video of the both versions.

== Production history ==
"Usni Kako Temno Mastilo" is a pop song with R&B and pop-rock elements. The author of the music is Elena's producer Darko Dimitrov. The Macedonian lyrics are written by Ognen Nedelkovski and the Serbian by Snežana Vukomanović together with Elena's help. Both of the versions were released with a video on 20 January 2009.

== Music video ==
The music video for the song was shot in the end of 2008, but realized later in 2009. Director of the video is Aleksandar Ristovski - Princ with whom Elena cooperated about her previous videos about the songs "Nekade Daleku" ("Bye Bye") and "Sakam Da Te Galam". The video was filmed in various locations in the capital of Macedonia, Skopje. The video features dark effects in green and blue. It was realized on 20 January 2009.

== Release history ==
Country	Date	Version
Macedonia	20 January 2009	Macedonian
Bosnia and Herzegovina	20 January 2009	Serbian
Croatia	20 January 2009	Serbian
Montenegro	20 January 2009	Serbian
Serbia	20 January 2009	Serbian
