= Adelina Tahiri =

Macedonian-Albanian singer (born 1992)

- Born: 4 April 1992 (age 34); Skopje, Macedonia
- Genres: Pop, R&B
- Occupation: Singer
- Years active: 2000s–present

Adelina Tahiri (born 4 April 1992) is a Macedonian singer. Some of her most well-known songs include "Nuk Jam Penduar", "Vuaj", "Mjaftë", "Më Trego", and "Manipulator". Tahiri has an extensive audience of listeners and fans in Kosovo, Albania, North Macedonia and Italy.

== Life and career ==
Adelina Tahiri was born on 4 April 1992 into an Albanian family in the city of Skopje, Macedonia.

Tahiri began her musical career in Albania, where she released her first single "Më Trego" in 2007, when she was 16 years old, and her first studio album Eliksir a year later. She participated in various music festivals on Albanian television, including Ylberi (2004, 2005), Çelësi Muzikor 2 (2008), Top Fest 5 (2008), Kënga Magjike (2011), and as support for Shpat Kasapi at Festivali i Këngës (2008, second semi-final). In Kosovo, she participated in the television shows Videofesti (2009, 2010) by Kohavision, Zhurma Show (2010, 2011, 2012, 2013, 2015) by Zico TV, and SVFM (2013). She won an award at TVSH's Netët e Klipit Shqiptar 9 (2010) for the music video "Manipulator".

In 2022, Tahiri won Dance With Me Albania, the Albanian version of Let's Dance on TV Klan.

== Personal life ==
Tahiri is married to Serjoza Markov, a Macedonian lawyer, with whom she has a son.

== Discography ==
=== Studio albums ===
- 2007 : Narçizoid
- 2010 : Nuk Jam Penduar
- 2015 : Ani Ani

=== Singles ===
- 2008 : Më Trego
- 2009 : Vuaj
- 2013 : Ti Mos U Kthe
- 2011 : Manipulátor
- 2012 : Mjaftë
