= Uči me majko, karaj me =

Traditional folk song from the region of Macedonia

Uči me majko, karaj me (Bulgarian: Учи ме майко, карай ме, Macedonian and Serbian: Учи ме мајко, карај ме, lit. 'Teach me mother, scold me') is a traditional folk song from the region of Macedonia.

It was published for the first time by the Bulgarian National Revival activists Miladinov brothers in their collection Bulgarian Folk Songs in 1861. This song is remembered in its folk rendition mostly by the ethnic Macedonian folk singer Aleksandar Sarievski, while the band Leb i Sol have arranged a modern rock version. The song was also performed by Macedonian singer Toše Proeski and Bulgarian singer Kiril Kostov.
