= Alice in WonderBand =

Serbian musical and theatrical duo (1998– )

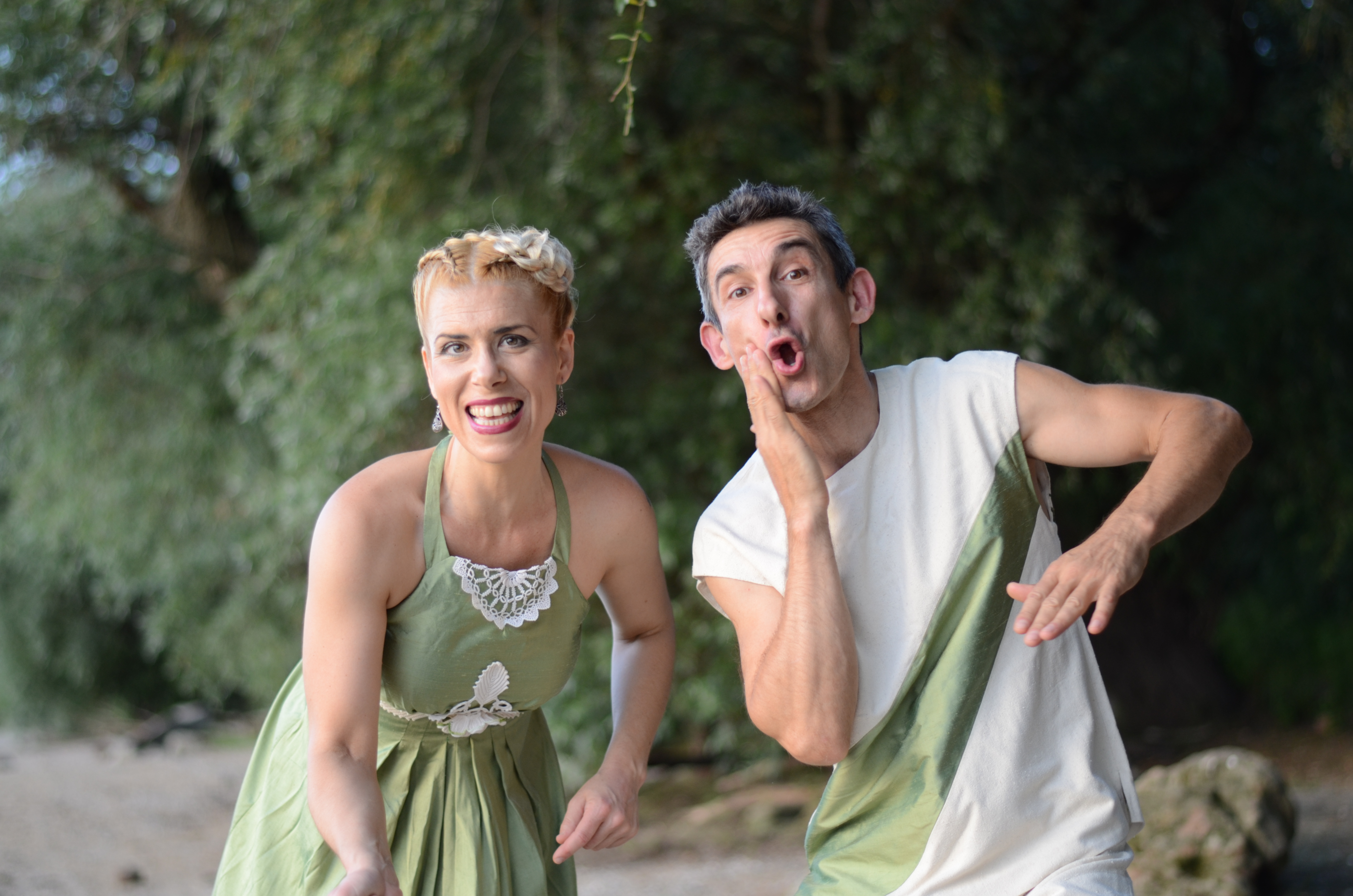
- Ana Vrbaški & Marko Dinjaški

Background information
- Origin: Fruška Gora, Sremski Karlovci
- Genres: Body music
- Years active: 1998–present
- Labels: CPL-Music
- Members: Ana Vrbaški; Marko Dinjaški
- Website: aliceinwonderband.com?lang=en

Alice in WonderBand is a Serbian duo of musical and theatrical performers who use body percussion and body music as their basic technique. The group was formed in 1998 on Fruška Gora, and since then has performed and held workshops in Serbia, region and the EU. They are the only ones in the Balkan region who deal with a very specific type of performing arts – a combination of music, theater, dance and acrobatics through the special skill of body percussion.

== Members ==
Alice in WonderBand is a project of two artists, Ana Vrbaški and Marko Dinjaški. They are known to the regional audience as participants in the "I've Got Talent!" competition in the 2016/2017 season on Pink Television. They live on the edge of the Fruška Gora National Park, near Sremski Karlovci, Serbia, and create art in harmony with nature. These two performers are partners on stage, as well as in life.

Marko and Ana are body music educators, and in addition to music workshops for children, young people and adults, they also lead an accredited webinar "Rhymes and body music as a means of working in the development of speech in preschool children″.

== Career ==
Alice in WonderBand is a musical and theater duo that specializes in body music for children and adults. Their debut album "RikaTaka, Novi Balkanski Ritam" released on November 4, 2022, for the German label "CPL-Music", is a union of different genres, acoustic and electronic music, tradition and contemporary artist expression. The acoustic sounds of the body as an instrument merge with the musical tradition of the Balkans, while folk songs from Serbia, Croatia, Bosnia and Herzegovina, North Macedonia, Bulgaria, Moldova, Greece, Turkey, Kosovo, and even Hungary arise curiosity about the rich musical tradition of the region.

=== "Kiss" Musical Comedy ===
"Kiss" is a musical comedy. It is a story of playing, flirting, teasing, competing and, above all, love between men and women. The comic scenes are interwoven with interesting and new arrangements of famous songs by "Smak", Prince, "The Beatles", traditional Balkan songs, as well as original songs by the performers performed with the simplest means - only their bodies and voices.

It premiered at the Street Musicians Festival (Festival uličnih svirača) in Novi Sad in 2016. The play has been performed over 100 times in Serbia and abroad. The play was directed by Višnja Obradović.

=== New Balkan Rhythm festival ===
Alice in WonderBand, i.e. the association "Open Circle Novi Sad", as part of the promotion of body music, has been organizing the international body music festival "New Balkan Rhythm" since 2022 in Sremski Karlovci, Serbia. Until 2025, it had four annual editions with lecturers and participants from all over the world. The festival has an educational and performing character.

== Discography ==
=== Albums ===
- ″RikaTaka, New Balkan Rhythm″ (2022)

=== Singles ===
- Mene majka jednu ima (RikaTaka, New Balkan Rhythm)
- Uči me, majko, karaj me (RikaTaka, New Balkan Rhythm)
- Cigančica (RikaTaka, New Balkan Rhythm)
- Jovano, Jovanke (RikaTaka, New Balkan Rhythm)
- Ergen dedo (RikaTaka, New Balkan Rhythm)
- Sojka ptica (RikaTaka, New Balkan Rhythm)
- Zajdi, zajdi (RikaTaka, New Balkan Rhythm)
- Ruse kose (RikaTaka, New Balkan Rhythm)
- Mesečinka (RikaTaka, New Balkan Rhythm)
- Bratec kosio (RikaTaka, New Balkan Rhythm)
- Túl a vizen (RikaTaka, New Balkan Rhythm)
- Bun îi vinul ghiurghiuliu (RikaTaka, New Balkan Rhythm)
- Nane tsokha (RikaTaka, New Balkan Rhythm)
- Bukuroshja E Lales (RikaTaka, New Balkan Rhythm)
