= 192 (song) =

"192 92"

Song by Elena Risteska

from the album 192 & Milioner
- Released: 14 January 2007
- Recorded: 2006/2008
- Genre: Pop, R&B
- Length: 4:05 (Macedonian version); 03:45 (Serbian version)
- Label: M2 Production, City Records
- Songwriters: Darko Dimitrov, Elena Risteska, Aida Baraku
- Producer: Darko Dimitrov

"192" (in Macedonian read as: Еден, девет, двa) is a song by the Macedonian singer and songwriter Elena Risteska from her second album with the same name. 192 is the three-digit telephone number for the police in North Macedonia. In 2008, a Serbian version of the song was realized under the title 92. The Serbian version is included in Milioner.
