= Lambe Alabakovski =

Macedonian singer

- Born: 15 November 1987 (age 38); Ljubojno, SFR Yugoslavia (present-day North Macedonia)
- Genres: Pop
- Occupations: Singer
- Years active: 2004–present

Lambe Alabakovski (Macedonian: Ламбе Алабаковски, pronounced [la'mbɛ aɫaba'kɔfski]; born 15 November 1987, in Ljubojno, SFR Yugoslavia) is a Macedonian singer.

== Biography ==
Alabakovski attended the Euro-College in Kumanovo. He won the M2 Production's Play: Search For A New Star 2004. He made it to the finals and performed the hit "Spasi Me" ("Save Me"), composed by Darko Dimitrov and won by the televoting audience. Alabakovski was signed to the M2 Production's label. In 2005, Alabakovski recorded his next single, "Kade Pesno Moja" ("Where, My Song"), a cover of a song by Slave Dimitrov, which was the first Macedonian song to be sold as an internet download.

In 2005, Alabakovski, along with former M2 colleague, Aleksandra Pileva, traveled to Braşov, Romania to participate in the Golden Stag Festival. He performed his Macedonian hit "Kade Pesno Moja" and a Romanian song called "Dragostea Mea". Later that year in October, he took part in the annual Macedonia festival, Makfest 2005, where he promoted his new song "Eh Da Mozam" ("If I Could"). During the holidays, Alabakovski released another single called "Kazano E Sè" ("Everything is Said").

During February 2006, Alabakovski took part in a charity song called "Otvori Oci" ("Open Your Eyes") written by Darko Dimitrov, in which the Macedonian divas Elena Risteska, Kaliopi, as well as Aleksandra Pileva, Adrian Gaxha and Maja Grozdanovska-Pancheva participated. Shortly after that, MKTV revealed the list of participants for the national Macedonian Eurovision selection for 2006 and Alabakovski was a participant with the song "More od Solzi" ("Sea of Tears") written by Darko Dimitrov and lyrics by Elena Risteska. In March, Alabakovski and nineteen other artists took the stage in Skopje to compete for first place. He scored third place with 5282 points. Alabakovski released his debut album titled More od Solzi, which contained 10 song composed of his past hits and some new material. In June, he competed in the Budva festival in Montenegro with a Serbian song and in a duet with Aleksandra Pileva. They reached the final with "Da Mogu Vreme Vratiti" and finished in 12th place.

Alabakovski competed at Skopje Fest 2007, the Macedonian Eurovision Song Selection. He performed the song "Belo e Se" which was written by Elena Risteska and composed by Robert Bilbilov. The song gained 101 points, placing Alabakovski in third position for a consecutive year. Alabakovski competed in the Macedonian Eurovision qualifier on 23 February 2008, with the song "Zemjo Moja".

== Personal life ==
Alabakovski moved to the US where he married his Macedonian-American girlfriend, Magdalena Jovčeska, in 2013. They have two sons together. The family returned to North Macedonia in 2021.

On 7 June 2022, he was arrested by police officers in Bitola, regarding the case of the fire at the Bulgarian cultural center "Ivan Mihaylov" in the city. Searches were conducted in his home, during which items related to the crime were found and confiscated. Alabakovski fully admitted the crime and later criminal charges were filed against him. The incident was condemned by the presidents and prime ministers of both countries. The club itself sent a letter of protest to the embassies of the US and EU member states in North Macedonia. He was put in custody and had his passport revoked, which was replaced by house arrest, until he was released on 14 June.

On 4 July, during the 2022 North Macedonia protests in Skopje, he burned a poster with the Treaty of Good Neighbourhood with Bulgaria, the Prespa Agreement with Greece and the French proposal for the start of the negotiation process of North Macedonia and EU. According to him, these documents are fascist. This came on the third day of protests organized by the nationalist opposition against the EU's proposal to approve the country's negotiating framework.

On September 7, 2022, he was given a six-month suspended sentence. On 20 April 2023 in a podcast, commenting the incident he says: "Seen from today's perspective, I am very joyful and happy with what I did...".

== Discography ==
=== Albums ===
- More od Solzi
- Vrati mi go Srceto
- Da ne te Ljubev (2009)

=== Singles ===
- Spasi Me (Save Me)
- Kade Pesno Moja (Where, My Song?)
- Eh Da Mozam (If I Could)
- Kazano E Se (It's All Said)
- More od solzi (Sea of tears)
- I Posle Se (And After Everything)
- Belo e Se (Everything's White)
- Vrati Mi Go Srceto ft. Darko Dimitrov (Give Me Back My Heart)
- Zemjo Moja (My Land)
- Se e po staro (Everything is same)
- Da ne te ljubev (If I didn't love you)
- Najdobro do sega feat Elena Risteska (The best ever )
- Bidi prijatel nas – oficijalna himna na SOS, Makedonija (Be our friend -the official anthem of SOS, Macedonia )
- Zar ne e dobro (Isn't it good)
- Koga sonce gree, placham (When the sun shines, I cry)

== Awards ==
- (2006) Hit of the Year for the song "More od Solzi" (as voted by the listeners of Radio Fortuna)

Awards and achievements
Preceded by Vlatko Ilievski	Skopje Fest; Winner; 2013	Succeeded by Daniel Kajmakoski
