= Regina (Bosnian band) =

Band from Bosnia and Herzegovina

Grupa Regina
- Also known as: Regina
- Origin: Sarajevo, SFR Yugoslavia (now Bosnia and Herzegovina)
- Genre: Rock
- Years active: 1989–2000; 2005–present
- Members: Aleksandar Čović; Bojan Milićević
- Past members: Davor Ebner; Denis Čabrić

Grupa Regina is a Bosnian rock band founded in 1990 in Sarajevo, Bosnia and Herzegovina, then part of Yugoslavia. The band has so far released thirteen studio albums, four compilation albums and two singles.

Regina is a Bosnian rock band founded in 1990 in Sarajevo. Aleksandar Čović, Bojan Milicević, Bojan Milijaš, Boris Milijaš and Goran Lučić founded an amateur band in 1990, but the problem was the lack of singers. They soon found Davor Ebner. In the same year, Regina released her first album, Regina. The author of the lyrics and music of the band was frontman Aleksandar Čović.

== History ==
=== Beginnings and success ===
Logo

Aleksandar Čović, Goran Lučić, and the Milijaš brothers began a garage band. After searching, they found Davor Ebner, who became their lead singer. Bojan Milićević joined the group in 1990 (before the release of the first album). Once the band was created, it was immediately successful all over Yugoslavia with the slogan "MI NISMO MERLIN, MI SMO REGINA" ("We aren't Merlin, we're Regina").

When the Yugoslav Wars began in Bosnia and Herzegovina, Serb members of the band fled to Belgrade, where Regina continued until 2000, when Čović started his solo career. In 2005, the band reunited with the original members and appeared at a Serbian radio festival organized by Radio S. In 2007, they were an opening act at The Rolling Stones concert at Jaz Beach, Budva.

=== Eurovision 2009 ===
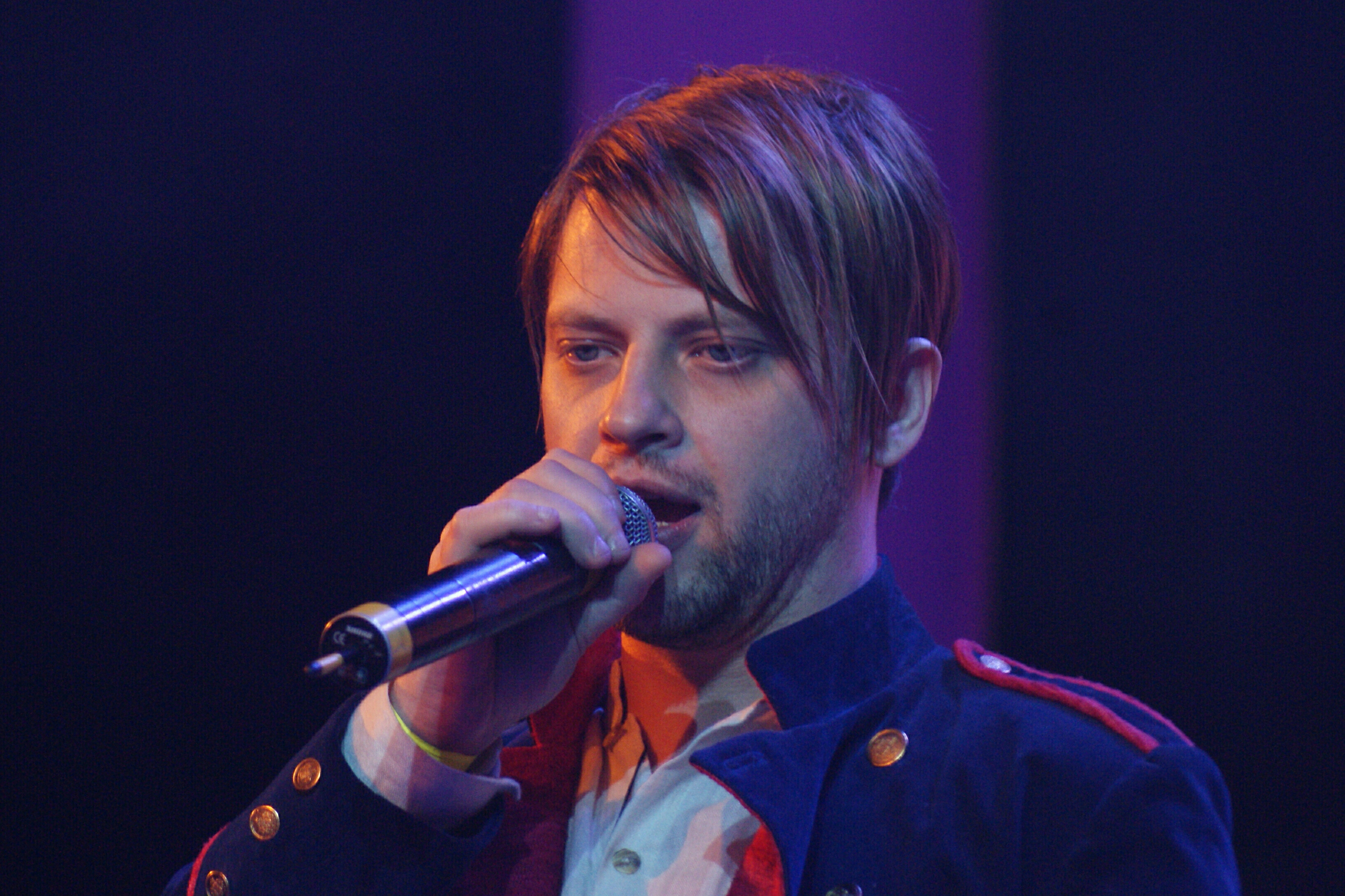
Davor Ebner, Regina's lead vocalist, performing at the Eurovision Song Contest 2009 with the band.

On 16 May 2009, the band performed in the Eurovision Song Contest 2009, with the song called "Bistra voda" ("Clear Water"). After winning one of ten places from the first semi-final, they eventually finished in 9th place in the final (with 106 points).

=== Post-Eurovision ===
In June 2009, Regina released their album Vrijeme je (It's Time), featuring the songs Vrijeme je, Bježi dok sam mlad and Zvaću te pile moje. It also features English and Russian versions of Bistra Voda. In 2011, Regina released their album Kad poludimo (When we go crazy). In 2014, the band released the singles Kalimero and Zatupi Zaglupi. In 2016, Regina published their biography called Ljubav nije za nas (Love isn't for us). On 16 August 2016, bassist Denis Čabrić died of a heart attack on holiday in Croatia with his family at the age of 49.

On 10 February 2017, the band released their 12th studio album called U Srcu (In the Heart).

In late December 2022, it was stated and confirmed that Davor Ebner, Regina's lead vocalist, left the band to pursue a solo career.

== Discography ==
=== Studio albums ===
- Regina (1990)
- Ljubav nije za nas (1991)
- Regina (1992)
- Jedino ono što imam da dam (1993)
- Pogledaj u nebo (1995)
- Godine lete (1995)
- Ja nisam kao drugi (1997)
- Kad zatvorim oči (1999)
- Deset (2000)
- Sve mogu ja (2006)
- Vrijeme je (2009)
- Kad poludimo (2012)
- U srcu (2017)

=== Compilation albums ===
- Oteto od zaborava (1994)
- Devedesete (1996)
- Greatest Hits Collection (2017)
- 2018 (2018)

=== Singles ===
- Kalimero (2014)
- Zatupi Zaglupi (2014)

Preceded by Elvir Laković Laka with "Pokušaj"	Bosnia and Herzegovina in the Eurovision Song Contest; 2009	Succeeded by Vukašin Brajić with "Thunder and Lightning"
