= More Sokol Pie =

"More Sokol Pie Море сокол пие"

Single by Various
- Released: 1837
- Genre: Folk
- Songwriters: Traditional, see text.

'More Sokol Pie (English: A Falcon is Drinking) is a traditional folk song from the region of Macedonia, particularly popular in Bulgaria and North Macedonia. There are several versions of this song. Probably the earliest record of an early version of this song was in 1837, by Serbian author Petar Petrović Samopodlužanin. The song was recorded by Podlužanin from a Bulgarian immigrant in Serbia and in the text there are Serbian language influences made either by the person recording or by the person relating the lyrics. Many other versions of this song with motif of falcon drinking water from Vardar were published at the beginning of the 20th century in then Southern Serbia. Numerous performers of this song include Toše Proeski, Hanka Paldum, Kostadin Gugov, Aleksandar Sarievski, Nikola Badev, Volodya Stoyanov and "Episode" group.
