= Aida Baraku =

Albanian Kosovar singer, composer, journalist and television producer

- Known for: Singer, composer, journalist, television producer

Aida Baraku is an Albanian Kosovar singer, composer, and journalist.

== Life ==
Baraku worked for newspapers like "Zëri" and "Koha Ditore". She worked as a director for the entertainment shows at Radio Televizioni i Kosovës.

Together with her husband, they ran the first seasons of "E Diell" (It's Sunday), a Sunday-show at Top Channel which was one of the most watched shows in the Albanian-speaking territories during that time. She has two sisters.
