= Vrčak =

Vrčak Врчак Vrchak Раде Врчаковски
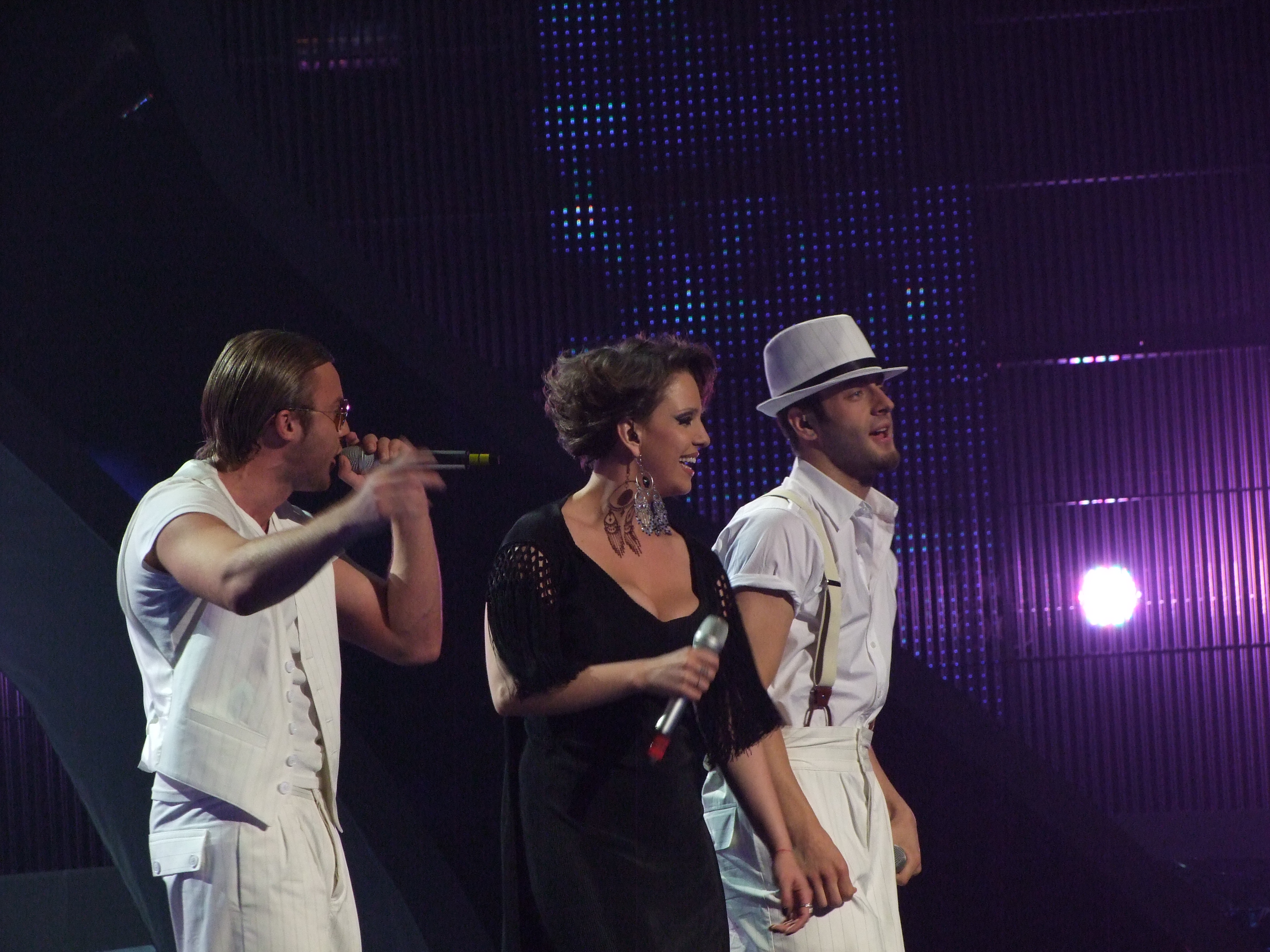

Background information
- Also known as: Vrčak
- Born: Rade Vrčakovski; 17 November 1980 (age 45); Strumica, SR Macedonia, SFR Yugoslavia
- Origin: North Macedonia
- Genres: Pop-rap, Pop, Trap, Psychedelic trance
- Occupations: Singer, songwriter
- Years active: 1999–2009

Rade Vrčakovski (Macedonian: Раде Врчаковски [ˈraːdɛ vr̩ˈt͡ʃakɔfski]; born 17 November 1980 in Strumica) better known by his stage name Vrčak (Врчак) is a Macedonian singer.

He represented Macedonia at the Eurovision Song Contest 2008, performing the song "Let Me Love You" along with Tamara Todevska and Adrian Gaxha.

== Biography ==
Internationally, he is known for writing the lyrics for "Ninanajna", the song with which Elena Risteska represented North Macedonia at the 2006 Eurovision song contest. Vrčak is a Medicine student at the University of Cyril and Methodius in Skopje but chose a career in music, following the footsteps of his father. Vrčak's latest album, Vo tvoeto srce, was released in 2006 and was a huge success within North Macedonia, as it was one of the biggest selling albums in the country. Singles from the album received heavy airplay on the Macedonian TV and Radio stations. The album gave him a successful musical come-back, making him one of the most popular artist in North Macedonia.

In 2001, Vrčak performed at Makfest, even though his first album, Kako Da Pobegnam Od Sè, was released in 1999. He performed with Andrijana Janevska and placed third in the competition. In 2004, he performed on Makfest once again, however, this time he had a duet with Robert Bilbilov which landed him the third spot once again, though it was not his last performance at Makfest. In 2006, his duet with Tamara Todevska earned him first place in the competition. Vrčak, along with Tamara Todevska and Adrian Gaxha, represented North Macedonia at the Eurovision Song Contest 2008, after having won the Macedonian qualifier with the song "Vo Ime Na Ljubovta".

== Discography ==
=== Albums ===
- Kako Da Pobegnam Od Sè (1999)
- Vo Tvoeto Srce (2006)
- Na sedmo nebo (2009)

== See also ==
- Music of the Republic of Macedonia
- Macedonian hip hop

Awards and achievements
Preceded by Karolina Gočeva with "Mojot svet"	Macedonia in the Eurovision Song Contest (with Tamara and Adrian); 2008	Succeeded by Next Time with "Nešto što kje ostane"
