= Darko Dimitrov =

Darko Dimitrov Дарко Димитров
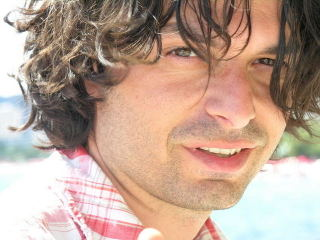
- Dimitrov in 2004

Background information
- Born: 21 January 1973 (age 53); Skopje, SR Macedonia, Yugoslavia (now North Macedonia)
- Origin: North Macedonia
- Genres: Pop, Dance-pop, Hip Hop, Contemporary R&B, Pop-rap
- Occupations: Songwriter, Record producer, Arranger, musician
- Years active: 1991 – present
- Label: M2 Productions

Darko Dimitrov (Macedonian: Дарко Димитров [ˈdarkɔ ˈdimitrɔf]; born 21 January 1973) is a Macedonian songwriter, record producer, arranger and record executive. Highly acclaimed for revitalising the Yugoslav mainstream pop music scene, which also influenced the surrounding Balkan countries, he has received international recognition for working with many popular foreign artists.

== Biography ==
Darko Dimitrov was born on 21 January 1973 in Skopje, SFR Yugoslavia (present-day North Macedonia), to prominent Macedonian singer and composer, Slave Dimitrov. His family has a rich musical history—his grandfather was the prominent opera and traditional music singer, Blagoja Petrov Karagjule. Darko Dimitrov graduated at the Academy of Music in Skopje and he works in his family recording studio called 'Studio Dimitrovi' along with his father and his brother Oliver, the latter being notable for producing the debut album of the ska-punk band, Superhiks.

One of his first production hits was "Otvori go Pendžerčeto", performed by the rap group Nulta Pozitiv and featuring the popular folk singer, Mitre Mitrevski.

After producing for mostly hip hop and pop rap oriented artists during the early 90s, Darko Dimitrov moved on to work in the pop music industry. From 1996 onwards, he produced several chart-topping hits for many artists of the Balkan era and Turkey such as Nokaut, Karolina Gočeva, Toše Proeski, Kaliopi, Elena Risteska, Jovan Jovanov, Tamara Todevska, Tijana Dapčević, Vlado Janevski, Lambe Alabakoski, Vrčak, Vlatko Lozanoski, Esma Redžepova, Darko Pančev's wife Maja Grozdanovska Pančeva, Besa, Elhaida Dani, Gentiana Ismajli, Anjeza Shahini, Ledina Çelo, Leonora Jakupi, Rosela Gjylbegu, Altuna Sejdiu, Jonida Maliqi, Vesa Luma, Rovena Stefa, Pirro Cako, Juliana Pasha, Kejsi Tola, Greta Koci, Elvana Gjata, Aurela Gaçe, Xhensila Myrtezaj, Rafet El Roman, Aleksandra Radović, Jelena Tomašević, Ivo Gamulin, Jovana Nikolić, Sergej Ćetković, Hari Varešanović, Emina Jahović, Arilena Ara, Marija Šerifović, Željko Joksimović, Eye Cue, Edis Görgülü, Jelena Rozga, Severina, Nataša Bekvalac, Anastasija Ražnatović, Anxhela Peristeri, Vlaho, Hurricane, Lexington, Elena Kitić, Lena Kovačević, Yll Limani, Adelina Tahiri, Nina Žižić, among many other domestic and foreign pop stars.

In 1999, Dimitrov released a compilation album, featuring music from various artists which he has produced. The album 100% Hits: The Best of Darko Dimitrov broke national sales records.

His songs have participated in many notable pop music festivals such as Skopje Fest, MakFest, Ohrid Fest, Sunčane Skale and the Budva Music Festival in Montenegro, the FERAS Radio Festival in Serbia, Croatian Radio Festival, the Split Festival in Croatia, Dora Croatia, the Pamukkale Festival in Turkey, the Golden Stag in Romania, Kënga Magjike in Albania and the 2006 European Song Festival for Children with Special Needs, Junior Eurovision Song Contest 2011, 2018, and 2023.

Dimitrov produced and composed "Ninanajna", the Macedonian entry in the 2006 Eurovision Song Contest. The song was performed in both the Macedonian and English languages by Elena Risteska and placed 12th with 56 points, giving the nation its best result until 2019. He also wrote the song "Ne voliš je znam" which was performed by Marija Šerifović at the opening show of the Eurovision Song Contest 2008 in Belgrade.

He again participated in the Eurovision Song Contest 2013 and 2014 as a co-writer and co-composer of Macedonian entries; "Pred da se razdeni" (Before the sunrise), performed by Esma Redžepova and Vlatko Lozanoski in 2013, and "To The Sky" performed by Tijana Dapčević in 2014. Both entries failed to qualify for the grand final.

In 2015, Dimitrov arranged and produced the entry for Albania in the Eurovision Song Contest 2015, "I'm Alive", performed by Elhaida Dani, placing 17th with 34 points.

In 2018 and 2019, Dimitrov co-wrote both North Macedonia's and Serbia's entries in the Eurovision Song Contest, including the song "Proud" which placed 7th overall in the 2019 contest, and gave North Macedonia its best result to date.

Darko Dimitrov has won over 30 awards in the 'best producer', 'best composer' and 'best arranger' categories. and his songs won more than 100 awards. "Proud" won 1st place from jury on Eurovision Song Contest 2019 and 7th overall. He co-founded the M2 Productions record label along with Ivo Jankovski and worked with many productions in Europe.

The songs he produced have more than 1 billion YouTube views in total.

M2 Productions has organised several talent shows, from which several current Macedonian pop stars emerged. Among these include Elena Risteska, Tuna, Lambe Alabakoski, Aleksandra Pileva, 4play, Emil Arsov, Dimitar Andonovski and Bojana Atanasovska.

== Eurovision Song Contest entries ==
Country	Year	Song	Artist	Place	Points	Songwriter	Producer
North Macedonia	2006	"Ninanajna" (Нинанајна)	Elena Risteska	12	56	Yes	Yes
North Macedonia	2013	"Pred da se razdeni" (Пред да се раздени)	Esma and Lozano	Failed to qualify		Yes	Yes
North Macedonia	2014	"To the Sky"	Tijana Dapčević	Failed to qualify		Yes	Yes
Albania	2015	"I'm Alive"	Elhaida Dani	17	34	No	Yes
North Macedonia	2018	"Lost and Found"	Eye Cue	Failed to qualify		Yes	Yes
Serbia	2018	"Nova deca" (Нова деца)	Sanja Ilić and Balkanika	19	113	No	Yes
North Macedonia	2019	"Proud"	Tamara Todevska	7	305	Yes	Yes
Serbia	2019	"Kruna" (Круна)	Nevena Božović	18	89	No	Yes
Albania	2020	"Fall from the Sky"	Arilena Ara	Cancelled		Yes	Yes
North Macedonia	2020	"You"	Vasil	Cancelled		No	Yes
Serbia	2021	"Loco Loco"	Hurricane	15	102	Yes	Yes
Montenegro	2022	"Breathe"	Vladana	Failed to qualify		Yes	Yes
Georgia	2024	"Firefighter"	Nutsa Buzaladze	21	34	Yes	Yes
Montenegro	2025	"Dobrodošli" (Добродошли)	Nina Žižić	Failed to qualify		Yes	Yes

=== Junior Eurovision entries ===
Country	Year	Song	Artist	Place	Points	Songwriter	Producer
North Macedonia	2010	"Eooo, Eooo" (Eooo, Eooo)	Anja Veterova	12	38	Yes	Yes
North Macedonia	2018	"Doma" (Дома)	Marija Spasovska	12	99	Yes	Yes
North Macedonia	2022	"Životot e pred mene" (Животот е пред мене)	Lara feat. Jovan and Irina	14	54	Yes	Yes
North Macedonia	2023	"Kaži mi, kaži mi koj" (Кажи ми, кажи ми кој)	Tamara Grujeska	12	76	No	Yes

== See also ==
- Music of North Macedonia
- North Macedonia in the Eurovision Song Contest
- Macedonian hip hop
