= Latvia in the Junior Eurovision Song Contest 2003 =

- Junior Eurovision Song Contest 2003
- Participating broadcaster: Latvijas Televīzija (LTV)
- Country: Latvia
- Selection process: National final
- Selection date: 8 June 2003

Competing entry
- Song: "Tu esi vasarā"
- Artist: Dzintars Čīča
- Songwriter: Dzintars Čīča

Placement
- Final result: 9th, 37 points

Participation chronology

Latvia was represented at the Junior Eurovision Song Contest 2003 with the song "Tu esi vasarā", written and performed by Dzintars Čīča. The Latvian participating broadcaster Latvijas Televīzija (LTV) organised a national final in order to select its entry for the contest. This was the first-ever entry from Latvia in the Junior Eurovision Song Contest.

== Before Junior Eurovision ==
=== National final ===
56 songs were submitted to Latvijas Televīzija (LTV). Ten entries were selected for the national final, and the competing artists and songs were announced on 17 March 2003.

The final took place on 8 June 2003, hosted by Linda Leen and Horens Stalbe. The interval act was F.L.Y. with the songs "Hello from Mars" and "7 Days". Ten entries competed and the song with the highest number of votes from the public, "Tu esi vasarā" performed by Dzintars Čīča, was declared the winner.

Final – 8 June 2003
R/O	Artist	Song	Televote	Place
1	Gatis Freimanis	"Āfrika"	1,039	8
2	Eva Burtniece	"Dažkārt"	870	9
3	Līvija Daudze	"Smilšu pils"	639	10
4	Sabīne Berezina	"Saules stari"	3,132	3
5	Miks Dukurs	"Mana sirds"	4,610	2
6	Alīna Razumnaja	"Es..."	2,340	4
7	Edgars Šmiukšis	"Bungas dzied"	1,212	7
8	Dzintars Čīča	"Tu esi vasarā"	11,993	1
9	Ieva Stāmere	"Zvaigznes un melodijas"	1,868	5
10	Madara Viktorova	"Es gribu zināt"	1,621	6

== At Junior Eurovision ==
=== Voting ===
Points awarded to Latvia
Score	Country
12 points	
10 points	
8 points	Belarus
7 points	
6 points	Netherlands
5 points	Croatia
4 points	Macedonia
3 points	Belgium; Malta; Norway; Poland
2 points	
1 point	Romania; United Kingdom

Points awarded by Latvia
Score	Country
12 points	Spain
10 points	Belarus
8 points	Croatia
7 points	United Kingdom
6 points	Denmark
5 points	Greece
4 points	Belgium
3 points	Norway
2 points	Romania
1 point	Malta
