= Belgium in the Junior Eurovision Song Contest 2003 =

- Junior Eurovision Song Contest 2003
- Participating broadcaster: Vlaamse Radio- en Televisieomroeporganisatie (VRT)
- Country: Belgium
- Selection process: Eurosong for Kids 2003
- Selection date: 21 September 2003

Competing entry
- Song: "De vriendschapsband"
- Artist: X!NK
- Songwriters: Jonas Meukens; Thomas Valkiers

Placement
- Final result: 6th, 83 points

Participation chronology

Belgium was represented at the Junior Eurovision Song Contest 2003 with the song "De vriendschapsband", written by Jonas Meukens and Thomas Valkiers, and performed by X!NK. The Belgian participating broadcaster, Vlaamse Radio- en Televisieomroeporganisatie (VRT), selected its entry for the contest through Eurosong for Kids 2003. This was the first-ever entry from Belgium in the Junior Eurovision Song Contest.

== Before Junior Eurovision ==
=== Eurosong for Kids 2003 ===
The 10 semi-finalists of Eurosong for Kids 2003 were revealed in the introduction show on 31 August 2003 and broadcast on TV1.

The hosts of the shows were Bart Peeters and Ilse Van Hoecke. The adult jury consisted of Geena Lisa Peeters, Marcel Vanthilt, Miguel Wiels and a guest jury. The common song was “Wereld vol muziek”.

==== Format ====
Eurosong for Kids 2003 consisted of two semi-finals and one final. Each semi-final consisted of 5 participants. The winners of the semi-finals and three best scoring participants in the semi-finals qualified for the final. The final consisted of 5 participants. The results were decided by 1/7 adult jury, 1/7 Ketnet jury, 1/7 Radio 2 jury, 1/7 Radio Donna jury, 1/7 press jury and 2/7 televoting. (Note: Televoting was labeled as TV1 jury)

==== Semi-Finals ====
The Semi-Finals were held on 7 and 14 September 2003 at 19:40 CEST and broadcast on TV1.

Semi Final 1 – 7 September 2003
R/O	Artist	Song	Adult jury	Ketnet jury	Radio 2 jury	Radio Donna jury	Press jury	Televoting	Points	Place
1	Charlotte	“Hey kids hier”	9	9	9	8	9	18	62	4
2	X!NK	“De vriendschapsband”	11	12	11	10	10	22	76	2
3	Kia	“Geen antwoord”	8	8	8	9	8	16	57	5
4	Martijn	“Ik word je popidool”	10	10	12	12	12	20	76	3
5	Laura	“Wees zeker”	12	11	10	12	11	24	79	1

Semi Final 2 – 14 September 2003
R/O	Artist	Song	Adult jury	Ketnet jury	Radio 2 jury	Radio Donna jury	Press jury	Televoting	Points	Place
1	Twin Girls	“Plezier voor twee”	9	8	12	12	9	16	66	4
2	Remi	“Duizend dromen”	12	9	11	11	11	22	76	2
3	Tonya	“Hé doe maar mee”	11	11	10	9	12	24	77	1
4	Simon MC	“Rapklap”	10	10	8	10	10	20	68	3
5	Jelly Pie	“Groen”	8	12	9	8	8	18	63	5

==== Final ====
The final was held on 21 September 2003 at 19:40 CEST and broadcast on TV1. The final was opened with the participants singing the common song. Interval act in the final was Sarah and Koen Wauters with “You Are the Reason”.

Final – 21 September 2003
R/O	Artist	Song	Adult jury	Ketnet jury	Radio 2 jury	Radio Donna jury	Press jury	Televoting	Total	Place
1	Laura	“Wees zeker”	11	11	11	9	8	18	68	3
2	Martijn	“Ik word je popidool”	8	10	10	8	9	16	61	5
3	X!NK	“De vriendschapsband”	12	12	8	12	11	24	79	1
4	Tonya	“Hé doe maar mee”	10	9	12	11	12	22	76	2
5	Remi	“Duizend dromen”	9	8	9	10	10	20	66	4

== At Junior Eurovision ==
At the running order draw, Belgium were drawn to perform eleventh on 15 November 2003, following Romania and preceding United Kingdom.

=== Voting ===
Points awarded to Belgium
Score	Country
12 points	Netherlands
10 points	
8 points	Spain
7 points	Belarus; Denmark
6 points	Croatia; Macedonia; Poland; United Kingdom
5 points	Sweden
4 points	Latvia; Malta; Norway
3 points	Greece; Romania
2 points	Cyprus
1 point	

Points awarded by Belgium
Score	Country
12 points	Netherlands
10 points	Spain
8 points	Croatia
7 points	Denmark
6 points	Romania
5 points	Belarus
4 points	United Kingdom
3 points	Latvia
2 points	Greece
1 point	Malta
