= Sweden in the Junior Eurovision Song Contest 2003 =

- Junior Eurovision Song Contest 2003
- Participating broadcaster: Sveriges Television (SVT)
- Country: Sweden
- Selection process: Lilla Melodifestivalen 2003
- Selection date: 4 October 2003

Competing entry
- Song: "Stoppa mig"
- Artist: The Honeypies
- Songwriter: Rebecca Laakso

Placement
- Final result: 15th, 12 points

Participation chronology

Sweden was represented at the Junior Eurovision Song Contest 2003 with the song "Stoppa mig", written by Rebecca Laakso, and performed by The Honeypies. The Swedish participating broadcaster, Sveriges Television (SVT), organised Lilla Melodifestivalen 2003 to select its entry for the contest. This was the first-ever entry from Sweden in the Junior Eurovision Song Contest.

== Before Junior Eurovision ==
=== Lilla Melodifestivalen 2003 ===
Sveriges Television (SVT) held a national final to select the Swedish entry to the Junior Eurovision Song Contest 2003. Lilla Melodifestivalen 2003. The submission window for Lilla Melodifestivalen 2003 was opened until 6 June 2003. By the deadline, over 1300 entries were received, which from ten were selected as finalists and were revealed on 10 September 2003.

The final took place on 4 October at the SVT Television Centre in Stockholm. The show was hosted by children's TV host Victoria Dyring. Dilba performed an interval act with "Diamonds and Motorcars".

Ten songs competed in the contest, with the winner decided by regional juries from Sundsvall, Gothenburg, Vaxjö, Malmö and Stockholm, and televoting. Each regional jury gave 4, 6, 8, 10 and 12 points to each entry, with the rest of the entries receiving 2 points, while the televoting awarded 20, 30, 40, 50 and 60 points to each entry, with the rest of the entries receing 10 points.

R/O	Artist	Song	Songwriter(s)	Jury	Televote	Total	Place
1	Wednesday	"Det är så det ska va'"	Daniel Edenvik; Paul Jacks; Mathias Thorhede	28	40	68	3
2	Vera and Vendela	"Vänner"	Vendela Blomgren	12	10	22	9
3	Daniel and Lukas	"Data-hop"	Lukas Jakobsson; Daniel Sjögren-Larsson	24	20	44	6
4	Sofie Ljungberg	"Du finns i mitt hjärta"	Sofie Ljungberg	38	30	68	4
5	V.Ä.N.N.E.R	"För du är min vän"	Sofia Beckman; Julia Gustafsson; Frida Jansson	20	10	30	8
6	Sebbe	"Om jag gillar nå'n"	Sebastian Boström	22	10	32	7
7	The Honeypies	"Stoppa mig!"	Rebecca Laakso	32	50	82	1
8	Dragonheartz	"Om du"	Maria-Pia Colton; Felicia Jeverin; Jennifer Larsson	12	10	22	10
9	Patrik	"Sommarsol"	Patrik Olsson	42	10	52	5
10	Felix Hvit	"För den jag är"	Felix Hvit	20	60	80	2

Detailed jury votes
R/O	Song	Sundsvall	Gothenburg	Växjö	Malmö	Stockholm	Total
1	"Det är så det ska va'"	2	2	12	8	4	28
2	"Vänner"	4	2	2	2	2	12
3	"Data-hop"	10	2	2	2	8	24
4	"Du finns i mitt hjärta"	6	8	4	10	10	38
5	"För du är min vän"	12	2	2	2	2	20
6	"Om jag gillar nå'n"	2	6	2	6	6	22
7	"Stoppa mig!"	2	10	6	12	2	32
8	"Om du"	2	2	2	4	2	12
9	"Sommarsol"	8	12	8	2	12	42
10	"För den jag är"	2	4	10	2	2	20
Jury spokespersons
Sundsvall – Martin Brattmyr; Gothenburg – Felicia Hansen; Växjö – Alice Wernbro; Malmö – Mikael Marklund; Stockholm – Siri Lindgren

== At Junior Eurovision ==
On the night of the contest, held in Copenhagen in Denmark, the Honeypies performed 14th in the running order of the contest, following Denmark and preceding Malta. At the close of the voting the duo received 12 points, placing 15th of the 16 competing entries.

=== Voting ===
Points awarded to Sweden
Score	Country
12 points	
10 points	
8 points	
7 points	
6 points	
5 points	Denmark
4 points	
3 points	Spain
2 points	Norway
1 point	Cyprus; Malta

Points awarded by Sweden
Score	Country
12 points	Denmark
10 points	United Kingdom
8 points	Croatia
7 points	Belarus
6 points	Spain
5 points	Belgium
4 points	Norway
3 points	Greece
2 points	Malta
1 point	Macedonia
