= Macedonia in the Junior Eurovision Song Contest 2003 =

- Junior Eurovision Song Contest 2003
- Participating broadcaster: Macedonian Radio Television (MRT)
- Country: Macedonia
- Selection process: National final
- Selection date: 28 June 2003

Competing entry
- Song: "Ti ne me poznavaš"
- Artist: Marija and Viktorija
- Songwriter: Irena Galabovska

Placement
- Final result: 12th, 19 points

Participation chronology

Macedonia (Note: Presented under the provisional appellation "former Yugoslav Republic of Macedonia", abbreviated "FYR Macedonia".) was represented at the Junior Eurovision Song Contest 2003 with the song “Ti ne me poznavaš”, written by Irena Galabovska, and performed by Marija and Viktorija. The Macedonian participating broadcaster, Macedonian Radio Television (MRT), selected its entry for the contest through a national final. This was the first-ever entry from Macedonia in the Junior Eurovision Song Contest.

== Before Junior Eurovision ==
=== National final ===
Macedonian Radio Television (MRT) opened the submission window for songs from 1 February until 31 March 2003. From the singers submission window, 113 applications were received and from the song submission window, 32 songs were received. The jury of selecting the singers and songs consisted of Aleksandar Trposki, Iva Blaževska, Ivana Talevska, Kire Kostov, Kiril Josifov, Ljupčo Mirkovski, Tatjana Gogovska and Vančo Dimitrov.

The first round of auditions were held in the M2 studio of MRT on 19 April 2003. The songs that passed to the final were announced on 22 April 2003. From the 113 singers, 57 singers were selected to the second round of auditions held on 10 May 2003. From the second round of auditions, the 25 potential performers were chosen with the 10 songs. The performers that qualified for the final were revealed on 25 April 2003.

The final was originally planned to be held on 14 June 2003 but was delayed to 28 June 2003. The show was held at Studio C of MRT and was broadcast on MTV 2 and MKTV Sat. The show was hosted by Rašela Ginovska. The results of the national selection were decided by 50% jury and 50% televoting.

Key: Winner Second place

Final - 28 June 2003
R/O	Artist	Song	Songwriter(s)	Place
1	Teodora Trajkovska	“Sonuvam” (“Сонувам”)	Teodora Trajkovska	—N/a
2	Monika Kitanovska	“Ljubovta dviži se” (“Љубовта движи се”)	Monika Kitanovska	—N/a
3	Marija Arsovska, Viktorija Loba and Irena Galabovska	“Ti ne me poznavaš” (“Ти не ме познаваш”)	Irena Galabovska	1
4	Angela Ljamova and Ivet Caro	“Šareni peperutki” (“Шарени пеперутки”)	Ivana Karalieva	—N/a
5	Boban Simonovski and Hristijan Dimitrievski	“Kako Hari Poter” (“Како Хари Потер”)	Alberto Grozdanov; Boban Mirkovski	—N/a
6	Verica Spasovska and Martina Siljanovska	“Bliznački” (“Близначки”)	Sofija Peševski; Stefanija Peševski	—N/a
7	David Miloševski, Goce Marotov and Goran Gelevski	“Čuden e ovoj svet” (“Чуден е овој свет”)	Katerina Piševa; Robert Mitrov	—N/a
8	Marija Hadžistojanova, Orhideja Dukova and Simona Poposka	“Do site deca” (“До сите деца”)	Katerina Piševa; Robert Mitrov	2
9	Bisera and Bojana Iliovski	“Ne sozdade ti” (“Не создаде ти”)	Martina Janevska; Nevenka Veljanovska	—N/a
10	Elisaveta Koševac, Maja Mihajlovska and Renata Kralevska	“Sakam da sum” (“Сакам да сум”)	Elisaveta Koševac	—N/a

=== Preparations ===
Before the Junior Eurovision Song Contest, it was decided that Irena Galabovska would be a backing singer instead of being one of the main singers. A music video was also filmed for the song.

== At Junior Eurovision ==
At the running order draw, Macedonia were drawn to perform sixth on 15 November 2003, following Latvia and preceding Poland.

=== Voting ===
Points awarded to Macedonia
Score	Country
12 points	
10 points	Croatia
8 points	
7 points	
6 points	
5 points	
4 points	Netherlands
3 points	
2 points	Belarus; Malta
1 point	Sweden

Points awarded by Macedonia
Score	Country
12 points	Croatia
10 points	Belarus
8 points	Spain
7 points	Denmark
6 points	Belgium
5 points	Romania
4 points	Latvia
3 points	United Kingdom
2 points	Norway
1 point	Greece
