= Macedonia in the Eurovision Song Contest 2015 =

- Eurovision Song Contest 2015
- Country: Macedonia
- Selection process: Skopje Fest 2014
- Selection date: 12 November 2014

Competing entry
- Song: "Autumn Leaves"
- Artist: Daniel Kajmakoski
- Songwriters: Joacim Persson; Robert Bilbilov

Placement
- Semi-final result: Failed to qualify (15th)

Participation chronology

Macedonia (Note: Officially under the provisional appellation "former Yugoslav Republic of Macedonia", abbreviated "FYR Macedonia".) was represented at the Eurovision Song Contest 2015 with the song "Autumn Leaves" written by Joacim Persson and Robert Bilbilov. The song was performed by Daniel Kajmakoski. The Macedonian broadcaster Macedonian Radio Television (MRT) organised Skopje Fest 2014 in order to select the Macedonian entry for the 2015 contest in Vienna, Austria. Twenty entries competed in the competition on 12 November 2014 where "Lisja esenski" performed by Daniel Kajmakoski was selected following the combination of votes from seven international jury groups and a public televote. The song was later translated from Macedonian to English for the Eurovision Song Contest and was titled "Autumn Leaves".

Macedonia was drawn to compete in the first semi-final of the Eurovision Song Contest which took place on 19 May 2015. Performing during the show in position 8, "Autumn Leaves" was not announced among the top 10 entries of the first semi-final and therefore did not qualify to compete in the final. It was later revealed that Macedonia placed fifteenth out of the 16 participating countries in the semi-final with 28 points.

== Background ==
Prior to the 2015 contest, Macedonia had participated in the Eurovision Song Contest fourteen times since its first entry in 1998. The nation's best result in the contest to this point was twelfth, which it achieved in 2006 with the song "Ninanajna" performed by Elena Risteska. Following the introduction of semi-finals for the 2004, Macedonia had featured in only five finals.

The Macedonian national broadcaster, Macedonian Radio Television (MRT), broadcasts the event within Macedonia and organises the selection process for the nation's entry. Macedonia had previously selected their entry for the Eurovision Song Contest through both national finals and internal selections. In June 2014, MRT held a survey on their website asking for advice regarding Macedonia's future participation in the Eurovision Song Contest. The three votable options provided were: continuing with internal selections used since 2012 that resulted in a single qualification to the final during this period in 2012, re-introduce the national final Skopje Fest used between 2008 and 2011 that failed to bring the nation to the final on every occasion, or withdrawing from the contest. Despite the option for withdrawal attracting the majority of the vote, MRT confirmed their intentions to participate at the 2015 Eurovision Song Contest on 15 July 2014 and announced that Skopje Fest would return to select the Macedonian entry.

== Before Eurovision ==
=== Skopje Fest 2014 ===
Skopje Fest 2014 was a song contest organised by MRT that served as Macedonia's national final to select their entry for the Eurovision Song Contest 2015. Twenty entries participated in the competition which took place on 12 November 2014 at the Metropolis Arena in Skopje, hosted by Vasil Zafircev and was broadcast on MRT 1, MRT Sat and online via the broadcaster's official website mrt.com.mk.

==== Competing entries ====
A submission period was opened for interested artists and composers to submit their songs between 26 May 2014 and 31 July 2014. MRT received over 180 submissions at the closing of the deadline. Thirteen entries were selected from the open submissions, while an additional seven entries were submitted by well-known composers directly invited by MRT for the competition. The twenty competing artists and songs were announced on 26 September 2014 during the MRT 1 programme Stisni Plej.

Among the competing artists were former Macedonian Eurovision Song Contest entrants: Tamara Todevska who represented Macedonia in 2008 and Vlatko Ilievski who represented Macedonia in 2011. Viktorija Loba represented Macedonia at the Junior Eurovision Song Contest 2003. Among the competing composers were Grigor Koprov, Jovan Jovanov, Lazar Cvetkoski, Magdalena Cvetkoska, Vlado Janevski and Vladimir Dojčinovski who co-wrote several Eurovision entries. Vlado Janevski also represented Macedonia at the Eurovision Song Contest 1998. On 28 October 2014, MRT announced that Nina Janeva would replace Sašo Gigov-Giš as the performer of the song "Bluz za...".

Artist	Song	Songwriter(s)
Aleksandar Tarabunov and Toni Mihajlovski	"Marija" (Мариjа)	Robert Bilbilov, Toni Mihajlovski
Aleksandra Janeva	"Vo tvojot svet" (Во твоjот свет)	Vančo Dimitrov, Ana Pandevska
Aleksandra Mihova	"Srce čuva spomeni" (Срце чува спомени)	Andrijana Janevska, Veronika Stojanovska
Daniel Kajmakoski	"Lisja esenski" (Лисjа есенски)	Joacim Persson, Aleksandar Mitevski, Daniel Kajmakoski
Dimitar Andonovski	"Se što ti vetiv" (Се што ти ветив)	Lazar Cvetkoski, Magdalena Cvetkoska
Evgenija Čančalova	"Da ne te sakam" (Да не те сакам)	Grigor Koprov, Jelena Bulinac
Goran Naumovski and Sanja Kerkez	"Mig bez tebe" (Миг без тебе)	Andrijana Janevska
Joce Panov	"Ni Lj od ljubovta" (Ни Љ од љубовта)	Saša Dragić, Vlado Janevski
Lena Zatkoska	"Alo" (Ало)	Risto Samardžiev
Lidija Kočovska and Marijan Stojanovski	"Sonce niz oblaci" (Сонце низ облаци)	Trajče Stavreski, Maja Pavlovska
Miyatta	"Zaljuben" (Заљубен)	Tanja Carovska
Nade Talevska	"Znam" (Знам)	Aleksandar Masevski, Biljana Pašarikovska
Nina Janeva	"Bluz za..." (Блуз за...)	Davor Jordanovski, Toni Mihajlovski
Risto Samardžiev and Vlatko Ilievski	"Sever-Jug" (Север-Jуг)	Vladimir Dojčinovski, Risto Samardžiev
Sanja Gjoševska	"Sakam da letam" (Сакам да летам)	Duke Bojadžiev
Tamara Todevska	"Brod što tone" (Брод што тоне)	Robert Bilbilov
Tanja Carovska	"Ako mi se vratiš" (Ако ми се вратиш)	Tanja Carovska
Vera Janković	"Se plašam" (Се плашам)	Darko Tasev, Vesna Malinova
Verica Pandilovska	"Samo za tebe" (Само за тебе)	Salvatore Monetti, Jasmina Kantardžieva
Viktorija Loba	"Edna edinstvena" (Една единствена)	Jovan Jovanov, Elvir Mekić

==== Final ====
The final took place on 12 November 2014. The running order was announced on 31 October 2014. All twenty competing entries were accompanied by the MRT orchestra, conducted by Ljupčo Mirkovski, and a 50/50 combination of public televoting and seven international jury groups selected "Lisja esenski" performed by Daniel Kajmakoski as the winner. Monetary prizes were also awarded to the top three songs: the winner received €20,000, the second place received €10,000 and the third place received €5,000. In addition to the performances of the competing entries, the competition featured guest performances by 2002 and 2007 Macedonian Eurovision representative Karolina Gočeva and 2012 Macedonian Eurovision representative Kaliopi.

Final – 12 November 2014
R/O	Artist	Song	Jury		Televote		Total	Place
R/O	Artist	Song	Votes	Points	Votes	Points	Total	Place
1	Lena Zatkoska	"Alo"	14	0	52	0	0	14
2	Tanja Carovska	"Ako mi se vratiš"	27	5	241	0	5	10
3	Daniel Kajmakoski	"Lisja esenski"	54	10	3,597	12	22	1
4	Vera Janković	"Se plašam"	4	0	70	0	0	14
5	Risto Samardžiev and Vlatko Ilievski	"Sever-Jug"	1	0	254	0	0	14
6	Evgenija Čančalova	"Da ne te sakam"	48	8	2,688	10	18	3
7	Aleksandra Mihova	"Srce čuva spomeni"	6	0	93	0	0	14
8	Lidija Kočovska and Marijan Stojanovski	"Sonce niz oblaci"	0	0	205	0	0	14
9	Joce Panov	"Ni Lj od ljubovta"	12	0	492	5	5	11
10	Goran Naumovski and Sanja Kerkez	"Mig bez tebe"	1	0	158	0	0	14
11	Aleksandar Tarabunov and Toni Mihajlovski	"Marija"	24	4	303	4	8	5
12	Aleksandra Janeva	"Vo tvojot svet"	21	3	295	3	6	9
13	Miyatta	"Zaljuben"	15	0	279	2	2	12
14	Tamara Todevska	"Brod što tone"	69	12	781	8	20	2
15	Sanja Gjoševska	"Sakam da letam"	32	6	228	0	6	8
16	Nade Talevska	"Znam"	38	7	226	0	7	6
17	Viktorija Loba	"Edna edinstvena"	6	0	735	7	7	7
18	Verica Pandilovska	"Samo za tebe"	0	0	50	0	0	14
19	Nina Janeva	"Bluz za..."	16	1	265	1	2	13
20	Dimitar Andonovski	"Se što ti vetiv"	18	2	674	6	8	4

Detailed International Jury Votes
R/O	Song	Austria	Azerbaijan	Bulgaria	Romania	Turkey	Netherlands	Croatia	Total
R/O	Song	Austria	Azerbaijan	Bulgaria	Romania	Turkey	Netherlands	Croatia	Total
1	"Alo"			10			4		14
2	"Ako mi se vratiš"	2	6	4	6	2	6	1	27
3	"Lisja esenski"	6		7	7	12	10	12	54
4	"Se plašam"					1		3	4
5	"Sever-Jug"		1						1
6	"Da ne te sakam"	8	12	2	4	10	8	4	48
7	"Srce čuva spomeni"	3		3					6
8	"Sonce niz oblaci"								0
9	"Ni Lj od ljubovta"		10					2	12
10	"Mig bez tebe"				1				1
11	"Marija"	10		6			1	7	24
12	"Vo tvojot svet"	1	8		3	7	2		21
13	"Zaljuben"	5	5		5				15
14	"Brod što tone"	12	7	8	12	8	12	10	69
15	"Sakam da letam"	4	4	5	8	4	7		32
16	"Znam"			12	10	3	5	8	38
17	"Edna edinstvena"		3				3		6
18	"Samo za tebe"								0
19	"Bluz za..."		2	1	2	6		5	16
20	"Se što ti vetiv"	7				5		6	18

International Jury Members
Country	Jury members
Austria	Nadine Beiler – singer, represented Austria in the Eurovision Song Contest 2011; Alexander Kahr – composer, composed the 2002 and 2013 Austrian entries; Ralf Strobl – Eurovision expert, music consultant; Thomas Rabitsch – keyboardist and record producer; Dorothee Badent – producer, produced Austria's winning Eurovision 2014 song "Rise Like a Phoenix"
Azerbaijan	Aziz Aliyev – İTV editor; Yalchin Verdiyev – movie director; Sabuhi Mammadov – sound director; Azad Ibrahimov – director of the department of international relations at İTV; Fuad Musazade – acting Head of the Azerbaijani delegation at the Eurovision Song Contest
Bulgaria	Angel Zaberski – composer; Joanna Dragneva – singer, lead singer of Deep Zone Project which represented Bulgaria in Eurovision 2008; Krasimir Kurtev – musician; Milka Miteva – director of the music school "Lubomir Pipkov"; Roberta Ganova – singer
Croatia	Aleksandar Kostadinov – Head of the Croatian delegation at the Eurovision Song Contest; Ivan Horvat – member of OGAE Croatia; Tihomir Preradović – composer and producer; Željen Klašterka – manager of the music production for HTV, producer and composer; Željko Mesar – Head of the music programming sector for HTV
Netherlands	Cornald Maas – Eurovision expert and commentator; Daniël Dekker – director of the national radio for AVROTROS; Emilie Sickinghe – Head of the Dutch delegation at the Eurovision Song Contest; Joost Strootman – producer at the national radio for AVROTROS; Rebecca van 't Velt – Head of Press for the Dutch delegation at the Eurovision Song Contest
Romania	Alex Revenco – journalist for Jurnalul Național; Nicoleta Alexandru – singer, represented Romania in Eurovision 2003; Andrei Tudor – composer, music professor; Mihai "Bobby" Stoica – music producer, composer; Alexandra Cepraga – musicologist, sound engineer
Turkey	Tuğberk Evren – music director at TRT; Elif Gökalp – director of the musical sector of Radio Ankara; Erhan Konuk – producer; Bahar Dingil – director of productions and transmissions at TRT; Kenan Özdemir – musician and member of the choir for Radio Ankara

=== Controversy ===
It was revealed a day after Skopje Fest 2014 that over 2,500 phone cards were seized by the Macedonian police which were investigating a possible voting fraud where 14 people were identified to have been hired to use the previously distributed cards during the voting of the competition. It was later claimed that composer of Viktorija Loba's song, Jovan Jovanov, was part of the four-member group responsible for the case.

=== Preparation ===
Following Skopje Fest 2014, Daniel Kajmakoski stated in an interview with ESCplus that he was highly considering to perform "Lisja esenski" in English at the Eurovision Song Contest. It was later confirmed that the song would be performed in English as "Autumn Leaves" and that a new three-minute version was recorded in early 2015. Kajmakovski worked with Macedonian producer Robert Bilbilov to create the final English version of the song, which was presented to the public through the release of the official music video via the official Eurovision Song Contest's YouTube channel.

=== Promotion ===
Daniel Kajmakoski made several appearances across Europe to specifically promote "Autumn Leaves" as the Macedonian Eurovision entry. On 1 February, Kajmakoski performed the Macedonian and Serbian versions of "Autumn Leaves" during the RTS1 programme Nedeljno popodne in Serbia. On 13 April, Kajmakoski took part in promotional activities in Tirana, Albania where he gave interviews for media outlets and appeared during talk show programmes to discuss his Eurovision participation. On 15 April, Kajmakoski performed during a preview event which was organised by OGAE Serbia and held at the UŠĆE Shopping Centre in Belgrade, Serbia. On 18 April, Kajmakoski performed during the Eurovision in Concert event which was held at the Melkweg venue in Amsterdam, Netherlands and hosted by Cornald Maas and Edsilia Rombley. On 24 April, Kajmakoski performed during the Eurovision Pre-Party, which was held at the Place de Paris Korston Concert Hall in Moscow, Russia. A farewell event was held in Skopje on 9 May before Daniel Kajmakoski departed to Vienna for the contest.

== At Eurovision ==
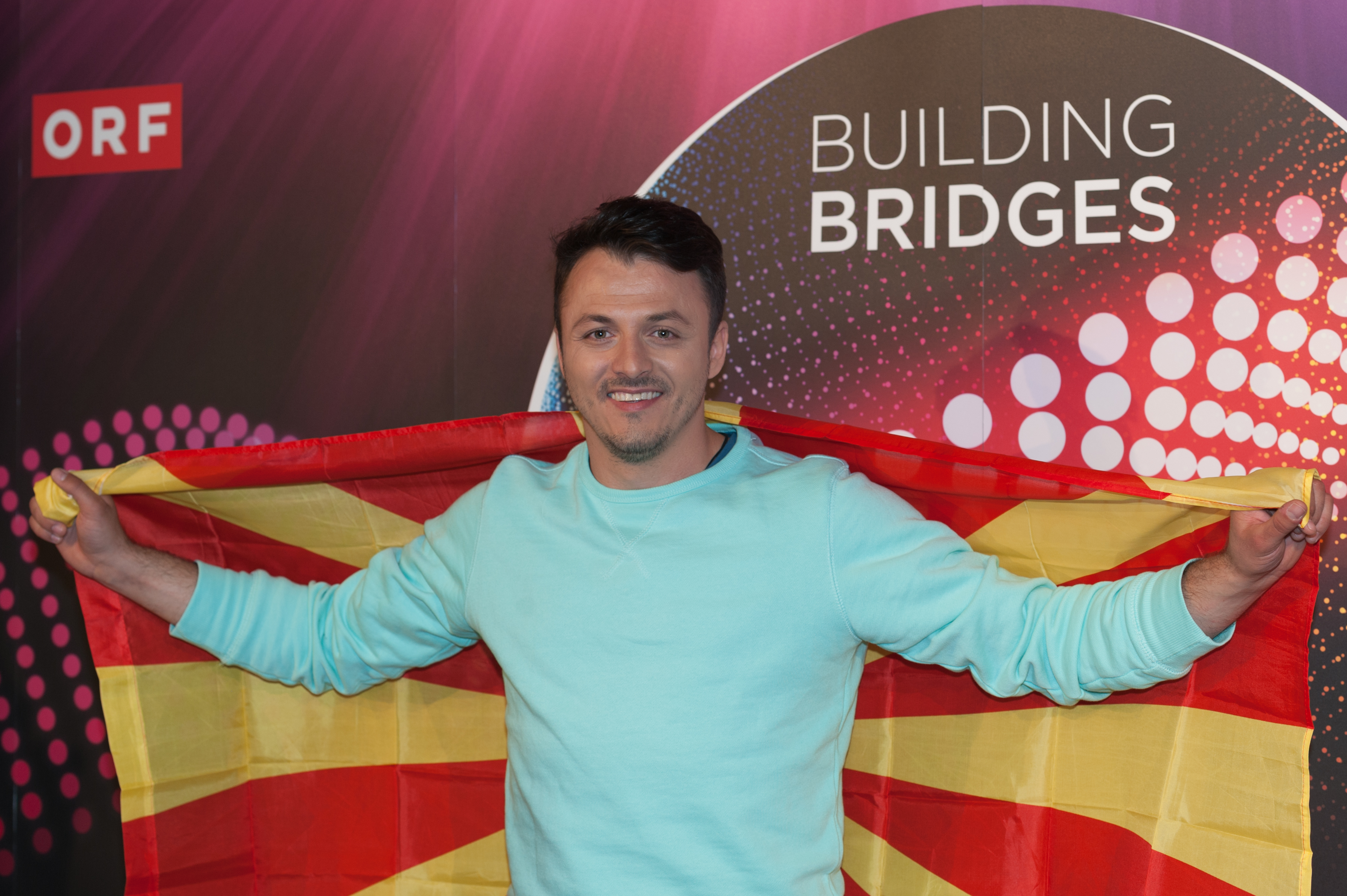
Daniel Kajmakoski during a press meet and greet

According to Eurovision rules, all nations with the exceptions of the host country and the "Big Five" (France, Germany, Italy, Spain and the United Kingdom) are required to qualify from one of two semi-finals in order to compete for the final; the top ten countries from each semi-final progress to the final. In the 2015 contest, Australia also competed directly in the final as an invited guest nation. The European Broadcasting Union (EBU) split up the competing countries into five different pots based on voting patterns from previous contests, with countries with favourable voting histories put into the same pot. On 26 January 2015, a special allocation draw was held which placed each country into one of the two semi-finals, as well as which half of the show they would perform in. Macedonia was placed into the first semi-final, to be held on 19 May 2015, and was scheduled to perform in the first half of the show.

Once all the competing songs for the 2015 contest had been released, the running order for the semi-finals was decided by the shows' producers rather than through another draw, so that similar songs were not placed next to each other. Macedonia was set to perform in position 8, following the entry from Estonia and before the entry from Serbia.

The two semi-finals and final were broadcast in Macedonia on MRT 1, MRT Sat and Radio Skopje with commentary by Karolina Petkovska. MRT also broadcast the three shows on MRT 2 and MRT 2 Sat with commentary in the Albanian language. The Macedonian spokesperson, who announced the Macedonian votes during the final, was Marko Mark.

=== Semi-final ===
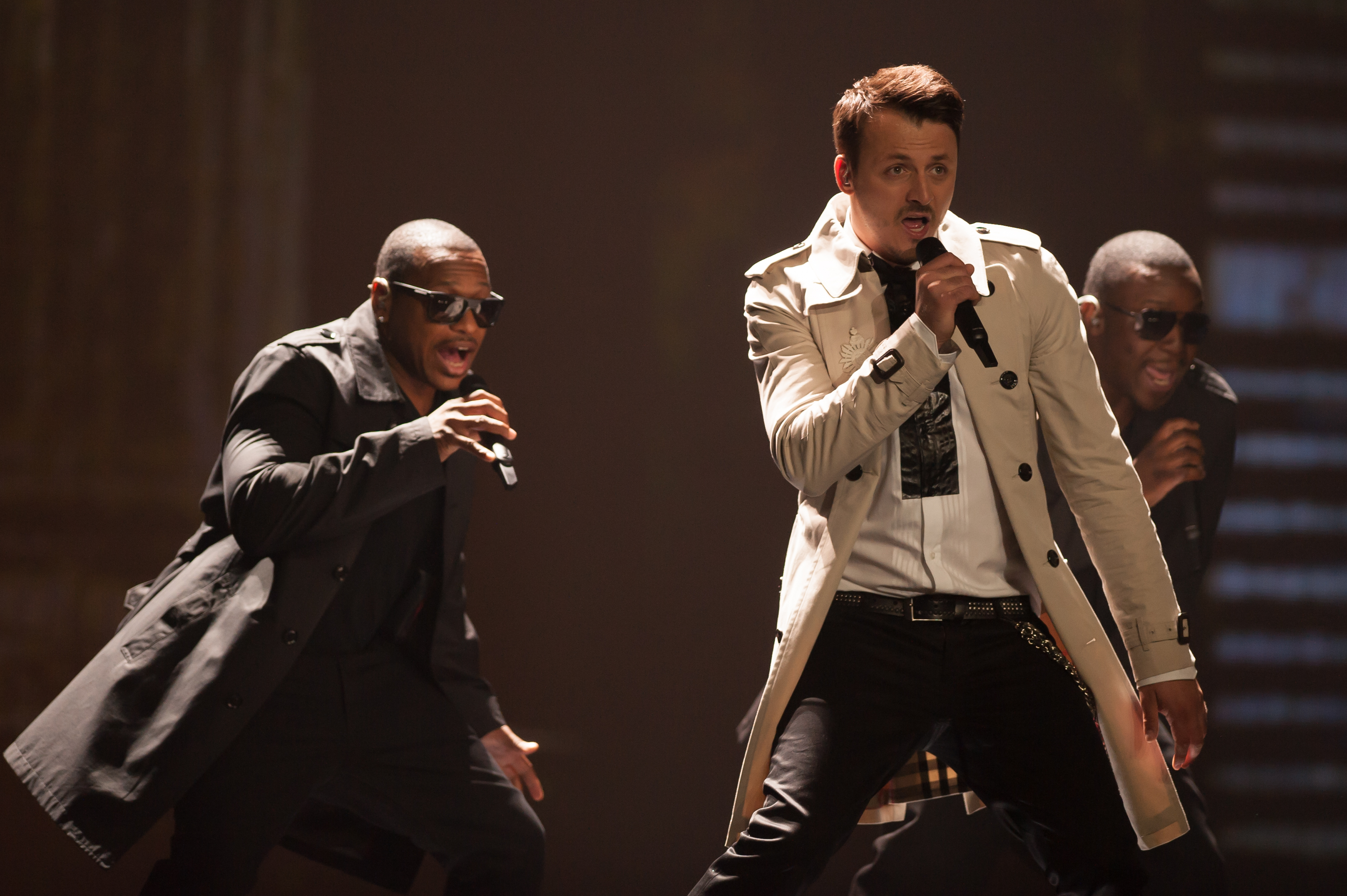
Daniel Kajmakoski during a rehearsal before the first semi-final

Daniel Kajmakoski took part in technical rehearsals on 11 and 15 May, followed by dress rehearsals on 18 and 19 May. This included the jury show on 11 May where the professional juries of each country watched and voted on the competing entries.

The Macedonian performance featured Daniel Kajmakoski performing choreographed movements in a trench coat together with three backing vocalists in black trench coats. The stage colours were gold, red and dark blue with the background LED screens displaying medieval ruins, flowing autumn leaves and a sky that transitioned from grey to yellow and red colours. The three backing vocalists that joined Daniel Kajmakoski on stage were members of the American R&B group Blackstreet (MERJ): Mark Middleton, Eric Williams and Jeremy Hanna.

At the end of the show, Macedonia was not announced among the top 10 entries in the first semi-final and therefore failed to qualify to compete in the final. It was later revealed that Macedonia placed fifteenth in the semi-final, receiving a total of 28 points.

=== Voting ===
Voting during the three shows consisted of 50 percent public televoting and 50 percent from a jury deliberation. The jury consisted of five music industry professionals who were citizens of the country they represent, with their names published before the contest to ensure transparency. This jury was asked to judge each contestant based on: vocal capacity; the stage performance; the song's composition and originality; and the overall impression by the act. In addition, no member of a national jury could be related in any way to any of the competing acts in such a way that they cannot vote impartially and independently. The individual rankings of each jury member were released shortly after the grand final.

Following the release of the full split voting by the EBU after the conclusion of the competition, it was revealed that Macedonia had placed sixteenth (last) with the public televote and fifteenth with the jury vote in the first semi-final. In the public vote, Macedonia scored 22 points, while in the jury vote, Macedonia scored 42 points. In addition, the EBU announced that it had disqualified the Macedonian jury results in the final due to irregularities. The exclusion of the votes was decided upon in consultation with the contest's independent voting observer, PricewaterhouseCoopers, and based upon the decision of the Executive Supervisor and the Chairman of the Reference Group. Macedonia's votes in the final were produced solely by the public televote.

Below is a breakdown of points awarded to Macedonia and awarded by Macedonia in the first semi-final and grand final of the contest, and the breakdown of the jury voting and televoting conducted during the two shows:

==== Points awarded to Macedonia ====
Points awarded to Macedonia (Semi-final 1)
Score	Country
12 points	Serbia
10 points	Albania
8 points	
7 points	
6 points	
5 points	
4 points	
3 points	Australia
2 points	Estonia
1 point	Moldova

==== Points awarded by Macedonia ====
Points awarded by Macedonia (Semi-final 1)
Score	Country
12 points	Serbia
10 points	Albania
8 points	Russia
7 points	Armenia
6 points	Belgium
5 points	Moldova
4 points	Greece
3 points	Georgia
2 points	Estonia
1 point	Netherlands

Points awarded by Macedonia (Final)
Score	Country
12 points	Albania
10 points	Serbia
8 points	Slovenia
7 points	Italy
6 points	Russia
5 points	Sweden
4 points	Montenegro
3 points	Armenia
2 points	Estonia
1 point	Belgium

==== Detailed voting results ====
The following members comprised the Macedonian jury:

- Antonio Dimitrievski (jury chairperson) – music producer
- Ana Kostadinovska – music teacher, backing vocal
- Aleksandar Belov – singer
- Sara Nikolovska – professional musician
- Andrijana Jovanovska – lyric writer, music journalist

Detailed voting results from Macedonia (Semi-final 1)
R/O	Country	A. Dimitrievski	A. Kostadinovska	A. Belov	S. Nikolovska	A. Jovanovska	Jury Rank	Televote Rank	Combined Rank	Points
01	Moldova	11	8	10	7	7	9	4	6	5
02	Armenia	13	3	3	5	9	5	5	4	7
03	Belgium	4	2	5	2	2	2	10	5	6
04	Netherlands	8	13	11	6	8	11	11	10	1
05	Finland	14	14	15	15	15	15	9	13	
06	Greece	3	5	7	14	10	6	7	7	4
07	Estonia	10	15	9	13	11	13	6	9	2
08	Macedonia									
09	Serbia	1	1	1	1	1	1	2	1	12
10	Hungary	15	12	14	12	14	14	13	15	
11	Belarus	9	9	8	10	6	7	15	12	
12	Russia	2	4	2	4	3	3	3	3	8
13	Denmark	12	10	4	11	13	12	14	14	
14	Albania	7	6	6	3	4	4	1	2	10
15	Romania	6	7	13	8	12	10	12	11	
16	Georgia	5	11	12	9	5	8	8	8	3

Detailed voting results from Macedonia (Final)
R/O	Country	Televote Rank	Points
01	Slovenia	3	8
02	France	23	
03	Israel	14	
04	Estonia	9	2
05	United Kingdom	24	
06	Armenia	8	3
07	Lithuania	22	
08	Serbia	2	10
09	Norway	21	
10	Sweden	6	5
11	Cyprus	26	
12	Australia	11	
13	Belgium	10	1
14	Austria	20	
15	Greece	12	
16	Montenegro	7	4
17	Germany	17	
18	Poland	25	
19	Latvia	19	
20	Romania	15	
21	Spain	16	
22	Hungary	27	
23	Georgia	18	
24	Azerbaijan	13	
25	Russia	5	6
26	Albania	1	12
27	Italy	4	7
