= Malta in the Junior Eurovision Song Contest 2003 =

- Junior Eurovision Song Contest 2003
- Participating broadcaster: Public Broadcasting Services (PBS)
- Country: Malta
- Selection process: Malta’s selection for the Junior Eurovision Song Contest 2003
- Selection date: 6 September 2003

Competing entry
- Song: "Like a Star"
- Artist: Sarah Harrison
- Songwriter: Sarah Harrison

Placement
- Final result: 7th, 56 points

Participation chronology

Malta was represented at the Junior Eurovision Song Contest 2003 with the song "Like a Star", written and performed by Sarah Harrison. The Maltese participating broadcaster, Public Broadcasting Services (PBS), selected its entry for the contest through a national final. This was the first-ever entry from Malta in the Junior Eurovision Song Contest.

== Before Junior Eurovision ==
=== Malta’s selection for the Junior Eurovision Song Contest 2003 ===
Public Broadcasting Services (PBS) opened a submission window on 2 May 2003 and closed it on 15 July 2003. 49 entries were received.

The preliminary selection took place on 1 August 2003 with the finalists being chosen by a 6-member jury appointed by Maltasong. The finalists were announced on 8 August 2003.

The final was held on 6 September 2003 at the Mediterranean Conference Centre in Valletta and was broadcast live on TVM at 20:30 CEST. The show was hosted by Annalise Ellul. The results were decided by jury and televoting. Guest performers included Bradley McIntosh, L13, Lyndze B, Malta’s Latin America dance champions, Mitchel and Jessica, Ray Mangion’s Junior Choir Act React, Sophie and Yasmin, Steve Cole, and The Junior YADA Dance Company.

Final – 6 September 2003
R/O	Artist	Song	Songwriter(s)	Points	Place
1	Christabelle Borg	"Smile"	Louanne M. Caruana	105	3
2	Marilena Gauci	"This Is Our Heaven"	Loredana Paola Caruana; Marilena Gauci	90	5
3	Brooke Borg and Brendan Borg	"Like a Butterfly"	Brooke Borg; Brendan Borg	102	4
4	Decoda Buttigieg	"Little Angel"	Decoda Buttigieg	37	8
5	Kylie Coleiro	"Share the Joy"	Kylie Coleiro	25	9
6	Ylenia Caruana	"In Love Unite"	Ylenia Caruana	146	2
7	Klinsmann Coleiro	"Where There's a Will"	Kylie Coleiro	74	6
8	Christine Barbara	"My Dear Imaginary Friend"	Christine Barbara	49	7
9	Sarah Harrison	"Like a Star"	Sarah Harrison	170	1
10	Leanne Ellul	"Prayer for Peace"	Leanne Ellul	22	10

== At Junior Eurovision ==
At the running order draw, Malta were drawn to perform sixteenth on 15 November 2003, following Sweden and preceding the Netherlands

=== Voting ===
Points awarded to Malta
Score	Country
12 points	
10 points	Denmark United Kingdom
8 points	
7 points	Spain
6 points	
5 points	Netherlands
4 points	Belarus; Poland; Romania
3 points	Croatia; Cyprus
2 points	Greece; Sweden
1 point	Belgium; Latvia

Points awarded by Malta
Score	Country
12 points	United Kingdom
10 points	Spain
8 points	Croatia
7 points	Denmark
6 points	Belarus
5 points	Romania
4 points	Belgium
3 points	Latvia
2 points	Macedonia
1 point	Sweden
