= Poland in the Junior Eurovision Song Contest 2003 =

- Junior Eurovision Song Contest 2003
- Participating broadcaster: Telewizja Polska (TVP)
- Country: Poland
- Selection process: Polski Finał Konkursu Piosenki Eurowizji dla Dzieci 2003
- Selection date: 28 September 2003

Competing entry
- Song: "Coś mnie nosi"
- Artist: Kasia Żurawik
- Songwriter: Katarzyna Żurawik

Placement
- Final result: 16th, 3 points

Participation chronology

Poland was represented at the Junior Eurovision Song Contest 2003 with the song "Coś mnie nosi", written and performed by Kasia Żurawik. The Polish participating broadcaster, Telewizja Polska (TVP), organised the national final Polski Finał Konkursu Piosenki Eurowizji dla Dzieci 2003 to select its entry for the contest. This was the first-ever entry from Poland in the Junior Eurovision Song Contest.

== Before Junior Eurovision ==
=== Polski Finał Konkursu Piosenki Eurowizji dla Dzieci 2003 ===
Telewizja Polska (TVP) opened the submission window for the national final from 25 July until 10 September 2003. From the received submissions, a committee chose 30 participants to the internal eliminations on 21 September 2003 in TVP Studios. From the internal eliminations, 13 finalists were chosen to compete in the final.

The final was held on 28 September 2003 in TVP Studios and broadcast on TVP2. It was hosted by Jarosław Kulczycki. The results were chosen by only televoting. In the event of a technical failure preventing televoting, a backup jury would be used that consisted of Irena Santor, Ernest Bryll, Janusz Tylman, Zygmunt Kukla, Wojciech Jagielski, Joszko Broda, Krzysztof Antkowiak, Georgina Tarasiuk, Aleksander Pałac and Robert Kamyk. Leszcze was a guest performer in the final.

Final – 28 September 2003
R/O	Artist	Song
1	Agata Korwin	"Dziecko na pokaz"
2	Justyna Kosela	"Wakacyjna niespodzianka"
3	Agata Stodolna	"Kropeleczka"
4	Zuzanna Madejska	"Ty"
5	Magdalena Ćwiklińska	"Bluesowe zwierzaki"
6	Stonoga	"Trzepak show"
7	Kasper Zborowski-Weychman	"Lato"
8	Sebastian Plewiński	"Jeśli kochasz"
9	Wigor	"Wrzuć na luz"
10	Marta Moszczyńska	"W obronie marzeń"
11	Marina Łuczenko	"Sen"
12	Dominika Rydz	"Moj świat"
13	Katarzyna Żurawik	"Coś mnie nosi"

== At Junior Eurovision ==
At the running order draw, Poland were drawn to perform seventh on 15 November 2003, following Macedonia and preceding Norway.

=== Voting ===
Points awarded to Poland
Score	Country
12 points	
10 points	
8 points	
7 points	
6 points	
5 points	
4 points	
3 points	Belarus
2 points	
1 point	

Points awarded by Poland
Score	Country
12 points	Belarus
10 points	Croatia
8 points	Spain
7 points	United Kingdom
6 points	Belgium
5 points	Denmark
4 points	Malta
3 points	Latvia
2 points	Romania
1 point	Greece
