= Netherlands in the Junior Eurovision Song Contest 2003 =

- Junior Eurovision Song Contest 2003
- Participating broadcaster: Algemene Vereniging Radio Omroep (AVRO)
- Country: Netherlands
- Selection process: Junior Songfestival 2003
- Selection date: 20 September 2003

Competing entry
- Song: "Mijn ogen zeggen alles"
- Artist: Roel
- Songwriter: Roel Felius

Placement
- Final result: 11th, 23 points

Participation chronology

The Netherlands was represented at the Junior Eurovision Song Contest 2003 with the song "Mijn ogen zeggen alles" written and performed by Roel Felius. The Dutch participating broadcaster, Algemene Vereniging Radio Omroep (AVRO), selected its entry for the contest through a national final. This was the first-ever entry from the Netherlands in the Junior Eurovision Song Contest.

== Before Junior Eurovision ==
=== Junior Eurovisie Songfestival Nationale Finale 2003 ===
Algemene Vereniging Radio Omroep (AVRO) received 300 entries. The auditions were held on 15 June 2003. From the auditions, 11 entries were selected to compete in the internal semi-final on 12 September 2003, where the 9 finalists were selected. The 9 finalists were revealed on 15 September 2003.

The final was held on 20 September 2003 in Pepsi Stage, Amsterdam. The final was hosted by Angela Groothuizen. The results were decided by 50% jury and 50% televoting. The jury consisted of Bastiaan Ragas, Birgit Schuurman, Gijs Staverman, Jamai Loman and Sylvana Simons. The final had an average of 764,000 viewers with a 14% share.

Final – 20 September 2003
R/O	Artist	Song	Jury	Televote	Total	Place
1	Aisa	“Duizend dromen”	12	11	23	8
2	Claire and Manouk	“Verliefd op een jongen”	14	6	20	9
3	Tom	“Dansen in de lucht”	46	38	84	3
4	Jasmine	“Mijn radio”	25	19	44	5
5	Hedwig	“Verliefd”	35	22	57	4
6	Aylin and Remi	“Weet waraan je begint”	22	12	34	6
7	Valerie	“Leef je droom”	41	55	96	2
8	Roel	“Mijn ogen zeggen alles”	52	66	118	1
9	Tessa and Marloes	“Ik had het bijna gevraagd”	8	21	29	7

Detailed Jury Votes
R/O	Song	B. Ragas	J. Loman	G. Staverman	S. Simons	B. Schuurman	Total
1	“Duizend dromen”	3	2	2	2	3	12
2	“Verliefd op een jongen”	2	4	3	3	2	14
3	“Dansen in de lucht”	10	10	6	8	12	46
4	“Mijn radio”	1	5	10	4	5	25
5	“Verliefd”	8	6	8	5	8	35
6	“Weet waraan je begint”	5	3	4	6	4	22
7	“Leef je droom”	6	12	5	12	6	41
8	“Mijn ogen zeggen alles”	12	8	12	10	10	52
9	“Ik had het bijna gevraagd”	4	1	1	1	1	8

== At Junior Eurovision ==
At the running order draw, the Netherlands were drawn to perform sixteenth on 15 November 2003, following Malta.

=== Voting ===
Points awarded to the Netherlands
Score	Country
12 points	Belgium
10 points	
8 points	
7 points	
6 points	
5 points	
4 points	Spain
3 points	
2 points	Denmark; Romania; United Kingdom
1 point	Greece

Points awarded by the Netherlands
Score	Country
12 points	Belgium
10 points	Croatia
8 points	United Kingdom
7 points	Spain
6 points	Latvia
5 points	Malta
4 points	Macedonia
3 points	Belarus
2 points	Denmark
1 point	Greece
