= Romania in the Junior Eurovision Song Contest 2003 =

- Junior Eurovision Song Contest 2003
- Participating broadcaster: Televiziunea Română (TVR)
- Country: Romania
- Selection process: National final
- Selection date: 6 October 2003

Competing entry
- Song: "Tobele sunt viața mea"
- Artist: Bubu
- Songwriter: Bubu Cernea

Placement
- Final result: 10th, 35 points

Participation chronology

Romania was represented at the Junior Eurovision Song Contest 2003 with the song "Tobele sunt viața mea", written and performed by Bubu Cernea. The Romanian participating broadcaster, Televiziunea Română (TVR), selected its entry for the contest through a national final. This was the first-ever entry from Romania in the Junior Eurovision Song Contest.

== Before Junior Eurovision ==
=== National final ===
From the submission window opened by Televiziunea Română (TVR), seventeen entries were received which nine of them were disqualified. The eight entries took place in the first stage of the national final on 18 September 2003 in TVR studios. Three finalists were selected from the stage and were announced on 24 September 2003.

The final was held on 6 October 2003. The results were decided by only jury.

Final – 6 October 2003
Artist	Song	Result
Bubu	"Muzica"	1
Flavia Dan	"Vreau sa cant"	—N/a
Ioana Neaga	"Lasa-ma sa visez"	—N/a

Jury Group Members
Jury	Members
Children	Alina Sorescu; Beatrice Soare; Daniel Mihaly Pop; Diana Dedita; Sabrina Manoliu
Composers	Cornel Fugaru; George Natsis; Viorel Gravilă
Press	Alex Revenco; Anca Nicoleanu; Diana Popescu; Dragos Vasile; Florin Ghioca
Radio	Andrei Partoș; Eugen Rusu; Răzvan Popescu
TVR	Dan Manoliu; Cezara Dorobantu-Radulescu; Liviu Elekes

=== Preparations ===
The song title for the song "Muzica" by Bubu was later changed to "Tobele sunt viața mea".

== At Junior Eurovision ==
At the running order draw, Romania were drawn to perform tenth on 15 November 2003, following Spain and preceding Belgium.

=== Voting ===
Points awarded to Romania
Score	Country
12 points	
10 points	
8 points	
7 points	
6 points	Belgium; Spain
5 points	Cyprus; Macedonia; Malta
4 points	Greece
3 points	
2 points	Latvia; Poland
1 point	

Points awarded by Romania
Score	Country
12 points	Croatia
10 points	United Kingdom
8 points	Spain
7 points	Belarus
6 points	Denmark
5 points	Greece
4 points	Malta
3 points	Belgium
2 points	Netherlands
1 point	Latvia
