= Sarah Harrison (singer) =

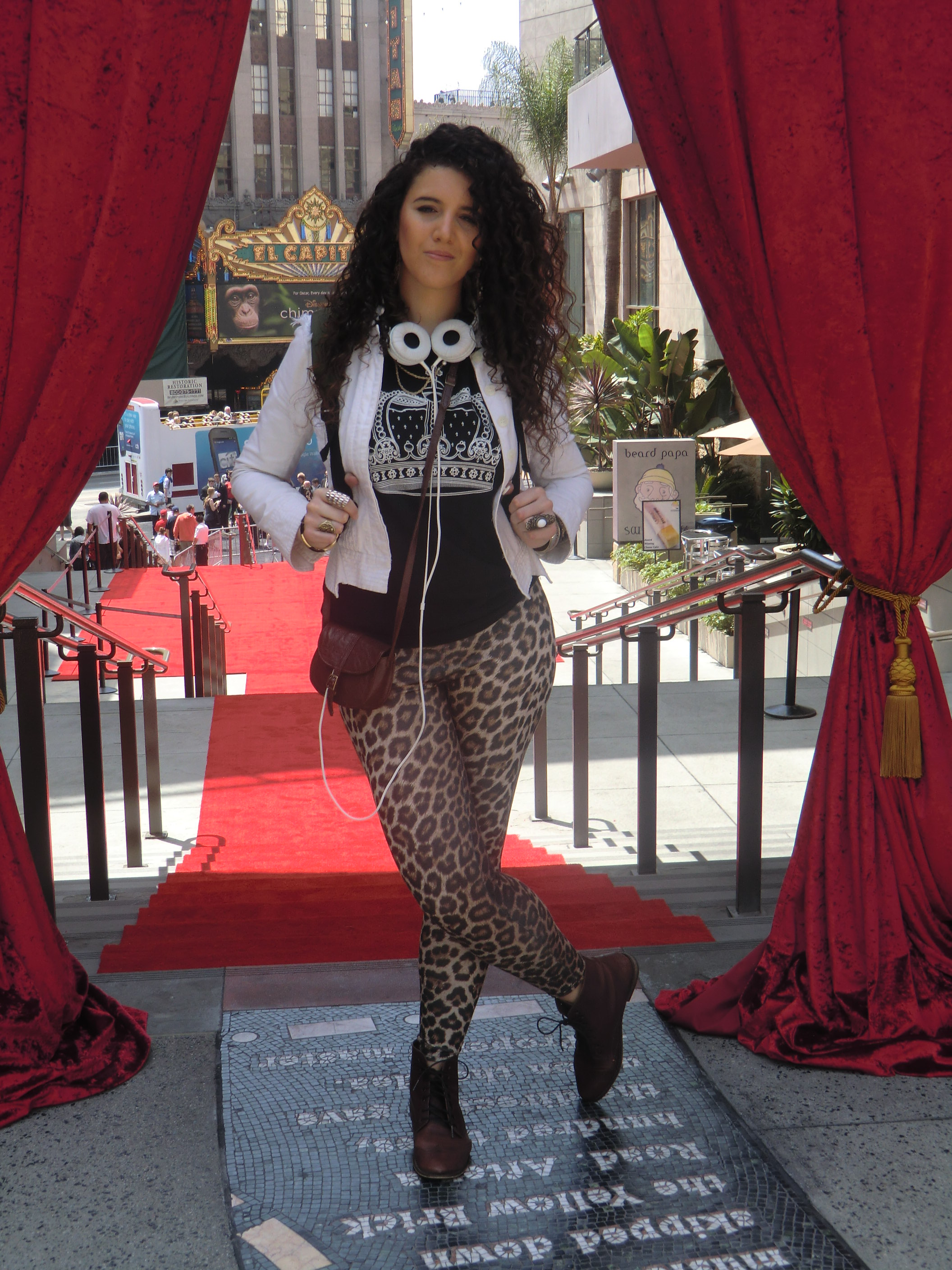

Background information
- Born: 1990 (age 35–36); Malta
- Origin: London, England, UK
- Genres: Hip hop, R&B, pop
- Occupations: Singer, songwriter, DJ, music producer, actress
- Instruments: Vocals, Piano
- Website: imsarahharrison.com

Sarah Harrison (born 1990), also known by her stage name LadyInTheTrap (LITT), is an English-Maltese DJ and singer.

== Early life ==
Born in Malta, Harrison began her career as a child, hosting a children's television show on ONE TV in Malta. At the age of 12, she moved to London, where she began attending the Sylvia Young Theatre School.

At the age of 13, she represented Malta at the inaugural Junior Eurovision Song Contest in Copenhagen, Denmark. She performed the self-written song "Like a Star", which placed 7th.

In 2006, she featured as one of the subjects of the Channel 4 documentary series My Crazy Life. An episode in the series followed Harrison's quest for fame and her family's sacrifices to support her. She later attended Laine Theatre Arts College.

She appeared as an extra in two Harry Potter films and was part of an ensemble that recorded sessions at Abbey Road studios for the Disney and Walden Media film version of CS Lewis's The Lion, the Witch and the Wardrobe.

== Radio ==
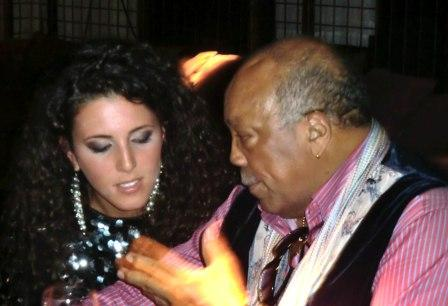
Harrison and Quincy Jones

Her interest in producing was boosted by a meeting with Quincy Jones. Her first break came in early 2012, after she was contacted by Snoop Dogg after he heard her tracks on SoundCloud.

She became host of a self-titled weekly radio show, The Sarah Harrison Show, on The Beat London 103.6 FM. Harrison made trips to the US to host DJ for the International Music Conference in Atlanta.

Alongside a Nike Town residency, she has opened for The Game and Ciara, and been a part of the Wireless line-up.

Awards and achievements
Preceded by none	Malta in the Junior Eurovision Song Contest; 2003	Succeeded by Young Talent Team with "Power of a Song"
