= Hjärnkontoret =

- Country of origin: Sweden
- Original language: Swedish

Original release
- Network: SVT
- Release: 10 January 1995

Hjärnkontoret ("the brain office") is a Swedish children's science programme broadcast by SVT since 10 January 1995 (then hosted by Fredrik Berling). Today, it's hosted by Benjamin "Beppe" Singer and its earlier hosts include DJ Webster, Frida Nilsson, Henry Chu, Victoria Dyring and Fredrik Berling.

== Awards ==
- 2002 – Kunskapspriset
- 2006 – Kristallen
- 2011 – Årets folkbildare
