= United Kingdom in the Junior Eurovision Song Contest 2003 =

- Junior Eurovision Song Contest 2003
- Participating broadcaster: ITV
- Country: United Kingdom
- Selection process: Junior Eurovision Song Contest: The British Final
- Selection date: 6 September 2003

Competing entry
- Song: "My Song for the World"
- Artist: Tom Morley
- Songwriter: Tom Morley

Placement
- Final result: 3rd, 118 points

Participation chronology

The United Kingdom was represented at the Junior Eurovision Song Contest 2003 with the song "My Song for the World", written and performed by Tom Morley. The British participating broadcaster, ITV, organised a national final to select its entry for the contest. This was the first-ever entry from the United Kingdom in the Junior Eurovision Song Contest.

Tom Morley performed twelfth in the running order, following the entry from Belgium and preceding the entry from Denmark. The United Kingdom finished in third position with 118 points.

== Before Junior Eurovision ==
=== Junior Eurovision Song Contest 2003: The British Final ===
The final was held on 6 September 2003 at Carlton Studios in Nottingham, and was broadcast on ITV1. The show was presented by Mark Durden-Smith and Tara Palmer-Tomkinson, and regional televoting groups selected the winner from the eight competing acts.

Final – 6 September 2003
R/O	Artist	Song	Points	Place
1	Feature 5	"Slumberland"	35	4
2	Jack Brown	"Back to Love"	12	7
3	Ellis De Bie	"I Have a Feeling"	38	3
4	Starrlight	"Gonna Be Fine"	10	8
5	Sasha Stevens	"Little Children"	29	5
6	Mr Cheerful	"Winter's Nearly Gone"	23	6
7	Tom Morley	"My Song for the World"	64	1
8	UZLOT	"Please Don't Cry"	62	2

Detailed Regional Televoting Results
R/O	Song	Regional televoting groups							Total
R/O	Song	A	B	C	D	E	F	G	Total
1	"Slumberland"	6	5	5	5	5	3	6	35
2	"Back to Love"	2	1	1	3	2	1	2	12
3	"I Have a Feeling"	5	6	4	6	6	6	5	38
4	"Gonna Be Fine"	1	2	2	1	1	2	1	10
5	"Little Children"	3	4	6	4	4	4	4	29
6	"Winter's Nearly Gone"	4	3	3	2	3	5	3	23
7	"My Song for the World"	8	10	8	10	10	8	10	64
8	"Please Don't Cry"	10	8	10	8	8	10	8	62

ITV1 Television Regions
- A: HTV West, Carlton Central, Carlton Westcountry
- B: Scottish, Grampian
- C: HTV Wales
- D: Tyne Tees, Yorkshire
- E: Ulster
- F: LWT, Meridian, Carlton, Anglia, Channel
- G: Granada, Border
Spokesperson by regional group
- A: Leah Charles
- B: Ashley Mulhern
- C: Sarah Elgin
- D: James McCourt
- E: Laura Dorothy
- F: Giles Vickers Jones
- G: Caroline Hacking

== At Junior Eurovision ==
On the night of the contest, held in Copenhagen, Denmark, Tom Morley performed 12th in the running order of the contest, following Belgium and preceding Denmark. At the close of the voting Morley has received 118 points, placing 3rd of the 16 competing entries, beaten by Spain and winners' Croatia.

In the United Kingdom, the show was televised on ITV1 with commentary by national final hosts Durden-Smith and Palmer-Tomkinson. The British spokesperson, who announced the British votes during the final, was national finalist Sasha Stevens. The live broadcast averaged 5 million viewers.

=== Voting ===
Points awarded to the United Kingdom
Score	Country
12 points	Belarus; Denmark; Malta
10 points	Romania; Spain; Sweden
8 points	Netherlands
7 points	Cyprus; Greece; Latvia; Poland
6 points	
5 points	Norway
4 points	Belgium; Croatia
3 points	Macedonia
2 points	
1 point	

Points awarded by the United Kingdom
Score	Country
12 points	Spain
10 points	Malta
8 points	Croatia
7 points	Greece
6 points	Belgium
5 points	Belarus
4 points	Denmark
3 points	Cyprus
2 points	Netherlands
1 point	Latvia
