= Croatia in the Junior Eurovision Song Contest 2003 =

- Junior Eurovision Song Contest 2003
- Participating broadcaster: Hrvatska radiotelevizija (HRT)
- Country: Croatia
- Selection process: 1. Izbor za Dječju Pjesmu Eurovizije 2003
- Selection date: 7 July 2003

Competing entry
- Song: "Ti Si Moja Prva Ljubav"
- Artist: Dino Jelusić
- Songwriter: Dino Jelusić

Placement
- Final result: 1st, 134 points

Participation chronology

Croatia was represented at the Junior Eurovision Song Contest 2003 with the song "Ti Si Moja Prva Ljubav", written and performed by Dino Jelusić. The Croatian participating broadcaster, Hrvatska radiotelevizija (HRT), organised a national final to select its entry for the contest. This was the first-ever entry from Croatia in the Junior Eurovision Song Contest and the first-ever winner of the contest.

== Before Junior Eurovision ==
=== 1. Izbor za Dječju Pjesmu Eurovizije 2003 ===
1. Izbor za Dječju Pjesmu Eurovizije 2003 was the first edition of the national selection for the Junior Eurovision Song Contest organised by Hrvatska radiotelevizija (HRT) to select its entry for the Junior Eurovision Song Contest 2003.

==== Competing entries ====
Artists and composers were able to submit their entries to the broadcaster. An expert committee consisting of Alan Bjelinski, Rajko Dujmić, Boris Đurđević, Mladen Kušec, Marin Margitić, Ivana Plechinger and Maja Vučić selected ten artists and songs for the competition from the received submissions.

==== Final ====
The final took place on 7 July 2003 at the Tvornica Kulture in Zagreb, hosted by Iva Šulentić and Frano Domitrović, while all the competing songs were accompanied by a symphony orchestra. Guest performers included Claudia Beni, Ivana Kindl, Jacques Houdek and Nina Badrić. The winner was determined by a public televote. Only the winner was announced.

Final – 7 July 2003
R/O	Artist	Song
1	Luka Matošević	"Zašto si otišla"
2	Snježana-Ivana Pandl	"Treba mi vremena"
3	Mania	"Nedodirljiva"
4	Sara-Elena Menkovska	"Suzice"
5	Romana Brajša	"Ovisna"
6	Ivana Mrkonjić	"Anđele"
7	Kristina Jarić	"Ptica"
8	Hana Mašić	"Otkucaj srca tvog"
9	Marina Lijić	"Što je bilo"
10	Dino Jelušić	"Ti si moja prva ljubav"

== At Junior Eurovision ==
During the running order draw which both took place on 6 October 2003, Croatia was drawn to perform second, following Greece and preceding Cyprus. Dino Jelusić went on to win the contest with 134 points, receiving the maximum 12 points from 3 countries and receiving at least two points from every competing nation.

=== Voting ===
Points awarded to Croatia
Score	Country
12 points	Macedonia; Norway; Romania
10 points	Belarus; Greece; Netherlands; Poland
8 points	Belgium; Cyprus; Denmark; Latvia; Malta; Sweden; United Kingdom
7 points	
6 points	
5 points	
4 points	
3 points	
2 points	Spain
1 point	

Points awarded by Croatia
Score	Country
12 points	Belarus
10 points	Macedonia
8 points	Spain
7 points	Greece
6 points	Belgium
5 points	Latvia
4 points	United Kingdom
3 points	Malta
2 points	Denmark
1 point	Norway
