= Viktorija Loba =

Russian-Macedonian singer (born 1988)

Viktorija Loba Виктория Лоба
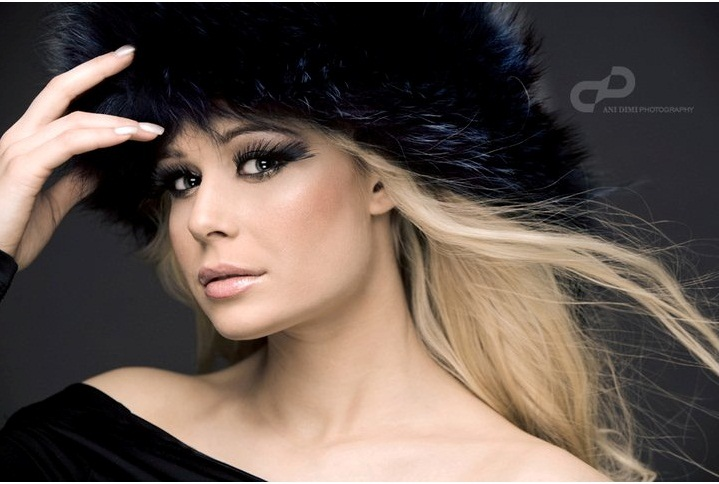
- Loba in 2016

Background information
- Also known as: Victoria Loba
- Born: 17 October 1988 (age 37); Taganrog, Russian SFSR, USSR
- Genres: Pop
- Occupation: Singer
- Instrument: Vocals
- Years active: 2003–present

Viktorija Loba (Macedonian: Викторија Лоба; Russian: Виктория Лоба, born 17 October 1988), is a Russian-Macedonian singer.

== Personal life and music career ==
Viktorija Loba was born in the city of Taganrog. When she was eight years old, Loba with her Russian family moved from Russia to North Macedonia. She has been present in the music scene and TV stations in Macedonia from an early age. When she was 15 years old, Loba represented Macedonia in the Junior Eurovision Song Contest 2003 in 2003, in Denmark, Copenhagen along with Marija Arsovska with the song Ti ne me poznavaš (You don't know me), landing in 12th place.

From 2008 to 2010 Loba was lead singer and lead vocal of the Macedonian group "Tumbao Salsa Band" that performs Brazilian, Portuguese and Cuban music.

In 2011, at Ohrid Fest, she won 2nd prize award in pop night, and 3rd award in the international evening, with the song "Nine things" ("Devet raboti").

In 2013, with the last hit "Summer Love" she climbed at the first place of Dutch top European list for young talent, Spinnin' Records, and remained on that position for long time. In 2014, at the international festival in Macedonia "Makfest" Loba won award for the Best performance with the song "Samo moj".

She attempted to represent Macedonia in the Eurovision Song Contest 2015 national final Skopje Fest 2014, with her song Edna edinstvena, which came in 7th place overall, despite being a fan favourite to win. Daniel Kajmakoski became the representative for Macedonia to the 2015 contest.

Awards and achievements
Preceded by none	North Macedonia in the Junior Eurovision Song Contest; 2003	Succeeded by Martina Siljanovska with "Zabava"
