= Denmark in the Junior Eurovision Song Contest 2003 =

- Junior Eurovision Song Contest 2003
- Participating broadcaster: Danmarks Radio (DR)
- Country: Denmark
- Selection process: MGP 2003
- Selection date: 3 May 2003

Competing entry
- Song: "Arabiens drøm"
- Artist: Anne Gadegaard
- Songwriter: Anne Gadegaard

Placement
- Final result: 5th, 93 points

Participation chronology

Denmark was represented at the Junior Eurovision Song Contest 2003 with the song "Arabiens drøm", written and performed by Anne Gadegaard. The Danish participating broadcaster, Danmarks Radio (DR), organised MGP 2003 to select its entry for the contest. This was the first-ever entry from Denmark in the Junior Eurovision Song Contest. In addition, DR was also the host broadcaster and staged the event at the Forum Copenhagen in Copenhagen.

== Before Junior Eurovision ==
In April 2000, Danmarks Radio (DR) launched a song contest for children aged 8 to 15. The idea drew the attention of Norway and Sweden in 2002, thus creating a pre-Scandinavian song contest entitled MGP Nordic. The European Broadcasting Union picked up on the format and launched a pan-European version in 2003, known as the Junior Eurovision Song Contest, with Denmark, Norway, and Sweden being three of the 16 participating countries.

=== MGP 2003 ===
DR held a national final to select the Danish national final for the first Junior Eurovision Song Contest, to be held in Denmark's capital Copenhagen. 10 songs competed in MGP 2003, held on 3 May and hosted by Camilla Ottesen and Gordon Kennedy.

The winner was chosen by 4 televoting regions and SMS voting in two rounds of voting - the first to select the top 5 and the second to select the winner. In the second round of voting, each televoting region awarded 4, 6, 8, 10 and 12 points to the remaining 5 songs, with the song receiving the most votes being the winner.

Final – 3 May 2003
R/O	Artist	Song	Result
1	Julie & Sofie	"Vi er venner"	Superfinalist
2	Eby	"Jeg er den som jeg er"	—N/a
3	B-Boys	"Vi gi'r den op"	Superfinalist
4	Linette	"Den eneste ene"	—N/a
5	Tue	"Ta' mig som jeg er"	Superfinalist
6	Shout	"Jeg tror, det kaldes kærlighed"	Superfinalist
7	Alexander	"Super sød sag"	—N/a
8	Nanna	"Er der nogen der ved"	—N/a
9	Sami	"Hvad hvis nu"	—N/a
10	Anne	"Arabiens drøm"	Superfinalist

Superfinal – 3 May 2003
R/O	Artist	Song	Jutland	Funen	Zealand, Lolland, Falster & Bornholm	Greater Copenhagen	SMS voting	Total	Place
1	Julie & Sofie	"Vi er venner"	4	4	4	4	4	20	5
2	B-Boys	"Vi gi'r den op"	8	10	8	10	8	44	3
3	Tue	"Ta' mig som jeg er"	6	6	6	6	6	30	4
4	Shout	"Jeg tror, det kaldes kærlighed"	10	8	10	8	10	46	2
5	Anne	"Arabiens drøm"	12	12	12	12	12	60	1

== At Junior Eurovision ==
On the night of the contest Anne performed 13th in the running order of the contest, following the United Kingdom and preceding Sweden. At the close of the voting she received 93 points, placing 5th of the 16 competing entries.

=== Voting ===
Points awarded to Denmark
Score	Country
12 points	Spain; Sweden
10 points	
8 points	Norway
7 points	Belgium; Macedonia; Malta
6 points	Greece; Latvia; Romania
5 points	Belarus; Poland
4 points	Cyprus; United Kingdom
3 points	
2 points	Croatia; Netherlands
1 point	

Points awarded by Denmark
Score	Country
12 points	United Kingdom
10 points	Malta
8 points	Croatia
7 points	Belgium
6 points	Spain
5 points	Sweden
4 points	Belarus
3 points	Norway
2 points	Netherlands
1 point	Greece
