= Junior Eurovision Song Contest 2003 =

International song competition for youth

Date and venue
- Final: 15 November 2003
- Venue: Forum Copenhagen; Copenhagen, Denmark

Organisation
- Organiser: European Broadcasting Union (EBU)
- Executive supervisor: Svante Stockselius

Production
- Host broadcaster: Danmarks Radio (DR)
- Director: Arne J. Rasmussen
- Executive producer: Preben Vridstoft
- Presenters: Camilla Ottesen; Remee

Participants
- Number of entries: 16
- Debuting countries: Belarus; Belgium; Croatia; Cyprus; Denmark; Greece; Latvia; Macedonia; Malta; Netherlands; Norway; Poland; Romania; Spain; Sweden; United Kingdom
- Participation map: Participating countries

Vote
- Voting system: Each country awards 12, 10, 8–1 points to their 10 favourite songs.
- Winning song: Croatia "Ti si moja prva ljubav"

The Junior Eurovision Song Contest 2003 was the inaugural edition of the Junior Eurovision Song Contest, held on 15 November 2003 at Forum Copenhagen in Copenhagen, Denmark, and presented by Camilla Ottesen and Remee. It was organised by the European Broadcasting Union (EBU) and host broadcaster Danmarks Radio (DR). Broadcasters from sixteen countries participated in the contest.

The winner was Croatia with the song "Ti si moja prva ljubav" performed by the then eleven-year-old Dino Jelusić; while second and third place went to Spain and the United Kingdom respectively. The next time that a country would win on its first attempt was Italy in 2014.

It was the first Eurovision contest to be broadcast in the 16:9 widescreen and high definition, but was also offered to broadcasters in the traditional 4:3 aspect ratio. It was also the first Eurovision Song Contest where a DVD of the contest would be released. It was decided that the country that won the contest would not necessarily host the next contest, to reduce the pressure on the contestants. It was announced before the contest took place that the next edition would be held in the United Kingdom (although in the end this did not happen).

== Origins and history ==
The origins of the contest date back to 2000 when Danmarks Radio held a song contest for Danish children that year and the following year. The idea was extended to a Scandinavian song competition in 2002, known as MGP Nordic, with Denmark, Norway and Sweden as participants. The EBU picked up the idea for a song contest featuring children and opened the competition to all EBU member broadcasters making it a pan-European event. The working title of the programme was "Eurovision Song Contest for Children", branded with the name of the EBU's long-running and already popular song competition, the Eurovision Song Contest.

== Location ==
Denmark was asked to host the first programme after their experience with their own contests and the MGP Nordic. Copenhagen was confirmed as the host city in November 2002. In January 2003, it was announced that the Danish broadcaster would host the inaugural contest at the 8,000 capacity Forum venue in the Danish capital.

=== Venue ===
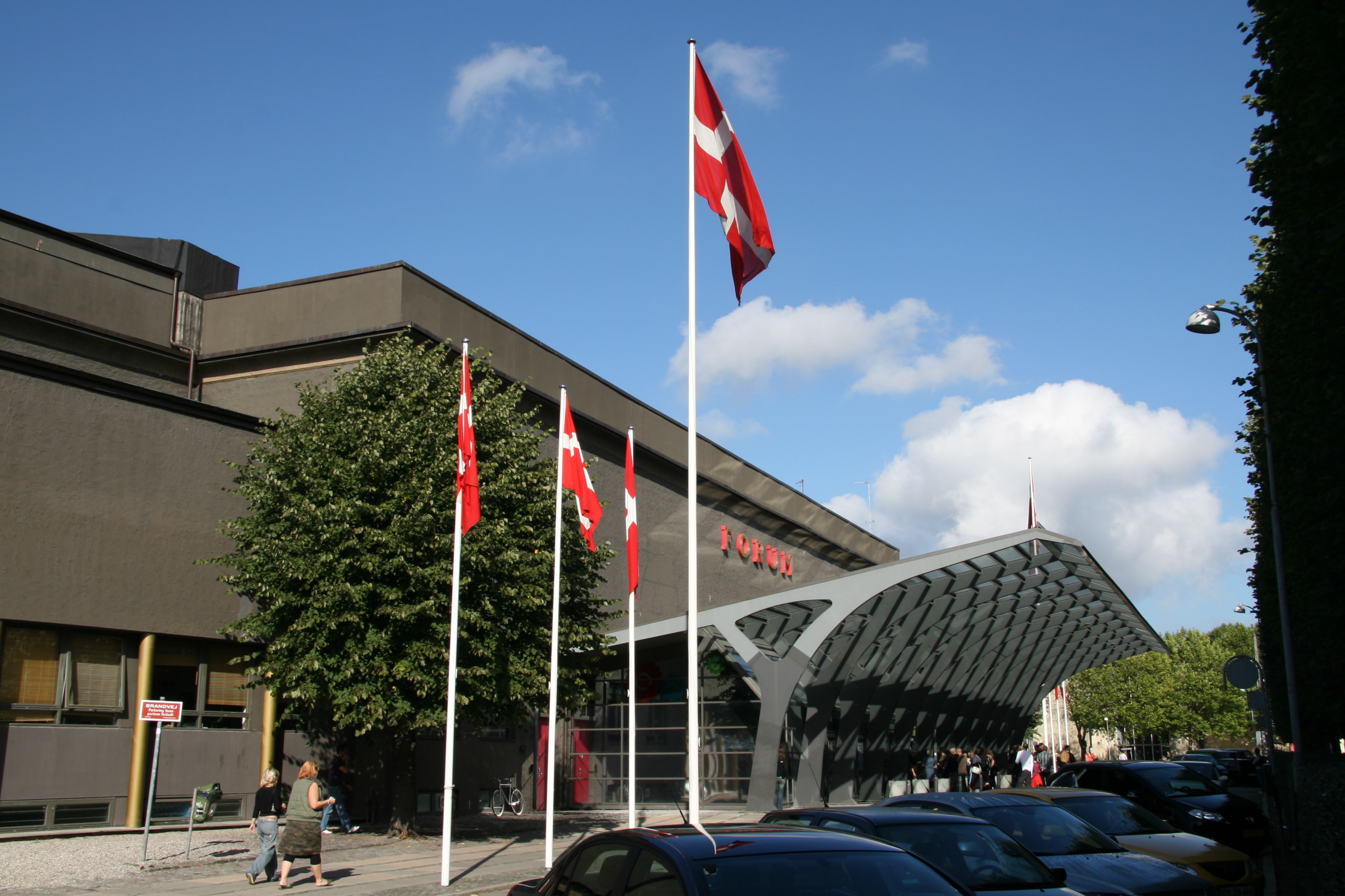
Forum in Copenhagen was the venue for the inaugural contest.

Forum Copenhagen (Danish: Forum København) is a large multi-purpose, rentable indoor arena located in Frederiksberg, Copenhagen, Denmark. It hosts a large variety of concerts, markets, exhibitions and other events. The venue can hold up to 10,000 people depending on the event. The Forum operates as a convention center, concert hall and indoor arena.

It was opened in February 1926 to host a car exhibition and was last renovated in 1996–97. Over two storeys there is a combined exhibition floor area of 5,000 m^{2} and a separate restaurant for up to 250 seated guests. The Metro station Forum is adjacent to the building. Forum Copenhagen was designed by Oscar Gundlach-Pedersen, and the lighting was from Poul Henningsen's brand new PH-lamp. In 1929 it held an architecture exhibition, which was one of the first presentations of functionalism in Denmark, namely the Housing and Building Exhibition in Forum. It was at this exhibition that Arne Jacobsen and Flemming Lassen exhibited their subscription to the cylindrical "House of the Future".

== Participants ==
Cover art of the official album

In May 2003, the EBU released the initial list of participants with 16 competing countries, in the first edition of the Junior Eurovision Song Contest. In an original press release for the contest, then entitled the "Eurovision Song Contest for Children", a draw was held to select 15 countries to take part in the inaugural contest, with Slovakian broadcaster Slovenská televízia (STV) and German broadcaster ARD being drawn to compete along with 13 other countries.

These countries would eventually be replaced by entries from Poland, Cyprus (added as 16th country before Germany and Slovakia withdrew) and Belarus, in their first ever Eurovision event. There were also reports that Finnish broadcaster Yle had planned to enter in the contest, but went on to just broadcast it instead.

Prior to the event, a compilation album featuring all the songs from the 2003 contest, (Note: On the track list Cyprus was misspelt as Cypres.) along with karaoke versions, was put together by the European Broadcasting Union and released by Universal Music Group in November 2003.

Participants of the Junior Eurovision Song Contest 2003
Country	Broadcaster	Artist	Song	Language	Songwriter(s)
Belarus	BTRC	Volha Satsiuk	"Tancuj" (Танцуй)	Belarusian	Katsiaryna Lipouskaya
Belgium	VRT	X!NK	"De vriendschapsband"	Dutch	Jonas Meukens; Thomas Valkiers
Croatia	HRT	Dino Jelusić	"Ti si moja prva ljubav"	Croatian	Dino Jelusić
Cyprus	CyBC	Theodora Rafti	"Mia efhi" (Μια ευχή)	Greek	Theodora Rafti
Denmark	DR	Anne Gadegaard	"Arabiens drøm"	Danish	Anne Gadegaard
Greece	ERT	Nicolas Ganopoulos	"Fili gia panta" (Φίλοι για πάντα)	Greek	Nicolas Ganopoulos
Latvia	LTV	Dzintars Čīča	"Tu esi vasarā"	Latvian	Dzintars Čīča
Macedonia	MRT	Marija and Viktorija	"Ti ne me poznavaš" (Ти не ме познаваш)	Macedonian	Irena Galabovska
Malta	PBS	Sarah Harrison	"Like a Star"	English	Sarah Harrison
Netherlands	AVRO	Roel	"Mijn ogen zeggen alles"	Dutch	Roel Felius
Norway	NRK	2U	"Sinnsykt gal forelsket"	Norwegian	Charlot Daysh; Kid Joki
Poland	TVP	Kasia Żurawik	"Coś mnie nosi"	Polish	Katarzyna Żurawik
Romania	TVR	Bubu	"Tobele sunt viața mea"	Romanian	Bubu Cernea
Spain	TVE	Sergio	"Desde el cielo"	Spanish	Sergio Jesús García
Sweden	SVT	The Honeypies	"Stoppa mig"	Swedish	Rebecka Laakso
United Kingdom	ITV	Tom Morley	"My Song for the World"	English	Tom Morley

== Format ==
=== Presenters ===
In February 2003, there was speculation regarding the potential host of the first ever Eurovision Song Contest for Children. Initially, the European Broadcasting Union (EBU), the organizer of the show, announced the possible allocation of this role to Irish vocalist and Eurovision Song Contest 1997 co-host Ronan Keating although no contract had yet been signed. On 10 October 2003, however, it was officially announced that the contest would be hosted by the Danish duo consisting of Camilla Ottesen and rapper Remee.

=== Voting ===
All countries used televoting to decide on their top ten. In normal Eurovision fashion, each country's favourite song was given 12 points, their second favourite 10, and their third to tenth favourites were given 8–1 points.

=== Postcards ===
The postcards featured all of the participants (and their backing dancers/singers) exploring different parts of Copenhagen. The postcard's audio would be an instrumental version of the opening theme. The following list shows the various places they visited:

1. Greece – The Tivoli Gardens
2. Croatia – Forum Copenhagen
3. Cyprus – Royal Danish Theatre
4. Belarus – Danish Aquarium
5. Latvia – Strøget
6. Macedonia – Copenhagen Lakes
7. Poland – A hotel in Copenhagen
8. Norway – Hairdressers in Copenhagen
9. Spain – Parken
10. Romania – Louis Tussaud's Wax Museum
11. Belgium – Copenhagen Skatepark
12. United Kingdom – Copenhagen Zoo
13. Denmark – A hotdog stand in Copenhagen
14. Sweden – The Round Tower
15. Malta – A riding school in Copenhagen
16. Netherlands – An internet café in Copenhagen

== Contest overview ==
The event took place on 15 November 2003 at 20:00 CET. Sixteen countries participated, with the running order published on 6 October 2003. All the countries competing were eligible to vote by televote. Croatia won with 134 points, with Spain, the United Kingdom, Belarus, and Denmark, completing the top five. Macedonia, Norway, Cyprus, Sweden, and Poland, occupied the bottom five positions.

The show was opened by Danish boy band Fu:el and dance crew Dance Faction. The interval act included two British acts: the Sugababes performed "Hole in the Head", while Busted, with the exception of Charlie Simpson absent due to illness, performed "Crashed the Wedding".

R/O	Country	Artist	Song	Points	Place
1	Greece	Nicolas Ganopoulos	"Fili gia panta"	53	8
2	Croatia	Dino Jelusić	"Ti si moja prva ljubav"	134	1
3	Cyprus	Theodora Rafti	"Mia efhi"	16	14
4	Belarus	Volha Satsiuk	"Tancuj"	103	4
5	Latvia	Dzintars Čīča	"Tu esi vasarā"	37	9
6	Macedonia	Marija and Viktorija	"Ti ne me poznavaš"	19	12
7	Poland	Kasia Żurawik	"Coś mnie nosi"	3	16
8	Norway	2U	"Sinnsykt gal forelsket"	18	13
9	Spain	Sergio	"Desde el cielo"	125	2
10	Romania	Bubu	"Tobele sunt viața mea"	35	10
11	Belgium	X!NK	"De vriendschapsband"	83	6
12	United Kingdom	Tom Morley	"My Song for the World"	118	3
13	Denmark	Anne Gadegaard	"Arabiens drøm"	93	5
14	Sweden	The Honeypies	"Stoppa mig"	12	15
15	Malta	Sarah Harrison	"Like a Star"	56	7
16	Netherlands	Roel	"Mijn ogen zeggen alles"	23	11

=== Spokespersons ===
1. Greece – Chloe Sofia Boleti
2. Croatia – TBC
3. Cyprus – Tina Nikolaou
4. Belarus – TBC
5. Latvia – David Daurins
6. Macedonia – Filip Kiprovski
7. Poland – Marta
8. Norway – Benna Jimm
9. Spain – Jimmy Castro
10. Romania – Liana Ursu
11. Belgium – Judith Bussé
12. United Kingdom – Sasha Stevens
13. Denmark – TBC
14. Sweden – Siri Lindgren
15. Malta – Destiny
16. Netherlands – Aisa Renardus

== Detailed voting results ==
Detailed voting results
		Total score	Greece	Croatia	Cyprus	Belarus	Latvia	Macedonia	Poland	Norway	Spain	Romania	Belgium	United Kingdom	Denmark	Sweden	Malta	Netherlands
Contestants	Greece	53		7	12	1	5	1	1	7		5	2	7	1	3		1
Contestants	Croatia	134	10		8	10	8	12	10	12	2	12	8	8	8	8	8	10
Contestants	Cyprus	16	12							1				3				
Contestants	Belarus	103	5	12	6		10	10	12	10	1	7	5	5	4	7	6	3
Contestants	Latvia	37		5		8		4	3	3		1	3	1			3	6
Contestants	Macedonia	19		10		2										1	2	4
Contestants	Poland	3				3												
Contestants	Norway	18		1			3	2			5				3	4		
Contestants	Spain	125	8	8	10	6	12	8	8	6		8	10	12	6	6	10	7
Contestants	Romania	35	4		5		2	5	2		6		6				5	
Contestants	Belgium	83	3	6	2	7	4	6	6	4	8	3		6	7	5	4	12
Contestants	United Kingdom	118	7	4	7	12	7	3	7	5	10	10	4		12	10	12	8
Contestants	Denmark	93	6	2	4	5	6	7	5	8	12	6	7	4		12	7	2
Contestants	Sweden	12			1					2	3				5		1	
Contestants	Malta	56	2	3	3	4	1		4		7	4	1	10	10	2		5
Contestants	Netherlands	23	1								4	2	12	2	2			

=== 12 points ===
Below is a summary of the maximum 12 points each country awarded to another:

N.	Contestant	Nation(s) giving 12 points
3	Croatia	Macedonia, Norway, Romania
3	United Kingdom	Belarus, Denmark, Malta
2	Belarus	Croatia, Poland
2	Denmark	Spain, Sweden
2	Spain	Latvia, United Kingdom
1	Belgium	Netherlands
1	Cyprus	Greece
1	Greece	Cyprus
1	Netherlands	Belgium

== Other countries ==
For a country to be eligible for potential participation in the Junior Eurovision Song Contest, it needs to be an active member of the EBU. It is currently unknown whether the EBU issue invitations of participation to all 56 active members like they do for the Eurovision Song Contest.

- Finland – Finnish broadcaster Yle expressed an interest in participating in the contest. However, it was unsuccessful and they went on to broadcast it instead.
- Germany – The EBU announced that they would hold a draw to determine which countries would participate in the contest. German broadcaster KiKa was one of the countries drawn. However, they announced their withdrawal from the contest and went on to broadcast it instead. Germany wouldn't debut at Junior Eurovision until 2020.
- Ireland – After Germany and Slovakia withdrew, the EBU sent an invitation to Irish broadcaster Raidió Teilifís Éireann (RTÉ) who then submitted preliminary applications, but in the end declined to participate or broadcast the contest. Ireland did, however, debut with TG4 as the broadcaster in 2015.
- Israel – The EBU also sent an invitation to the Israel Broadcasting Authority (IBA), but they declined to participate and also did not broadcast it. Ireland and Israel would later be replaced by Poland and Belarus, who received the final spot.
- Slovakia – Slovakian broadcaster Slovenská televízia (STV), along with KiKa, was drawn to participate in the contest, however declined to participate and did not broadcast the show either.

== Broadcasts ==
The rights to broadcast the contest were also acquired by broadcasters in Iceland (RÚV), Finland (Yle), Serbia and Montenegro (RTS/RTCG), Estonia (ETV), Germany (KI.KA), Australia (SBS) and Kosovo (RTK). Some of the participating broadcasters also transmitted the programme live on radio.

Broadcasters and commentators in participating countries
Country	Broadcaster(s)	Channel(s)	Commentator(s)	Ref.
Belarus	BTRC	Belarus 1	Denis Kurian	
Belgium	VRT	TV1	Dutch: Ilse Van Hoecke and Bart Peeters	
Belgium	RTBF	La Deux, RTBF Sat	French: Corinne Boulangier	
Croatia	HRT	HRT 1	Unknown	
Cyprus	CyBC	RIK 1	Katerina Karajani	
Denmark	DR	DR1	Nicolai Molbech	
Greece	ERT	ET1	Masa Fasoula and Nikos Frantseskakis	
Latvia	LTV	LTV1	Kārlis Streips	
Malta	PBS	TVM	Unknown	
Macedonia	MKRTV	MTV 2	Milanka Rašik	
Netherlands	AVRO	Nederland 1	Angela Groothuizen	
Norway	NRK	NRK1	Stian Barsnes Simonsen	
Poland	TVP	TVP2	Jarosław Kulczycki	
Romania	TVR	TVR1	Ioana Isopecu and Alexandru Nagy	
Spain	TVE (via RTVE)	La Primera	Fernando Argenta	
Sweden	SVT	SVT1	Victoria Dyring	
United Kingdom	ITV	ITV1	Mark Durden-Smith and Tara Palmer-Tomkinson	

Broadcasters and commentators in non-participating countries
Country	Broadcaster(s)	Channel(s)	Commentator(s)	Ref.
Australia	SBS	SBS TV (Note: Delayed broadcast on 29 November 2003 at 19:00 AEST)	Des Mangan	
Estonia	ETV (Note: Delayed broadcast on 28 December 2003 at 19:00 EET)		Unknown	
Finland	YLE	YLE TV2 (Note: Delayed broadcast on the day at 21:15 EET)	Henna Vänninen and Olavi Uusivirta	
Germany	ARD	KI.KA (delayed)	Unknown	
Iceland	RÚV	Sjónvarpið	Unknown	
Serbia & Montenegro	RTCG	RTCG 1	Unknown	
Serbia & Montenegro	RTS	RTS2	Unknown	
Serbia & Montenegro	RTK	RTK 1	Unknown	

== See also ==
- European Broadcasting Union
- Eurovision Song Contest 2003
- Junior Eurovision Song Contest
