= International Music Conference =

The International Music Conference
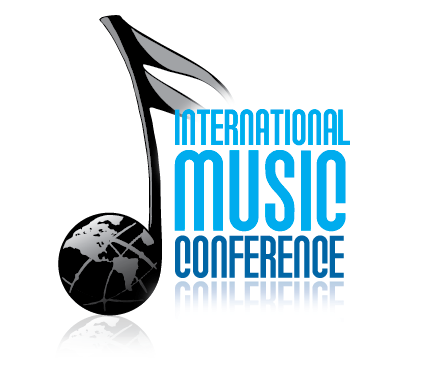
- Official IMC logo
- Frequency: Annual
- Locations: Atlanta, Georgia, United States
- Years active: 15
- Inaugurated: 2011
- Founders: Julia Huie-Martin
- Next event: 2014
- Organizer: The Bridge Entertainment
- Website: theinternationalmusicconference.com

The International Music Conference (IMC) is a multiple day music conference held annually in Atlanta, Georgia, United States. Formed in 2011, the globally focused conference is aimed at connecting the world's leading entertainment professionals, including artists, producers, disc jockeys, executives, attorneys, media and many more. The International Music Conference is run by a parent company called the Bridge Entertainment, registered in London, England.

== Background ==
=== Inception ===
The conference was founded by a London native named Julia Huie-Martin in 2011. It has since grown its participation significantly from the inaugural event, with attendance for 2013 well into the hundreds.

=== Events ===
Multiple events take place throughout each day of the International Music Conference including invitation-only networking events and showcases for DJs, artists and producers. Promotional events also take place in other regions of the world including New York City and London.

== History ==
=== 2011 ===
The event's opening night was hosted by Miss Black Britain. Appearances were made by those including Bryan-Michael Cox, Drumma Boy, Chuck Harmony, Bangladesh and Rico Love.

=== 2012 ===
Panel topics in 2012 covered international markets, promotion and marketing. Attendance included Kane Beatz, Claude Kelly, DJ Trauma and Manuel Seal. DJ Khaled was the event's guest speaker.

=== 2013 ===
SESAC was a primary sponsor for the conference in 2013. The organization hosted a popular music speed dating breakout session, with more than 60 participants, including Traci Hale and Kendrick Dean. Singer Mylah won the conference's Artist Showcase, while Jus Clae and Kamal were winners of the DJ competition and Producer Showcase, respectively.
