= Daniel Kajmakoski =

Daniel Kajmakoski Даниел Кајмакоски
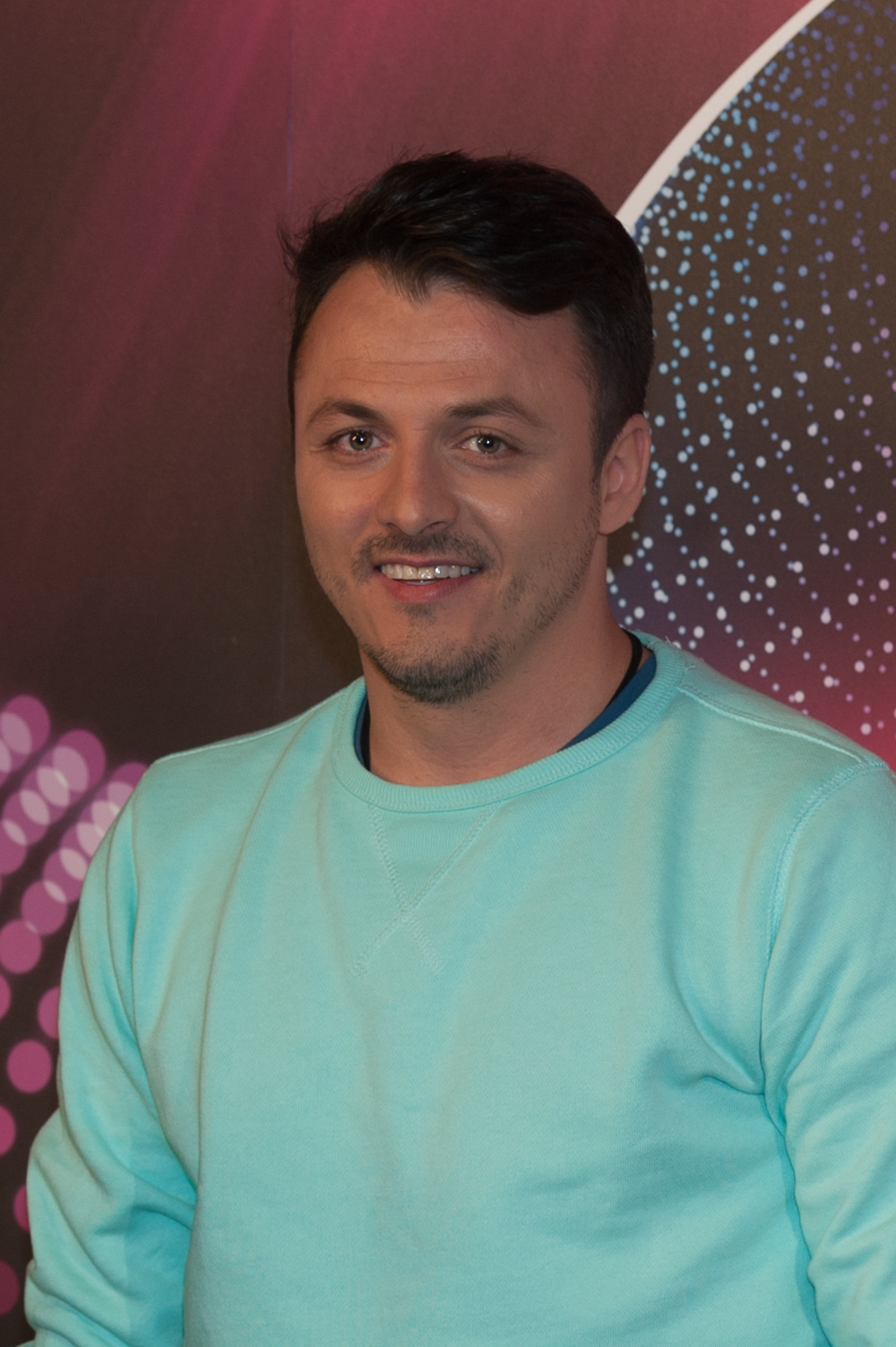
- Kajmakoski in 2015

Background information
- Born: 17 October 1983 (age 42); Struga, SR Macedonia, SFR Yugoslavia (present-day North Macedonia)
- Origin: Struga, North Macedonia
- Genres: Pop; pop rock
- Occupations: Singer; songwriter
- Instrument: Vocals
- Website: kajmakoskidaniel.com

Daniel Kajmakoski-Gragevinac (Macedonian: Даниел Кајмакоски-Граѓевинац, born 17 October 1983) is a Macedonian singer and songwriter. He is best known for having won the first series of X Factor Adria. He represented Macedonia in the Eurovision Song Contest 2015 in Vienna, Austria with the song "Autumn Leaves" after winning the Skopje Festival 2014.

== Life and career ==
=== 1983–2013: Early career ===
Kajmakoski was born in the city of Struga, Yugoslavia, on 17 October 1983. When he was just 7 years old, he moved to Vienna, Austria, together with his family. Daniel has two brothers, Dalibor and Filip Kajmakoski. Daniel participated in many competitions. He was 17 years old when he participated in a show for the first time. He reached top 12. In 2009, was his first performance in Macedonia at Ohrid Fest with the song "Nezhna ko princeza" which was composed and written by himself. Daniel has also participated in the Bulgarian show "Pej S'men. After that he returned to Vienna, where he got a job but meanwhile he always worked around the music. In 2010, he was part of the "One-Worl-Projekt" of Thomas Raber, which was one of the Austrian candidates for the Eurovision Song Contest 2011, but the jury didn't vote it for the final show. In 2011, he wrote a song for Karolina Goceva called "Ne se vrajkas" which became a huge hit in Macedonia and in the Balkans.

=== 2013–2014: X Factor Adria ===
In 2013, he appeared in the auditions of the first series of X Factor Adria. He sang the song "Red" by Daniel Merriweather on his first audition and already impressed everyone, eventually winning the show on 23 March 2014. Daniel's first single came the summer right after his victory. The song was called "Skopje-Beograd" and was a duet between Daniel and one of the X Factor jury members, Željko Joksimović, who represented Serbia during the Eurovision Song Contest 2012 with the song Nije ljubav stvar.

- Week 1: "One" (by U2)
- Week 2: "Čija si" (by Tose Proeski)
- Week 3: "Sonce ne me gree" (by Vlatko Lozanoski)
- Week 4: "Counting Stars" (by OneRepublic)
- Week 5: "Wake Me Up" (by Avicii)
- Week 6: "Stay" (by Hurts)
- Week 7: "Unchained Melody" ("Ghost")
- Week 8: "Ljubavi" (by Željko Joksimović)
- Final: "Sex on Fire" (by Kings of Leon), "Angels" (by Robbie Williams), "The Hardest Thing" (by Toše Proeski), "Red" (by Daniel Merriweather)

=== 2014–present: Eurovision Song Contest 2015 ===
Daniel Kajmakoski represented Macedonia at the Eurovision Song Contest 2015, which was held in Vienna, Austria. Kajmakoski was selected to represent the nation through his victory at the Skopje Festival 2014, which was organised by Macedonian Radio Television in order to select Macedonia's entry for the 2015 Contest. With his song "Lisja esenski", he won the competition after placing second with an international jury and achieving first place from a public televote. At Eurovision the song received 28 points placing 15th (second to last) in the semi-final therefore not qualifying for the final. This was the 3rd time in a row that Macedonia did not qualify for the grand final.

On 22 May 2016 he won the third season of Tvoje lice zvuči poznato (Serbian version of Your Face Sounds Familiar). After a wide pallet of enjoyed performances as Rammstein, Gibonni, Karolina Gočeva, Prince, and many more, he claimed the victory as Måns Zelmerlöw.

== Discography ==
=== Singles ===
- 2009 "Nezna ko princeza"
- 2013 "Sloboda" (feat. Toni Zen)
- 2014 "Skopje-Beograd" (feat. Željko Joksimović)
- 2014 "Autumn Leaves" / "Lisja esenski"
- 2014 "Ne mogu protiv srca svog"
- 2014 "Sekoj" (feat. Zlatno Slavejce)
- 2014 "Za mig " (feat. Tamara Todevska)
- 2015 "Live It" Qatar 2015 Official Anthem "أغنية قطر 2015 الرسمية "عيشها (feat. Alexander Rybak, Ewa Farna, Lana Jurcevic, OCEANA, Rafal Brozozwski, ALYA, Marija Sestic, OLA, Amine Djammel, Fallulah, Lucas Silveira; Jon Jonsson, Nyusha; Pablo Lopez; Francesca Valenzuela; Shahab Tiam; Charlee; Mani; Fahad Al Kubaisi; Hasan Kharbesh; Carmen Suleiman; Daniela Herrero; Jaber Al Kaser)
- 2015 "Carry The Flame – Носи го огнот" (Official HH Anthem) (feat. BOBO, MERJ formerly from BLACKSTREET)
- 2015 "10 Leta", "Decenije"
- 2016 "Samo za ljubav"

Awards and achievements
Preceded by First	X Factor Adria; Winner; 2014	Succeeded by Amel Ćurić
Preceded by Lambe Alabakoski	Skopje Fest; Winner; 2014	Succeeded by Eye Cue
Preceded by Tijana Dapčević with "To the Sky"	Macedonia in the Eurovision Song Contest; 2015	Succeeded by Kaliopi with "Dona"
