= X!NK =

Belgian pop punk band

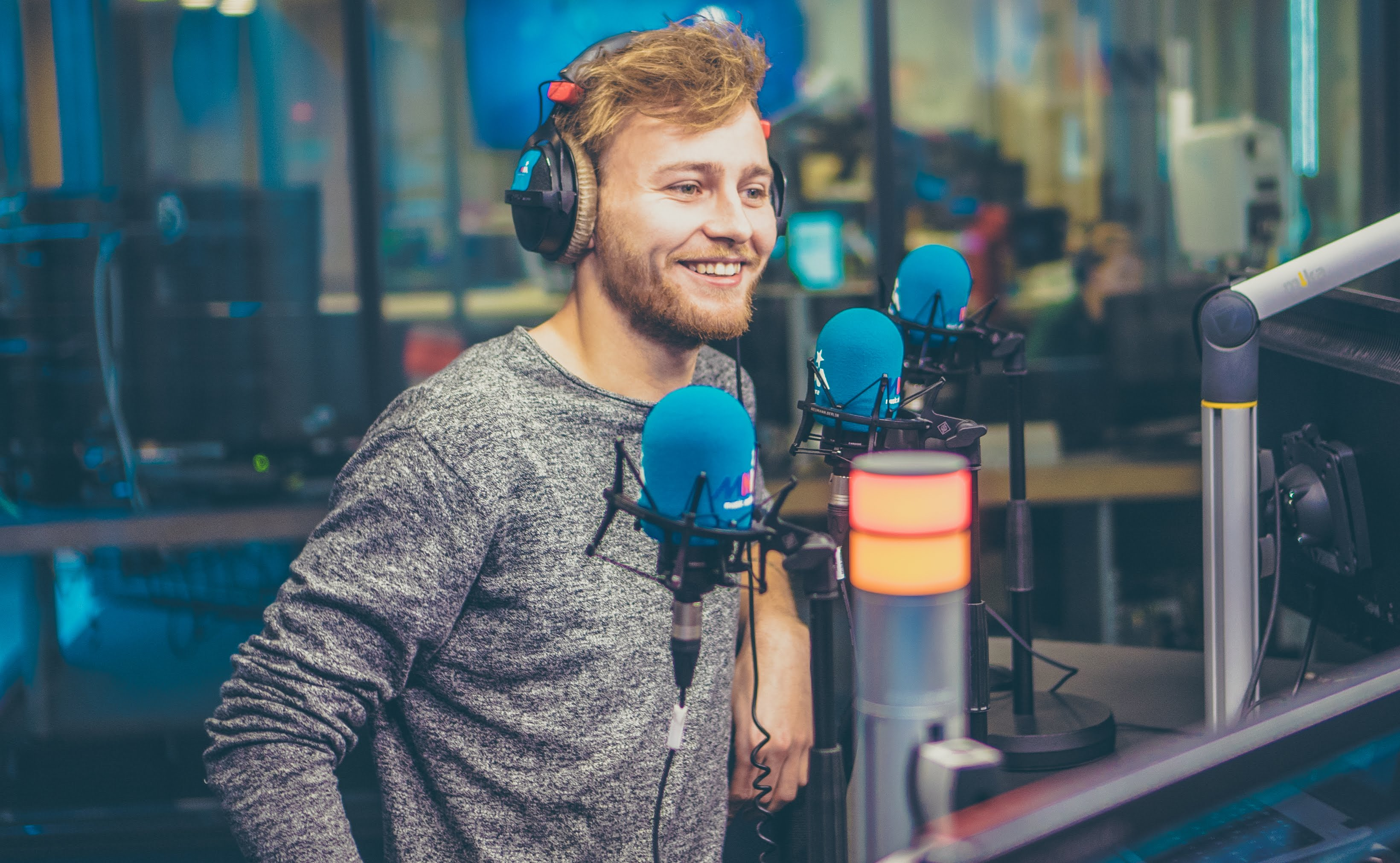
- Jonas Meukens in 2017

Background information
- Origin: Belgium
- Genres: Pop punk
- Years active: 2001–2009, 2022–present
- Spinoffs: The Crackups
- Members: Jonas Meukens (lead guitar, vocals); Niels Meukens (drums); Philip Valkiers (bass); Thomas Valkiers (electric guitar, keyboards)
- Website: http://www.xink.be/

X!NK (/ʃɪŋk/) is a Belgian pop punk band. The band consisted of two pairs of brothers: Jonas and Niels Meukens, and Thomas and Philip Valkiers. Jonas was the lead singer and occasionally the second guitarist, his brother Niels was the drummer. Philip played the bass guitar and Thomas played the guitar and also occasionally the keyboard. X!NK gained mainstream success after becoming Belgium's submission for the 2003 Junior Eurovision Song Contest where they took sixth place. The band was also the subject of a series of comic books by Mario Boon. The band is planning on making a comeback with a new song and four concerts in 2023.

== History ==
=== Junior Eurovision Song Contest ===
In the national qualifying rounds for the Junior Eurovision Song Contest in Belgium, X!NK competed against nine other contestants: Laura, Martijn, Remi, Kia, Jelly Pie, Simon MC, the twin girls Tonya and Charlotte. X!NK beat, Tonya the second-place winner with a difference of 3 points.

The band then represented Belgium at the first Junior Eurovision Song Contest on 15 November 2003 with the song "De Vriendschapsband" (The Bond/Band Between/Of Friends). The song, which they wrote themselves, is about the origin of their band and their friendship. In the field of 16 contestants, they ended in sixth place with 83 points at the final in Copenhagen, Denmark. The first place was for Dino representing Croatia and the second place for Sergio from Spain with a song dedicated to his mother who died some months before the contest.

Like the other contestants, they got to record their entry in a studio with a professional producer, in their case Paul Despiegelaere. Their winning song was released as a single.

=== After the Junior Eurovision Song Contest ===
X!NK launched their second single, named "Oh-Ho" in the beginning of 2004. Later that year their first album, containing twelve songs was released. The album went gold in Flanders (the Dutch language area of Belgium).

X!NK often perform at rock festivals in Belgium (for example Marktrock in Leuven). In 2004, they released the song "Laat Me Vrij" (Let Me Free) which served as the theme song for the Flemish version of Garfield. For the sequel to Ice Age, Ice Age: The Meltdown which debuted in Flemish cinemas on 31 March 2006, they recorded the song "De Andere Kant" (The Other Side) which served as the theme song for this film. Lead singer Jonas also provided the Dutch voice for the character Jimmy the Anteater in the film.

Their second album Vergif (Poison) was released on 30 September 2005. They also performed on the big 0110-event in Belgium. They opened the show in Ghent.

The band announced their split in 2009.

Recently Niels and Thomas also play in another Belgian band called The Crackups with two other musicians.

=== Reunion concert and comeback ===
X!NK announced they would reunite for a concert in Brussels. When the concert sold out within minutes, the band announced three more shows, which are all sold out as well. The band later announced new music, with a new lead single 'Misschien'.

After decent commercial success, and multiple successful shows and festival appearances, the band continued releasing new singles. After 'Misschien' we quickly got 'Aura' and 'Ik Wil de Wereld Zien'. The two newest songs did not catch the eye of the mainstream public as 'Misschien' did, but the band kept true to their philosophy of bringing raw, Flemish, pop punk and forged a core audience.

2024 started with some bad news as bassist and original member of the double pair of brothers, Philip Valkiers, left the group. Citing differences within the group as his reason to leave. It took a while for the news to come out to the public, so a new bassist was quickly found in Jasper Mulier.

With Jasper, the band continued and announced an upcoming album 'Dag Nul'.

== Discography ==
=== Albums ===
Title	Translation	Release date (in Belgium)	Notes
X!NK	X!NK	20 September 2004	Self-titled debut album.
Vergif	Poison	29 September 2005	Second album
Dag Nul	Day Zero	February 2025	Third album - first since reunion

=== Singles ===
Title	Translation	Release date (in Belgium)	Notes
"De Vriendschapsband"	The Band of Friends	6 October 2003	Single of winning Junior Eurovision Song Contest entry.
"Oh-Ho"	Oh-Ho	9 February 2004	
"Laat Mij Vrij"	Let Me Free	12 July 2004	Theme song for Garfield: The Movie
"Sorry"	Sorry	8 November 2004	
"Denk Aan Mij"	Think About Me	20 August 2005	
"Hou Ons Niet Tegen"	Don't Stop Us	2 December 2005	
"De Andere Kant"	The Other Side	17 February 2006	Theme song for Ice Age: The Meltdown
"Give Us a future"	Give Us a future	October–December 2007	Theme song for Junior Eurosong 2007
"Misschien"	Maybe	November 2022	
"Aura"	Aura	June 2023	
"Ik Wil De Wereld Zien"	I Want To See The World	September 2023	
"Neem Me Mee"	Bring Me	October 2024	
"Waar Gaan We Heen"	Where Do We Go	November 2024	
"Op Hoop Van Zegen"	A Hail Mary	January 2025	

Preceded by none	Belgium in the Junior Eurovision Song Contest; 2003	Succeeded by Free Spirits
