= Tanja Carovska =

Macedonian singer (born 1980)

Tanja Carovska (Macedonian: Тања Царовска, pronounced [ˈtaɲa ˈtsarɔfska]; born 19 March 1980 in Resen, Macedonia) is a Macedonian singer, songwriter, and composer.

== Style ==
Her style is described as belonging to the Balkan and Byzantine harmonic genres, and her vocals have been described as "angelic". In her song-writing Tanja often combines Macedonian traditional melodies with her original contemporary English lyrics.

== Career ==
She has completed No Record of Wrong, her first album of original songs and covers, in 2010. She performed a duet with Josh Groban for Wolfgang Petersen's Troy and was also the featured vocalist in John Debney's score for Mel Gibson's The Passion of the Christ. She appeared in 1 Giant Leap, a music/philosophy documentary film by Jamie Catto and Duncan Bridgeman, as well as Milcho Manchevski's latest film Mothers and the computer game Fable III.
