= Victoria Dyring =

Swedish TV host and film producer

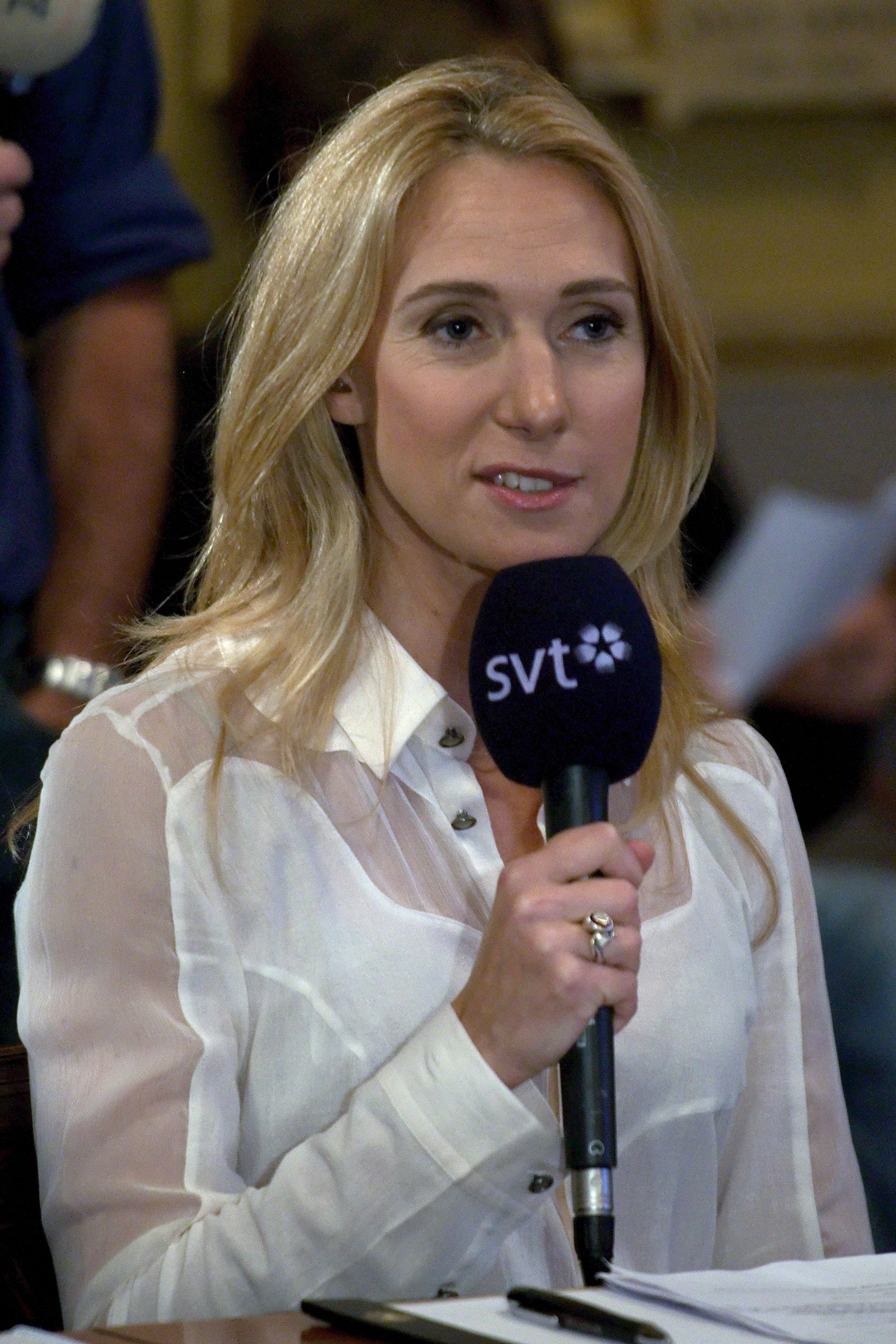
- Victoria Dyring
- Born: 18 December 1972 (age 53); Uppsala, Sweden
- Occupations: TV presenter, film producer

Sonja Victoria Dyring (born 18 December 1972 in Uppsala) is a Swedish TV host and film producer. She is a former host of the knowledge TV program Hjärnkontoret. Since 2010 she has hosted Vetenskapens värld. She has also hosted and appeared on Vi i femman (2001–03, together with Jonas Hallberg), National Day celebrations, Nobel Prize programmes and Lilla Melodifestivalen (in 2003).

== Education ==
Dyring's parents are science journalists and her sister is a physicist. Dyring studied theatre at university. She has also studied natural science.

== Awards ==
- 2002 - Gunilla Arhéns förebildspris
- 2010 - Dyring became honorary degree at Stockholm University
