= Greece in the Junior Eurovision Song Contest =

- Junior Eurovision Song Contest
- Participating broadcaster: Hellenic Broadcasting Corporation (ERT)

Participation summary
- Appearances: 6
- First appearance: 2003
- Last appearance: 2008
- Highest placement: 6th: 2005
- Participation history: 2003; 2004; 2005; 2006; 2007; 2008; 2009 – 2025

Greece has been represented at the Junior Eurovision Song Contest six times, entering at the first contest in 2003. The Greek participating broadcaster in the contest is Hellenic Broadcasting Corporation (ERT). Its first entry was "Fili gia panta" by eight-year-old Nicolas Ganopoulos, which came eighth. Its best entry was in 2005 when "Tora einai i seira mas" by Alexandros and Kalli placed sixth, while its worst result was in 2007, when "Made in Greece" placed 17th (last) with 14 points. ERT has not taken part in the contest since 2008.

== History ==
Greece was one of the 16 nations to take part in the inaugural edition of the Junior Eurovision Song Contest in 2003, and participated in six consecutive contests. 2008 marked their last appearance, with the Greek national broadcaster Hellenic Broadcasting Corporation (ERT) stating that relatively low television ratings for the contest and an objection to using children were factors in the decision. The next year, ERT added through a press release that the Greek government-debt crisis was an additional factor.

In January 2014, it was reported that New Hellenic Radio, Internet and Television (NERIT) was interested in bringing the nation back to the contest, taking over from then defunct broadcaster ERT. However, it was later confirmed that Greece would continue its absence from the competition. In June 2020, it was reported that ERT (now back as Greece's EBU participating broadcaster) was seriously considering returning to the contest in 2020; however, weeks later, the broadcaster had decided against its return.

== Participation overview ==
Table key
◁	Last place

Year	Artist	Song	Language	Place	Points
2003	Nicolas Ganopoulos	"Fili gia panta" (Φίλοι για πάντα)	Greek	8	53
2004	Secret Band	"O palios mou eaftos" (Ο παλιός μου εαυτός)	Greek	9	48
2005	Alexandros and Kalli	"Tora einai i seira mas" (Tώρα είναι η σειρά μας)	Greek	6	88
2006	Chloe Sofia Boleti	"Den peirazei" (Δεν πειράζει)	Greek	13	35
2007	Made In Greece	"Kapou berdeftika" (Κάπου μπερδεύτηκα)	Greek	17 ◁	14
2008	Niki Yannouchou	"Kapoia nychta" (Κάποια νύχτα)	Greek	14	19

== Commentators and spokespersons ==
The contests are broadcast online worldwide through the official Junior Eurovision Song Contest website junioreurovision.tv and YouTube. In 2015, the online broadcasts featured commentary in English by junioreurovision.tv editor Luke Fisher and 2011 Bulgarian Junior Eurovision Song Contest entrant Ivan Ivanov. The Greek broadcaster, ERT, sent their own commentators to each contest in order to provide commentary in the Greek language. Spokespersons were also chosen by the national broadcaster in order to announce the awarding points from Greece. The table below list the details of each commentator and spokesperson since 2003.

Year(s)	Commentator	Spokesperson	Ref.
2003	Masa Fasoula and Nikos Frantseskakis	Chloe Sofia Boleti	
2004	Unknown	Kalli Georgelli	
2005	Unknown	George Koutsogiannis	
2006	Renia Tsitsibikou and George Amyras	Alexandros Chountas	
2007	Marion Mihelidaki	Chloe Sofia Boleti	
2008	Renia Tsitsibikou and George Amyras	Stefani Trepekli	
2009–2012	No broadcast	Did not participate	N/A
2013	Unknown	Did not participate	
2014–2026	No broadcast	Did not participate	N/A

== See also ==
- Greece in the Eurovision Song Contest
