= List of films from North Macedonia =

A list of feature films produced or filmed in the territory of modern-day North Macedonia.

== Ottoman Empire ==
=== 1900s ===
Title	Director	Year	Genre	Notes
Weavers	Manaki Brothers	1905	Documentary	First motion picture on the Balkan Peninsula.
School in an open environment	Manaki Brothers	1908	Documentary	
Parade of military band, chariots and horsemen	Manaki Brothers	1908	Documentary	
Manifestation (with Greek inscriptions)	Manaki Brothers	1908	Documentary	
Manifestation on the occasion of the Young Turk Revolution	Manaki Brothers	1908	Documentary	
Manifestation marking the Hurriyet	Manaki Brothers	1908	Documentary	
Parade marking the Hurriyet	Manaki Brothers	1908	Documentary	
Turks hold speech on Hurriyet	Manaki Brothers	1908	Documentary	

=== 1910s ===
Title	Director	Year	Genre	Notes
Funeral of Metropolitan Emilianos of Grevena	Manaki Brothers	1911	Documentary	
Panorama of Grevena	Manaki Brothers	1911	Documentary	
Romanian Delegation visit to Bitola	Manaki Brothers	1911	Documentary	
Romanian delegation visiting Gopesh	Manaki Brothers	1911	Documentary	
Romanian delegation visiting Resen	Manaki Brothers	1911	Documentary	
Turkish Sultan Mehmed V Reshad Visiting Bitola	Manaki Brothers	1911	Documentary	
Turkish Sultan Mehmed V Reshad Visiting Salonica	Manaki Brothers	1911	Documentary	
Church in Grevena	Manaki Brothers	1911	Documentary	
Alexander Karadjordjevic visiting Bitola	Manaki Brothers	1912	Documentary	
Opening city café in Bitola	Manaki Brothers	1912	Documentary	

== Kingdom of Yugoslavia ==
=== 1920s ===
Title	Created by	Year	Genre	Notes
Macedonia in Pictures	Macedonian Society in Sofia	1923	Documentary	Made on behalf 20 years from the Ilinden Uprising.

=== 1940s ===
Title	Director	Year	Genre	Notes
Bombing of Bitola	Milton Manaki	1940	War documentary	
Entering of the National Liberation Army in Bitola	Milton Manaki	1944	Documentary	

== SFR Yugoslavia ==
=== 1950s ===
Title	Director	Year	Genre	Notes
Frosina	Vojislav Nanović	1952	Social	The first film of independent Socialist Macedonia
Wolf's Night	France Štiglic	1955	Fiction	Volca nok
Riot Dolls	Dimitrie Osmanli	1957	Short film	
Little Man	Žika Čukulić	1957	Drama	Mali covek
Sun behind bars	Slavko Janevski	1957	Social	
A gift from the space painter	Dimitar Kjostarov	1957	Short film	
Miss Stone	Žika Mitrović	1958	Historical	The first Macedonian motion picture in color.
Evil Visa	France Štiglic	1959	Crime fiction	The False Passport
Three Anne's	Branko Bauer	1959	Psychological	Three Girls Named Anna
Dubrovski	William Diterle	1959	Fiction	

=== 1960s ===
Title	Director	Year	Genre	Notes
David, Goliath and a rooster	Slavko Janevski	1960	Short	
Quiet Summer	Dimitrie Osmanli	1961	Comedy	First Macedonian Comedy
The Salonika Terrorists	Žika Mitrović	1961	Historical	
Greeting of Tito in Bitola	Milton Manaki	1963	Documentary	
Under the Same Sky	Ljubiša Georgievski	1964	War	Pod isto nebo
Days of Temptation	Branko Gapo	1965	Historical	Also known as Denovi na iskusenie
To Victory and Beyond	Žika Mitrović	1966	War	Also known as To Victory and Further
Macedonian Blood Wedding	Trajče Popov	1967	Historical	
Memento	Dimitrie Osmanli	1967	Psychological	
Where After the Rain	Vladan Slijepćević	1967	Fiction	
Mountain of Wrath	Ljubiša Georgievski	1968	Social	
War-less Time	Branko Gapo	1969	Fiction	
Republic in Flames	Ljubiša Georgievski	1969	Historical	

=== 1970s ===
Title	Director	Year	Genre	Notes
The Price of the City	Ljubiša Georgievski	1970	War	Also known as The Price of a Town
Black Seed	Kiril Cenevski	1971	Drama	
The Macedonian Part of Hell	Vatroslav Mimica	1971	War	
Embrio № M	Petar Gligorovski	1971	Animated	First Macedonian fully animated feature film.
Thirst	Dimitrie Osmanli	1971	Social	Also known as Zedj
Shot	Branko Gapo	1972	War	
Father (We're Cursed, Irene)	Kole Angelovski	1973	Psychological	
Anguish	Kiril Cenevski	1975	Historical	Also known as Misery
The Longest Path	Branko Gapo	1976	Historical	Also known as The Longest Journey
Rise Up, Delfina	Aleksandar Gjurcinov	1977	Psychological	Also known as Stand Up Straight Delfina
Judgement	Trajče Popov	1977	War	Also known as The Verdict or Presuda
Dae	Stole Popov	1979	Documentary	

=== 1980s ===
Title	Director	Year	Genre	Notes
The Lead Brigade	Kiril Cenevski	1980	Fiction	
Time Leads	Branko Gapo	1980	Social	Vreme, vodi
The Red Horse	Stole Popov	1981	Historical	
Southern Path	Stevo Crvenkovski	1982	Fiction	Juzna pateka
Opasni trag	Miomir 'Miki' Stamenković	1984	Crime, Thriller	
Haven't I Told You	Stevo Crvenkovski	1984	Historical	Neli ti rekov
Node	Kiril Cenevski	1985	War	Also known as Jazol
Happy New Year '49	Stole Popov	1986	Drama	It was Yugoslavia's submission to the 59th Academy Awards for the Academy Award for Best Foreign Language Film.
Hi-Fi	Vladimir Blaževski	1987	Social	
Cadaver Weekend	Kole Angelovski	1988	Comedy	Also known as A Weekend of Deceased Persons

=== 1990s ===
Title	Director	Year	Genre	Notes
Tattoo	Stole Popov	1991	Drama	The last Macedonian film before the independence from Yugoslavia.

== Republic of Macedonia ==
=== 1990s ===
Title	Director	Year	Genre	Notes
Vreme, zivot	Ivan Mitevski	1992	Drama, Romance	
Svetlo sivo	Srđan Janićijević	1993	Drama	
Macedonian Saga	Branko Gapo	1993	Melodrama	First Macedonian independent film.
Before the Rain	Milčo Mančevski	1994	Social	The first Macedonian film to be nominated for Academy Award.
Angel Waste	Dimitrie Osmanli	1995	Melodrama	
Self Destruction	Altanaj Erbil	1996	Comedy	
Gypsy Magic	Stole Popov	1997	Melodrama	It was Macedonia's submission to the 70th Academy Awards.
Over the Lake	Antonio Mitrikjeski	1997	Social	
Goodbye, 20th Century!	Darko Mitrevski	1998	Fantasy	It was Macedonia's submission to the 71st Academy Awards.
Maklabas	Aco Stankovski	1998	Experimental	

=== 2000s ===
Title	Director	Year	Genre	Notes
Dust	Milčo Mančevski	2001	Fiction	The film was nominated for a Golden Reel Award.
Like a Bad Dream	Antonio Mitrikjeski	2003	Fiction	
The Great Water	Ivo Trajkov	2004	Fiction	Macedonia's submission to the 77th Academy Awards.
Mirage	Svetozar Ristovski	2004	Drama	
How I Killed a Saint	Teona Strugar Mitevska	2004	Fiction	
Bal-Can-Can	Darko Mitrevski	2005	Fiction	The highest-grossing Macedonian film until the release of The Third Half. Entered into the 27th Moscow International Film Festival.
Contact	Sergej Stanojkovski	2005	Drama	Macedonia's submission to the 79th Academy Awards.
The Secret Book	Vlado Cvetanovski	2006	Conspiracy fiction	
Shadows	Milčo Mančevski	2007	Fiction	Macedonia's submission to the 80th Academy Awards.
I Am from Titov Veles	Teona Mitevska	2007	Fiction	
Upside Down	Igor Ivanov Izi	2007	Fiction	
Does It Hurt?	Aneta Lešnikovska	2007	Documentary	
Wingless	Ivo Trajkov	2009	Fiction	
East-West-East	Gerg Giovani	2009	Fiction	
Normal	Julius Ševčík	2009	Fiction	

=== 2010s ===
Title	Director	Year	Genre	Notes
Mothers	Milčo Mančevski	2010	Fiction	Macedonia's submission to the 83rd Academy Awards.
The War Is Over	Mitko Panov	2010	Drama	
My Father	Shqipe N. Duka	2010	Drama	First film in Albanian in Macedonia
The Land Between the Borders	Arben Kastrati	2010	Drama	
This Is Not an American Film	Sašo Pavlovski	2011	Crime	
Punk's Not Dead	Vladimir Blaževski	2011	Comedy	Macedonia's submission to the 84th Academy Awards.
The Third Half	Darko Mitrevski	2012	Historical	Macedonia's submission to the 85th Academy Awards.
The Woman Who Brushed Off Her Tears	Teona S. Mitevska	2012	Drama	
Skopje Remix	omnibus	2012	omnibus	
Balkan Is Not Dead	Aleksandar Popovski	2013	Drama	
The Piano Room	Igor Ivanov Izi	2013	Fiction	Released at the 2013 Manaki Brothers Film Festival.
Bale	Nikola Popovski	2014	Documentary	
Children of the Sun	Antonio Mitrikeski	2014	Drama	Released at the 2014 Manaki Brothers Film Festival
Inferno	Vinko Moderndorfer	2014	Drama	
Mizar: The Star of Hope	Marko Dzambazoski	2014	Documentary	
Sk	Guillermo Carreras-Candi	2014	Documentary	
These Are the Rules	Ognjen Sviličić	2014	Drama	
To the Hilt	Stole Popov	2014	Western	Released at the 2014 Manaki Brothers Film Festival, Macedonia's submission to the 87th Academy Awards
The Weight of Chains 2	Boris Malagurski	2014	Documentary	
When Clouds Burst	Guillermo Carreras-Candi	2014	Documentary	
My brother Lazar	Svetozar Ristovski	2015	Drama	Released at the 2015 Manaki Brothers Film Festival
Honey Night	Ivo Trajkov	2015	Political thriller	Released at the 2015 Skopje Film Festival
Three Days in September	Darijan Pejovski	2015	Thriller	Released at the 2015 Cinedays, Skopje
Waiting for the money	Slobodan Despotovski	2015	Drama	Released on 30 October 2015
Zbor	Slobodan Despotovski	2015	Drama	
Obozhenie	Kiril Karakaš	2016	Drama	
Amok	Vardan Tozija	2016	Drama, Thriller	Released on 30 April 2016
Horse Riders	Marjan Gavrilovski	2016	Drama, Thriller	Released May 2017
The liberation of Skopje	Rade Šerbedžija	2016	Historical	Released at the 2016 Manaki Brothers Film Festival
Golden Five	Goran Trenchovski	2016	Drama	Released at the 2016 Manaki Brothers Film Festival
When the Day Had No Name	Teona Strugar Mitevska	2017	Drama	
Oh my love	Kole Angelovski	2017	Comedy	Released at the 2017 Skopje Film Festival on 21 April 2017
Secret Ingredient	Gjorče Stavreski	2017	Drama, Comedy	
Witness	Mitko Panov	2018	Drama	expected premiere 2017
Year of the Monkey	Vladimir Blaževski	2018	Comedy, Fantasy	Released on 19 April 2018
Mocking of Christ	Jani Bojadzi	2018	Drama	expected premiere 2018

== Republic of North Macedonia ==
=== 2010s ===
Title	Director	Year	Genre	Notes
Happiness Effect	Borjan Zafirovski	2019	Drama	
God Exists, Her Name Is Petrunya	Teona Strugar Mitevska	2019	Drama	
Honeyland	Tamara Kotevska, Ljubomir Stefanov	2019	Documentary, Drama	Nominated for two Oscars

=== 2020s ===
Title	Director	Year	Genre	Notes
Ilija Dzadzev	Jordan Dukov	2020	Documentary, Biography	
Sisterhood	Dina Duma	2021	Drama	Sestri
The Happiest Man in the World	Teona Strugar Mitevska	2022	Drama	
Housekeeping for Beginners	Goran Stolevski	2023	Drama	
John Vardar vs the Galaxy	Goce Cvetanovski	2024	Space opera, Comedy, Adventure, Science fiction	First animated film produced in North Macedonia

== Macedonian co-produced ==
=== 1990s ===
Title	Director	Year	Genre	Notes
Cabaret Balkan	Goran Paskaljević	1998	Drama	Serbian

=== 2000s ===
Title	Director	Year	Genre	Notes
Odmazda	Jan Hintjens	2001	Drama, War	Macedonian, Dutch
Podgryavane na vcherashniya obed	Kostadin Bonev	2002	Drama	Bulgarian, Serbian
The Border Post	Rajko Grlić	2006	Comedy, Drama	Bosnian, Serbian, Croatian, Macedonian, Slovenian

=== 2010s ===
Title	Director	Year	Genre	Notes
Mission London	Dimitar Mitovski	2010	Comedy	Bulgarian, Russia, Serbian
Some Other Stories	Marija Džidževa	2010	Comedy, Drama, Romance	Croatian, Bosnian, Macedonian, Serbian
The Parade	Srđan Dragojević	2011	Comedy, Drama	Croatian, Bosnian, Albanian, Serbian
Monument to Michael Jackson	Darko Lungulov	2014	Comedy, Drama	Serbian
Šiška Deluxe	Jan Cvitkovič	2015	Comedy, Drama	Slovenian
The Golden Five	Goran Trenchovski	2016	Drama	Macedonian
Sieranevada	Cristi Puiu	2016	Comedy, Drama	Romanian
Nightlife	Damjan Kozole	2016	Crime, Drama, Mystery	Slovenia, Bosnia and Herzegovina
The Frog	Elmir Jukić	2017	Drama	Bosnia and Herzegovina
The Wild Pear Tree	Nuri Bilge Ceylan	2018	Drama	Turkish
Unforgettable Summer	Besnik Bisha	2019	Drama	Albanian
The Voice	Ognjen Sviličić	2019	Drama	Croatian, also known as Glas
Despite the Fog	Goran Paskaljević	2019	Drama	Italian, also known as Nonostante la nebbia

=== 2020s ===
Title	Director	Year	Genre	Notes
18% Grey	Viktor Chouchkov	2020	Drama	Bulgarian, German
Nezo	Merita Cocoli	2020	Documentary	Albanian

== Other films ==
- Bal-Can-Can (2005)
- Before the Rain (1994)
- Dust (2001)
- Frosina (1952)
- Goodbye, 20th Century! (1998)
- Gypsy Magic (1997)
- Macedonian Blood Wedding (1967)
- Mirage (2004)
- Miss Stone (1958)
- Shadows (2007)
- The Great Water (2004)
- The Secret Book (2006)
- The Solun Assassins (1963)
- The Third Half (2012)
