= List of Macedonian submissions for the Academy Award for Best International Feature Film =

Best International Feature Film submissions from North Macedonia

Highlights
- Debut: 1994
- Submissions: 22
- Nominations: 2
- Oscar winners: none

North Macedonia (Note: Formerly "Macedonia" from 1991 to 2019.) has submitted films for the Academy Award for Best International Feature Film (Note: The category was previously named the Academy Award for Best Foreign Language Film, but this was changed to the Academy Award for Best International Feature Film in April 2019, after the Academy deemed the word "Foreign" to be outdated.) since 1994. The International Feature Film award is handed out annually by the United States Academy of Motion Picture Arts and Sciences to a feature-length motion picture produced outside the United States that contains primarily non-English dialogue. It was not created until the 1956 Academy Awards, in which a competitive Academy Award of Merit, known as the Best Foreign Language Film Award, was created for non-English speaking films, and has been given annually since.

In 1991, the country attempted unsuccessfully to submit a film, while they were in the process of trying to achieve international recognition as an independent state. Prior to independence, Macedonian filmmakers were active participants in the Yugoslavian film industry, and several films made by Macedonian filmmakers were submitted for Oscar consideration as part of Yugoslavia. The last instance of this was Stole Popov's Happy New Year '49 in 1987.

As of 2026, North Macedonia has been nominated twice, for Before the Rain (1994) and Honeyland (2019).

Macedonian filmmaker Milcho Manchevski has had four of his films submitted

== Submissions ==
The Academy of Motion Picture Arts and Sciences has invited the film industries of various countries to submit their best film for the Academy Award for Best International Feature Film since 1956. The International Feature Film Committee oversees the process and reviews all the submitted films. Following this, they vote via secret ballot to determine the five nominees for the award.

Milcho Manchevski had four films selected to represent the country, the most for any filmmaker. Macedonian filmmakers Teona Strugar Mitevska and Tamara Kotevska had two films selected each.

Manchevski's Before the Rain (1994) was the country first nomination. Honeyland (2019) was the country second nomination, the film was also nominated for Best Documentary Feature.

Most of the submissions are mainly in Macedonian language, with the exception of Wingless (2009), which was in Czech, and The Happiest Man in the World (2022), which was in Bosnian. Below is a list of the films that have been submitted by North Macedonia for review by the Academy for the award by year and the respective Academy Awards ceremony.

Year (Ceremony)	Film title used in nomination	Original title	Language(s)	Director(s)	Result
1994 (67th)	Before the Rain	Пред дождот	Macedonian, Albanian, English	Milcho Manchevski	Nominated
1997 (70th)	Gypsy Magic	Џипси Меџик	Macedonian, Romani	Stole Popov	Not nominated
1998 (71st)	Goodbye, 20th Century!	Збогум на Дваесетиот Век!	Macedonian	Darko Mitrevski and Aleksandar Popovski	Not nominated
2004 (77th)	The Great Water	Γолемата Вода	Macedonian	Ivo Trajkov	Not nominated
2006 (79th)	Kontakt	Контакт	Macedonian, German	Sergej Stanojkovski	Not nominated
2007 (80th)	Shadows	Сенки	Macedonian	Milcho Manchevski	Not nominated
2008 (81st)	I'm From Titov Veles	Јас сум од Титов Велес	Macedonian	Teona Strugar Mitevska	Not nominated
2009 (82nd)	Wingless	Ocas ještěrky	Czech	Ivo Trajkov	Not nominated
2010 (83rd)	Mothers	Мајки	Macedonian	Milcho Manchevski	Not nominated
2011 (84th)	Punk's Not Dead	Панкот не е мртов	Macedonian, Albanian, Bosnian, Croatian	Vladimir Blazevski	Not nominated
2012 (85th)	The Third Half	Трето Полувреме	Macedonian	Darko Mitrevski	Not nominated
2014 (87th)	To the Hilt	До балчак	Macedonian	Stole Popov	Not nominated
2015 (88th)	Honey Night	Медена ноќ	Macedonian	Ivo Trajkov	Not nominated
2016 (89th)	The Liberation of Skopje	Ослободување на Скопје	Macedonian	Rade Šerbedžija and Danilo Šerbedžija	Not nominated
2018 (91st)	Secret Ingredient	Исцелител	Macedonian	Gjorce Stavreski	Not nominated
2019 (92nd)	Honeyland	Медена земја	Macedonian, Turkish, Bosnian	Tamara Kotevska and Ljubomir Stefanov	Nominated
2020 (93rd)	Willow	Врба	Macedonian	Milcho Manchevski	Not nominated
2021 (94th)	Sisterhood	Сестри	Macedonian	Dina Duma	Not nominated
2022 (95th)	The Happiest Man in the World	Најсреќниот човек на светот	Bosnian	Teona Strugar Mitevska	Not nominated
2023 (96th)	Housekeeping for Beginners	Домаќинство за почетници	Albanian, Macedonian, Romani	Goran Stolevski	Not nominated
2025 (98th)	The Tale of Silyan	Силјан	Macedonian	Tamara Kotevska	Not nominated
2026 (99th)	17		Macedonian	Kosara Mitić	Pending

== See also ==
- List of Yugoslav submissions for the Academy Award for Best Foreign Language Film
- List of Academy Award winners and nominees for Best International Feature Film
- List of Academy Award-winning foreign language films
