= Pece Trajkovski – Brada =

Macedonian musician (born 1981)

Pece Trajkovski - Brada
- Born: 1981 (age 44–45); Bitola, Yugoslavia
- Genres: Alternative indie, world music, theatre, movie
- Occupation: Musician
- Instruments: Accordion, guitar, keys & percussion
- Years active: 1995–present
- Website: www.facebook.com/pbrada

Pece Trajkovski – Brada (born May 27, 1981, in Bitola, Macedonia, Yugoslavia) is a Macedonian musician. He is the co-founder and lead accordion, guitar, and synth player of the band Foltin (Macedonian: Фолтин) since 1999. As a Foltin member, he has worked on ten studio albums, music for over 20 theater pieces, and several film scores.

== Discography ==
- Donkey Hot (2003)
- Lo-Lee-Taa-Too (2005)
- Ovaa Transplantirana masina za čukanje dosega ne tipkala ljubovno pismo (2008)
- Penelope X (2011; joint project with Nikola Kodjabashija and Goce Stefkovski)
- Antitelo (2012)
- Pijan Slavej (2015)
- MOMÓMA (2019)
- Honeyland Suite (2020)
- Theatre Miniatures (2020)
- Simultan Baknezh (2021)

== Theatre ==
- 2022 - Decameron, directed by Martin Kocovski, National Theater Voydan Chernodrinski, Prilep, Macedonia
- 2019 – Arabian Night, directed by Zoja Buzalkovska, National Theater Voydan Chernodrinski, Prilep, Macedonia
- 2017 – Les Misérables, directed by Martin Kocovski, National Theater 'Voydan Chernodrinski', Prilep, Macedonia
- 2015 – Lepa Vida, directed by Miha Nemec, SNG Nova Gorica, SSG Trieste, PG Kranj, Slovenia
- 2015 – The Good Person of Szachwan, directed by Aleksandar Popovski, MGL, Ljubljana, Slovenia
- 2014 – Živio Harms, Čuda Postoje, directed by Aleksandar Popovski, Kerempuh, Zagreb, Croatia
- 2013 – Schweik in the Second World War, directed by Martin Kocovski, National Theater Voydan Chernodrinski, Prilep, Macedonia
- 2013 – Misterij Buffo, directed by Aleksandar Popovski, SNG Drama, Ljubljana, Slovenia
- 2012 – Odysseus, directed by Aleksandar Popovski, Ulysses Theatre, Brijuni, Croatia
- 2012 – Spring Awakening, directed by Martin Kocovski, Народно Позориште, Uzice, Serbia
- 2011 – Leksikon of Yu Mitology, directed by Oliver Frljic, NETA
- 2011 – Baal, directed by Martin Kocovski, Dramski Theater, Skopje, Macedonia
- 2010 – Cirkus Destetika, directed by Aleksandar Popovski, HNK Rijeka, Croatia
- 2010 – Caucasian Chalk Circle, directed by Martin Kocovski, National Theater 'Voydan Chernodrinski', Prilep, Macedonia
- 2010 – Peer Gynt, directed by Aleksandar Popovski, Gavella, Zagreb, Croatia
- 2009 – Boat for Dolls, directed by Aleksandar Popovski, SNG Drama, Ljubljana, Slovenia
- 2009 – Swan Song, directed by Branko Stavrev, Dramski Theater, Skopje, Macedonia
- 2009 – The Other Side, directed by Martin Kocovski, NETA
- 2008 – Drums in the Night, directed by Martin Kocovski, National Theater Voydan Chernodrinski, Prilep, Macedonia
- 2002 – Family Stories, directed by Aleksandra Kovacevic, National Theater of Bitola, Macedonia
- 2002 – Don Quixote in a Dutch Discoteque, directed by Sasho Milenkovski, National Theater of Kumanovo, Macedonia
- 2001 – Bakhi, directed by Sasho Milenkovski, National Theater of Bitola, Macedonia
- 2001 – Comme Moi Le Piaf, directed by Natasha Poplavska. National Theater of Bitola, Macedonia
- 2001 – Macedoine, Odyssey 2001, directed by Ivan Popovski, Ohrid Summer, Ohrid, Macedonia
- 1999 – Macedonian Blood Wedding, directed by Ljupcho Georgievski, National Theater of Bitola, Macedonia

== Film music ==
- 2019 - Honeyland (score), directed by Ljubomir Stefanovski and Tamara Kotevska (won three awards at the 2019 Sundance Film Festival plus 27 other international wins and 38 nominations; nominated for Best Documentary and Best International Feature Film at the 92nd Academy Awards)
- 2017 - Secret Ingredient (score), directed by Gjorce Stavreski (won international festival awards and 26 nominations)
- 2017 - Lake of Apples (score), directed by Ljubomir Stefanovski
- 2017 - Avec L'Amoure (score), directed by Ilija Cvetkovski
- 2016 - The Liberation of Skopje (actor/musician), directed by Danilo and Rade Sherbedzija
- 2014 - To the Hilt (as instrumentalist), directed by Stole Popov
- 2012 – The Balkan is Not Dead (as actor), directed by Aleksandar Popovski, production: Kino Oko
- 2010 – This Is Not An American Movie (score) directed by Sasho Pavlovski, production by Dejan Iliev
- 2008 – Cash and Marry (score) directed by Atanas Georgiev, production by Mischief Films, Nukleus, Tris Films and ITVS International
- 2008 – Dance With Me (soundtrack), directed by Sasha A. Damjanovski, production by Orev films
- 2005 – Turkish Tea (documentary soundtrack), directed by Petra Seliskar, production by Petra Pan, Slovenia
