= Cinema of North Macedonia =

- No. of screens: 18 (2009)
  - Per capita: 0.9 per 100,000 (2009)

Produced feature films (2010)
- Fictional: 4
- Animated: -
- Documentary: -

Number of admissions (2011)
- Total: 119,575
- National films: 24,986 (20.9%)

Cinema of North Macedonia refers to film industry based in North Macedonia or any motion-picture made by Macedonians abroad. Janaki and Milton Manaki are considered the founding fathers. The first feature film produced by the country was Frosina (1952) and the most famous director is Milčo Mančevski. The first and only Macedonian movie theater chain is Kinoverzum.

Throughout the past century, the medium of film has depicted the history, culture and everyday life of the people of North Macedonia. Over the years many Macedonian films have been presented at film festivals around the world and several of these films have won prestigious awards. Two Macedonian films have been nominated for an Academy Award, namely Before the Rain (1994) and Honeyland (2019).

== Early period ==
The first film to be produced on the territory of the present-day country was made in 1895 by Janaki and Milton Manaki in Bitola, who are today considered the founding fathers of the cinema. The country's cinema was mainly developed in the decades following World War II. In 1947, the film agency Film Skopje and the production company Vardar Film were established.

The first Macedonian feature film was Frosina, released in 1952 and directed by Vojislav Nanović. The screenplay was written by Vlado Maleski, who wrote the lyrics for the country's national anthem. The first feature film in colour was Miss Stone, a movie about a Protestant missionary in Ottoman Macedonia. It was released in 1958.

== Contemporary period ==
Milčo Mančevski, Macedonian director

The most famous Macedonian director is Milčo Mančevski, whose debut feature film Before the Rain was nominated for an Academy Award. The highest-grossing feature film in North Macedonia was Bal-Can-Can, having been seen by over 500,000 people in its first year alone.

In 2019, the documentary Honeyland, directed by Tamara Kotevska and Ljubomir Stefanov, received stellar reviews and universal acclaim from contemporary film critics. It was nominated in the categories for Best International Feature Film and Best Documentary Feature at the 92nd Academy Awards, making it the first non-fictional film to receive a nomination in both categories and the country's second nomination at the Academy Awards since 1994. The documentary earned numerous other awards and nominations at international documentary and film awards, including three prizes at the 2019 Sundance Film Festival where it was the most awarded film that year. The country now produces three or four films per year.

== See also ==
- List of films from North Macedonia
- Cinema of the world
