= Foltin =

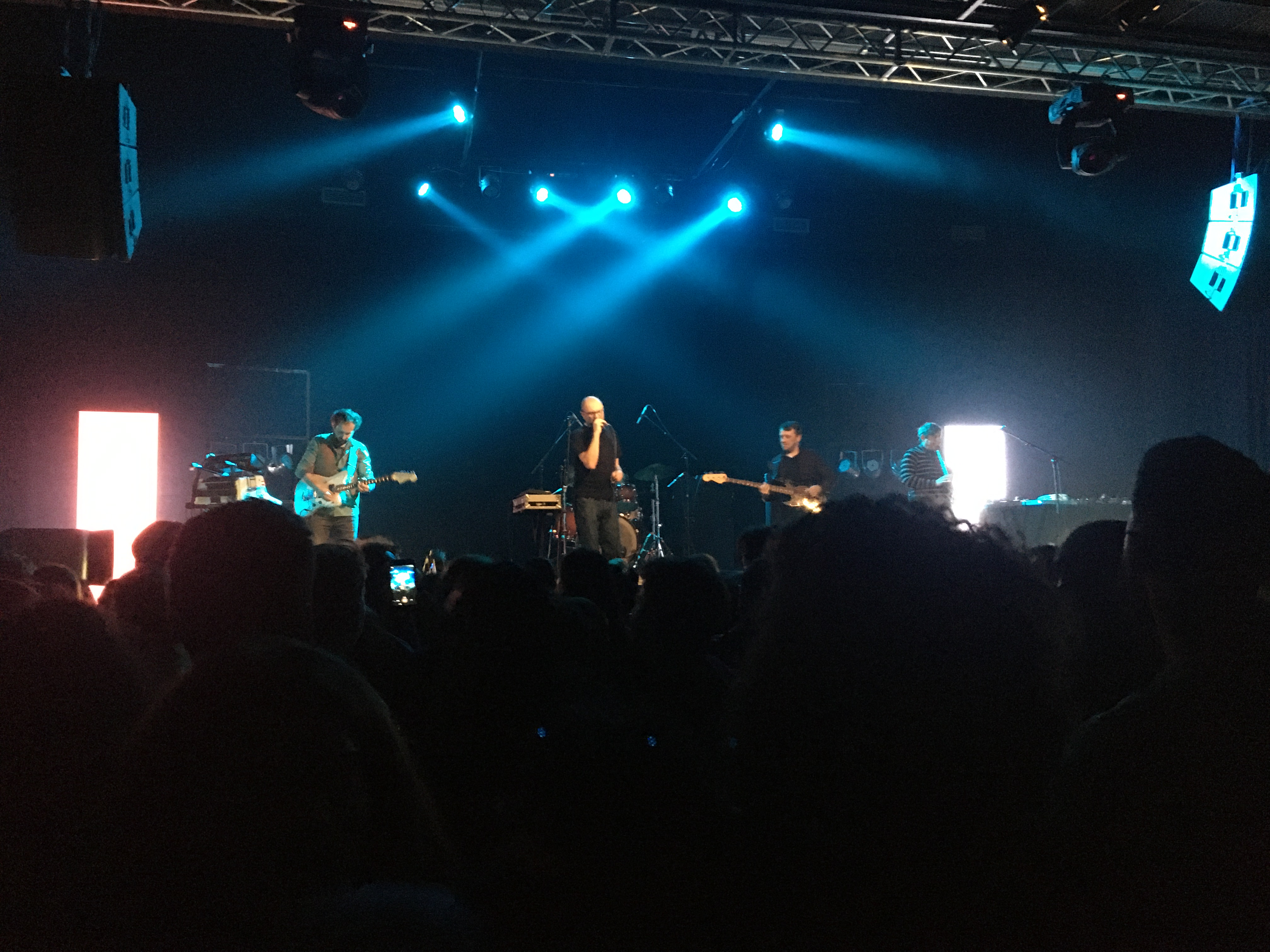
- Foltin performing live in Skopje on 14 February 2020

Background information
- Origin: Bitola, North Macedonia
- Genres: Art pop, indie rock, world music, electro acoustic, alternative rock, Balkan music, experimental
- Years active: 1995–present
- Website: https://www.facebook.com/foltin.band/

Foltin (Macedonian: Фолтин) is a Macedonian band active since 1995. Their name comes from Karel Čapek's last novel Life and Work of the Composer Foltýn.

Their music is a blend of many genres including indie, alternative, world music, funk, electroacoustic, and jazz Foltin's live performances are theatrical and in a "pseudo-immigrant" cabaret style. Journalist Nenad Georgievski describes their music as gravity defying and "dynamic, full of surprises, and humorous—and they blend all sorts of influences together: jazz, improv music, funk, bossa nova, chalgia, klezmer, ambient, and film music." Although rooted in jazz, he states, their music "is not strictly jazz per se, as Foltin frequently blur genre lines, experimenting with a variety of styles and sounds." Singer Branislav Nikolov in a 2009 claimed that his mayor musical influences were Björk, Johnny Cash and Tom Waits.

They have also worked on theatre and film music productions since 1998/1999, including the score for the 92nd Academy Awards for Best International Feature Film and Sundance 2019 awards winner Honeyland. The lyrics of the band's first three albums are a mixture of phonetic imitations of languages including Macedonian, Spanish, French, Romanian, and Portuguese. Over the years, it became a blend of Macedonian and English.

The band has appeared at music and theatre festivals in Macedonia, Croatia, Italy, Austria, Slovenia, Serbia, Bosnia and Herzegovina, Montenegro, Albania, Bulgaria, Hungary, Belgium, England, Germany, Russia, Lebanon, Turkey, the Netherlands, and France.

== Band members ==
- Pece Nikolovski - clarinet, harmonica, percussion, effects
- Branislav Nikolov - voice, guitar
- Pece Trajkovski - Brada - guitar, accordion, keys and percussion
- Goce Jovanoski - bass
- Slavco Jovev - drums
- Marjan Stanic - percussion

== Discography ==
- Outre-Mer (1997)
- Archimed (2000)
- Donkey Hot (2003)
- Lo-Lee-Taa-Too (2005)
- Ova Transplantirana masina za čukanje dosega ne tipkala ljubovno pismo (2008)
- Penelope X (2011) - joint project with Goce Stevkovski, Emin Dzijan & Nikola Kodjabashia
- Antitelo (2012)
- Pijan slavej (2015)
- МОМÓМА (2019)
- Theatre Miniatures (2020)
- Simultan Baknezh (2021)

== Theater music ==
- 2018 – Arabian Night, directed by Zoja Buzalkovska, National Theater 'Voydan Chernodrinski', Prilep, Macedonia
- 2017 – Les Misérables, directed by Martin Kocovski, National Theater 'Voydan Chernodrinski', Prilep, Macedonia
- 2015 – Lepa Vida, directed by Miha Nemec, SNG Nova Gorica, SSG Trieste, PG Kranj, Slovenija
- 2015 – The Good Person of Szechwan, directed by Aleksandar Popovski, MGL, Ljubljana, Slovenija
- 2014 – Živio Harms, Čuda Postoje, directed by Aleksandar Popovski, Kerempuh, Zagreb, Croatia
- 2013 – Schweik in the Second World War, directed byMartin Kocovski, National Theater 'Voydan Chernodrinski', Prilep, Macedonia
- 2013 – Misterij Buffo, directed by Aleksandar Popovski, SNG Drama, Ljubljana, Slovenia
- 2012 – Ulysses, directed by Aleksandar Popovski, Ulysses Theatre, Brioni, Croatia
- 2012 – Spring Awakening, directed by Martin Kocovski, Народно Позориште, Uzice, Serbia
- 2011 – Leksikon of Yu Mitology, directed by Oliver Frljic, NETA
- 2011 – Baal, directed by Martin Kocovski, Dramski Theater, Skopje, Macedonia
- 2010 – Cirkus Destetika, directed by Aleksandar Popovski, HNK Rijeka, Croatia
- 2010 – Causasian Chalk Circle, directed by Martin Kocovski, National Theater Voydan Chernodrinski, Prilep, Macedonia
- 2010 – Peer Gynt, directed by Aleksandar Popovski, Gavella, Zagreb, Croatia
- 2009 – Boat for Dolls, directed by Aleksandar Popovski, SNG Drama, Ljubljana, Slovenia
- 2009 – Swan Song, directed by Branko Stavrev, Dramski Theater, Skopje, Macedonia
- 2009 – The Other Side, directed by Martin Kocovski, Neta
- 2008 – Drums in the Night, directed by Martin Kocovski, National Theater Voydan Chernodrinski, Prilep, Macedonia
- 2002 – Family Stories, directed by Aleksandra Kovacevic, National Theater of Bitola, Macedonia
- 2002 – Don Quixote in a Dutch Discoteque, directed by Sasho Milenkovski, National Theater of Kumanovo, Macedonia
- 2001 – Bakhi, directed by Sasho Milenkovski, National Theater of Bitola, Macedonia
- 2001 – Comme Moi Le Piaf, directed by Natasha Poplavska, National Theater of Bitola, Macedonia
- 2001 – Macedoine, Odyssey 2001, directed by Ivan Popovski, Ohrid Summer, Ohrid, Macedonia
- 1999 – Macedonian Blood Wedding, directed by Ljupcho Georgievski, National Theater of Bitola, Macedonia

== Film soundtracks ==
- 1998 – By Foltin, directed by Ljubcho Bilbilovski
- 2001 – Se Javi!, directed by Jane Altiparmakov
- 2002 - Okno (short), directed by Petra Seliskar
- 2005 – Turkish Tea (documentary), directed by Petra Seliskar
- 2008 – Dance With Me, directed by Sasha A. Damjanovski
- 2008 – Cash and Marry, directed by Atanas Georgiev
- 2010 – This is Not an American Movie, directed by Sasho Pavlovski
- 2012 – The Balkan is Not Dead (actors), directed by Aleksandar Popovski
- 2016 - Lake of Apples, directed by Lubomir Stefanovski
- 2017 - Secret Ingredient, directed by Gjorce Stavreski
- 2017 - Avec L'amoure, directed by Ilija Cvetkovski
- 2019 - Honeyland, directed by Ljubomir Stefanovski and Tamara Kotevska
