= Apostol Trpeski =

Macedonian cinematographer (born 1948)

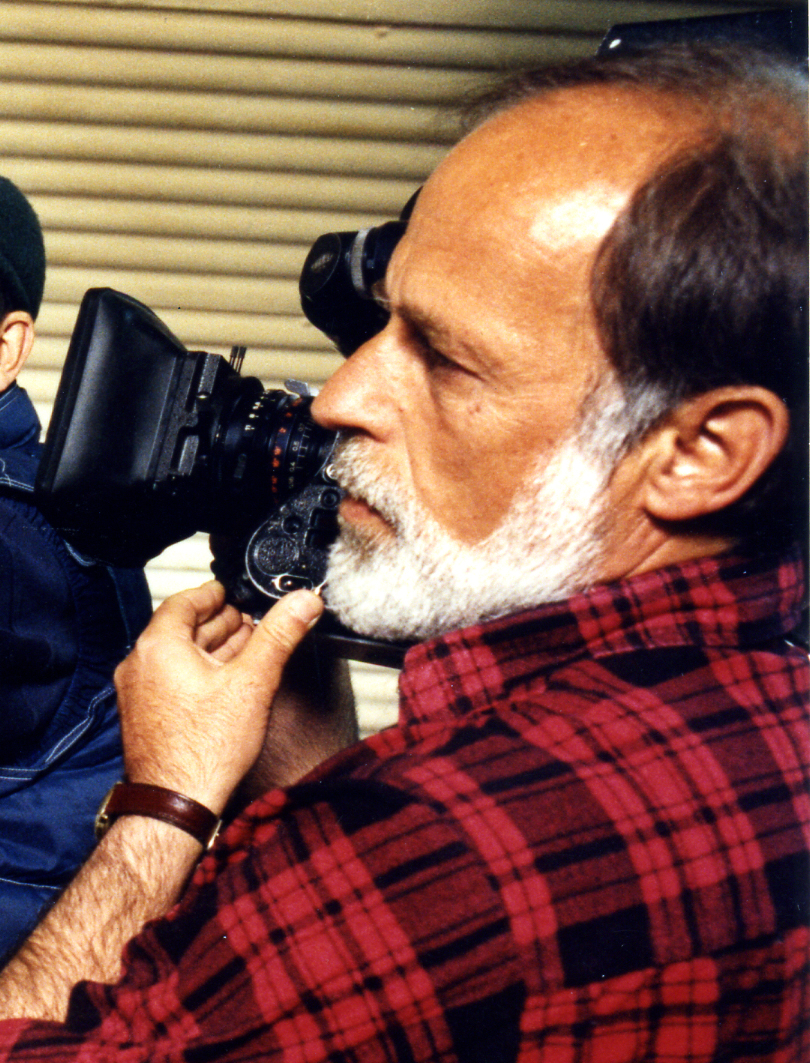
- Born: Apostol Trpeski; 6 September 1948 (age 76); Tetovo, SR Macedonia, SFR Yugoslavia
- Occupation: Cinematographer
- Years active: 1971 – present

Apostol Trpeski (Macedonian: Aпостол Трпески, 6 September 1948) is a Macedonian cinematographer.

== Biography ==
Trpeski was born on 6 September 1948, in Tetovo, SFR Yugoslavia (today North Macedonia). He graduated from the Academy for theater, film and television art – Cinematography Department at the University of Zagreb, Croatia.

== Career background ==
From 1971 until 1992, he worked at the Macedonian National Television as a cinematographer and director of photography. He shot many series and TV shows of different genres, made about a hundred reportages, many documentary films and TV movies and about a hundred more music shows, series and music and commercial videos, using all kinds of technologies.

Since 1992, he has been working as a professor and Head of the Film and TV Camera Department at Ss. Cyril and Methodius University Faculty of Dramatic Arts in Skopje. He was vice-dean of the Faculty of Dramatic Arts for ten years.

He is a member of the Macedonian Film Professionals Association and a member of the Council of the International Cinematographers Film Festival "Manaki brothers". He was a member of the Senate of the Ss. Cyril and Methodius University and of the Broadcasting Council of the Republic of Macedonia. He was chairman of the board of the Macedonian Film Fund.

He is the author of the book Film and TV camera, book 1 - basis of the cinematography techniques (2000).

He has been awarded many prizes for his work.

== Films ==
=== As focus puller ===
- 1984: Did I not tell you (Нели ти реков)

=== As director of photography ===
- 1993: Wonderful World, segment of the first Macedonian omnibus "Light Grey" (Светло сиво)
- 1997: Gypsy Magic
- 2002: Heart of the Stone (Каменот тежи на своето место)
- 2002: Slander (Клевета)
- 2003: A Step ahead the time (Чекор пред времето)
- 2003: When the master of language (Кај мајсторот јазичар)
- 2004: Under
- 2006: Navi
- 2007: Temptation (Искушение)
- 2009: Confusion (Бунило)
- 2014: To the Hilt (До балчак)
- 2016: Golden Five (Златна петорка)
- 2016: Love and Betrayal (Љубов и предавство) (TV series)
- 2018: The Red Poet (Црвениот поет) (10 episodes)

=== As cinematographer ===
- 2001: Holly Liturgy of St. John Chrysostom (Божествена Литургија на Св. Јован Златоуст) (documentary film)
