= Toni Mihajlovski =

Macedonian actor

- Тони Михајловски
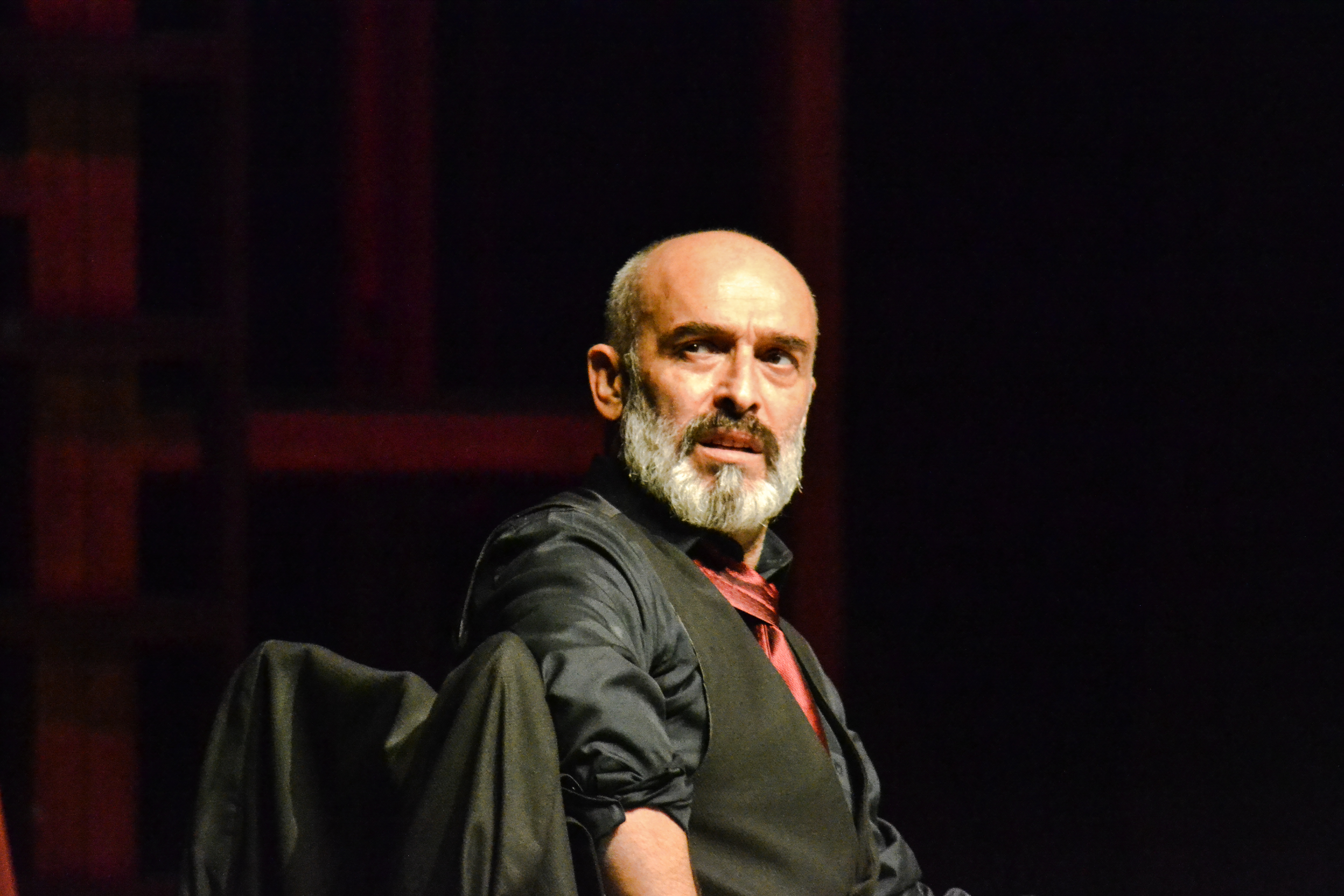
- Mihajlovski in 2019
- Born: 1 July 1967 (age 59); Kumanovo, SR Macedonia, SFR Yugoslavia
- Education: Faculty of Dramatic Arts
- Alma mater: Ss. Cyril and Methodius University in Skopje
- Occupations: Actor, stand-up comedian
- Military career
- Allegiance: Macedonia
- Branch: Ministry of Internal Affairs
- Service years: 2001–2004
- Unit: Lions
- Commands: Spokesman
- Conflicts: Insurgency in the Republic of Macedonia

Toni Mihajlovski (Macedonian: Тони Михајловски; born 1 July 1967) is a Macedonian theater, motion picture and television actor, stand up comedian, presenter and showman.

== Life ==
Mihajlovski was born in Kumanovo, Yugoslavia on the 1st of July, 1967. After completing The Faculty of Arts in Skopje at the Ss. Cyril and Methodius University in Skopje he became a member of the drama section in the Macedonian National Theater in 1994. During the 5th annual "JoakimInterFest" in 2010 which took place in Kragujevac, Serbia, he received the award for best actor

== Filmography ==
- 1996: Selfdestruction (supporting role)
- 1997: Gypsy Magic (leading role)
- 1998: Cabaret Balkan (leading role)
- 1998: Goodbye, 20th Century! (leading role)
- 2000: Tunel (supporting role)
- 2003: One of the Faces of Death (supporting role)
- 2003: Seven Stories about Love and Endings (supporting role)
- 2004: Bal-Can-Can (leading role)
- 2004: How I killed a Saint (supporting role)
- 2011: Punk's Not Dead (leading role)
- 2011: Parade (supporting role)
- 2012: The Third Half (leading role)
- 2014: Monument to Michael Jackson (leading role)
- 2014: To the Hilt (leading role)
- 2015: We Will Be the World Champions (supporting role)
- 2026: One More Game (supporting role)
