= Under the Same Sky (disambiguation) =

Under the Same Sky is a 1964 Yugoslavian film directed by Ljubisha Georgievski.

Under the Same Sky may also refer to:

- "Under the Same Sky", a song on the CD version of the single Love Paradox by American singer Leah Dizon
- Under the Same Sky, the slogan of the Eurovision Song Contest 2004

== See also ==
- The Same Sky (disambiguation)
