= Vlado Jovanovski =

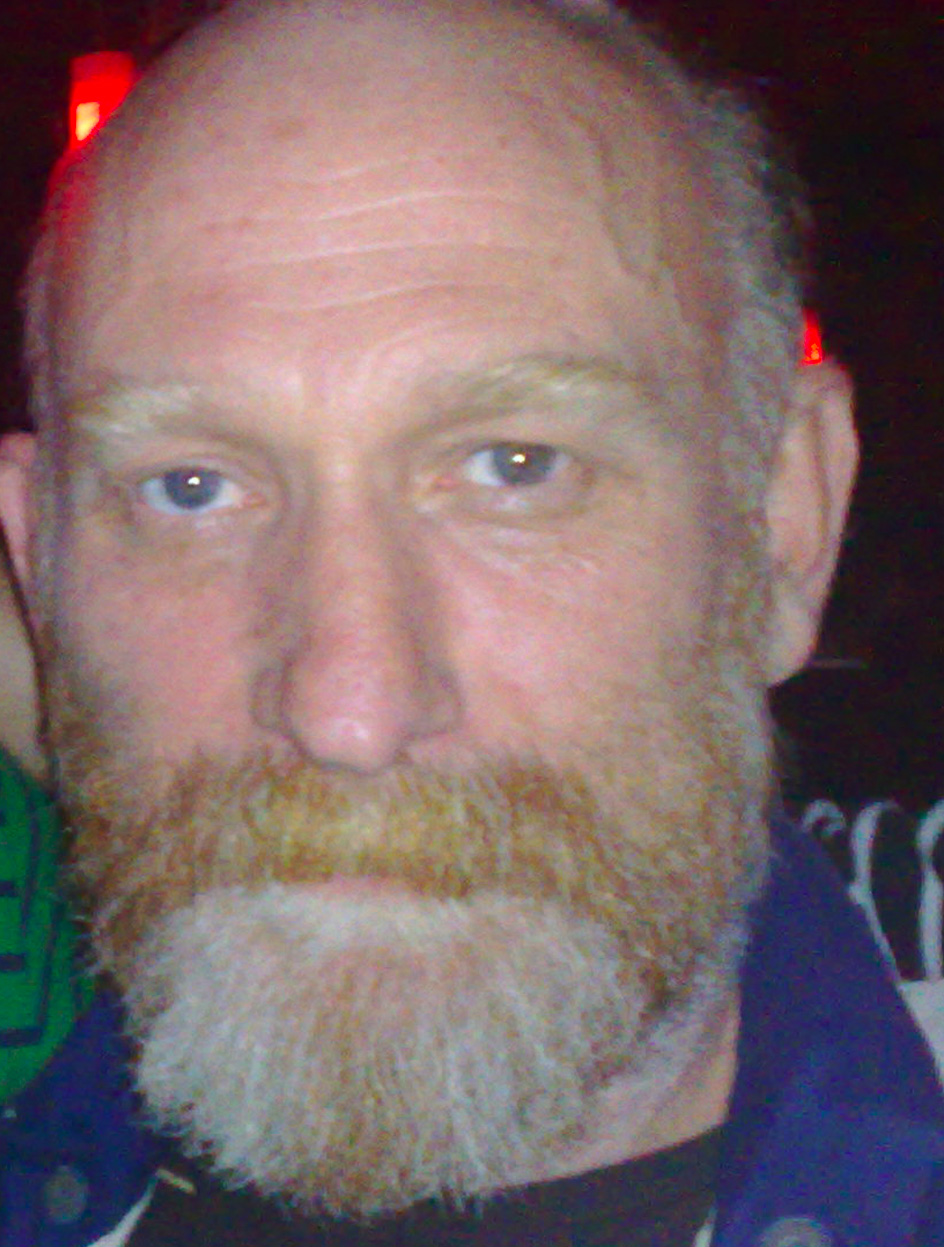
- Born: 27 February 1967 (age 59); Probištip, Macedonia, Yugoslavia
- Occupation: Actor
- Years active: 1992–present

Vlado Jovanovski (Macedonian: Владо Јовановски; born 27 February 1967) is a Macedonian actor. His film credits include principal roles in prominent Macedonian films such as Bal-Can-Can and Mirage.

== Filmography ==
- Slovenski Orfej (1992) (TV)
- Svetlo sivo (1993)
- Makedonska saga (1993)
- Angeli na otpad (1995)
- Preku ezeroto (1997)
- Goodbye, 20th Century! (1998)
- Veta (2001)
- Dust (2001)
- The Great Water (2004)
- Mirage (2004)
- Bal-Can-Can (2005)
- The Secret Book (2006)
- Time of the Comet (2008)
- Kolona (2011)
- The Third Half (2012)
- To the Hilt (2014)
- Lazar (2015)
- Osloboduvanje na Skopje (2016)
- Prespav (television series, 2016–2023)
- Ruganje so Hristos (2018)
- Snezana umira na krajot (2022)
- Bistra voda (2022-2023)
- Branilac (2023)
