= Black seed =

Black seed may refer to:

- Nigella sativa, a plant with stubby, 2mm seeds
- Guizotia abyssinica, a plant with elongate, 5mm seeds
- Black Seed (EP), an EP by black metal band Nazxul
- Black Seed (film), a 1971 film
- The Black Seeds, a reggae inspired musical group from Wellington, New Zealand
