= Days of Dreams =

1980 film

- Directed by: Vlatko Gilić
- Written by: Vlatko Gilić
- Starring: Vladislava Milosavljević
- Cinematography: Branko Ivatović
- Edited by: Katarina Stojanović
- Music by: Ksenija Zečević
- Release date: 20 February 1980
- Running time: 106 minutes
- Country: Yugoslavia
- Language: Serbo-Croatian

Days of Dreams (Serbian: Дани од снова, translit. Dani od snova) is a 1980 Yugoslav drama film directed by Vlatko Gilić. It competed in the Un Certain Regard section at the 1980 Cannes Film Festival.

== Cast ==
- Vladislava Milosavljević
- Boris Komnenić
- Ljiljana Krstić
- Svetozar Cvetković
