= Mirage (2004 film) =

- US movie poster of Mirage
- Directed by: Svetozar Ristovski
- Written by: Svetozar Ristovski; Grace Lea Troje
- Produced by: Svetozar Ristovski; Harold Lee Tichenor
- Starring: Vlado Jovanovski; Mustafa Nadarević; Nikola Đuričko; Dejan Aćimović; Marko Kovačević
- Cinematography: Vladimir Samoilovski
- Edited by: Atanas Georgiev
- Music by: Klaus Hundsbichler
- Distributed by: Crescent Releasing; Picture This! (US)
- Release dates: 11 September 2004 (Toronto International Film Festival); 11 March 2005 (Macedonia)
- Running time: 107 minutes
- Country: Macedonia
- Languages: Macedonian; Albanian

Mirage (Macedonian: Илузија; transliterated Iluzija) is a 2004 Macedonian drama film starring Vlado Jovanovski, Mustafa Nadarević, Nikola Đuričko, and Dejan Aćimović, with Marko Kovačević debuting in its lead role. It was directed by Svetozar Ristovski, who co-wrote the film with Grace Lea Troje. Taking place in the city of Veles, the film is a coming-of-age story about a talented but abused schoolboy who is betrayed by illusory hopes of a better future and transformed by harsh circumstances into a criminal. It offers a grim depiction of post-independence Macedonia, portraying it as a site of violence and corruption.

Mirage was Ristovski's feature debut as a director. Following its release in Canada and the United States, it was well-received by most critics, who have generally praised the film for its uncompromising realism and lead actor's performance. It won Best Feature Film during the 2005 Anchorage International Film Festival and was nominated for the Tokyo Grand Prix during the 2004 Tokyo International Film Festival.

== Synopsis ==
The film takes place in Veles during the Republic of Macedonia's post-independence years. It tells the story of 13-year-old Marko Trifunovski (Marko Kovacevic), a talented but abused Macedonian schoolboy whose harsh circumstances gradually transform him into a criminal. Two mentors offer Marko hopes of a better future, but they eventually fail him, leading to his catastrophic change. The illusory nature of these hopes is foreshadowed by the film's epigraph, an aphorism from Friedrich Nietzsche's Human, All Too Human: "Hope is the worst of evils, for it prolongs the torments of man."

The film opens with Marko's difficult circumstances. Living in a run-down house beside a railway track, he suffers neglect from his family. They consist of his father Lazo (Vlado Jovanovski), a drunkard addicted to bingo and involved in a workers' strike; his cowed, unsupportive mother Angja (Elena Mosevska); and his promiscuous, abusive sister Fanny (Slavica Manaskova). At school, Marko suffers torment from bullies led by Levi (Martin Jovchevski), son of the Albanian police chief Blashko (Dejan Acimovic). To escape his troubles, Marko often takes refuge in a local train graveyard, playing chess to pass time.

A sensitive boy, Marko has a talent for composing poetry; a character half-jokingly refers to him as "Kočo Racin II". A Bosnian teacher of Macedonian (Mustafa Nadarevic) becomes Marko's mentor. He encourages Marko to take part in a French-sponsored poetry contest whose winners will represent Macedonia in Paris, as well as to recite his entry during their school's upcoming Independence Day celebrations. He fills Marko with hopes of escaping his hometown through literary achievement to Paris, the "city of art".

However, Marko's efforts gain only indifference from his family and mockery from school bullies. Although a kind man, his teacher offers little help. He flees when he witnesses Levi's gang beating up Marko outside his own apartment, and his attempts to banish Levi from his classes fail because of Blashko's intervention. Furthermore, Fanny begins an affair with a black Kosovo Force soldier, providing Marko's racist bullies with more fuel.

Meanwhile, a scarred soldier (Nikola Djuricko) has taken up residence in the train graveyard. He plays chess with Marko, replacing a missing pawn with a bullet. Coincidentally, his name turns out to be Paris, the city of Marko's hopes. Paris becomes Marko's new mentor, teaching the boy to fend for himself: "Eat or be eaten." He promises to take Marko away from his hometown in the future. Under Paris' influence, Marko begins to drink, smoke, and steal. They commit several burglaries to fund their future journey, including one of a local Orthodox church.

Marko is eventually caught peddling stolen perfumes. Taken into police custody, he is blackmailed by Blashko into becoming Levi's tutor. Levi in turn blackmails Marko into joining his gang for a school break-in, threatening him with his father's gun. Meanwhile, Marko's teacher subjects his poetry to severe criticism, devastating the boy. At his wits' end, Marko begs Paris to teach him how to shoot a gun. Dismissive at first, Paris finally agrees.

At night, Levi's gang and Marko break into school. They vandalize its main office, setting student records on fire and locking Marko inside the burning room. Scarred in the face by a broken bottle and recognized by the night watchman, Marko escapes and seeks refuge in the train graveyard. There, he discovers that Paris has abandoned him, leaving behind his pawn bullet.

Summoned by the principal to account for the vandalism, Marko refuses to denounce Levi's gang. He is condemned as a delinquent and expelled from school. Marko's teacher offers him no help, instead reporting him for alcohol and tobacco abuse. He replaces Marko with classmate Jasmina (Marija Sikalovska) for their Independence Day poetry recital, ghostwriting a patriotic poem for her.

Confronting Levi's gang, Marko takes away Levi's gun by force and loads it with Paris' bullet. Armed, he confronts his teacher during their school's Independence Day celebrations and denounces him for betraying his hopes. "There is no escape from the sewer," he concludes, shooting his teacher point-blank. As the boy staggers away, the film lingers on a close-up of his teacher's corpse, closing to the strains of Erik Satie's Gnossienne No. 3.

== Cast ==
In order given by the film's credits: Svetozar Ristovski conceived of Marko's personality as a combination of outward fragility and inner toughness, choosing Kovacevic for his ability to project these dual qualities.

- Jordanco Cevrevski as Neighbor. He appears in the film's opening, quarreling with Lazo for disturbing the neighbourhood with his drunken antics.
- Elena Mosevska as Angja. Marko's mother.
- Slavica Manaskova as Fanny. Marko's sister.
- Mustafa Nadarevic as Bosnian Teacher.
- Martin Jovchevski as Levi. Blashko's son.
- Nikola Hejko as Chernobyl. He appears as one of Lazo's cronies. Hejko was also casting director for the film.
- Marija Sikalovska as Jasmina.
- Dejan Acimovic as Blashko. Levi's father.
- Petar Mircevski as Policeman. He appears as one of Blashko's assistants.
- Andrijana Ristovska as Bingo Announcer. She appears in Lazo's bingo scenes. When a man takes over her task in one of these scenes, the bingo parlour responds with derision to her replacement.
- Nikola Djuricko as Paris. Ristovski intended the film to be ambiguous about Paris' existence, depicting him as a fictitious creation of Marko's escapist daydreams, but refusing to deny his existence by separating Marko's dreams and reality. Djuricko prepared for his role as Paris by weight-training for a month and learning Macedonian.
- Salaetin Bilal as Jeweller. He appears as a buyer for Marko's stolen jewellery.
- Tome Angelovski, Grace Lea Troje, Dejan Boskov as KFOR Soldiers. They appear as customers in a cafe where Marko is peddling stolen perfumes. Troje was also co-writer with Ristovski for the film, while Angelovski and Boskov were location managers.
- Alexandar Georgiev as Night Watchman.
- Bajrush Mjaku as Principal.

== Major themes ==
Svetozar Ristovski intended the film to be a coming-of-age story about a boy's transition from childhood to adolescence in contemporary Macedonia. As part of this coming-of-age process, the protagonist Marko spends much of the film searching for paternal figures such as Paris and his teacher to compensate for his father's inadequacies and become alternative role models for him. The mysterious Paris, in particular, functions as a wish-fulfilment "mirage" for Marko.

Ristovski also intended the film to portray social conditions in post-independence Macedonia, depicting it as a society plagued by anomie, violence and corruption. He saw these conditions as part of a larger regional unease whose history included civil conflict in former Yugoslav territories. Critics have similarly interpreted the film as an allegory of these social and regional concerns. In this context, Marko's transition from victimhood to criminality embodies the cycle of violence endemic in such conditions, while his failed hopes serve as a cautionary warning against the dangers of empty idealism in such situations. One critic saw Paris' bullet in Marko's chess set (see figure on the right) as a metaphor for the threat of violence ever-present in their world.

[The film contains much train imagery, depicting the city of Veles as a railway setting. According to Ristovski, this railway motif was incorporated into the film for visual and dramatic reasons. In the latter case, it embodies a predicament in which the railway stands for Macedonia's geographical status as an important regional crossroads, but in which opportunities offered by this status are simultaneously hindered by extensive travel restrictions during Macedonia's post-independence years. Ristovski saw Marko's story as a dramatization of that predicament: "[Many people] see these trains that are going up and down, but they can't get on any of those trains. They can't really get out of their place, their country, their town." One critic saw Marko's train graveyard (see figure on the left) as a metaphor for the hopelessness of his particular story: "there are tracks everywhere but no hope of transport."

== Production ==
Mirage was Svetozar Ristovski's first attempt at directing a feature film; his prior work included the short film Hunter (2000) and the documentary Joy of Life (2001). According to a 2006 WKCR interview, his idea for the project came in the form of visual imagery for the film's final shot (see figure on the right), which served as a focal point towards which he worked out the rest of the film's events.

Ristovski collaborated with Grace Lea Troje on the script. He credited his Canadian-born colleague with providing the film an "international" perspective and giving its story a more "universal" dimension, thus steering it away from parochialism. According to Variety, Andrei Tarkovsky's Ivan's Childhood (1962) was an important influence on the co-writers.

The casting director for the film was Nikola Hejko, who was chosen primarily for his prior work with juvenile actors in movies such as Kolya (1996) and The Great Water (2004). Hejko's tasks for the project included finding actors for the film's juvenile roles with the help of his assistant Maja Mladenovska. According to Ristovski, this involved searching various Macedonian schools for potential actors, as well as months of test shooting and selection narrowing. The film's adult roles were largely filled by actors from Macedonia and other Balkan countries.

In various interviews, Ristovski cited several difficulties in producing the film. According to a 2005 interview, the project met with disapproval from the Macedonian government during pre-production. Ristovski credited his cast and crew for their dedication towards the project despite this difficulty, likening their participation to "comradery in a battle". In his WKCR interview, Ristovski also cited lack of technical resources such as film equipment and film laboratory services, which had to be sourced overseas.

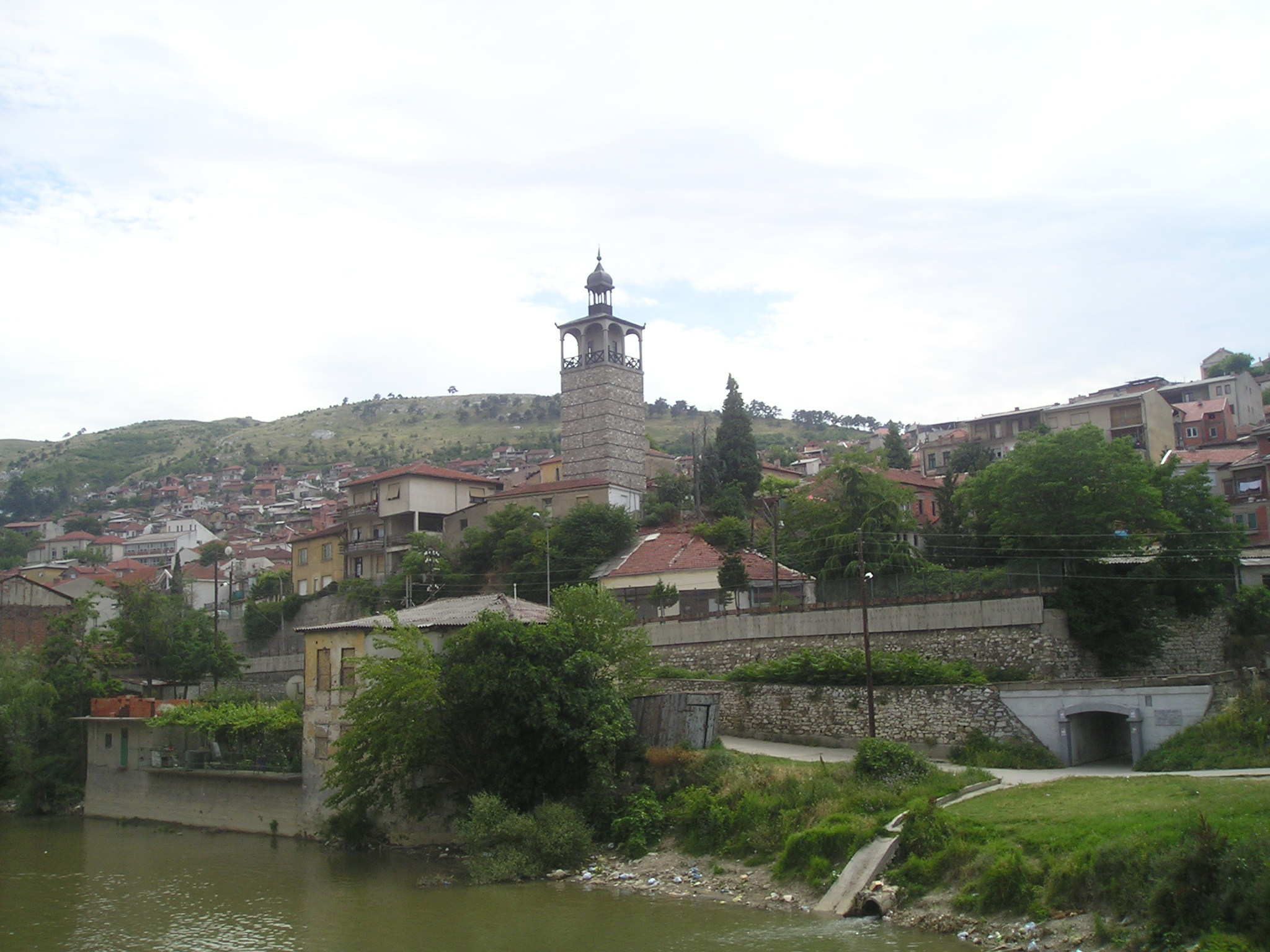
Veles, the film's setting.

Ristovski's production company, Small Moves, partnered with the Vienna-based Synchro Film to produce the film. The project had a budget of about 600,000 euros, to which the Macedonian Ministry of Culture contributed 500,000 and Synchro Film about 10%. During production, the film's working title was Godini na nadez, The film's post-production took place in Austria.

The film was shot on location in Veles during May and June 2003. Veles had been Ristovski's birthplace and childhood home, and his familiarity with the place served as an advantage for finding filming locations. He also had prior working experience with the film's cinematographer, Vladimir Samoilovski. According to his WKCR interview, he and Samoilovski aimed for a visual style that combined both "aesthetic beauty" and documentary-style "grittiness" in the film's depiction of Veles.

== Distribution ==
The film was distributed by Crescent Releasing, with Picture This! Entertainment handling theatrical and video releases in the United States. Its world premiere took place in Canada on 11 September 2004 during the 29th Toronto International Film Festival. In the United States, it premiered on 13 March 2005 during the 12th South by Southwest Film Festival. The film saw its first US theatrical release in New York City during March 2006, followed by a DVD release in July.

Mirage is distributed by EastWest Filmdistribution located in Vienna (Austria). The film's European premiere took place on 21 November 2004 during the 45th Thessaloniki International Film Festival. In Macedonia, it premiered on 11 March 2005 during the 8th Skopje Film Festival, with a theatrical release following in April.

== Reception ==
=== Box office ===
In the United States, the film opened in a single theatre on March 17, 2006 and grossed $1,511 during its one week of screening. Overall, the film has grossed $2,241 in the United States.

=== Critical reception ===
The film was well-received by most film critics. On Rotten Tomatoes, it has a score of 82%, based on 11 reviews. On Metacritic, the film earned a generally favourable score of 61% based on 8 reviews.

In general, critics have praised the film for its uncompromising realism. After its Toronto premiere, Variety lauded the film as "a modest triumph of fearless acting and pointed social commentary". Its release in the United States drew similar praise. "Ristovski needs us to feel his nation's torment, and he succeeds," wrote the New York Daily News. The Hollywood Reporter found the film's treatment of Marko's story "unremittingly grim and powerful", while TV Guide praised it for being "tense [and] gripping" as well as "starkly beautiful". The New York Times faulted the film's story for being somewhat "underdeveloped", but concluded with guarded praise for its "unnerving window on a Balkan country". The Village Voice characterized the film's portrayal of youthful misery as a "wicked evocation of hopelessness".

The film also received a few negative reviews. The New York Post summed up the film as "drab, despairing and pointless", while Slant Magazine found its treatment of Marko's story "shrill" and "unreal", likening the film to "drag[ging] the corpse of Billy Elliott [sic] through sewer water". Following its European premiere, the Macedonian daily Utrinski Vesnik praised the film for its realism and imagery, but concluded by criticizing its emphasis on misery for being one-sided.

Critics have singled out Marko Kovacevic in his lead role for praise. His performance was lauded as "remarkable" by Variety and "superb" by The Hollywood Reporter, while The Village Voice commended him for "channel[ing] gentle and ferocious with equal ease" in his depiction of the protagonist.

=== Awards ===
Event	Award	Winner/Nominee	Result
2004 Tokyo International Film Festival	Tokyo Grand Prix	Svetozar Ristovski	Nominated
2005 Anchorage International Film Festival	Best Feature	Svetozar Ristovski	Won
2005 Zlín International Film Festival for Children and Youth	Best European Debut Film	Svetozar Ristovski	Won
2006 Avanca Film Festival	Feature Film (Special Mention)	Svetozar Ristovski	Won
2006 Avanca Film Festival	Best Actor (Special Mention)	Marko Kovacevic	Won
2006 Avanca Film Festival	Cinematography	Vladimir Samoilovski	Won
