= Vladislava Milosavljević =

Serbian actress

- Born: 8 July 1955 (age 71); Belgrade, SR Serbia, SFR Yugoslavia
- Other name: Vladica Milosavljević
- Occupation: Actress
- Years active: 1978–present
- Spouse: Aleksandar Rafajlović
- Children: 2

Vladislava "Vladica" Milosavljević (Serbian Cyrillic: Владислава "Владица" Милосављевић; born 8 July 1955) is a Serbian film, theater and television actress.

== Career ==
Milosavljević was born in Belgrade, Serbia on 8 July 1955 in artistic family. Her father was a prominent Serbian actor Dragoljub "Gula" Milosavljević (1923–2005). Milosavljević attended secondary school of design, graphics. She graduated from Belgrade's Academy of Theater, Film, Radio and Television in 1979, her mentor was professor Predrag Bajčetić. Among her notable classmates were Mladen Andrejević, Radovan Miljanić. Her theater and film career spanned decades. She is a full time member of the Yugoslav Drama Theatre in Belgrade. She was a guest star in Atelje 212 theater in a drama "Bliže", directed by Alisa Stojanović. She had several leading roles in television films: "Alma Mahler", "Nedovršena simfonija", "Ivana", "Maska" (written by Miloš Crnjanski). In 2002, Milosavljević starred in a television comedy "Akcija tigar" directed by Slobodan Ćustić; and in 2003, short length film "Akcija".

She appeared in more than fifty films since 1978.

== Personal life ==
Milosavljević has two adult sons, Mihajlo and Gavrilo with her husband Aleksandar Rafajlović (born 1957) a prominent Serbian painter.

== Selected filmography ==
Year	Title	Role	Notes
1987	Oktoberfest		
1987	Kraljeva završnica		
1986	Happy New Year '49		
1982	Variola Vera		
1981	The Melody Haunts My Memory		
1980	Days of Dreams		
