= Ksenija Zečević =

Ksenija Zečević (Ксенија Зечевић; February 16, 1956 in Zadar – November 21, 2006 in Belgrade) was a popular Serbian pianist and composer. She worked on film and theatre music. She worked in Belgrade. She was of Montenegrin and Istrian ancestry.

== Filmography ==
- 1980 – Days of Dreams
- 1982 – Daleko nebo
- 1983 – Timočka buna
- 1988 – The Bizarre Country
- 1989 – Atoski vrtovi - preobraženje
- 1993 – Bolje od bekstva
- 1997 – Some Birds Can't Fly
