= The Secret Book =

- Directed by: Vlado Cvetanovski
- Written by: Jordan Plevnes (novel); Jordan Plevnes, Ljube Cvetanovski (screenplay)
- Produced by: KTV Media, Dimitar Nikolov
- Starring: Thierry Frémont; Jean-Claude Carrière; Vlado Jovanovski; Labina Mitevska; Djordji Jolevski; Meto Jovanovski
- Release date: 2006
- Country: Macedonia
- Languages: Macedonian, French

The Secret Book is a Macedonian feature film combining the detective, thriller and conspiracy fiction genres, based on "Secret Book" (French: Le Livre Secret, Macedonian: Тајната книга, romanized: Tajnata kniga), a real mystical book written by the Bogomils with Glagolitic letters (the first Slav alphabet, made by SS. Cyril and Methodius).

Bogomil ideas, carried back to France and Italy from the Balkans by refugees or returning crusaders in the 11th century, became the basis of the Cathar heresy. Like them, the Bogomils were massacred by the church and their name almost burned from history.

== Plot ==
Pierre Raymond (Jean-Claude Carrière) is a passionate explorer, a man who devoted all his life to the quest of the original "Secret Book", a book that exists as a legend in several religions and heresies, and was a holy book for the Bogomils, written in Glagolitic script.

Led by the strange messages from the Balkans brought to him by doves, he chooses his son Chevalier (Thierry Fremont) to search where he stopped. The messages are sent from Macedonia by Pavle Bigorski, a man that identifying himself with the authentic author of "The Secret Book" from the Middle Ages.

The book is supposed to contain the principle of good and evil and the principle of power, jumping across the time barrier and touched the essence of the Quest for the roots of Truth.

Bigorski has three brothers, symbolizing the three regions inhabited by ethnic Macedonians. Each brother represents some aspect of the Macedonian spirit (faith, rebellion towards the social evil, defense of honour).

=== Location ===
The movie was shot in 2002 and 2003 on location in Bitola and Ohrid in Macedonia, and Balchik in Bulgaria.

== See also ==
- The Da Vinci Code
- The Da Vinci Code (film)
