= Shqipe N. Duka =

Albanian theater and film director (born 1980)

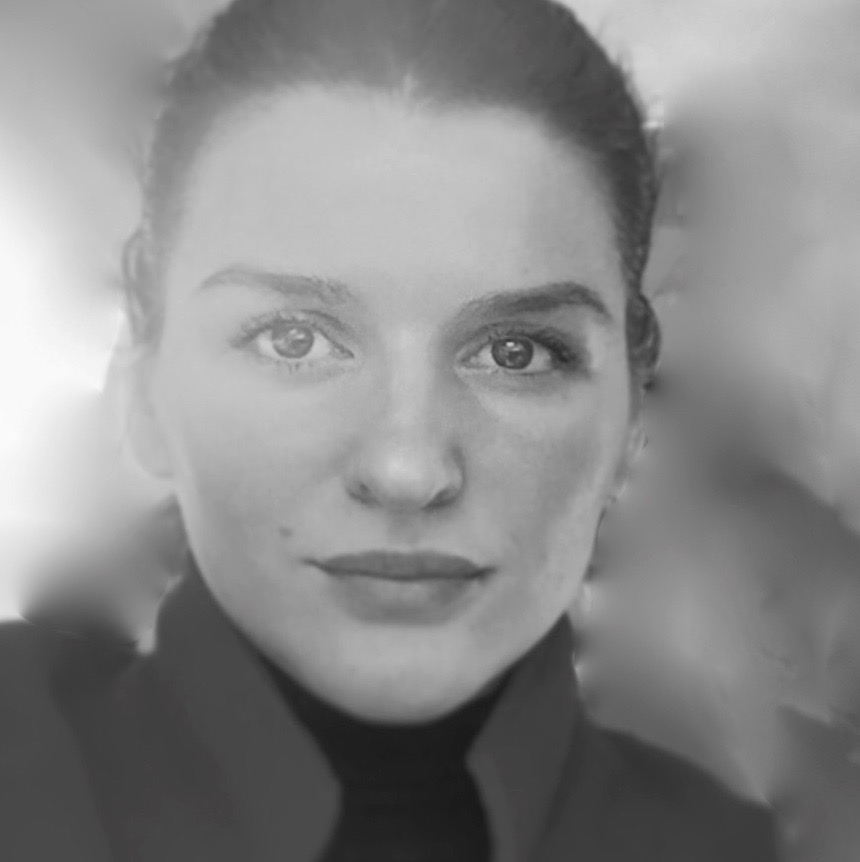
Shqipe Nuredini Duka

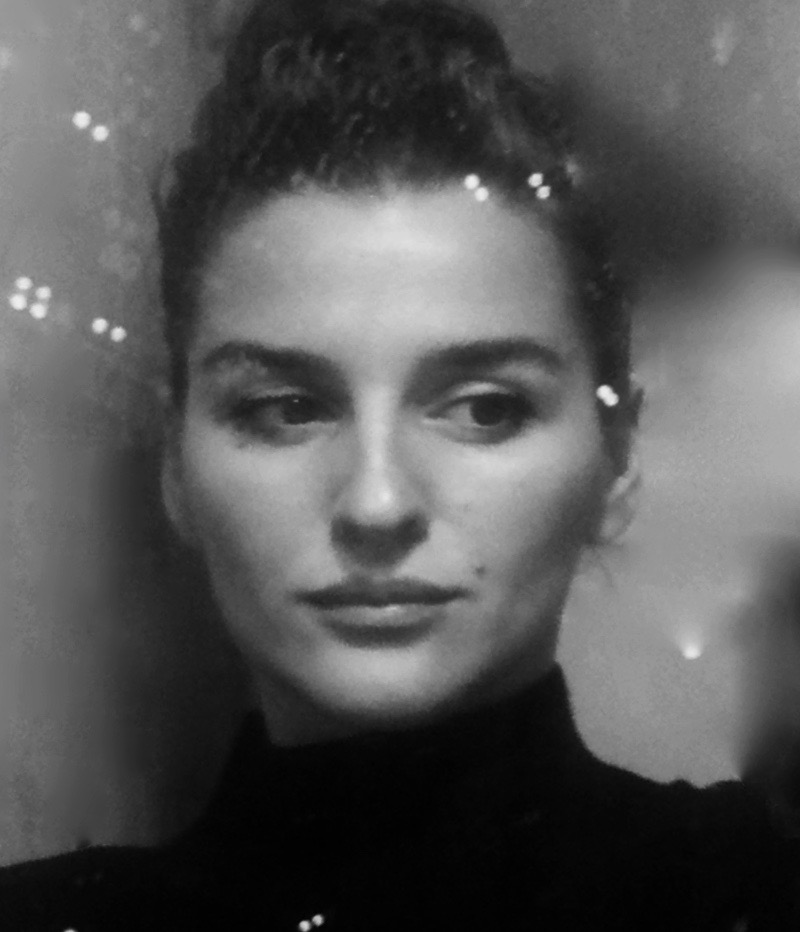
Shqipe Nuredini Duka

Shqipe Nuredini Duka (born March 29, 1980) is a theater and film director. She studied in the Faculty of dramatic arts and is the first Albanian female director in Macedonia. As a student she wrote and directed her first play The Motel. After graduation she managed to produce the first full-length film in the Albanian language My Father (2013). Duka has also directed some plays, War on the Third Floor by Pavel Kohout and The Dragon by Evgeny Shwartz. The Tobacco Grower is her first short film.

== See also ==
List of films from the Republic of Macedonia
