= Velgošti =

Velgošti Велгошти
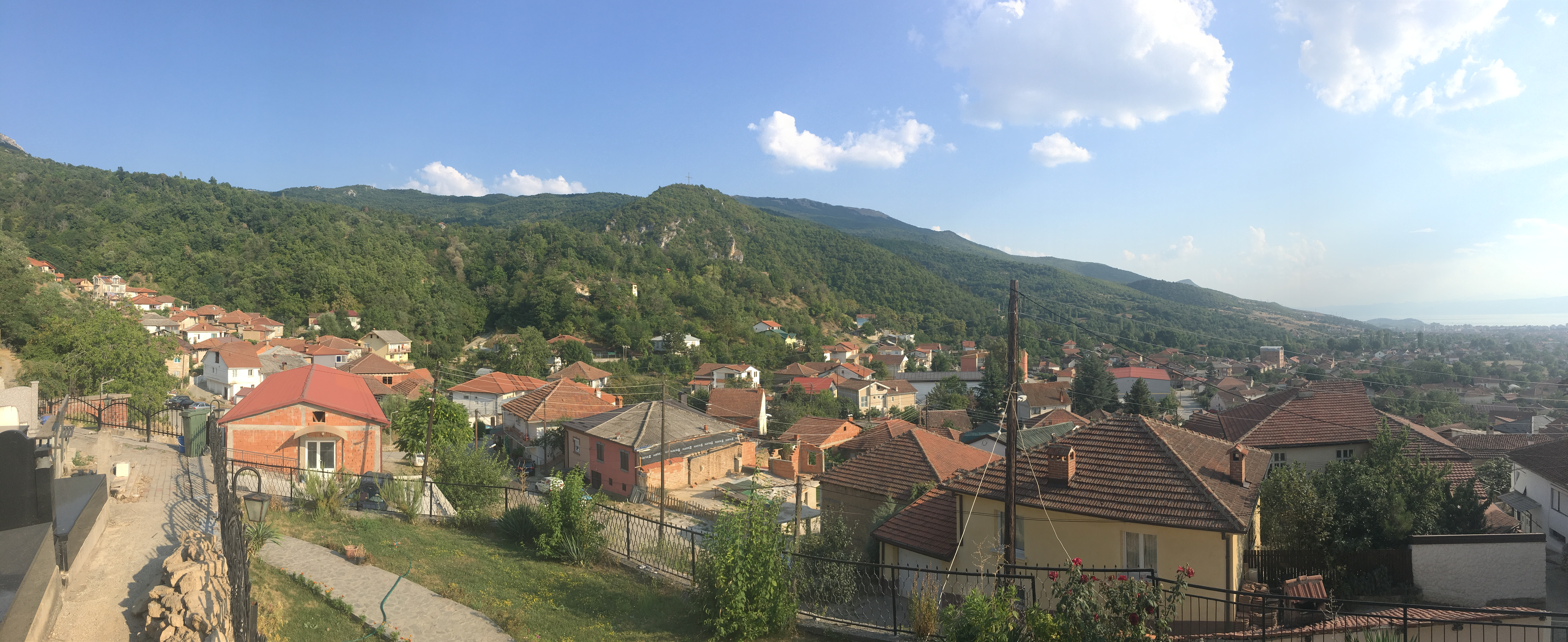
- Panoramic view of the village

- Location within North Macedonia
- Coordinates: 41°08′N 20°50′E
- Country: North Macedonia
- Region: Southwestern
- Municipality: Ohrid

Population (2021)
  - Total: 3,141
- Time zone: UTC+1 (CET)
  - Summer (DST): UTC+2 (CEST)

Velgošti (Macedonian: Велгошти) is a village in the municipality of Ohrid, North Macedonia. It has a primary school called Živko Čingo dedicated to the author born there.

== Demographics ==
According to the statistics of the Bulgarian ethnographer Vasil Kanchov from 1900, 1,220 inhabitants lived in Velgošti, 1,190 Christian Bulgarians and 30 Muslim Bulgarians.

As of the 2021 census, Velgošti had 3,141 residents with the following ethnic composition:

- Macedonians 2,673
- Persons for whom data are taken from administrative sources 394
- Others 66
- Vlachs 8

According to the 2002 census, the village had a total of 3,060 inhabitants. Ethnic groups in the village include:

- Macedonians 3,002
- Serbs 8
- Aromanians 10
- Others 40
