= Punk's Not Dead (2011 film) =

2011 film

- Film poster
- Directed by: Vladimir Blaževski
- Written by: Vladimir Blaževski
- Produced by: Darko Popov
- Starring: Jordančo Cevrevski
- Cinematography: Dimo Popov
- Music by: Aleksandar Pejovski
- Release date: 15 April 2011
- Running time: 104 minutes
- Countries: Macedonia; Serbia
- Languages: Macedonian; Albanian; Bosnian; Croatian

Punk's Not Dead (Macedonian: Панкот не е мртов, translit. Pankot ne e mrtov) is a 2011 comedy-drama film written and directed by Vladimir Blaževski. The film was selected as the Macedonian entry for the Best Foreign Language Film at the 84th Academy Awards, but it did not make the final shortlist.

== Cast ==
- Jordančo Čevrevski as the guy from NGO
- Flora Dostovska as Mimi
- Kiril Pop Hristov as Paša
- Viktor Lazarevski as Slovenec
- Jovica Mihajlovski as Guru
- Toni Mihajlovski as Ljak
- Emir Redžepi as Sali
- Jordan Simonov as Mirsa
- Kamka Tocinovski as Nina
- Vladimir Tuliev as Zuti
- Radka Radmanović as Milka
- Dušica Stojanovska as Komšivkata

== See also ==
- List of submissions to the 84th Academy Awards for Best Foreign Language Film
- List of Macedonian submissions for the Academy Award for Best Foreign Language Film
