= Kole Angelovski =

Macedonian actor

- Born: Nikola Angelovski; 14 March 1943 (age 83); Skopje, Kingdom of Bulgaria (now North Macedonia)
- Other name: Kole
- Occupation: Actor
- Years active: 1962–present

Nikola "Kole" Angelovski (born 14 March 1943) is a Macedonian actor. He appeared in more than fifty films since 1962.

== Selected filmography ==
Year	Title	Role	Notes
1965	Three		
1967	Macedonian Blood Wedding		
1967	Stronghold of Toughs		
1969	Battle of Neretva		
1970	The Fed One		
1973	The Battle of Sutjeska		
1982	The Falcon		
1984	Haven't I Told You		
1987-1990	Hajde da se volimo		
