= Živko Čingo =

Macedonian writer

Zhivko Chingo
- Born: 13 August 1935; Velgosti, Ohrid, Vardar Banovina, Kingdom of Yugoslavia (now North Macedonia)
- Died: 11 August 1987; Ohrid, SR Macedonia, SFR Yugoslavia (now North Macedonia)
- Occupation: Author

Živko Čingo (also spelt Zhivko Chingo) (13 August 1935 – 11 August 1987) was a Macedonian writer, born in Velgosti, near Ohrid, Kingdom of Yugoslavia.

== Biography ==
He studied literature at the University of Sts Cyril and Methodius in Skopje. He worked as a journalist and as Director of the Macedonian National Theatre.

He was part of the new wave of writers to emerge on the Macedonian literary scene in the post-World War II period. One of his novels, Golemata Voda (The Great Water), has been translated into English. It was also recently made into a movie, also called The Great Water. Some other short stories have also been translated and published in various collections.

== Bibliography ==
- "Пасквелија" (Paskvelia, short stories, 1961)
- "Семејството Огулиновци" (Ogulinov Family, short stories, 1965)
- "Нова Пасквелија" (New Paskvelia, short stories, 1965)
- "Сребрени снегови" (Silver Snows, novel for children, 1966)
- "Пожар" (The Fire, short stories, 1970)
- "Големата вода" (The Great Water, novel, 1971)
- "Жед" (Thirst, screenplay, 1971)
- "Поле" (Field, screenplay, 1971)
- "Образов" (Cheek, play, 1973)
- "Ѕидот, водата" (The Wall, The Water, play, 1976)
- "Вљубениот дух" (The Ghost in Love, short stories, 1976)
- "Кенгурски скок" (Кangaroo Јump, play, 1979)
- "Макавејските празници"' (The Maccabean Feasts, play, 1982)
- "Накусо" (In Brief, short stories, 1984)
- "Пчеларник" (Бeehives, screenplay, 1988)
- "Гроб за душата" (Grave for the Soul, short stories, 1989)
- "Бабаџан" (Babajan, novel, 1989)
- "Бунило" (Delirium, short stories, 1989)
