= Gypsy Magic =

- Directed by: Stole Popov
- Written by: Vladimir Blaževski
- Music by: Vlatko Stefanovski
- Production company: Vardar Film
- Release date: 1997
- Running time: 126 minutes
- Country: Macedonia
- Language: Romani (Note: Other languages include English and Macedonian.)

Gypsy Magic is a 1997 Macedonian film directed by Stole Popov. It was Macedonia's submission to the 70th Academy Awards for the Academy Award for Best Foreign Language Film, but was not accepted as a nominee.

== Plot ==
On New Year's Eve, a street party occurs in 1994 in Shutka (Šuto Orizari). In a nearby makeshift cinema, a local Romani man Taip, his son Shakir, and a United Nations Protection Force (UNPROFOR) medical doctor named Riju watch the Indian musical romance film Bobby. Taip lives in a shack on the outskirts of Shutka with his mother, wife Remzija and eight children. He is the unchallenged patriarch of his family. All eight of their children live with them. Riju brings UN humanitarian food into Taip's home and befriends him. His oldest son Bajram helps him find scrap metal from the dump. Bajram and Taip get into a conflict with Omer and his Romani family clan, who also have their focus on the dump. Taip plans on buying a white horse so that he can earn money from racing and move to India. Taip's mother supposedly dies. Taip and Bajram collect the governmental money for the funeral. They discover the woman is not dead but they hide her so that they do not have to return the money. Taip persuades Remzija to fake death so that he can buy her a bed. He also fakes the death of his son Fazli, who has been badly beaten by Omer's clan. With the money, Taip buys the white horse which he names Krishna. The purchase of the horse is celebrated in a local pub. Taip and Riju are joined by other three members of UNPROFOR. Omer and his clan enter the pub. Instigated by Riju, his three UNPROFOR friends beat Omer's clan. Needing more money to prepare the horse, Taip convinces Shakir to fake death. Taip moves the family out of Shutka but Fazli runs away. Fazli finds and kills Omer with a knife as an act of revenge. Shakir comes out as transgender in the new place, revealing his wish to go to Italy. Riju seduces Taip's daughter Ramiza. Taip convinces Bajram to fake death but he insists on a funeral and a feast. After they bury Bajram, Taip and Riju go to a pub for a drink but they later return to the graveyard, finding Bajram dead. Omer's clan finds Taip's new place and burns it down. The family moves out again. To his disappointment, Taip discovers Riju having sexual intercourse with Shakir. Riju leaves Skopje without saying goodbye. Taip gets murdered by Omer's clan. Remzija laments his disappearance.

== Cast ==
- Miki Manojlović as Taip
- Antony Zaki as Riju
- Katina Ivanova as Remzija
- Bajram Severdzan as Bajram
- Toni Mihajlovski as Fazli
- Arna Shijak as Ramiza
- Goran Dodevski as Shakir
- Šaban Bajramović as Omer

== Production ==
The film's script was written by Vladimir Blaževski. Vlatko Stefanovski made the film's music. The shooting of the film occurred between December 1995 and May 1996. Most of the film was filmed in and around the Skopje suburb of Šuto Orizari, a Romani settlement. A couple of exterior scenes were also filmed in several locations in Skopje and the city dump. The film's principal language was Romani. The cast was a combination of professional and amateur actors.

== Release ==
In 1997, the film premiered at the Montréal World Film Festival. The film was a nominee for the Grand Prix des Amériques award. It won the Grand Prix Antigone D'Oro for Best Film award. While focusing on the Romani people, the film's director Stole Popov admitted that his real intention was to depict the condition of uncertainty experienced by Macedonia in the early 1990s, which after hurriedly declaring independence, entered a period of transition for which it was not prepared. Per Popov:

This is a funny yet sad story of a Gypsy family of great dreamers making a last, desperate effort to find their way out of the Balkan labyrinth of absurdity, evil, and misfortune. In terms of atmosphere and associations which come to mind, the story explores a situation in which one set of social rules have suddenly disappeared while new ones are still being established. In another way of putting it, the lights are going out and in the new darkness you are responsible for finding your way around the best you can. The Gypsies serve merely as a picturesque backdrop for the more universal story of the rejected and the maladjusted, of those who don’t know the rules and have trouble finding their way around in the dark.

== Reception ==
Reviewer Petar Volnarovski criticized the film in the magazine Blesok, writing: "The finished film seems like a working copy at its early stage. Superficial and shallow, with no film effects or tricks, it is poorly made; it brings a monotone narrating, with no dynamics of events (presenting the facts only and nothing else)." Brendan Kelly of the magazine Variety wrote: "The most interesting moments in "Gipsy Magic" are the fascinating glimpses provided of life in modern-day Macedonia, but the story is scattershot, the central character is an unpleasant boor, and helmer Stole Popov takes way too long to wend his way through this strange tale. It's a fest item at best."

== See also ==
- List of submissions to the 70th Academy Awards for Best Foreign Language Film
- List of Macedonian submissions for the Academy Award for Best Foreign Language Film
