= Aco Jovanovski =

Macedonian film and television actor

- Born: 31 December 1930; Skopje, Vardar Banovina, Kingdom of Yugoslavia
- Died: 18 March 2016 (aged 75); Skopje, Macedonia
- Occupation: Actor
- Years active: 1952–2006 (film)

Aco Jovanovski (1930–2016) was a Macedonian film and television actor. He made his screen debut in 1952 in Frosina, the first ever Macedonian language film.

His daughter Silvija Stojanovska is an actress.

== Selected filmography ==
- Frosina (1952)
- The False Passport (1959)
- A Quiet Summer (1961)
- Mountain of Wrath (1968)
- Times Without War (1969)
- The Price of a Town (1970)
- Black Seed (1971)
- Seljacka buna 1573 (1975)
- The Red Horse (1980)
- The Lead Brigade (1980)

== Bibliography ==
- Daniel J. Goulding. Liberated Cinema: The Yugoslav Experience, 1945-2001. Indiana University Press, 2002.
