= The Same Sky =

The Same Sky may refer to:

- The Same Sky (play), a 1951 play by Yvonne Mitchell set in London during The Blitz, televised in 1953
- The Same Sky (TV series), a 2017 German TV series set in Berlin during the Cold War

== See also ==
- Same Sky
- Under the Same Sky (disambiguation)
