= Sun Never Again =

2024 Serbian film

- International promotional poster
- Serbian: Sunce nikad više
- Directed by: David Jovanović
- Screenplay by: Djordje Kosic; David Jovanović
- Produced by: David Jovanovic; Rastko Petrović
- Starring: Rastko Racic; Dusan Jovic
- Cinematography: Mladen Teofilović
- Edited by: David Jovanovic; Mina Petrović; Branislava Stefanović
- Music by: Nemanja Mosurovic
- Production company: Pointless Films
- Release date: 20 November 2024 (Tallinn Black Nights Film Festival)
- Running time: 72 minutes
- Country: Serbia
- Language: Serbian

Sun Never Again (Serbian: Sunce nikad više) is a 2024 Serbian film co-written and directed by David Jovanović, in his debut feature. A drama, it explores how a father's struggle against industrial encroachment is transformed by his son's imaginative worldview, revealing resilience and hope through a fusion of innocence, mysticism, and storytelling.

The film had its world premiere at the Tallinn Black Nights Film Festival on 20 November 2024. It was selected as the Serbian entry for the Best International Feature Film at the 98th Academy Awards, but it was not nominated.

== Cast ==
- Dusan Jovic as Vid
- Rastko Racic as Dule
- Natasa Markovic as Ada
- Radovan Miljanic as Radjo
- Joakim Tasic as Pop
- Svetozar Cvetković as Bog

== Production ==
The film produced by Pointless Films in co-production with the Faculty of Dramatic Arts in Belgrade, was shot in Bor, Serbia and Negotin in Bor District in 2021.

== Release ==
Sun Never Again had its premiere in the 'First Feature Competition' at the Tallinn Black Nights Film Festival on 20 November 2024.

It was screened at Cultural Centre of Belgrade movie theatre on 25 December 2024 and Cinema Vrnjačka Banja, Serbia on 11 January 2025.

It completed in International competition Glocal Images at the Cyprus Film Days International Festival on 7 April 2025.

In April 2025, it participated in The Festival – Europe around Europe, at Paris European Film Festival with screening at The Ursulines Studio on 26 April. It competed in Connections 2025 and SAUVAGE 2025 Prize Competition.

== Reception ==
At the Tallinn Black Nights Film Festival, the film was praised by Marko Stojiljković of Cineuropa. Stojiljković observed that the director drawing from his own childhood experiences in a Bosnian mining village and inspired by David Lynch’s rendition of "The Ballad of Hollis Brown," "unites the realist Yugoslav Black Wave with magical realism in an extremely potent way." Stojiljković commended the cinematography by Mladen Teofilović, describing the handheld camerawork and dim lighting as perfectly suited to the film's setting in Krivelj, Eastern Serbia. Stojiljković, emphasizing the contribution of Nemanja Mosurović's abstract music and Antonio Andrić's "striking sound design," which in his opinion together "complemented the visual aspect" of the film. Edited by Jovanović alongside Branislava Stefanović and Mina Petrović, Stojiljković described the film as leaving "the impression of a contemporary symphonic poem," underscoring its lyrical and immersive qualities.

== Accolades ==
Award	Ceremony date	Category	Recipient(s)	Result	Ref.
Tallinn Black Nights Film Festival	24 November 2024	First Feature Competition	Sun Never Again	Nominated	

== See also ==
- List of submissions to the 98th Academy Awards for Best International Feature Film
- List of Serbian submissions for the Academy Award for Best International Feature Film
