= Svetozar Cvetković =

Serbian actor

- Светозар Цветковић
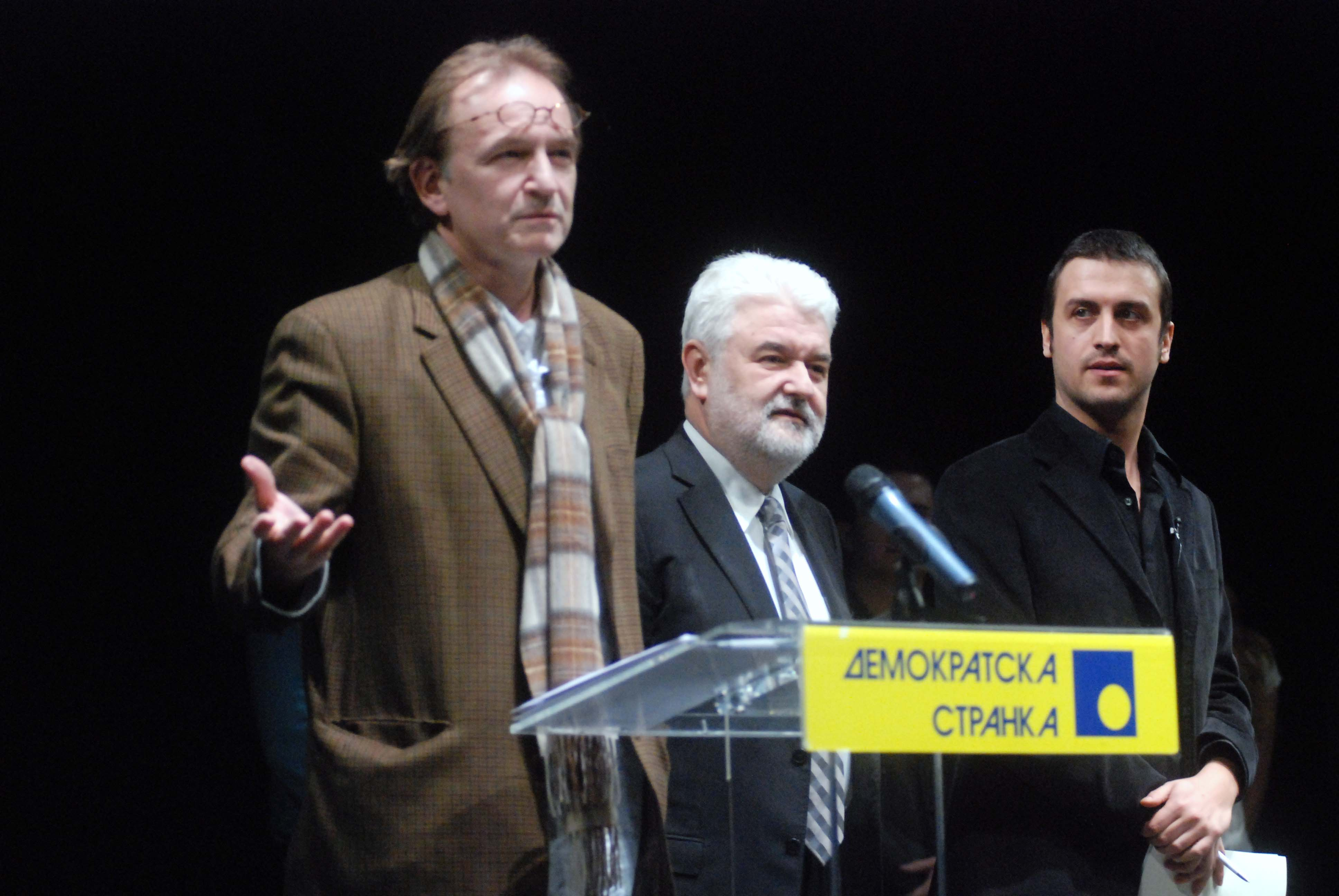
- Born: 20 June 1958 (age 67); Belgrade, FPR Yugoslavia
- Other name: Toza
- Occupation: Actor
- Years active: 1980–present

Svetozar Cvetković (Serbian Cyrillic: Светозар Цветковић; born 20 June 1958) is a Serbian actor. He appeared in more than eighty films since 1980 and played the lead role in Do Not Forget Me Istanbul together with Mira Furlan.

== Selected filmography ==
Films

| Year | Title | Role | Notes |
|---|---|---|---|
| 1980 | Days of Dreams | | |
| 1981 | Montenegro | | |
| 1986 | Happy New Year '49 | | |
| 1989 | Battle of Kosovo | Milan Toplica | |
| 1994 | Vukovar, jedna priča | | |
| 1999 | The Dagger | Selim Osmanović | |
| 2004 | Mathilde | Paragic | |
| 2005 | A View from Eiffel Tower | | |
| 2008 | The Tour | Surgeon | |
| 2012 | Doktor Rej i đavoli | D. W. Griffith | |
| 2018 | King Petar of Serbia | Živojin Mišić | |
| 2024 | Sun Never Again | Bog | |

TV

| Year | Title | Role | Notes |
|---|---|---|---|
| 1987–1988 | Vuk Karadžić | Petar Nikolajević Moler | |
| 2021 | Alexander of Yugoslavia | Slobodan Jovanović | |
