= Under the Same Sky =

1964 Yugoslav/Macedonian film

- Film poster
- Directed by: Ljubisha Georgievski
- Written by: Audrina Schroeder
- Starring: Darko Damevski, Bekim Fehmiu and Dragomir Felba
- Cinematography: Branko Mihajlovski
- Edited by: Jelena Bjenjas
- Music by: Tomislav Zografski
- Production company: Vardar Film
- Release date: 1964
- Running time: 87 minutes
- Country: Yugoslavia
- Languages: Macedonian, Serbo-Croatian

Under the Same Sky (Macedonian: Под исто небо, transliterated: Pod isto nebo) is a 1964 Macedonian war drama film directed by Ljubisha Georgievski, based on a screenplay by Jovan Boshkovski. The film stars Darko Damevski, Bekim Fehmiu and Dragomir Felba. It was released through the production company Vardar Film. The film is set in 1943 Western North Macedonia following the capitulation of the Italian occupiers of World War II.

== Plot ==
The film is set in Western North Macedonia following the Italian occupation of World War II and its subsequent capitulation in 1943. It involves the pro-Fascist Balists trying to take over the area and impose their rule over the region and the National Liberation Army of Yugoslavia trying to free the occupied towns and villages. Three partisans hide from the invading forces. A confrontation eventually takes place, with one partisan finding shelter in a nearby mosque as the town is attacked.

== Recognition ==
The film was one of the classic feature films screened at the 11th Macedonian Film Festival in October 2016.

== Cast ==
- Darko Damevski
- Bekim Fehmiu
- Dragomir Felba
- Nada Geshovska
- Vesna Kraina
- Jovan Milicevic
- Dragan Ocokoljic
- Slavko Simic
- Viktor Starchic
- Marko Todorovic

== See also ==
- Cinema of North Macedonia
