= Haven't I Told You =

- Macedonian: Нели ти реков
- Directed by: Stevo Crvenkovski
- Written by: Rusomir Bogdanovski
- Starring: Nikola-Kole Angelovski, Petre Arsovski and Marin Babic
- Cinematography: Ljubomir Vaglenarov
- Edited by: Kemal Demirovic
- Music by: Ljupčo Konstantinov
- Production company: Vardar Film
- Release date: 12 June 1984 (Yugoslavia)
- Running time: 85 minutes
- Country: Yugoslavia
- Language: Macedonian

Haven't I Told You (Macedonian: Нели ти реков, romanized: Neli ti rekov) is a Macedonian film that was produced in Yugoslavia in 1984. It is based on real events in Macedonia during the Ottoman era. The plot revolves around a number of Macedonian revolutionaries battling against a large Ottoman army force during the Ilinden–Preobrazhenie Uprising. The film can be seen with English subtitles.
