= Sisterhood (2021 film) =

2021 film

- Theatrical release poster
- Directed by: Dina Duma
- Written by: Dina Duma; Martin Ivanov
- Starring: Antonija Belazelkoska
- Music by: Igor Vasilev Novogradska
- Release date: 23 August 2021 (KVIFF)
- Running time: 90 minutes
- Countries: North Macedonia; Kosovo; Montenegro
- Language: Macedonian

Sisterhood (Macedonian: Сестри, romanized: Sestri) is a 2021 drama film co-written and directed by Dina Duma. It was selected as the Macedonian entry for the Best International Feature Film at the 94th Academy Awards.

== Cast ==
- Antonija Belazelkoska as Maya
- Mia Giraud as Jana
- Marija Jancevska as Elena
- Hanis Bagashov as Kris

== See also ==
- List of submissions to the 94th Academy Awards for Best International Feature Film
- List of Macedonian submissions for the Academy Award for Best International Feature Film
