= Frosina =

- Directed by: Vojislav Nanović
- Written by: Vlado Malevski
- Produced by: Dragoslav Radoicic-Beli
- Starring: Meri Boskova; Aco Jovanovski; Ljuba Arsova
- Cinematography: Kiro Bilbilovski
- Edited by: Milanka Nanovic
- Music by: Trajko Prokopiev
- Production company: Vardar Film
- Release date: 26 June 1952
- Running time: 88 minutes
- Country: Yugoslavia
- Language: Macedonian

Frosina is a 1952 Yugoslavian drama film directed by Vojislav Nanović and starring Meri Boskova, Aco Jovanovski and Ljuba Arsova. Produced by the newly-established Vardar Film, it was the first Macedonian language film to be made. Future star Nadja Regin had a small part in the film.

== Cast ==
- Meri Boskova as Frosina
- Aco Jovanovski as Klime
- Ljuba Arsova as Ljuba
- Ilija Dzuvalekovski as Goce
- Petar Prličko as Kuzman (credited as Petre Prličkov)
- Kiro Vinokic as Asen
- Stojka Cekova as Ustijanka
- Boris Beginov as Eftim
- Lidija Debarlieva as Veta
- Kiro Cortosev as Karavil
- Petar Veljanovski as Jane
- Tomo Vidov as Krste
- Perica Cvetkovski as Maliot Klime
- Nadja Regin as Kalina

== Bibliography ==
- Dimitar Bechev. Historical Dictionary of the Republic of Macedonia. Scarecrow Press, 2009.
