= Vladimir Blaževski =

Macedonian film director

- Born: 3 June 1955 (age 69); Skopje, Yugoslavia (present-day North Macedonia)
- Occupation(s): Director, screenwriter
- Years active: 1978–present

Vladimir Blaževski (Macedonian: Владимир Блажевски; born 3 June 1955) is a Macedonian film director and screenwriter.

Best known for his documentaries, Blaževski made several acclaimed feature films as well, including Hi-Fi, which won him the Golden Arena for Best Director at the Yugoslav Film Awards in 1987, and Punk's Not Dead which was selected as the Macedonian entry for the Best Foreign Language Film at the 84th Academy Awards, without making the final shortlist.
