= Kiril Pop Hristov =

Macedonian film, television and theatre actor (1967–2026)

- Born: 30 July 1967; Skopje, SR Macedonia, SFR Yugoslavia
- Died: 11 March 2026 (aged 58); Quito, Ecuador
- Education: Ss. Cyril and Methodius University of Skopje
- Occupation: Actor
- Years active: 1977–2018

Kiril Pop Hristov (30 July 1967 – 11 March 2026), nicknamed "Kili", was a Macedonian film, television and theatre actor. He appeared in over 20 films and television programs from 1977 to 2018, and was best known for playing Ćoro in the 2005 film Bal-Can-Can.

Pop Hristov died at his home in Quito, on 11 March 2026, at the age of 58.
