= The Happiest Man in the World (2022 film) =

2022 Austrian drama film

- Directed by: Teona Strugar Mitevska
- Screenplay by: Teona Strugar Mitevska; Elma Tataragić
- Produced by: Labina Mitevska
- Starring: Jelena Kordić Kuret
- Cinematography: Virginie Saint-Martin
- Edited by: Per K. Kirkegaard
- Release date: 2022
- Countries: North Macedonia; Denmark; Belgium; Bosnia and Herzegovina; Croatia; Slovenia

The Happiest Man in the World (Macedonian: Најсреќниот човек на светот, romanized: Najsreḱniot čovek na svetot, Danish: Et strejf af lykke, French: L'Homme le plus heureux du monde) is a 2022 drama film written and directed by Teona Strugar Mitevska.

An international co-production between North Macedonia, Denmark, Belgium, Bosnia, Croatia and Slovenia, it premiered at the 79th edition of the Venice Film Festival in the Orizzonti sidebar. The film won the Grand Prize at the 2022 Les Arcs Film Festival. It was selected as the Macedonian entry for the Best International Feature Film at the 95th Academy Awards.

== Cast ==
- Jelena Kordić Kuret as Asja
- Adnan Omerović as Zoran
- Labina Mitevska as Marta
- Ana Kostovska as Mersiha
- Ksenija Marinković as Azemina
- Izudin Bajrović as Asim
- Irma Alimanović as Ema
- Vedrana Božinović as Aida
- Mona Muratović as Sabina

== See also ==
- List of submissions to the 95th Academy Awards for Best International Feature Film
- List of Macedonian submissions for the Academy Award for Best International Feature Film
