= Happy New Year '49 =

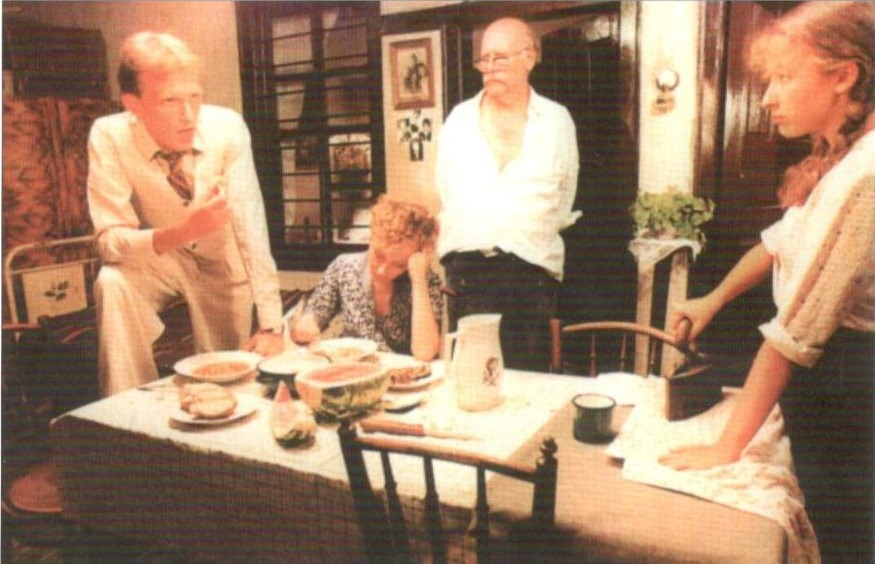
- Directed by: Stole Popov
- Written by: Gordan Mihić
- Produced by: Aleksandar Stojanović
- Starring: Svetozar Cvetković; Meto Jovanovski; Vladislava Milosavljević; Aco Đorčev; Dušan Kostovski
- Cinematography: Mišo Samoilovski
- Edited by: Laki Čemčev
- Music by: Ljupčo Konstantinov
- Production companies: Union Film; Vardar Film
- Release date: 27 June 1986
- Running time: 125 mins
- Languages: Macedonian, Serbo-Croatian

Happy New Year '49 (Serbo-Croatian: Srećna nova '49.; Macedonian: Среќна Нова ’49) is a 1986 Yugoslavian Macedonian-language drama film directed by Stole Popov, starring Svetozar Cvetković, Meto Jovanovski, Vladislava Milosavljević and Aco Đorčev. It was Yugoslavia's submission to the 59th Academy Awards for the Academy Award for Best Foreign Language Film, but it failed to make the nominees shortlist.

== See also ==
- List of submissions to the 59th Academy Awards for Best Foreign Language Film
- List of Yugoslav submissions for the Academy Award for Best Foreign Language Film
