= Kiril Cenevski =

Macedonian film director (1943–2019)

- Born: 28 January 1943; Kriva Palanka, Kingdom of Bulgaria (present-day North Macedonia)
- Died: 17 June 2019 (aged 76)
- Years active: 1970–1985

Kiril Cenevski (Macedonian: Кирил Ценевски; 28 January 1943 – 17 June 2019) was a Macedonian film director.

== Education and career ==
Cenevski studied at the Faculty of Architecture and Civil Engineering in Skopje. He completed a graduate program in Motion Pictures and Television at the School of Cinema and Television, University of Southern California, USA. He began his career as an assistant director on television productions and documentaries in the late '60s. Cenevski made his feature-film debut as a director with 'Crno Seme'(Black Seed) in 1971. Though his subsequent filmography is sparse, Cenevski was active in theater and television. At one time, Cenevski chaired the Union of Macedonian Film Workers. One of the highpoints of his career was his "Golden Lens" award in 2013, which the Cinematheque of Macedonia awarded for outstanding contribution to Macedonian cinematography.

== Filmography ==
His most notable feature film was Black Seed (Crno seme, 1971) for which he won the Golden Arena for Best Director at the 1971 Pula Film Festival. The film was also entered into the 7th Moscow International Film Festival. Cenevski's filmography consisted of the following:

- 1970 : The cost of the city (Assistant Director,)
- 1971 : Black Seed (Director, Screenplay)
- 1975 : Yad (Director, Screenplay) 1975 : Leopold Sedar Senghor (Direction)
- 1976 : Fazil Hysni Daglardzha (Direction)
- 1976 : Eugenio Montale (Director, Screenplay)
- 1978 : Dzhafra (Direction)
- 1979 : Rafael Alberti (Direction)
- 1979 : Eugene Gilvik (Direction)
- 1980 : Lead Brigade (Director, Screenplay)
- 1982 : Bridges - Struga Poetry Evenings ( Director,)
- 1984 : Huaskaran - Andy '82 (Director, Screenplay)
- 1985 : Node (Direction)

== Awards ==
Cenevski received the following awards:

- 1971 FYFF Pula, Golden Arena for directing / "Black Seed"
- 1971 FYFF Pula, gold crown for best debut director / "Black Seed"
- 1971 IFF Moscow Award "Phoenix" for best debut director / "Black Seed"
- 1972 IFF Avellino, Laceno D'Oro Award for directing / "Black Seed"
- 1972 Oscar nominee Yugoslavian 72 / "Black Seed"
- 1972 Award for October 11 "Black Seed"
- 1976 Karlovy Vary IFF, Special Award for the film / "Yad"
- 1980 FYFF Pula, Prize "Prvomajska" the film with modern themes / "Lead Brigade"
- 1980 Award of miners in the film Rasha / "Lead Brigade"
- 1980 Silver Medal of CIDALC / "Lead Brigade"
- Movies: 1987 Hemteks, directing, documentary, film Vardar
