= Jordan Plevnes =

Macedonian writer (born 1953)

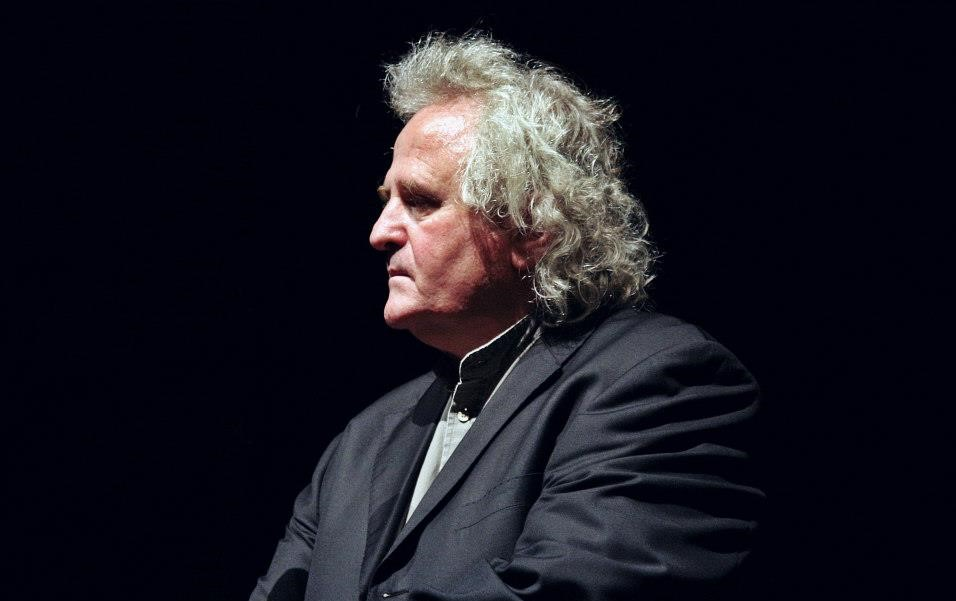
- Born: 1953 (age 72–73)
- Occupations: Writer and diplomat

Jordan Plevnes (born 1953) is a Macedonian writer and diplomat. From 2000 to 2005 he served as Ambassador of the Republic of Macedonia to France, Spain and Portugal. Since 2006 he has served as vice president of UNESCO's international committee for dialogue between civilizations.

He is the founder of the World Prized of Humanism and the Ohrid Academy of Humanism in Macedonia on 19.01.1991 with Liljana Kotevska Plevnes, Zoran Veljanovski Letra and several Macedonian intellectuals. In 2018 he co-founded with Frederic Fappani von Lothringen the youth prize for this same prize.

== Books about ==
- World Encyclopedia of Contemporary Theatre: Volume 1: Europe

== Books of ==
- Mazedonische zustände 1997
- La huitième merveille du monde: roman 2006
