= Maja Stankovska =

Macedonian footballer

Personal information
- Date of birth: 13 January 1988 (age 38)
- Position: Forward

International career^{‡}
Years	Team	Apps	(Gls)
2009–2011	Macedonia	9	(0)
- ‡ National team caps and goals as of 09:46, 21 September 2021 (UTC)

Maja Stankovska (born 13 January 1988) is a Macedonian footballer who plays as a forward for the North Macedonia national team.

== International career ==
Stankovska made her debut for the North Macedonia national team on 19 September 2009, against Slovakia.
