= To the Hilt (film) =

2014 Macedonian action-adventure Western film by Stole Popov

- Directed by: Stole Popov
- Written by: Goran Stefanovski co-writer Stole Popov
- Produced by: Jordanco Cevrevski; Milivoje Gorgevic
- Starring: Inti Šraj; Sashko Kocev; Martin Jordanoski; Toni Mihajlovski; Iskra Veterova; Senko Velinov; Miki Manojlovich; Nikola Kojo; Nikola Ristanovski; Dragan Spasov–Dac; Gorast Cvetkovski; Denis Abdula; Vlado Jovanovski; Ana Kostovska; Kamka Tocinovski; Biljana Jovanovska; Goran Trifunovski; Nenad Nacev; Bojan Velevski; Adem Karaga; Jordan Simeonov; Ramizi Hajrulah; Jovica Mihajlovski
- Cinematography: Apostol Trpeski
- Edited by: Atanas Georgiev; Blagoja Nedelkovski
- Music by: Duke Bojadziev
- Release date: 14 September 2014
- Running time: 165 minutes
- Country: Macedonia
- Languages: Macedonian; French; English; Turkish

To the Hilt: Story from the Wild East (Macedonian: До балчак - Приказна од дивиот исток, romanized: Do balčak - Prikazna od diviot istok) is a 2014 Macedonian action-adventure Western film directed by Stole Popov. The film takes place in Ottoman-ruled Macedonia. The filming started in May 2012, and scenes were shot in Bitola, Ohrid, Skopje, Demir Hisar, Štip and Prilep. It premiered in Skopje, in October 2014.

It was selected as the Macedonian entry for the Best Foreign Language Film at the 87th Academy Awards, but was not nominated.

== Cast ==
- Inti Sraj - Tereza
- Sasko Kocev - Krsto
- Martin Jordanoski - Filip
- Toni Mihajlovski - Muzafer
- Iskra Veterova - Ana
- Senko Velinov - Boro
- Miki Manojlovic - Bogdan
- Nikola Kojo - Agent
- Nikola Ristanovski - Cvetko
- Dragan Spasov-Dac - Shishe
- Gorast Cvetkovski - Kaval

== See also ==
- List of submissions to the 87th Academy Awards for Best Foreign Language Film
- List of Macedonian submissions for the Academy Award for Best Foreign Language Film
