= Goodbye, 20th Century! =

1998 film by Darko Mitrevski and Aleksandar Popovski

- Poster art
- Directed by: Darko Mitrevski; Aleksandar Popovski
- Written by: Darko Mitrevski; Aleksandar Popovski
- Produced by: Darko Mitrevski
- Starring: Nikola Ristanovski; Lazar Ristovski; Vlado Jovanovski
- Cinematography: Vladimir Samailovski
- Edited by: Peter Jakonic
- Music by: Risto Vrtev
- Distributed by: Salt City Productions (US release)
- Release date: November 17, 1998 (Slovenia)
- Running time: 83 minutes
- Country: Macedonia
- Language: Macedonian

Goodbye, 20th Century! (Macedonian: Збогум на дваесеттиот век!, romanized: Zbogum na dvaesettiot vek!) is a 1998 Macedonian science fiction film directed by Darko Mitrevski and Aleksandar Popovski.

== Plot ==
Goodbye, 20th Century! consists of three stories of extreme violence and emotional despair. The first takes place in the year 2019, where the world has become an environment of apocalyptic wreckage and ruin. A man named Kuzman is sentenced to death by a nomadic tribe, but their attempts to fatally shoot the condemned man are a failure. Fated to live forever, Kuzman wanders the wasteland until he encounters an enigmatic figure who offers him information on how he can escape eternal life.

The second story is a three-minute segment that takes place in 1900. Presented as a record of the first wedding ceremony ever captured on film, the scene devolves into violence when it is discovered the newlyweds are actually brother and sister.

The third story takes place on New Year's Eve 1999. A man dressed as Santa Claus returns to his apartment building, where a wake is in session. The solemn mourning degenerates into violence while the sounds of the Sid Vicious punk rock rendition of "My Way" floods the proceedings.

== US release ==
Goodbye, 20th Century! was Macedonia's submission to the 71st Academy Awards for the Academy Award for Best Foreign Language Film, but was not among the five finalists to achieve the Oscar nomination.

The film had its US premiere at 1999 Cinequest Film Festival in San Jose, California. The same year, it played in the first annual B-Movie Film Festival in Syracuse, New York, where it won awards for Best Editing and Best Set Design.

Goodbye, 20th Century! had a brief theatrical release later in 1999, where it received mixed reviews. Dennis Harvey, writing for Variety, stated "the film's pacing is uneven, tone and intent often unclear, but the visually stylish Goodbye, 20th Century! is memorable for sheer idiosyncrasy alone." Robert Firsching, reviewing the film for the Amazing World of Cult Movies, praised the film as "an impressionistic howl of rage and despair from a country which has lived on the brink of war for years, a nightmare without beginning or end. One gets the feeling that it has driven everyone concerned a bit mad, and that is where Goodbye 20th Century! succeeds the most: without showing a single glimpse of actual Balkan fighting, it portrays the horror and insanity of the conflict in a way that a mere war film would be hard-pressed to achieve."

However, Maryann Johanson, writing for The Flick Filosopher, said the film "feels like it was made by a couple of precocious 13-year-old boys obsessed with incest and bullets and splattering blood. This is strictly for those who like their science fiction with a lot of style but very little substance." And James Berardinelli, writing for Reel Views, complained that "Popovski and Mitrevski seem to relish making their movie as off-the-wall as possible, and, while the result may grant them satisfaction, it is likely to have the opposite effect on those who find themselves in a theater watching the final product."

Goodbye 20th Century! was released in the US on VHS video.In February 2023 Vinegar Syndrome released a blu ray edition.

== See also ==
- List of submissions to the 71st Academy Awards for Best Foreign Language Film
- List of Macedonian submissions for the Academy Award for Best Foreign Language Film
