= Bal-Can-Can =

- Bulgarian poster
- Directed by: Darko Mitrevski
- Written by: Darko Mitrevski
- Produced by: Darko Mitrevski; Alessandro Verdecchi; Gianluca Curti; Loris Curci
- Starring: Vlado Jovanovski; Adolfo Margiotta; Zvezda Angelovska
- Cinematography: Suki Medencevic
- Edited by: Giacobbe Gamberini
- Music by: Kiril Džajkovski
- Release date: 2 February 2005
- Running time: 89 minutes
- Country: Macedonia
- Languages: Macedonian; Italian; Serbian; Bulgarian; Croatian; Bosnian; Albanian; English; Russian
- Budget: 1,300,000 €

Bal-Can-Can (Macedonian: Бал-Кан-Кан, transliterated Bal-Kan-Kan) is a 2005 Macedonian action comedy film about a deserter who travels throughout the Balkans as a political immigrant in search of his dead mother-in-law who is wrapped in a carpet.

== Cast ==
Actor	Role
Vlado Jovanovski	Trendafil Karanfilov
Adolfo Margiotta	Santino Genovese
Zvezda Angelovska	Ruža Karanfilova
Branko Đurić	Šefket Ramadani
Seka Sablić	Zumbula
Toni Mihajlovski	Džango
Miodrag Krivokapić	Veselin Kabadajić
Nikola Kojo	Osman Rizvanbegović
Branko Ognjanovski	Serafim Karanfilov
Kiril Pop Hristov	Ćoro
Vasko Todorov	Vitomir
Antonella Troise	Lara

== Production ==
The film was a co-production of Macedonia (now North Macedonia), Italy, Serbia and Montenegro and Britain. The executive producer of the film was Loris Curci. The screenplay was written by Darko Mitrevski, who also directed the film. The director of cinemaphotography was Suki Medencević and the film was edited by Giacobbe Gamberini. Auditions for extras were held in July 2003 in Skopje. The filming happened in September and October.

== Release ==
The film was released in 2005.

=== Reception ===
Dennis Harvey of Variety, commenting on the film, wrote: "Writer-helmer Darko Mitrevski keeps pushing the envelope... The cynical, hallucinatory, modern Pilgrim's Progress is a trip, with memorably out-there sequences sure to build a cult rep among adventuresome cineastes."

=== Box office ===
The film has been the highest-grossing film in North Macedonia, with over 100,000 tickets sold. It was also released in Russia, United Kingdom, Spain, Turkey, Greece, Ukraine, Serbia, Croatia, Bulgaria, Slovenia, Bosnia and Herzegovina.

== Awards and nominations ==
Event	Award	Winner/Nominee	Result
27th Moscow International Film Festival	Special Mention of the Film Critic's Guild of Russia	Darko Mitrevski	Won
27th Moscow International Film Festival	Golden St. George	Darko Mitrevski	Nominated
Motovun Film Festival	Propeller of Motovun - From A to A Award, Best Film In the South-East European Region	Darko Mitrevski	Won
