= Darko Mitrevski =

Macedonian film director

- Born: Skopje, SFR Yugoslavia
- Occupations: Film director, screenwriter

Darko Mitrevski is a Macedonian film director currently living in Los Angeles, California, United States since 2007.

His list of feature films includes Goodbye, 20th Century!, Bal-Can-Can, and The Third Half.
