= Black Seed (film) =

1971 Macedonian drama film by Kiril Cenevski

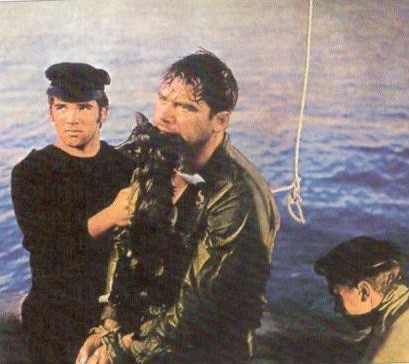
- Scene from the film
- Directed by: Kiril Cenevski
- Written by: Tasko Georgievski; Kiril Cenevski
- Starring: Darko Damevski
- Cinematography: Ljube Petkovski
- Distributed by: Vardar Film
- Release date: 1971
- Running time: 82 minutes
- Country: Yugoslavia
- Language: Macedonian

Black Seed (Macedonian: Црно семе translit. Crno seme) is a 1971 Macedonian language Yugoslav drama film directed by Kiril Cenevski. The film was selected as the Yugoslav entry for the Best Foreign Language Film at the 44th Academy Awards, but was not accepted as a nominee. It was also entered into the 7th Moscow International Film Festival.

The film recounts the story of Macedonian soldiers in the Greek army being transported to prison camps on Greek islands. Suspected of being communists, they are maltreated by the Greek officers running the camp.

== Cast ==
- Darko Damevski as Andon Sovicanov
- Aco Jovanovski as Hristos Soglomov
- Risto Siskov as Paris
- Pavle Vuisić as Maki
- Voja Mirić as Major
- Mite Grozdanov as Marko
- Nenad Milosavljević as Niko

== See also ==
- List of submissions to the 44th Academy Awards for Best Foreign Language Film
- List of Yugoslav submissions for the Academy Award for Best Foreign Language Film
