= Ohrid Summer Festival =

The Ohrid Summer Festival (Macedonian: Охридско лето, romanized: Ohridsko leto) is a festival founded on 4 August 1961, always taking place between 12 July and 20 August in the city of Ohrid, North Macedonia. Originally, the event was initiated and it played an important role in efforts of the Socialist Republic of Macedonia to emancipate and promote Macedonian culture in SFR Yugoslavia and abroad after decades of underfunding, neglect by states that encompassed Macedonia or outright suppression.

The event is funded by the Ministry of Culture of North Macedonia and sponsors. The President of North Macedonia is the patron of the festival. The festival has featured prominent artists since 1961, such as José Carreras. Since 1994, the festival has been a member of the European Festivals Association. Many world-renowned musicians, such as Leonid Kogan, Svyatoslav Richter, Grigory Sokolov, Andre Navarra, Martina Arroyo, Henryk Szeryng, Ivo Pogorelić, Mstislav Rostropovich, Aldo Ciccolini, Gidon Kremer, Ruggiero Ricci, Viktor Tretiakov, Salvatore Accardo, Elena Obraztsova, Katia Ricciarelli, Victoria de los Ángeles, Maxim Vengerov, Vadim Repin, Julian Rachlin, Michel Camilo, Paul Meyer, Dmitri Hvorostovsky, Leo Nucci, Barbara Frittoli, Jessye Norman, Nigel Kennedy, Zubin Mehta, Ennio Morricone, Mikhail Pletnev, as well as many others, have performed at Ohridski Leto.

== See also ==
- Ohrid Fest
