= Secret Ingredient (film) =

2017 Macedonian black comedy film

- Film poster
- Directed by: Gjorce Stavreski
- Written by: Gjorce Stavreski
- Starring: Blagoj Veselinov
- Release date: 9 November 2017 (Thessaloniki IFF)
- Running time: 104 minutes
- Country: Macedonia
- Language: Macedonian

Secret Ingredient (Macedonian: Исцелител, romanized: Iscelitel, lit. 'Healer') is a 2017 Macedonian black comedy film directed by Gjorce Stavreski. It was selected as the Macedonian entry for the Best Foreign Language Film at the 91st Academy Awards, but it was not nominated.

== Premise ==
An underpaid train mechanic gives his father a cake made of stolen marijuana to relieve his cancer pain, but he is cornered by the criminals who are searching for their drugs and the nosy neighbors who want a recipe for the "healing" cake.

== Cast ==
- Blagoj Veselinov as Vele
- Anastas Tanovski as Sazdo
- Aksel Mehmet as Dzhem
- Aleksandar Mikic as Mrsni
- Miroslav Petkovic as Koki

== See also ==
- List of submissions to the 91st Academy Awards for Best Foreign Language Film
- List of Macedonian submissions for the Academy Award for Best Foreign Language Film
