= The Great Water =

2004 film

- The Great Water poster
- Directed by: Ivo Trajkov
- Written by: Zivko Cingo, Ivo Trajkov
- Produced by: Robert Jazadziski
- Starring: Saso Kekenovski; Maja Stankovska
- Cinematography: Suki Medencevic
- Edited by: Atanas Georgiev
- Music by: Kiril Dzajkovski
- Release date: April 30, 2004
- Running time: 93 minutes
- Country: Macedonia
- Language: Macedonian

The Great Water (Macedonian: Γолемата вода, romanized: Golemata voda) is a 2004 Macedonian drama film starring Saso Kekenovski, Maja Stankovska, Mitko Apostolovski, Meto Jovanovski and Verica Nedeska. It was directed and written by Ivo Trajkov. The music was created by Kiril Dzajkovski.

== Plot ==
Based on a children's book written by Živko Čingo in the 1970s, the movie is about the difficult transition in Macedonia after World War II. The film begins in the present as old Lem (Meto Jovanovski), Macedonian politician who is experiencing a heart attack and while he is being wheeled into a hospital and examined and wired, he has memory flashbacks to his childhood in 1945. He is brought to the 'orphanage' where orphans are children of the enemies of the new regime. There he learns how to adjust to the role of obedient brainwashing. He becomes mesmerized by a new kid, Isak, a beautiful and charismatic boy. The struggles quietly underplaying all of the camp surface activity are many: the dichotomy of a Communist ideology removing the Church from existence with a people dependent upon the spiritual values of religion, the Stalin/Tito issue, the adjustments to the policies of Communist regime in a country where fierce national pride had ruled, and the depersonalization of children into political pawns despite the need for role models and the luxury of growing up with friends and confidants.

== Awards ==
The film won the Grand Prize at Valencia Film Festival. It was also Macedonia's submission to the 77th Academy Awards for the Academy Award for Best Foreign Language Film, but it failed to make the nominees shortlist.

== Reception ==
The film received positive reviews from critics. On Rotten Tomatoes it has an approval rating of 71% based on reviews from 21 critics. On Metacritic it has a score of 62 based on reviews from 15 critics, indicating "Generally favorable reviews".
