= Vardar Film =

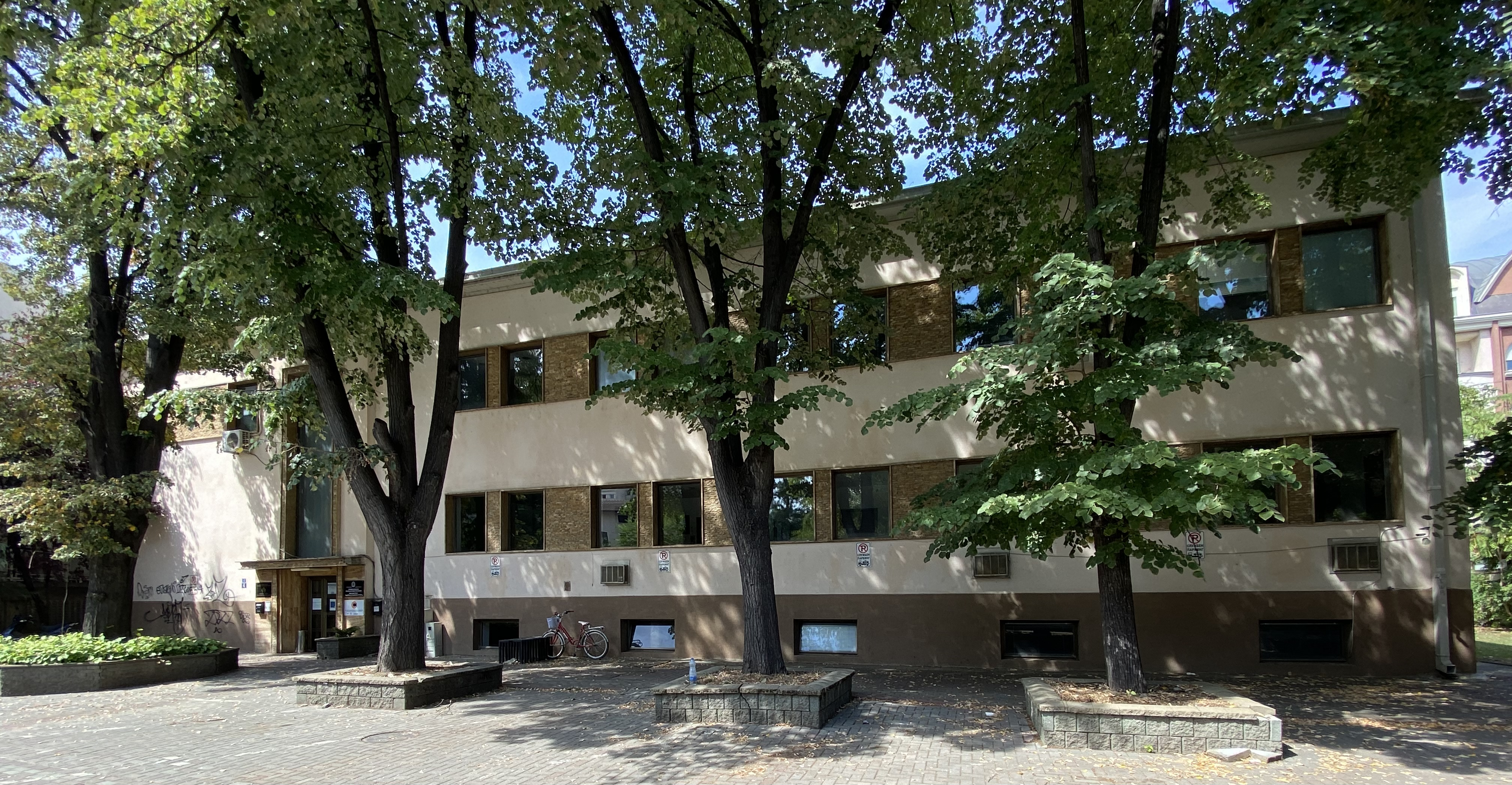
- The building of Vardar Film in Skopje
- Industry: Film
- Predecessor: Vardar Film - Skopje
- Founded: 1947 in Skopje, Yugoslavia
- Founder: Government of the Socialist Republic of Macedonia
- Successor: Vardar Film Macedonia
- Headquarters: Skopje, North Macedonia
- Key people: Arsim Ramadani
- Owner: Government of North Macedonia
- Number of employees: 16
- Website: vardarfilm.mk

Vardar Film (Macedonian: Вардар Филм) is a film production and distribution company based in Skopje, North Macedonia. It began operations in 1947, when North Macedonia was part of the former Yugoslavia.

The company produced the films: Tattoo (1991), Happy New Year '49 (1986), Haj Faj (1987), Tri Ani (1959), The mountain of anger (1968). The studio has made about 700 documentary short and animated films in period from 1947 till 1991. In 2013 the Government of Macedonia has decided to rename the company from Vardar Film Skopje to Vardar Film Macedonia.

== Selected filmography ==
- Frosina (1952)
- Black Seed (1971)
- Happy New Year '49 (1986)
