= Stole Popov =

Macedonian film director (born 1950)

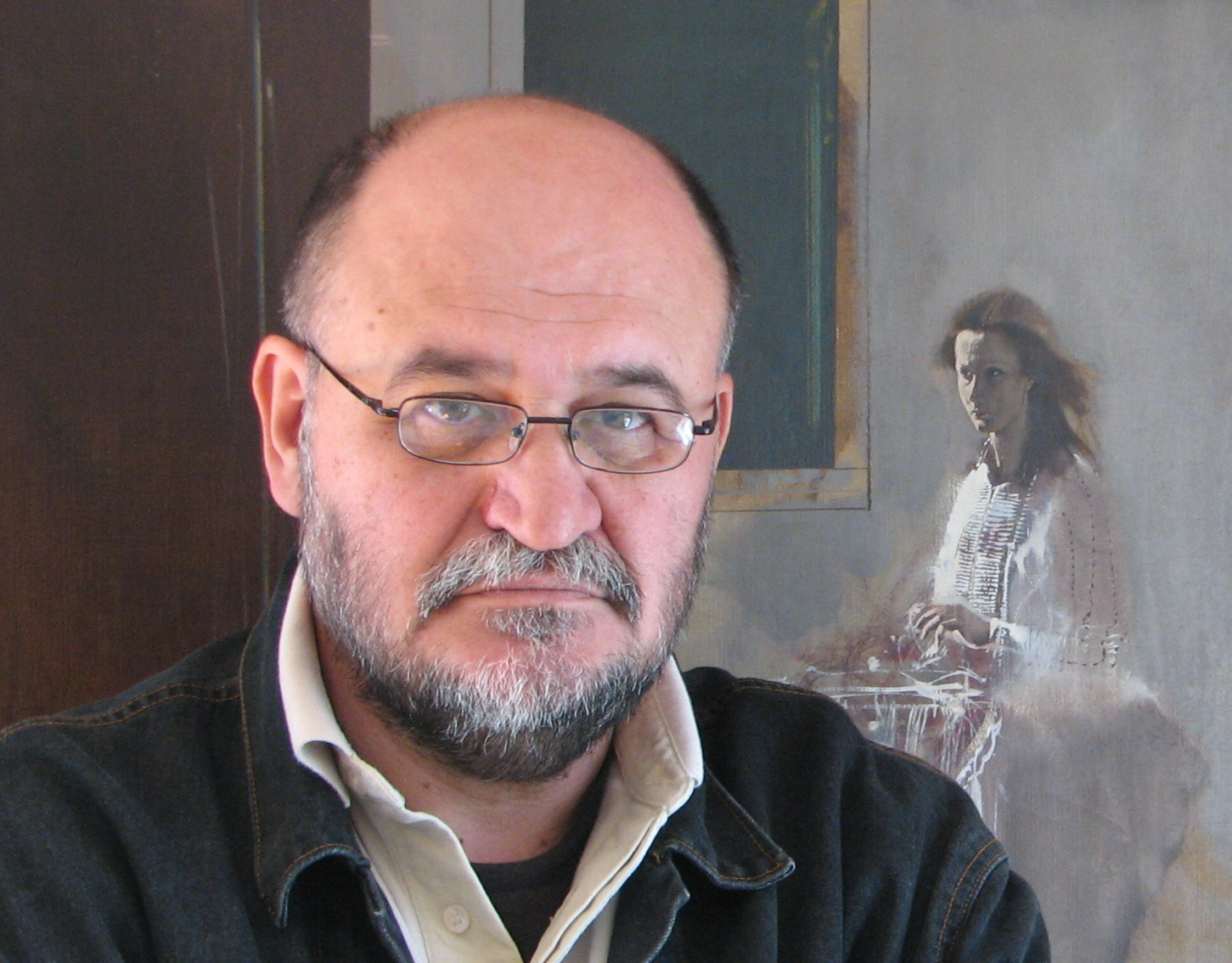
- Born: Stole Popov; 20 August 1950 (age 75); Skopje, Yugoslavia
- Other name: Stole Popov
- Occupation: Film director
- Years active: 1974 – present
- Website: http://stolepopov.com/

Stole Popov (Macedonian: Столе Попов; born 1950) is a Macedonian film director.

== Biography ==
He was born 20 August 1950 in Skopje, Yugoslavia. He graduated film directing at the Academy of Theatre, Film & Television in Belgrade. He is currently a film directing professor at the Faculty of Dramatic Arts in Skopje and chief of Film Directing Studies. Also, he is a member of the European Film Academy since 1997. Stole Popov has won over 50 high European and World Awards and significant recognitions.

== Films ==
- Fire

(documentary) – 1974

Gold Medal – Yugoslav Film Festival, Belgrade; Grand Prix – Tuzla, Bosnia
Yugoslav candidate for Oscar Nomination

- Australia, Australia

(documentary feature film) – 1976

Grand Prix – Gold Medal – Yugoslav Film Festival, Belgrade
Yugoslav candidate for Oscar Nomination

- Dae

(documentary) – 1979

OSCAR Nomination in 1979, American Film Academy
Grand Prix – World Film Festival, Oberhausen, Germany
Grand Prix – Balkan Film Festival- Ljubljana, Slovenia
Silver Boomerang – Melburn, Australia
Gold Medal – Yugoslav Film Festival, Belgrade
Special Diploma – London, England

- The Red Horse

(feature film) 1980

Macedonian Nacional Award, Skopje; International Film Guide ’83 – Best World Selection – London
Film on the Balkans – Anthology of 24 films, Dina Jordanova, London
Farewell Yugoslavia – Viennale ’93, Anthology of 33 films, Vienna

- Happy New '49

(feature film) – 1986

Grand Prix – Golden Arena at the Yugoslav Film Festival - Pula, Croatia
Grand Prix – Porto Alegre, Brasil; Milton Manaki - Critics Award
Golden Gladiator – Award of the Yugoslav Film Academy
Yugoslav candidate for Oscar Nomination
Anthology of Middle European Film – Sasa Petrovic, FEST Belgrade
Farewell Yugoslavia – Viennale ’93, Anthology of 33 films, Vienna
Grand Prix – Yugoslav Actors Film Festival – Nis

- Tattoo

(feature film) – 1992

FELIX Nomination in 1992 - European Film Academy
Grand Prix – Yugoslav Film Festival, Herceg Novi, Montenegro
Grand Prix – Yugoslav Actors Film Festival, Nis
Macedonian candidate for Oscar Nomination
Farewell Yugoslavia – Viennale, 93 Anthology of 33 films, Vienna

- Gypsy Magic

(feature film) – 1997

Grand Prix – Antigone d’Or- Mediterranean Film Festival, Montpellier, France;
Jury Award – International Film Festival, Izmir, Turkey
Best Selection 1997 – European Film Academy, Berlin

- To the Hilt

(feature film) – 2014

== Videos ==
=== Skopje ===
- Skopje Leb i sol – music video, 1987

Grand Prix – Yugoslav Video Festival, Belgrade

=== Gipsy song ===
- Gipsy song Vlatko Stefanovski – music video, 1998

Best Macedonian Music Video – Skopje
