= Bastion (band) =

- Bastion in 1985, from left to right: Ljubomir Stojsavljević, Ana Kostovska and Kiril Džajkovski

Background information
- Origin: Skopje, SFR Yugoslavia
- Genres: Synth-pop; electronic music
- Years active: 1982–1985
- Labels: PGP-RTB
- Past members: Kiril Džajkovski; Toše Pop Simonov; Ana Kostovska; Ljubomir Stojsavljević

Bastion (Macedonian: Бастион) was a Yugoslav synth-pop band formed in Skopje in 1982. Although short-lived, Bastion was a prominent act of the 1980s Yugoslav rock scene.

The band was formed by keyboardist Kiril Džajkovski, guitarist Toše Pop Simonov and vocalist Ana Kostovska, Simonov soon being replaced by bass guitarist Ljubomir Stojsavljević. The band released only one self-titled studio album in 1985, for which the lyrics were written by Milčo Mančevski, later an acclaimed film director. After the group disbanded, Kostovska dedicated herself to her acting career, and Džajkovski joined Leb i Sol, later starting a successful career as an electronic music composer and performer.

== History ==
=== 1983–1987 ===
The band was formed in 1982 in Skopje, SR Macedonia by two former member of the jazz rock band Post Scriptum, keyboardist Kiril Džajkovski and guitarist Toše Pop Simonov. The two were joined vocalist Ana Kostovska, who was at the time a drama student. Toše Pop Simonov was soon replaced by bass guitarist Ljubomir Stojsavljević. Džajkovski, Kostovska and Stojsavljević recorded the band's debut album, entitled simply Bastion and released in 1985 through PGP-RTB. Music was composed by Džajkovski and Stojsavljević, and the lyrics were written by Milčo Mančevski, at that time a New York City correspondent for the magazines Džuboks and Zdravo. Mančevski also directed the music video for the band's song "Hot Day in Mexico". The songs on the album were in Serbo-Croatian, but the band had also recorded several songs in their native Macedonian for the music production of the national Radio-Television Skopje. Bastion ended their activity soon after the album release.

=== Post breakup ===
After Bastion disbanded, Ana Kostovska dedicated herself to her acting career, occasionally making guest appearances on the albums by other Yugoslav acts. She appeared as vocalist on the albums by Leb i Sol, Riblja Čorba, Vlatko Stefanovski and The No Smoking Orchestra.

Kiril Džajkovski joined Leb i Sol, recording the album Kao kakao (Like Cacao, 1987) and Putujemo (We're Travelling, 1990) with them. He started his solo career with the album Synthetic Theatre, released in 1996. During the 1990s, he occasionally performed with the Australian band Kismet, formed by Mizar member Gorazd Čapovski. With Vlada Divljan, Džajkovski recorded the albums Dekada (Decade, 1997) and Recorded Supplement (1997) under the name Apartchicks. During the following years, he released a number of electronic music albums and wrote music for theatre and film. He cooperated with Mančevski's on his films Dust (2001), Shadows (2007) and Willow (2019).

Works and Rew>>works cover

In 2006, PMG Recordings released the album Works and Rew>>works. The album featured remastered version of the Bastion's only album, as well as covers of the band's songs by Foltin, Superhiks and other Macedonian bands. In 2018, Bastion's only album was re-released on vinyl and with a new cover by the British record label ACC Music.

== Discography ==
=== Studio albums ===
- Bastion (1985)

=== Compilation albums ===
- Works and Rew>>works (2006)

== See also ==
- Music of North Macedonia
- SFR Yugoslav Pop and Rock scene
