= Mothers (2010 film) =

2010 film

- Directed by: Milcho Manchevski
- Written by: Milcho Manchevski
- Produced by: Christina Kallas
- Starring: Ana Stojanovska
- Cinematography: Vladimir Samoilovski
- Edited by: Zaklina Stojcevska
- Music by: Igor Vasilev Novogradska
- Release date: 12 September 2010
- Country: North Macedonia
- Language: Macedonian

Mothers (Macedonian: Мајки, romanized: Majki) is a 2010 Macedonian drama film by Milcho Manchevski. An international co-production, the film mingles fiction with documentary.

== Premise ==
Three stories, all true, one real. Employing an innovative structure, the three stories in Mothers highlight the delicate relationship of truth and fiction, of drama and documentary. What is the nature of truth? The film eschews neat narrative devices and pushes to confront their own definitions of filmic reality.

The three stories focus on three aspects of life in contemporary North Macedonia (a city, a small town and a deserted village). Mothers, whose motto is “The Truth Hurts” explores the nature of truth – all three stories (two fiction and one documentary) are based on real events, but only one - the most incredible - is told as documentary. This story examines the unsolved mystery of the Kichevo serial killer who murdered several retired cleaning women. A crime reporter who covered the stories was arrested, and two days later he was found dead with his head in a bucket of water. A suicide note was found in his cell.

== Cast ==
- Ana Stojanovska as Ana
- Ratka Radmanovic as Grandma
- Salaetin Bilal as Grandpa
- Vladimir Jacev as Kole
- Maria Kozhevnikova
- Dimitar Gjorgjievski as Simon
- Irina Apelgren as Salina
- Emilija Stojkovska as Bea
- Milijana Bogdanoska as Kjara
- Dime Ilijev as Sergeant Janeski
- Marina Pankova as Mrs. Matilda
- Goran Trifunovski as Zoki
- Petar Mircevski as Raspusto
- Blagoja Spirkovski-Dzumerko as Laze
- Boris Corevski as Baterija
- Tamer Ibrahim as Officer Iljov

== Production ==
Mothers is international co-production, that mingles fiction with documentary.

The film was written and directed by Milcho Manchevski, and produced by Christina Kallas. Vladimir Samoilovski was the director of photography, David Munns was the production designer, Zaklina Stojcevska edited the film, and the music was composed by Igor Vasilev - Novogradska. Principal photography took place in three areas in North Macedonia: Mariovo, Kicevo and Skopje, North Macedonia.

== Release ==
Mothers premiered at the Toronto International Film Festival and had its European premiere in the Panorama section of the 61st Berlin International Film Festival.

== Reception ==
=== Critical reception ===
Natasha Senjanovic of The Hollywood Reporter said "Manchevski mixes fiction with documentary in a film that hits home on an emotional rather than intellectual level".

Diego Pierini writing in LoudVision said Mothers is a very strange film, sometimes sophisticated, poignant and often elliptical.[...] One of the most interesting and original filmmakers of recent years [...] One of those authors who are not afraid to face the genres and to push the boundaries.

=== Awards ===
The film won the following awards:

- Minsk International Film Festival Listapad: "Award for Film as Art Phenomenon", 2011
- Directing award – LIFFE 2011
- European Film Committee recommendation - 24th EFA Film Awards invitation, 2011
- Cinema City Festival: FEDEORA (Federation of Film Critics of Europe and the Mediterranean), 2011
- FEST: Critics Award for Best FEST Film “Nebojsa Djukelic”, 2011
- FEST: Special Jury Prize in the selection "Europe Out of Europe", 2011
- MTV Adria Movie Awards: Best Movie nomination, 2011
- Macedonian Academy Award Submission: Best Foreign-Language Film, 2010

== See also ==
- List of submissions to the 83rd Academy Awards for Best Foreign Language Film
- List of Macedonian submissions for the Academy Award for Best Foreign Language Film
