= The End of Time (2017 film) =

- Directed by: Milcho Manchevski
- Cinematography: Alain López Martínez
- Edited by: Kristina Pozenel
- Music by: Igor Vasilev Novogradska
- Release date: April 5, 2017 (Aspen Shortsfest)
- Countries: United States; Cuba

The End of Time is a 2017 experimental short film by Milcho Manchevski, a U.S.-Cuban co-production.

== Background ==
The End of Time is an experimental film about that one hypnotic moment on a regular, unassuming Tuesday when one realizes that time has stopped and the universe has been sucked into a single smile.

== Production ==
Principal photography took place in San Antonio de los Baños, Cuba. Post-production was completed in New York City and Macedonia. Cinematography by Alain López Martínez, edited by Kristina Pozenel, music and sound design by Igor Vasilev Novogradska, visual effects by Misho Ristov Rex, and color grading by Michael Dwass.

== Release ==
The End of Time premiered at Aspen Shortsfest, where it won the Ellen Award.

== Critical reception ==
This is what the critics had to say about The End of Time:
THE END OF TIME is an impressive minimalist phenomenology of time, consciousness and selfhood. Subtle art stratification of the awareness of the duration of a multitude of timelines within a film frame and the distillation of a pure emotion. A sunny Cuban afternoon on a street in San Antonio de los Baños, the fictitious mise-en-scène gradually breaks down, fragmenting into a crystalline pictorial structure with a disrhythmic duration of the whole, a micro-image archipelago with unequal deceleration of the parts. The quest for a fixed point hypnotizes and displaces the normal conditions of the perception of time.

THE END OF TIME, a winner of the prestigious Ellen Award at one of the most renowned short film festivals in Aspen, as well as the award at the Jihlava International Documentary Film Festival in Czech Republic, is incredibly attractive cinematic and artistic playfulness, an experimental transcendental journey to something we are very familiar with, but in the same time remains very difficult to grasp, to those rare and timeless moments when we feel truly ourselves, truly at home.

(Dejan Zdravkov, FFF 2018)

== Festivals and awards ==
- Tirana Film Festival - Best Art Video and Experimental Film
- San Gio Film Festival - Best Editor
- Aspen Shortfest - Ellen Award
- Arizona Film Festival
- Palm Springs International Shortfest
- Short Shorts Film Festival and Asia
- Festival International du Film Nancy Lorraine
- Festival International de Curtametraxes de Bueu
- Odense International Film Festival OFF17
- Festival International du film Nancy-Lorraine
- Oaxaca Film Festival
- Buffalo International Film Festival
- 68th Montecatini International Short Film Festival
- Manaki Brothers International Cinematographer's Film Festival
- São Paulo International Film Festival
- St. Louis International Film Festival
- Ji.hlava International Documentary Film Festival - Special Mention
- Bogota International Short Film Festival
- Alternative Film/Video Festival
- Berlin Experimental Film Festival
- Minimalen Short Film Festival

== Additional screenings ==
- Manchevski's "Dreaming a Wu Yan Poem" art exhibition - Shanghai, China
- Manchevski's Master Class at Herceg Novi International Film Festival, Montenegro
- Milcho Manchevski retrospective at the International Motivational Film Festival - Bridge of Arts, Rostov on Don, Russia
- Kino Palais Buenos Aires
- Kultivator Kino Karposh
