= Kočani nightclub fire =

2025 fire in North Macedonia

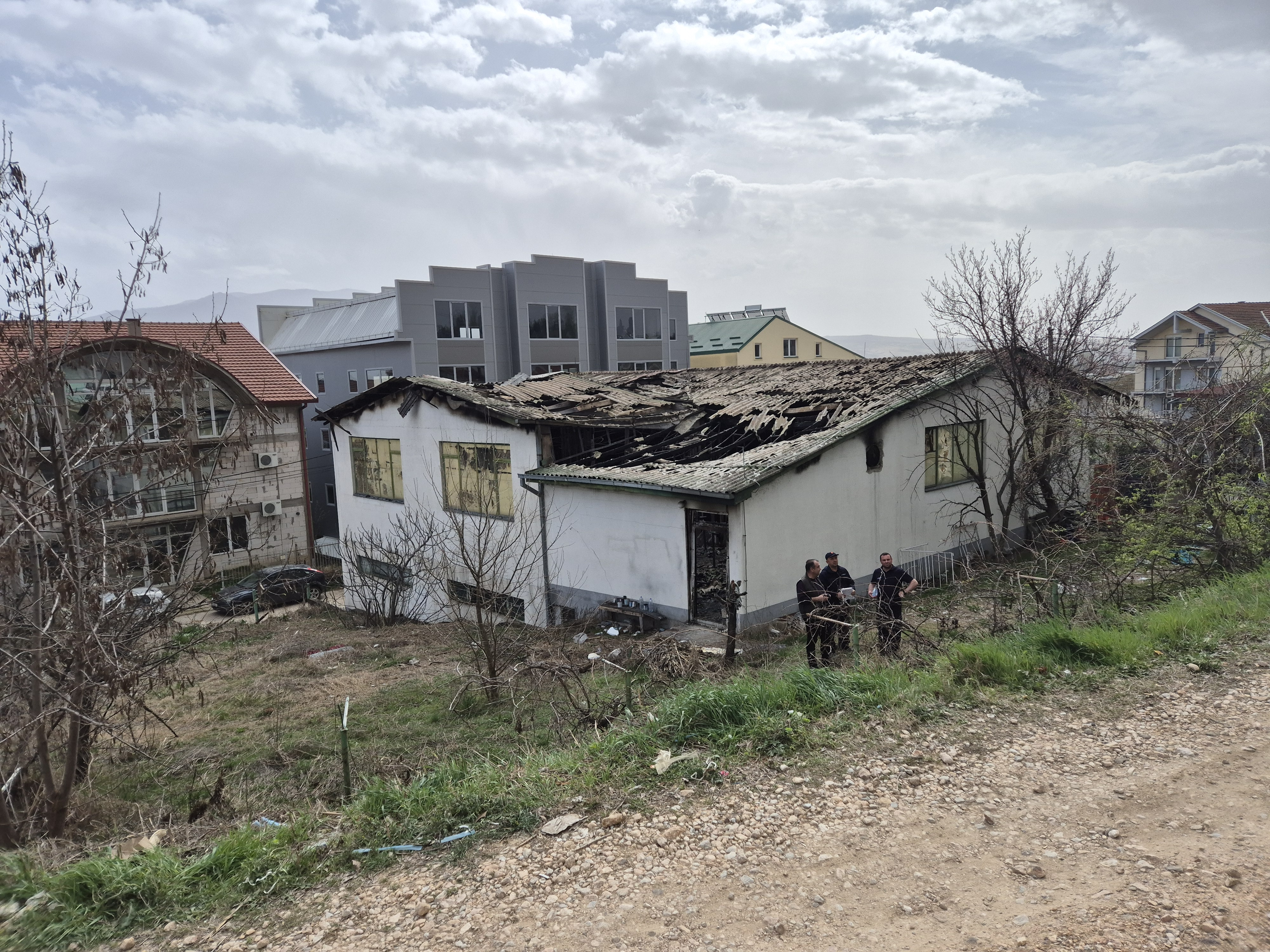
- Remains of the Pulse nightclub in Kočani, North Macedonia, where the fire took place
- Date: 16 March 2025
- Time: 2:35 am (UTC +1)
- Venue: Pulse nightclub
- Location: Kočani, North Macedonia; 41°54′18″N 22°23′42″E
- Cause: Pyrotechnics
- Participants: c. 650
- Deaths: 63
- Injuries: 193

On 16 March 2025, a fire at the Pulse nightclub in Kočani, North Macedonia, killed 63 people and injured 193. The fire started when sparks from indoor fireworks hit the ceiling and set it alight, rapidly enveloping the venue in thick and toxic smoke. The nightclub was unlicensed and broke numerous safety standards: among other things, it lacked sprinklers and sufficient emergency exits and only had a single fire extinguisher. Rescue efforts were hampered by the nightclub's location in a densely populated neighbourhood, which caused firetrucks difficulty in reaching it.

Local hospitals were severely ill-equipped to deal with the influx of victims, with some left lying in the street due to an insufficient number of ambulances. Many of them suffered severe burns, smoke inhalation, and crush injuries after the crowd rushed for the exits. In response to the fire, the European Union (EU) activated its Civil Protection Mechanism to coordinate the air evacuation of victims, many of whom were transported for treatment in EU member states.

As of March 2025, it is the deadliest nightclub fire in Europe since the 2015 Bucharest nightclub fire and the deadliest fire in North Macedonia's history. The government ordered a three-day inspection of all nightclubs and cabarets in the country, and many entertainment venues were shut down. Government officials, including several ministers and police officers, were arrested as part of the investigation into how the nightclub was given a licence. Vigils and tributes were organised nationwide. In the aftermath of the disaster, there were numerous anti-corruption protests.

== Background ==
The nightclub was situated in a building formerly used as a carpet warehouse. It was described as an "improvised nightclub" by local reporters and, according to authorities, did not have a legal licence to operate but had been doing so for several years before the fire. According to interior minister Panče Toškovski, the building was only certified for light industry and not catering. One resident of Kočani, who had worked there 20 years prior when it housed a textile factory, said she was surprised that such a small building could fit 500 people.

== Fire ==
At 2:35 am on 16 March 2025, about 650 people were attending a concert of Macedonian hip-hop duo DNK in the Pulse Nightclub, although only 250 tickets were sold. The club was filled with twice its legal capacity. Perpendicular sparkling gerbs, a type of indoor firework, were lit by DNK during their performance at approximately 2:32 am. Their sparks ignited flammable acoustic foam sheets that burnt across the roof structure, rapidly engulfing the entire venue in flames and toxic smoke.

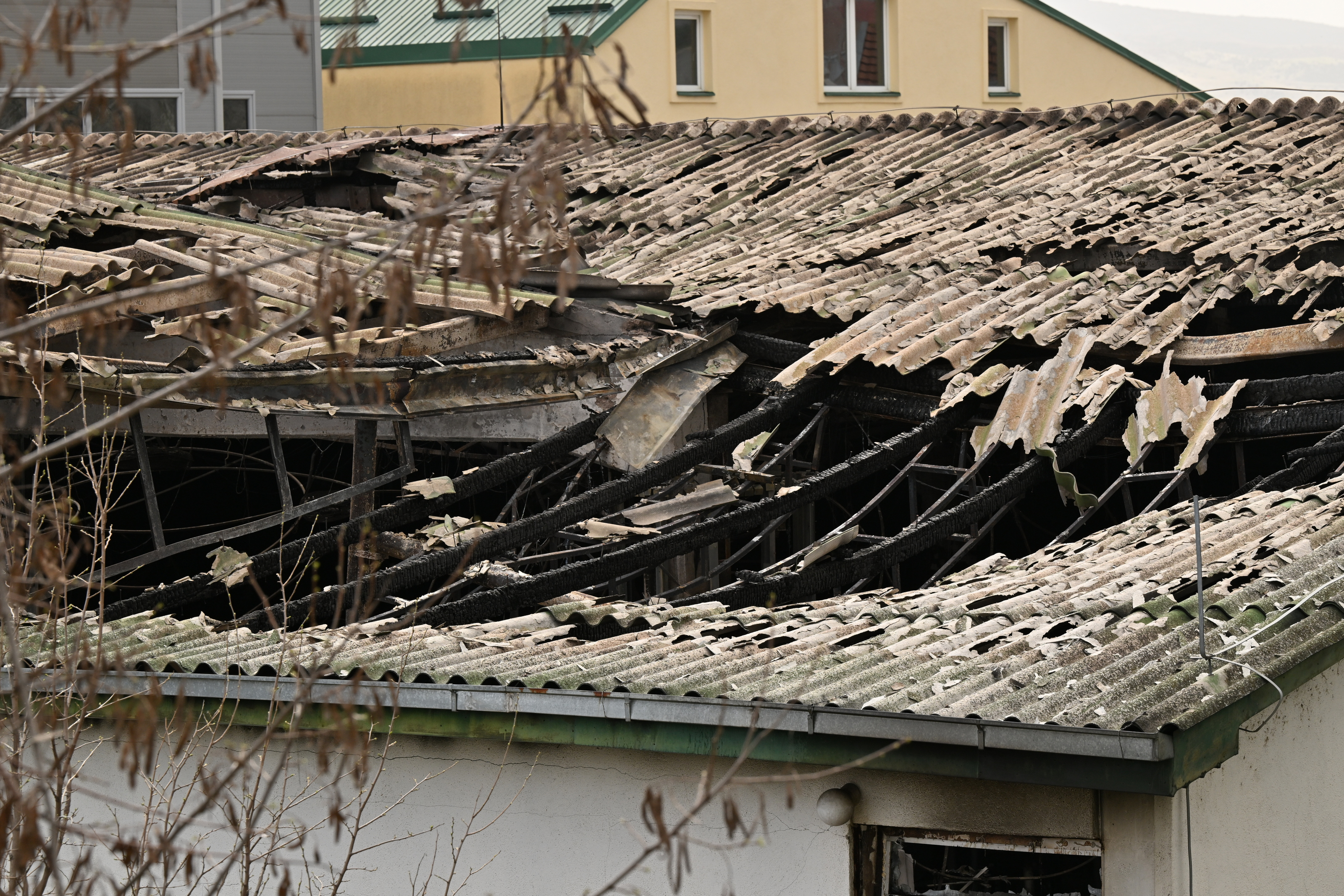
The collapsed roof of the nightclub

Videos of the pyrotechnics and subsequent fire showed attempts to extinguish the flames, with some patrons observing the firefighting while others evacuated. One survivor said that she shouted at a group of children to leave the disco, but they laughed at her. Survivors reported a crowd crush when people rushed towards the club exits, and some victims were trampled to death while trying to escape the club. One survivor described being trampled by the crowd after falling down the stairs. A band member urged the crowd to evacuate during the firefighting, stating: "Everyone get out, we'll be back". Some of the victims attempted to escape through the club's bathroom but were met with barred windows. A 19-year-old, Jovan Kostadinov, rescued 21 people from the club.

The first call to emergency services was received at 2:48 am. Fire crews from nearby cities were also deployed. The rescue efforts were hampered by the inability of firetrucks to access the nightclub, as it was located in a densely populated neighbourhood. Authorities rushed dozens of injured people to nearby hospitals in Štip, Kočani and Skopje.

== Casualties ==
=== Deaths ===
At least 63 people aged between 16 and 48 died from the fire, with six victims being minors. (Note: The age of majority in North Macedonia is 18.) This was the deadliest nightclub fire in Europe since the 2015 Bucharest nightclub fire (also caused by pyrotechnics) and the deadliest fire in North Macedonia's history. A hospital director in Kočani, Kristina Serafimovska, said most of the dead suffered injuries from the stampede of people trying to escape the club. Per the director of the Institute of Forensic Medicine, Aleksandar Stankov, the main causes of death of 59 victims were "violent asphyxiation from carbon monoxide poisoning, ambient asphyxiation, compressive asphyxiation and thermal damage to the respiratory organs", while 4 died from damage to the lungs and burns. Many victims were difficult to identify due to their lack of identification cards, with only half of them possessing identity documents. Ile Gocevski, an ambulance driver in Kočani who was transporting victims to the hospital through the day, died in his sleep on 17 March, a day after the fire, after he returned home to rest. He died of a heart attack caused by overexertion after completing 11 hospital runs overnight. A colleague wrote a social media post calling Macedonian ambulance drivers overworked and underpaid and praising Gocevski's actions. Macedonian Minister of Health Arben Taravari responded to the post, pledging to improve the working conditions and pay of ambulance drivers, and said that their work is often overlooked.

Andrej Gjorgjieski, one of DNK's lead singers, was confirmed dead along with the band's photographer Aleksandar Efremov, backing singer Sara Projkovska, drummer Gjorgji Gjorgiev, and keyboard player Filip Stevanovski. Two other band members survived the initial fire but died later in the afternoon. Vladimir Blažev, the other lead singer, suffered burns to his face and hands and was provided with oxygen therapy; he was the only survivor from DNK. He later died on 14 October, succumbing to his injuries, and raising the number of deaths to 63. Shortly after the fire, rumours spread on social media that Gjorgjieski was alive and receiving treatment at his home, but his wife denied them and requested that social media outlets refrain from posting misinformation and for her and her family's privacy to be respected. Per witnesses and his manager, Gjorgjieski returned to rescue the people inside the club and died when the roof collapsed upon him, killing him instantly. Another backing singer, Ana Kostadinovska, was injured in the fire and received treatment at her home; she was initially reported missing.

A police officer at the club checking for drugs and minors died as a result of the fire. KF Shkupi football player Andrej Lazarov suffered from smoke inhalation and burn injuries while trying to rescue club patrons and died a short time after in the hospital. Lazarov's mother said that he suffocated after falling off a bench in a hospital in Štip while waiting for treatment. Damjan Taneski (a young football goalkeeper from Štip) and Petar Ivanovski (a basketball player for Basket Dino Delicacies from Kočani) were also among the victims of the fire.

Parents of some of the victims said that hospitals did not provide adequate medical attention to their children, leading to their deaths. A mother of a victim said that she was informed that her daughter was being treated in Skopje, but when she and her family arrived there, they were told she was actually in a hospital in Kočani. They were blocked from entering the room by the police and later learnt of her death. According to the mother, oxygen had likely not been administered to her daughter, even though she was in critical condition, since the Kočani hospital did not have any supply of medicinal oxygen.

=== Injuries ===
193 people were injured, including 20 minors. At least 72 people were hospitalised within North Macedonia, with some of those being hospitalised in Kočani and Štip, while 101 others were confirmed to have been taken abroad for treatment. Besides those, some were transported to the hospitals of Skopje. This includes 17 with severe burns who were taken to the St. Naum of Ohrid hospital, 49 to the Clinical Centre of Skopje, and 18 to the September 8 General Hospital, two of whom were in critical condition. The Kočani regional hospital was severely unequipped for the influx of victims, having only two ambulances and one van with a bed. Radio Kočani reported that the injured were left lying in the street, since there were not enough emergency vehicles to transport them all. Some of the victims were transported to the hospital by civilian bystanders. A brother of one of the victims said that there were corpses in the hospital corridors, and he had to step over them to check on his injured sister.

Due to the severity of the injuries as a result of burns and smoke inhalation, some of the injured were transferred to specialised units at hospitals and clinics in Skopje and Štip. By 17 March, all of the remaining patients at the Kočani general hospital had been transferred to clinics in Skopje. Since the drywall installed on the ceiling of the nightclub contained asbestos, a carcinogen, Minister of Health Taravari instructed the injured and anyone else who was at the scene of the fire to see a doctor because they may have inhaled the asbestos. (Note: According to Meri Cvetkovska, a professor of civil engineering at the Ss. Cyril and Methodius University of Skopje, theories that the asbestos burnt are not true, as asbestos breaks under heat instead of burning.) Doctor Bojan Trajkovski said that anyone who was inside the nightclub should be monitored for signs of mesothelioma for the rest of their lives.

On 16 and 17 March, some of the more severely injured persons were transferred to hospitals in other countries; nine patients were transported to Turkey (three to Istanbul and six to Ankara), and 14 patients were transported to Bulgaria (eight to Sofia and three each to Varna and Plovdiv). Five people were transferred to Thessaloniki, Greece. Twenty-nine of the injured were sent to four different hospitals in Serbia (Military Medical Academy and Clinical Centre of Serbia in Belgrade, as well as Niš Military Hospital and the Clinical Centre of Niš). Four patients were sent to Lithuania and two each to Budapest, Hungary, and Vienna, Austria. On 18 March, two patients were transported to Zagreb, Croatia, for further treatment. Four injured patients were transported to hospitals in Italy on a special Italian Air Force flight that landed in Milan. One of the patients in Lithuania died on 4 April, while a second patient died on 7 April.

On the evening of 17 March, Serbian president Aleksandar Vučić visited the injured at the Clinical Centre of Serbia in Belgrade together with health minister Zlatibor Lončar and eleven photojournalists. The citizens of North Macedonia and Serbia on social media accused Vučić of using the occasion for PR and scoring political points. Vučić was photographed touching a patient with his bare hands and later took off his medical mask while speaking to the press in front of a patient. Similarly, Macedonian Prime Minister Hristijan Mickoski, accompanied by several other officials, visited the injured in Skopje hospitals on the evening of 17 March and again on 18 March, before their families were allowed to see them, and without proper safety measures. One man in Mickoski's company was seen without a mask.

=== International medical assistance ===
In response to the disaster, the European Union activated its Civil Protection Mechanism and coordinated air evacuation. On 16 March, Bulgaria sent an Alenia C-27J Spartan military aircraft to transport eight of the most critically wounded victims to the Pirogov Hospital in Sofia and the Military Medical Academy in Varna, while six more were transported with ambulances to Sofia and Plovdiv. The director of the Pirogov Hospital said that she expects the death toll to rise, as all the victims of the fire that they have received are in "very poor condition", suffering burns to their respiratory tracts. On 18 March, one more patient was admitted for treatment in Pirogov Hospital, and the Macedonian authorities were offered to admit ten more people for treatment. That same day, the Bulgarian Red Cross, Pirogov Hospital, and the National Center for Transfusion Hematology organised a blood donation campaign to help the injured in Bulgaria, supported by the Military Medical Academy. By 19 March, more than 600 Bulgarians had donated blood in three cities for the victims of the fire.

On 16 March, Serbia sent a CASA C-295 of the Serbian Air Force to pick up 12 of the most critically injured victims, who were transported to the Military Medical Academy and the Clinical Centre of Serbia. Additionally, Serbia sent five ambulances with 14 medical personnel to assist crowded hospitals in North Macedonia. Two ambulances drove two of the most critically injured to Niš, where they were admitted to the Clinical Centre of Niš and the Niš Military Hospital, and three other ambulances drove to Belgrade, where an additional three injured were admitted to the Military Medical Academy and the Clinical Centre of Serbia. An anaesthesiologist at the Military Medical Academy, Goran Rondović, said that both patients that they received were in critical condition but stable. Out of ten patients transported to the Military Medical Academy, six were in the intensive care unit and four were receiving reconstructive surgery. As of 19 March, 30 of the most critically injured are being treated in Serbian hospitals, transported via both air and ground.

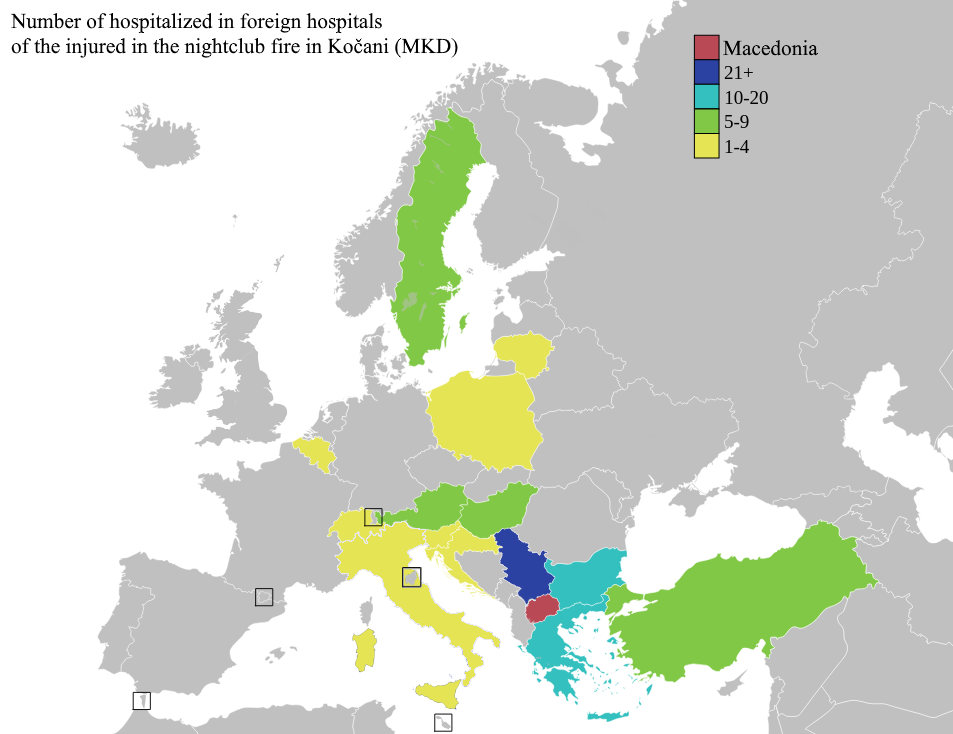
Number of international hospitalisations from the Kočani nightclub fire

A Romanian Air Force C-27J Spartan aircraft, configured for medical missions, departed on 17 March from Otopeni to carry out a humanitarian mission to transport four patients diagnosed with burns from Skopje to a hospital in Vilnius, Lithuania, including Aleksandar Karadakoski, a bartender at the nightclub, who later died of his injuries. Three more victims were transported to Turkey and another three to Greece. In the Netherlands, burn centres in Groningen, Beverwijk, and Rotterdam committed to providing medical assistance and shelter to victims. Slovenia sent a military aircraft to transport two burn victims to the Ljubljana University Medical Centre, with another two being transported to the Maribor University Medical Centre. On 17 March, a Hellenic Air Force C-130 aircraft transported three critically injured victims in intensive care to a military hospital in Athens. According to Greek Minister of Health Adonis Georgiadis, three hospitals in Athens and one in Thessaloniki were put on heightened alert. That same day, three flights took place from Vogler Air Force Base to Skopje with an Austrian Air Force Medevac C-130 Hercules to hospitals in Graz and Vienna.

Croatian Prime Minister Andrej Plenković announced on 17 March that two Croatian Army helicopters would transport four of the wounded on 19 March to Croatia for treatment. On 17 March, Czechia announced the deployment of ten military medical personnel from the Central Military Hospital to North Macedonia after it requested assistance. On 18 March, Poland announced that it would provide care for two injured people at the Eastern Center for Burn Treatment and Reconstructive Surgery in Łęczna, with the transport of patients carried out by the Polish Medical Air Rescue. Belgium deployed its Belgian First Aid and Support team (B-FAST) to provide emergency medical aid to the victims of the fire on 19 March, taking four patients. On 20 March, an additional three victims of the fire were airlifted to the Başakşehir Çam and Sakura City Hospital in Istanbul. On 20 March, Spain announced that it would treat seven of the victims in Madrid, with five being transported to Hospital Universitario La Paz and two going to the University Hospital of Getafe. On the same day, the Norwegian Armed Forces Joint Medical Services transported seven patients to Spain for hospital treatment in a plane requisitioned from Scandinavian Airlines.

=== Funerals ===
The funerals of the victims were held on 20 March in Štip, Kočani, and Obleševo. The funeral in Kočani was officiated by Stefan, Archbishop of Ohrid and Macedonia and head of the Macedonian Orthodox Church, and was restricted to the relatives of the victims. The beginning of the ceremony was briefly interrupted after some mourners fainted. Among the deceased members of DNK, Gjorgjieski was buried in the Butel municipal cemetery, Projkovska in Gorno Lisiče, and Gjorgiev in Strumica, while Stevanovski, Kolarov and Efremov were buried in Štip.

The Agency for Audio and Audiovisual Media Services (AVMU) requested that the media "adhere to the highest professional and ethical standards" while reporting on the funerals and said that the media should refrain from photographing the graves or violating mourners' privacy. The North Macedonian government condemned unnamed foreign media outlets which they alleged "crossed every line of humanity and dignity in reporting on the tragic funeral in Kočani". The Independent Journalists' Association of Serbia (NUNS) condemned the use of footage of "graves, close family members, and private moments" of the victims by the Serbian media outlets Republika, Kurir, Blic, Alo!, Telegraf, and Mondo, and requested the Serbian Ministry of Information and Telecommunications take action. NUNS said that the coverage was a violation of the Serbian Journalists' Code of Ethics, which forbids "reporting on funerals of private individuals", and that such coverage "is not in the public interest". The Ministry of Information and Telecommunications condemned the footage in a statement and publicly ordered the aforementioned media outlets to immediately remove it from their websites, saying that the media outlets "violated the dignity of the victims, caused anxiety among their relatives and the entire public, and demonstrated a lack of awareness of the need to respect elementary professional standards". The funeral of Vladimir Blažev occurred on 16 October in Skopje.

== Investigation ==
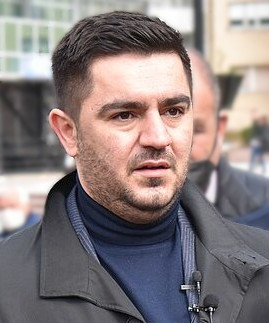
Kreshnik Bekteshi, former Minister of Economy, was one of the politicians arrested as part of the investigation.

An inspection after the fire revealed deficiencies in the building's fire-extinguishing and lighting systems. Additionally, only one effective exit was identified in the building, because the venue's back door was locked. Apart from being locked, the back door did not have a handle on the inside, was covered with drywall, and was lined with flammable soundproofing materials. The building was made of flammable drywall, had no fire alarms, and only had a single fire extinguisher. The building did not have a trip switch.

North Macedonia's Interior Minister, Panče Toškovski, said that the nightclub's operating licence was obtained as a result of corruption and bribery. Later reports simply referred to the nightclub as unlicensed. Toškovski said that the homes of two former Ministry of Economy employees were searched, and technical equipment, documentation, weapons, and ammunition were seized. On 18 March, Toškovski said that local police from Štip and Veles that were investigating the fire would be replaced with officers from Skopje to ensure that the "process proceeds without pressure, suspicion, or undue influence", but added that the decision does not "imply guilt" upon the local police officers. The government ordered a three-day inspection of all nightclubs and cabarets in the country. An inspection at the Pulse Nightclub found significant safety violations:

- The venue lacked basic fire safety equipment, including sufficient fire extinguishers and a functional fire alarm system.
- The club had only one accessible exit, as the back door was locked, severely hindering evacuation efforts during the fire.
- The building had undergone unauthorised modifications, including the use of illegal soundproofing materials, which may have contributed to the rapid spread of the fire.

At a press conference on 17 March, Prime Minister Hristijan Mickoski announced that only 12 legal licences for nightclubs had been issued throughout the country, and the Pulse Nightclub was not one of them. Just one day later, the government spokesperson announced that there were 22 legal licences out of 50 inspected establishments. A further 15 of the 50 did not have licences or had expired licences. As a result, many nightclubs and entertainment venues were shut down. Three licensed nightclubs were closed down, and their licences were revoked after investigations found numerous deficiencies. Police visited all 12 companies in North Macedonia that are licensed to handle pyrotechnics. On 20 March, the state public prosecutor, Ljupčo Kocevski, said there is an ongoing investigation into "bribery, illegalities in the procurement of pyrotechnics, and several other crimes".

Former Ministry of Economy State Secretary Razmena Čekić Đurović was arrested after investigators discovered she signed the forged licence the nightclub was operating under. Authorities confirmed that the Pulse Nightclub's licence document was not found in the government's licence database, even though it was issued on official government stationery and was signed by employees of the Ministry of Economy. The owner of the nightclub, Dejan Jovanov, was arrested, as were his son, wife, and daughter. Jovanov's residence, vehicle, and businesses were searched by police, and electronic devices and "documentation" found in his home were seized. On 20 March, seven police officers were arrested for having allegedly "prepared, signed, and approved" a consent form for the nightclub to obtain a catering licence, even though the club did not meet the minimum requirements to do so. Seven additional police officers were arrested on 15 April, all of them either employees of the Štip department of the Ministry of Internal Affairs or Kočani police. Five of the officers were retired, while two were still working for the Ministry of Internal Affairs. Three former mayors of Kočani – Ratko Dimitrovski, Nikolčo Iliev, and Ljupčo Papazov (who had resigned after the fire) – were arrested on 20 March under suspicion of involvement with the illegal operations of the nightclub. They were charged with failing to prevent the nightclub from continuing to illegally operate. As of 17 April 2025, Dimitrovski, Iliev, and Papazov are under house arrest. Papazov was initially imprisoned.

On 17 March, former State Market Inspectorate Director Goran Trajkovski was also arrested. On the same day, former Minister of Economy Kreshnik Bekteshi was arrested, questioned at a Skopje police station, and brought to testify before a pre-trial judge, though Bekteshi's wife claims that he turned himself in instead of being arrested. Toškovski said that the Ministry of Internal Affairs would file criminal charges against Bekteshi after the investigation is completed. On 25 March, the nightclub owner's wife and daughter were arrested. On 12 April, former Ministers of Economy Valon Saraçini and Bekim Neziri and Director of the Directorate for Protection and Rescue Šaban Saliu were arrested.

In April, 52 people and three companies were under investigation. On 1 May, Kocevski announced that Vladimir Blažev, who was the only surviving member of DNK, was a suspect in the investigation for allegedly illegally importing pyrotechnics into North Macedonia. On 7 May, Kocevski announced the expansion of the investigation to 70 suspects. The investigation concluded on 30 May.

=== Responses ===
The Democratic Union for Integration (DUI), a political party representing the interests of the Albanian ethnic minority in North Macedonia, expressed doubt in the legality and impartiality of the investigation, especially regarding its methodology, possible governmental interference in the prosecutor's office, and politically motivated arrests. DUI later stated that the investigation was "a sui generis example of legal improvisation, driven not by law, but by a desire for applause" and said that the legal system was being "abuse[d]". In particular, they criticised the withdrawal of a public prosecutor from the investigation and the release of most of the suspects from prison, except for Kreshnik Bekteshi, whom they called a long-time victim of "political retaliation".

Bogdanka Kuzeska, spokesperson for the Social Democratic Union of Macedonia (SDSM), accused Toškovski of conducting the investigation "selectively" by only arresting former VMRO-DPMNE officials, none of whom were in office after 2022. She said that Toškovski was attempting to "protect current high-ranking officials, public servants, and chiefs" who failed to prevent the fire; in particular, the head of the Internal Affairs Directorate in Kočani, Marija Cvetkovska Manevska, and the Kočani police chief, Tomo Donev, neither of whom were arrested. Аn SDSM MP, Slavjanka Petrovska, accused Toškovski of using his legal skills (he is an experienced lawyer) to "contaminat[e] and obstruct" the investigation to conceal possible Ministry of Internal Affairs involvement in the failure to prevent the fire and said that Toškovski was not acting in the best interest of the people but in the best interest of his party, VMRO-DPMNE.

Lawyer and ex-judge Vladimir Tufegdžić criticised the government for an alleged lack of transparency to the public regarding the investigation and said that protests in Kočani may "easily escalate and become out of control". He urged the government to ensure the public understands that it is "unrealistic" for all 68 suspects to be convicted of crimes in a speedy manner, since they have the right to defend themselves in court, and they likely will, with all methods legally permitted to them. He also called upon the government to "mobilise" organisations that support victims of disasters.

Toškovski accused the opposition of trying to shift blame away from themselves and distract from what he said is the real issue, that institutions "remained silent, even though they knew". He said that trust in the police is growing due to his efforts in tackling corruption in government. He denied any failures by the Ministry of Internal Affairs regarding the fire.

== Legal proceedings ==
On 13 June, charges were filed against 34 people and three legal entities, mostly for "grave acts against public security", while one individual was also charged with "soliciting bribery". The legal proceedings began in November. All defendants have denied the charges. In total, there are 58 defendants in four separate legal proceedings. In May 2026, three police officers were given suspended sentences by the Basic Criminal Court of Skopje for abusing their positions. The verdict was criticised by the parents of the victims.

== Vigils and protests ==
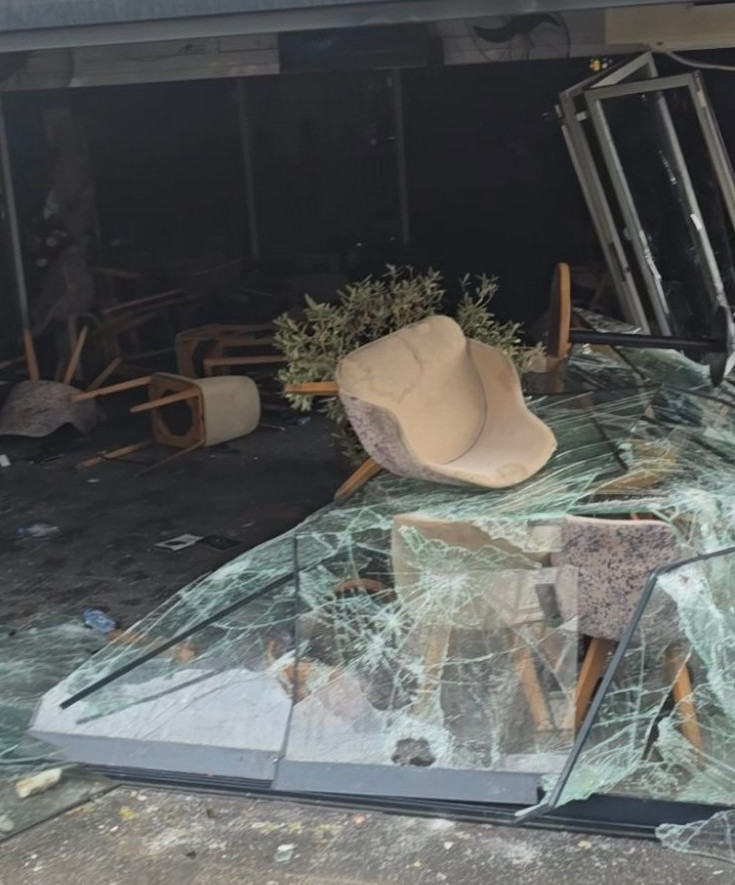
The café "Klasik", owned by Dejan Jovanov, who also owned Pulse, which was demolished as a result of the protests in Kočani.

A candlelight vigil was held in Kočani. KF Shkupi paid tribute to Andrej Lazarov in a club statement. In the wake of the fire, a series of spontaneous protests unfolded across the country. That evening, citizens began gathering in city squares, including in Kočani, Štip, Vinica, Strumica, and Gevgelija, to mourn and seek justice. The following day, 17 March, saw peaceful protests and tributes nationwide. In Kočani, the protest intensified when some citizens, primarily youths, threw eggs, glass bottles, and other objects at the municipal building, damaging the façade and breaking windows. The police blocked them from entering the building. They called for the appearance of Mayor Ljupčo Papazov, who had already resigned.

A group then vandalised the Klasik café bar and a vehicle owned by Dejan Jovanov, who also owned Pulse. Protesters approached the Kočani Macedonian Police station, confronting officers without major incidents. A crowd overturned a car belonging to the owner of the Pulse Nightclub and tried to set his house on fire. Police tried to calm the situation by telling the crowd that there were children inside the building, but the crowd responded that no one prevented the deaths of the child victims of the fire. On 18 March, a crowd approached Papazov's house and attempted to breach the police barrier so they could pelt the house with stones, but a priest pacified them, saying, "Let's save the children first, then we'll burn down the city if you want."

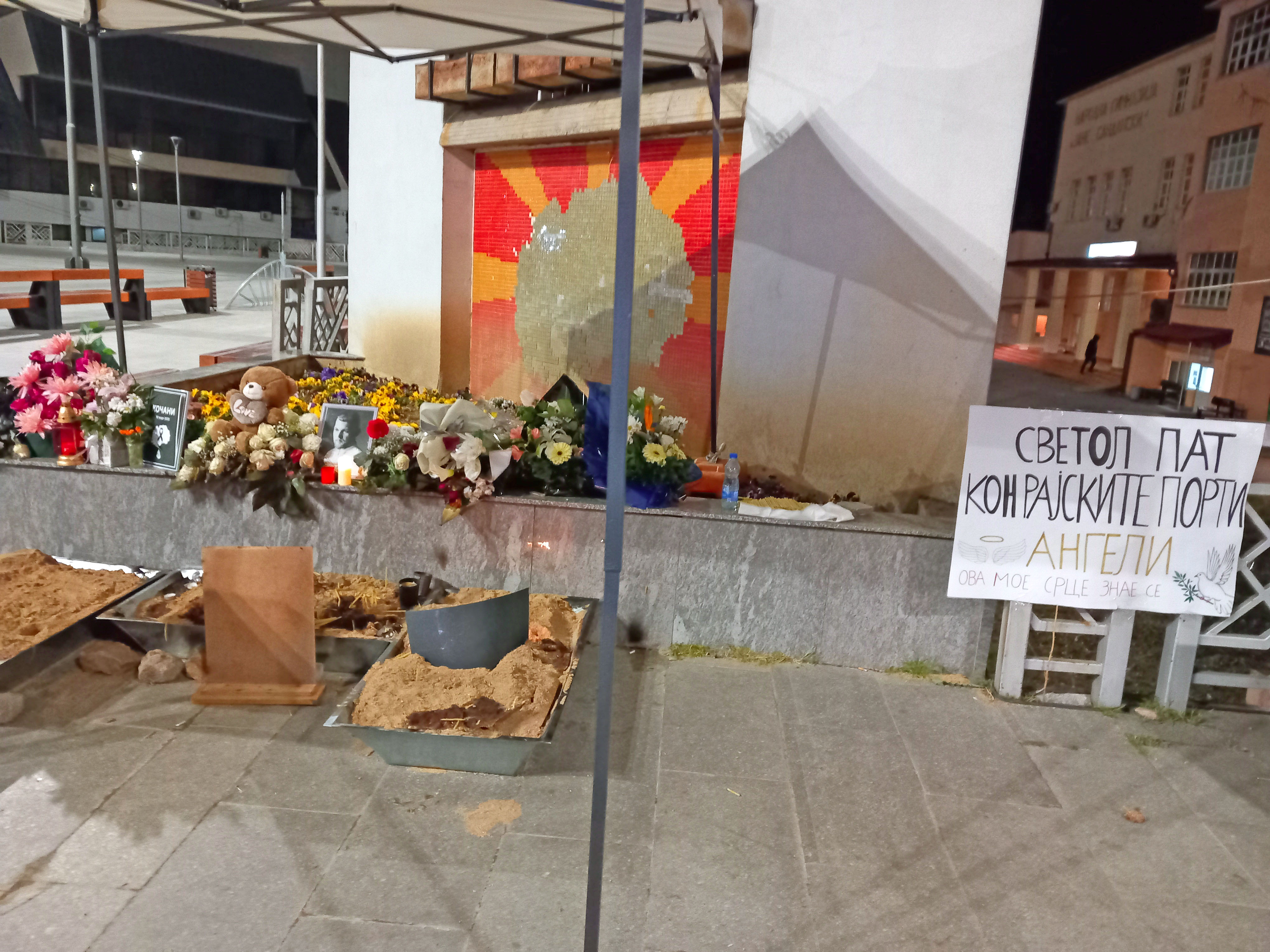
Paying tribute to Gjorgji Gjorgiev and the victims of the Kočani fire in Strumica

In Štip, students rallied, demanding accountability for the disaster that claimed five of their fellow residents. The demonstration began in the city square and moved towards the municipal building. At noon, thousands of students in Skopje observed a seven-minute silence at the Ss. Cyril and Methodius University of Skopje (UKIM) to honour the 59 lives lost. Speeches by Education and Science Minister Vesna Janevska and Rector Biljana Angelova were briefly interrupted when two attendees collapsed, requiring medical attention. Students began to whistle and shout at Janevska, interrupting her speech, and riot police surrounded her.

Strumica also witnessed a peaceful gathering in its city square, with participants demanding justice for the fire victims. Gjorgji Gjorgiev, the drummer of the band DNK, was among the deceased; he hailed from Strumica. Additional peaceful protests occurred in Bitola, Kavadarci, Probištip, Tetovo, Veles, and other cities. The next day, 18 March, a public gathering was scheduled in Ohrid, as well as a student gathering at 18:00 (CET) on Macedonia Square in Skopje. On 18 March, a group of residents in Novi Sad, Serbia, gathered in Freedom Square to light candles in honour of the victims of the fire.

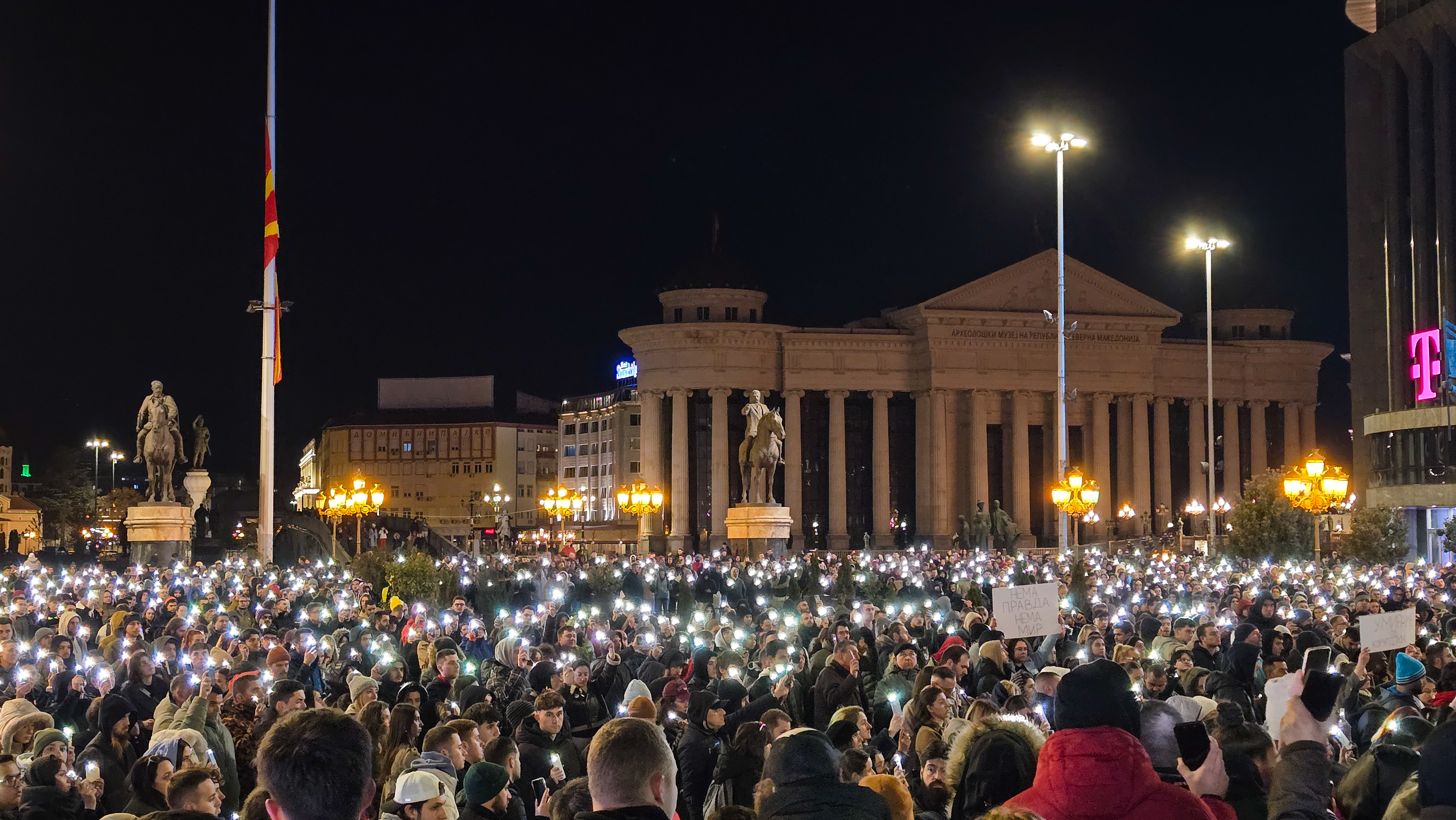
On 18 March 2025, people gathered at Macedonia Square in Skopje to pay tribute to the victims of the Kočani nightclub fire. During a moment of silence, they turned on their phone flashes and pointed them toward the sky as a symbolic gesture of remembrance.

On 18 March, rallies were held in every city across North Macedonia to honour the deceased and demand justice and accountability for the victims of the fire. The demonstrations, primarily organised by university students and high schoolers, drew participants of all ages.

A rally took place at Macedonia Square, gathering several thousand citizens. Following the protest, seven media workers, including journalists from Reuters, were detained at the Centar police station. Authorities justified their detention by claiming they had been broadcasting live drone footage when the usage of drones was banned, although the Ministry of Interior announced the ban during the protest. A similar incident occurred in Kočani, where a crew from the Bulgarian television station BTV was also detained for operating a drone. On 22 March, Macedonians in Thessaloniki gathered in Aristotelous Square to observe 60 minutes of silence for all of the victims and the ambulance driver.

On 24 March, a rally with several thousand attendees was held by the protest movement "Who is Next?", at which activists called for accountability for the fire by the government, as they did not believe that the government would honour their promises and the law. The crowd approached the St. Naum of Ohrid hospital, where they applauded and praised the doctors and nurses, and then went to a government building where they called the government "murderers" and demanded the "entire government['s]" resignation. On 26 March, Projkovska's students (she was a professor at UKIM) released 60 white balloons from the balcony of the UKIM Faculty of Music and held musical performances in her honour. On 29 March, Who is Next? held a protest outside the Sobranie Palace, the seat of the Assembly of North Macedonia.

On 5 April, a protest in Kočani was held under the name of March for the Angels, which involved the families of some of the victims. On 19 April, families of the victims of the fire held a protest rally in Kočani demanding for the investigation and prosecutions to be increased in scope and accelerated. The rally ended in front of the Kočani local prosecutor's office. On 28 June, another March for the Angels was held in Kočani. The twelfth March of the Angels was held in Kočani on 5 July, organised by the association "16 March 2025 – Kočani" (Macedonian: 16 март 2025 – Кочани, romanised: 16 mart 2025 – Kočani).

== Reactions ==
=== Domestic ===
Prime Minister Hristijan Mickoski expressed deep sadness over the nightclub fire, saying the loss of so many young lives was irreparable and that the government was fully mobilised to help determine the cause of the fire. President Gordana Siljanovska-Davkova visited some of the fire victims in hospitals and met with their relatives. She called for punishment for those responsible for the fire and said, "Nothing is worthier than human life, specifically young life." The mayor of Kočani, Ljupčo Papazov, resigned on 17 March. In a social media post announcing his resignation, he called for a thorough investigation into the fire and for national unity amongst Macedonians. On 14 April, Kočani municipal council member Venko Krstevski was appointed as acting mayor of Kočani.

Minister of Health Arben Taravari said that representatives would be appointed to inform parents of the victims transported outside the country of their relatives' condition every four to five hours. Toškovski announced on 20 March that all Macedonian telephone operators had decided to exempt all phone numbers of Macedonians abroad from roaming and internet fees so that they can contact their relatives in North Macedonia and institutions, if necessary.

Seven days of national mourning were declared for the victims. Two 18-year-olds were arrested in Skopje on the night of 19 March for violating the national mourning period after it was determined that they held a birthday celebration at a restaurant in the Skopje City Park and set off fireworks there. The AVMU advised the media to "broadcast/publish content that, in terms of its media function, corresponds to the days of mourning" and stipulated that the broadcast music should be from "musical genres appropriate for days of mourning", all comedic and entertainment shows should be postponed, and advertisements should not be shown during the days of mourning. In this duration, they also temporarily lifted a requirement that broadcasters broadcast a certain percentage of Macedonian music.

Minister of Culture and Tourism Zoran Ljutkov announced the cancellation of all cultural activities conducted by the Ministry of Culture and its national institutions scheduled for the next week. He offered his support to the victims and their relatives and said that all cultural institutions in Skopje will provide support if necessary. The Macedonian National Theater announced the cancellation of all performances scheduled between 17 and 22 March and that relatives of the victims in Skopje visiting their injured relatives in hospital would be provided with accommodation in the theatre's dressing rooms and suites. In Skopje, many hotels and restaurants offered free accommodation and food for the relatives of victims being treated in Skopje. The Macedonian government opened a hotline for psychological support for the victims and their families.

The AVMU announced a 1,500,000 MKD (27447.39 USD) donation to the Macedonian Red Cross's Solidarity Fund to assist the victims of the fire. The UKIM students' union donated the 415,724 MKD (7607.03 USD) that they collected at student gatherings to the fund. As of 20 March 2025, 34,836,205 MKD (637441.99 USD) had been donated to the Solidarity Fund in total. On 30 April, Stopanska Banka announced a 250,000 euro (282167.04 USD) donation to more than 200 families affected by the fire.

The North Macedonia national football team, with permission from UEFA, wore a black and grey kit during their first two 2026 FIFA World Cup qualification matches to honour the victims. During their matches on 22 March against Liechtenstein and on 25 March against Wales, both teams wore black armbands and observed a moment of silence before kick-off. In addition, the Football Federation of North Macedonia donated all proceeds from ticket sales for the match against Wales in Skopje to the victims and their families. On 15 April, a memorial to the victims of the fire was unveiled at the Šutka prison in Skopje. On 29 April, the concertmaster of the London Symphony Orchestra, Roman Simović, performed in a benefit concert with the Fame's Institute Orchestra at the hall of the Macedonian Philharmonic Orchestra, with all proceeds going to the Red Cross fund dedicated to assisting families of victims of the fire.

On 1 April, North Macedonia's parliament approved a ban of the usage on pyrotechnics in enclosed spaces. On 28 April, Kočani's acting mayor, Venko Krstevski, declared that restaurants would have 90 days to bring their sidewalk cafes to regulation, after which violations will lead to forcible demolition. He said that this was meant to assist emergency services' movement and said it was a reaction to the Pulse fire, where crowded roads caused firetrucks difficulty in reaching the burning club.

The municipality of Vinica, Jovan Kostadinov's hometown, announced that it would dedicate a commemorative plaque to him and awarded him a monthly subsidy of 6000 MKD (109.79 USD) for higher education for rescuing 21 people from the club.

In May 2025, photojournalist Slobodan Đurić won first place in a photography competition organised by the Association of Journalists of Macedonia with his photograph Father – Kočani (Macedonian: Татко – Кочани, romanised: Tatko – Kočani), depicting a grieving father holding a photograph of his deceased son, a young victim of the fire.

In July 2025, the Ministry of Health refused to allow journalists access to the Kočani hospital where victims of the fire were being rehabilitated, with the justification of protecting the patients' privacy. According to Sloboden Pečat, the patients had given their permission to being filmed and interviewed.

=== International ===
Politicians from the European Union, Albania, Azerbaijan, Belarus, Bosnia and Herzegovina, Bulgaria, Croatia, the Czech Republic, Georgia, Greece, Ireland, Israel, Italy, Kosovo, Latvia, Lithuania, Moldova, Montenegro, Norway, Poland, Romania, Russia, Serbia, Slovakia, Slovenia, Sweden, Turkey, Ukraine, and the United Arab Emirates expressed their condolences over the loss of life and offered support to the Macedonian authorities.

Pope Francis and Bartholomew I of Constantinople also sent their condolences. Bosnia and Herzegovina, Bulgaria and Serbia declared 18 March a national day of mourning in solidarity with North Macedonia. Montenegro also declared a day of mourning on 17 March. Macedonian Health Minister Arben Taravari acknowledged receiving offers of assistance from neighbouring countries such as Albania, Bulgaria, Greece, and Serbia. Lithuania assisted North Macedonia by treating four injured people in Vilnius.

== See also ==
- List of nightclub fires
- List of fireworks accidents and incidents
- The Station nightclub fire, 2003 nightclub fire caused by on-stage pyrotechnics and flammable acoustic foam sheets
- Lame Horse fire, 2009 nightclub fire caused by pyrotechnics, flammable decorative twigs and polymers
- Kiss nightclub fire, 2013 nightclub fire caused by on-stage pyrotechnics and flammable acoustic foam sheets
- Good People, documentary on Kočani night club fire
