= Ana Lasić =

Slovenian screenwriter and playwright of Serbian descent

Ana Lasić (1972) is a Serbian-Slovenian screenwriter, playwright, and author of the Intuitive Screenwriting system — an archetypal approach to story structure that uncovers the hidden matrix behind the Hero’s Journey by tracing the inner transformations of the human psyche. Her book Intuitivna scenaristika was published in Slovenia in 2023.

== Biography ==
She was born in Belgrade, Yugoslavia. Lasić studied at the Faculty of Dramatic Arts of Belgrade's University of Arts and completed Magistra of Arts Thesis in form of the play Gde ti živiš? and received unanimously the Slobodan-Selenić-Award for Best Graduation Work at FDU (Nagrada „Selenić“ za najbolju diplomsku dramu na FDU).

Professres Lasić is thaughting screenwriting at the State Academy for Theater, Film and TV (AGRFT) in Ljubljana. She has been living in Slovenia since 2000.

Some citations by Lasić from Serbian (Večernje novosti) and Slovenian (RTV) interviews of the years 2006 and 2016, summarized as follows:

I think migration is a state of mind that is inherent in human being, it has something healthy, offers a more realistic view of the world. I have never considered myself as Serbian artist, question remains whether I will ever feel like a Slovene or any other. I think that people who give themselves to the world, do not think about who they belong to.

== Work ==
Theatre

- Ulični psi (co-author Đorđe Milosavljević), based on Reservoir Dogs, Premiere at BITEF 1997.
- Gde ti živiš? (Where Do You Live?), theatre magazine Scena, 2000.

The play was awarded third place in the second Viennese drama competition for authors from former Yugoslavia in 2000, translated into German and published in a two-volume book edition including all original versions; organizers were the staff of freelance group Theater m.b.H which is no more existing for a couple of years. German translation has been introduced as stage reading at Stückemarkt of Berliner Theatertreffen 2003. German premiere at Theaterforum Kreuzberg in 2008.

It is about a group of young people who try to fill their lives with meaning and love in the political state of emergency in Belgrade, but drug excesses, promiscuity, violence and the absence of existential sense are the result. Their hopeless attempts to overcome drug addiction, their flight from reality and the longing to start again in another country convey the image of a lost generation in destroyed society. The Time of the plot is December 1998, after previous Serbian protests and the imminent Kosovo war.

- Za sada nigde (For Now Nowhere), Premiere at SNG Drama, Ljubljana 2005.

The play received the Dominik Smole Award for best play at Borštnikovo srečanje 2006 in Maribor. Serbian premiere at Yugoslav Drama Theatre in 2009.

- Fužinski bluz, based on the novel by Andrej E. Skubic, premiere at SNG Drama, Ljubljana 2005.

Guest performance at theatre biennale 2006 of Hessisches Staatstheater Wiesbaden.

- Romanovela – Love in Translation, 2005.

The play is dealing with cultural and ethnic prejudices between Romani and Gadje. It has been shown in Austria (Volkshaus Graz, first premiere), Slovakia (Dom kultúry Zrkadlový háj, second premiere), Hungary (Tűzraktér Budapest), Italy (Teatro di San Faustino Sarezzo), Romania (Bulandra Theatre), and Slovenia (Gledališče Koper), supported by EU Culture 2000 program, and including creative participation of Romathan Theatre Košice (Divadlo Romathan).

- One Hundred Years of Solitude, drama adaptation of the same named novel by Gabriel García Márquez, 2016.

The play (co-author Ivo Svetina) should be premiered in collaboration with UDG Culture Guadalajara in December 2016, but was not realized because of the sudden and unexpected death of director Tomaž Pandur.

Film

- Ruševine (Ruins), feature film 2004 (co-author Janez Burger).

Award for Best Film at the 7th Slovenian Film Festival, and shown at festivals in Europe and the United States, including the Rotterdam Film Festival, Karlovy Vary, Minneapolis, Motovun, and Palm Springs.

- Angela Vode, skriti spomin (Angela Vode, Hidden Memories), television film 2009, co-screenwriter.
- Na terapiji, screenwriter, Slovenian adaptation of TV film series BeTipul, Pop TV 2011.
- Balkan Is Not Dead, feature film 2012, co-screenwriter.
- Avtošola (Driving School), television film 2014, co-screenwriter.
