= Fužinski bluz =

2001 novel by Andrej E. Skubic

- Author: Andrej E. Skubic
- Language: Slovenian
- Publication date: 2001
- Publication place: Slovenia

Fužinski bluz is a novel by Slovenian author Andrej E. Skubic. It was first published in 2001.

== Plot ==
The story of Fužine Blues takes place on June 13, 2000. This day is not any day, but the day of the football match between Slovenia and Yugoslavia in the European Championship qualifiers, which ends in a draw 3: 3, or as one of the storytellers Janina says, 6: 0 for Yugoslavia or 6: 0 for themselves. The spatial framework has been carefully chosen, as Skubic lived in Fužine for some time. Fužine is a block of flats in Ljubljana, famous for its great national diversity. These are parallel stories of four protagonists, who are first spatially connected, as they all live on the tenth floor of the same ironworks. Each of them tells their own story in their own "dialect". They tell about their work, friends, environment, love, random acquaintances and co-workers. On this day, which is even more important for each individual, each of them strives to do something different that would change his situation.

Peter Sokič – Pero, a former heavy metal player in his early thirties, is trying to bring together his former klapa from fifteen years ago, but he is not particularly successful. He finally says goodbye to his youthful society, which has partly died or lost its compass, given in to addiction, and partly renounced its youthful values and settled down, settled down. The memory of the infamous fights and lewd "drunks" shows the personal distress of an abandoned, lonely advertiser who can't get over his unrequited love for Irena, which pushes him to the brink of madness in drunken hallucinations full of violence.

Igor Ščinkavec, a real estate agent in his mid-forties, is inflatingly talking about concluding contracts with his clients. Together with his southern assistant Zoki, he tries to become an apartment seller overnight as a bus driver, gets involved in an absurd dispute with the Montenegrin mobster, Janina's uncle Mladen Mirković, and gives the impression of an invulnerable, tough and uncompromising businessman.

Sixteen-year-old Janina Pašković, a Montenegrin father after her father, is a typical high school student, spends her days in bars, avoids school obligations with friends and strives to become as popular and accepted as possible among her peers. While searching for his own identity, he unexpectedly discovers tenderness and sexuality in the embrace of his best friend Daša.

Vera Erjavec is a retired professor of Slovene who is interested in graffiti on the walls of Ljubljana and therefore passionately describes them and finds out their meaning. He is constantly thinking about the language and its grammar, about the correctness of the language and about the young people who use that language, about his failed marriage and about his former neighbor Adam Zaman, to whom he cultivates unrecognized feelings. Under the pretext of the spatial problems of the faculty department, she visits him on this day after many years, but she returns home without any success and, even more confused than before, fails to recognize her repressed eroticism. All four heroes seek their place in the community, trying to find meaning in their miserable lives, but each of them is too weak in himself to guide and tame his destiny, as they cling too much to the past and fail to face the present.

== See also ==
- List of Slovenian novels
