= Popkorn (novel) =

Novel

- Author: Andrej E. Skubic
- Language: Slovenian
- Publication date: 2006
- Publication place: Slovenia

Popkorn is a novel by Slovenian author Andrej E. Skubic. It was first published in 2006.

== See also ==
- List of Slovenian novels
