= Grenki med =

1999 novel by Andrej E. Skubic

- Author: Andrej E. Skubic
- Language: Slovenian
- Publication date: 1999
- Publication place: Slovenia
- ISBN: 86-341-2349-9

Grenki med (Bitter Honey) is a novel by Slovenian author Andrej E. Skubic. It was first published in 1999.

The novel received the 2000 Kresnik Award for the best novel in Slovene.

== See also ==
- List of Slovenian novels
