= Kiril Džajkovski =

Macedonian musician

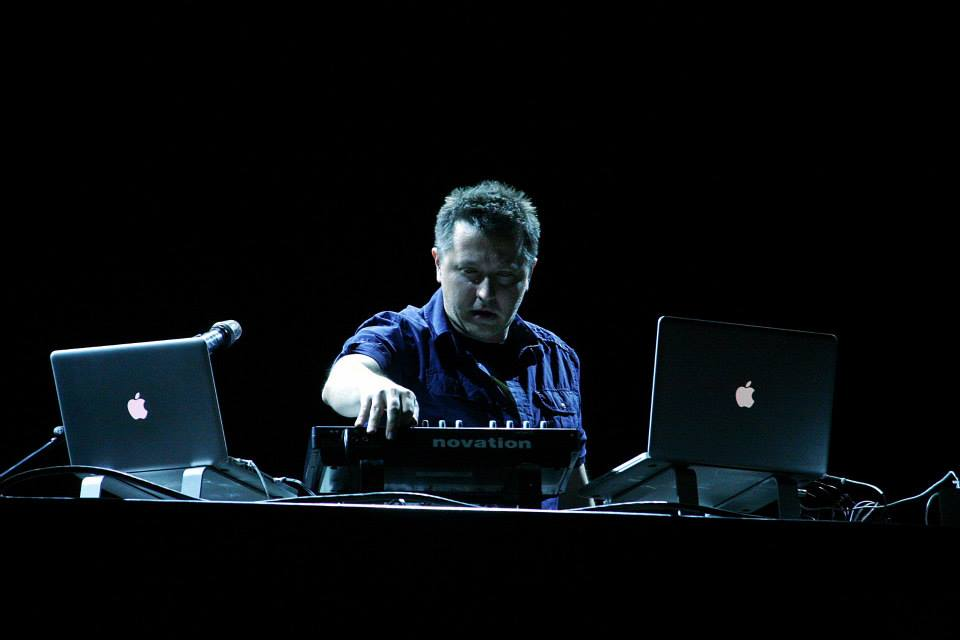
Kiril Džajkovski – Macedonian musician and composer

Kiril Džajkovski (Djaikovski), (Macedonian: Кирил Џајковски [ˈkiril ˈdʒajkɔfski] (listen)) – often credited as simply Kiril – is a Macedonian electronic musician and music composer. He is one of the pioneer producers to introduce Balkan ethnic sounds to the modern electronic music production. Kiril is also an accomplished composer of film and theatre music.

== Biography ==
He started his music career by forming Bastion, one of the first electronic bands in the Balkans. Subsequently, he went on to play with one of the most famous Macedonian bands Leb i sol, recording two albums and touring extensively around the Balkans and Europe.

While living in Australia he continued his music experiments by combining ethnic Macedonian music and electronica which led to his first solo release, Synthetic Theatre, an EP received extremely well by Australian independent radio stations.

Following was his first solo album ‘Homebound’ released by American label Tone Casualties, which continued the concept of blending Macedonian ethnic instrumentation and electronica. It received excellent reviews from critics around the world, including the United States, Canada, UK, Spain and Japan.

This was followed by a series of Singles and EPs released on Filter Label like: Jungle Shadow, Lion's Den, Reminder, Music Man, Red Safari, Spin Off and Hell of a Road.

Kiril's electronic music was introduced live at some of the biggest music festivals in Europe like Pohoda, Cruilla, Pol'and'Rock Festival, Exit Festival, Alrumbo, Fusion Festival, Rock for People, Sziget, Rototom Sunsplash, Les Vieilles Charrues, Au Foin De La Rue, Les Z'éclectiques, and many others. In his live performances he incorporates live instruments and various guest vocalists and collaborators, including: TK Wonder, MC Wasp, Ghetto Priest, Lion D, Rootsman I.

== Film and theatre music ==
Kiril is one of the most acclaimed composers of film and theatre music in the region. He worked with Oscar nominated director Milčo Mančevski and composed the music score for his films: ‘Dust’ and ‘Willow’ as well as additional music for his movie ‘Shadows’. He also composed the music for Darko Mitrevski ‘Bal-can-can’ movie, the highest-grossing Macedonian film to date. Mitrevski and Džajkovski have also collaborated on the movie ‘The Third Half’.

Several of Džajkovski's compositions were featured on the critically acclaimed Australian miniseries, Underbelly.

Kiril Džajkovski has composed the music for Ivo Trajkov's movie ‘The Great Water’ (Best Music Award- Valencia Film Festival, Spain) and for their latest collaboration on the Slovak movie ‘Piargy’.

Additionally, he has a successful career as a composer of theatre music working mostly with acclaimed theatre and film director Aleksandar Popovski on over 20 theatre projects premiered at various prestigious theatre houses in the Balkans and Europe, as well as composing the soundtrack for his film ‘Balkan Is Not Dead’.

His work as a composer was featured in various modern ballet productions, including: ‘La Capinera’ (Special Music Award Purgatorije Mediterranean Festival, Montenegro) in Belgrade, ‘14 hours’ in Skopje,’5 to 12’ in Split, ‘Het Barre Land’ in Amsterdam.

== Discography ==
=== Discography ===
- Piargy - OST - Filter Label
- Balkan Is Not Dead - OST - Filter Label
- The Great Water - OST - Filter Label
- Dust - OST - Filter Label
- Homebound - Djaikovski - Filter Label
- Remixed - Djaikovski - Filter Label
- Djaikovski EP - KDZ Music
- Recorded Supplement -Aparatchicks - AG RECORDS
- Bal-Can-Can - OST- AG Records
- Works & Re-works-Bastion- AG Records/
- La Capinera-OST- AG Records
- Synthetic Theatre - Kiril - AG RECORDS
- Razorbrain - Razorbrain - EMI AUSTRALIA
- Bastion - Bastion - PGP RTB

=== Music for films ===
- Piargy- dir. Ivo Trajkov
- Willow- dir. Milcho Manchevski
- Balkan Is Not Dead - dir. Aleksandar Popovski
- The Third Half - dir. Darko Mitrevski
- As If I Am Not There- dir. Juanita Wilson
- Shadows- dir. Milcho Manchevski
- Bal-Can-Can- dir. Darko Mitrevski
- The Great Water- dir. Ivo Trajkov
- Dust- dir. Milcho Manchevski
- Absence (short feature)- dir. Vanja Dimitrova
- The Contract (short feature)- dir. Anna Zaytseva
- Leonardo (animated series)- dir. Boro Pejcinov
- Northern Mistake- dir. Boris Damovski
- Marika on an Airplane- dir. Boris Damovski
- Tough Granny (short feature)- dir. Milcho Manchevski

=== Music for theatre ===
- Heroines- MGL, Slovenia
- 5 to 12- HNK, Croatia
- Hamlet- JDP, Serbia
- Dangerous Liaisons- Harbiye Muhsin Ertuğrul Sahnesi Theatre, Turkiye
- 14 Hours- NOB, Macedonia
- Candide or Optimism- JDP, Serbia
- A Midsummer Night's Dream- Gavella, Croatia
- La Capinera- Terazije Theater, Serbia
- Incident in the Town of Goga- SLG Celje, Slovenia
- New Friends- NTNG, Greece
- For Now, Nowhere- SNG Ljubljana, Slovenia
- Alisa- Atelje 212, Serbia
- Tempest- Turkish Drama, Macedonia
- Three Sisters- NTB, Macedonia
- Cherry Orchard- SNP, Serbia
- Danton's Death- CSS Teatro Stabile, Italy
- Dracula- SNG Maribor, Slovenia
- Balkan Is Not Dead- MNT, Macedonia
- Proud Flesh- Dramski Teatar, Macedonia
- Roberto Zucco- Atelje 212, Serbia
- Powder Keg- Kerempuh, Croatia

=== Singles ===
- Red Safari - ft. Lion D
- Music Man - ft. Lion D
- Reminder - ft. Lion D
- Spin Off - ft. MC Wasp
- Hell Of A Road - ft. TK Wonder
- Lion's Den - ft. MC Wasp and Ghetto Priest
- Raise Up Your Hand - ft. Ras Tweed and Esma
- Jungle Shadow – ft. MC Wasp
- Baba Zumbula - ft. Vlada Divljan
- Primitive Science

=== Compilations ===
- Balkan Beats 3- Eastblok, Berlin
- Balkan Beats 2- Eastblok, Berlin
- Melbourne Yard- PBS FM, Melbourne
- Ali B Presents Y4K- Distinctive Records, London
- Musique & Cinema du Monde- Nada/ MK2 Music, Paris
- Euro Lounge- Putumayo, New York
- Together- Barramundi 4- Pschent Music, Paris
- Taking Care of Business- 10 Kilo, London
- Ritmistika- Third Ear Music, Skopje
- High On House - New York to Melbourne- Odessa Mama Records, Melbourne
- Dynamik- Vital Song, Paris
- Pathaans Small World- Stoned Asia, London
- Max Trax 2002- Tone Casualties, Los Angeles
- mACIDonia 2000- PMG Recordings, Skopje
- Fathom -Antipodian Beats- Angel's Trumpet, Melbourne

=== Music for documentaries ===
- In the Line of Fire - dir. Marion Crooke
- Koorie Culture/Koori Control - dir. Russel Porter
- The Gulf Between - dir. Monique Schwartz
- Guns and Roses - dir. Carole Sklan (Australian Film Institute Award for Best Documentary)

== See also ==
- Bastion
- Music of Republic of Macedonia
