= Shadows (2007 film) =

- Directed by: Milcho Manchevski
- Written by: Milcho Manchevski
- Produced by: Milcho Manchevski; Amedeo Pagani; Corinna Mehner; Nermin Gladers; Martin Hussman; Dimitar Gočev; Gerrardo Herrero; Mariela Besuievsky
- Cinematography: Fabio Cianchetti
- Edited by: David Ray; Martin Levenstein
- Music by: Ryan Shore (additional music by Kiril Džajkovski)
- Distributed by: Bavaria Film International
- Release date: September 9, 2007
- Running time: 120 minutes
- Country: Macedonia
- Language: Macedonian

Shadows (Macedonian: Сенки, Transliteration: Senki) is a 2007 Macedonian horror-drama film by the Academy-award nominated director Milcho Manchevski. It was filmed on location in Skopje, Ohrid and several other locations in the Republic of Macedonia.

== Plot ==
Lazar "Lucky" Perkov begins meeting increasingly strange people after he miraculously survives a disastrous car crash. Each of these people pass on the same enigmatic message: "Return what's not yours. Have Respect."

The movie follows Lucky's attempts to unravel the meaning of this ominous message, and to grow into the man he knows he could be.

== Cast ==
Actor	Role
Borče Nacev	Dr. Lazar Perkov
Salaetin Bilal	Gerasim
Vesna Stanojevska	Menka
Sabina Ajrula	Dr. Vera Perkova
Ratka Radmanovic	Kalina
Vladimir Jacev	Dr. Shishkin
Filareta Zdravkovic	Gordana
Dime Iliev	Ignjat Perkov
Petar Mircevski	Blagojce
Goce Vlahov	prof. Kokale
Ana Kostovska	Radmila
Zaklina Stefkovska	Peca
Ilko Stefanovski	
Izabela Novotni	Izabela
Marina Pop Pankova	Elena
Joana Popovska	Slavka
Kire Gorevski	Miki
Jordan Simonov	Pance
Branko Beninov	Paramedic
Boris Corevski	Stamat
Laze Manaskovski	Taxi Driver
Dimitar Gjorgjevski	Cabrel
Nino Levi	Miho
Nesrin Tair	Donka
Ljupco Bresliski	Eftim
Tamer Ibrahim	
Zora Georgieva	Aunt Jerusalimka
Vasil Šiškov	Priest
Nadzi Šaban	Merodi
Abdurahman Rahman	Ljuzlim
Zoran Ljutkov	Slavko
Vlado Dojcinovski	Borce
Mustafa Jasar	Trajče
Petar Dimoski	Tase
Erdoan Maksut	Balkanski
Antonio Dimitrievski	Waiter
Trajče Gjorgiev	Jonanson
Blagoj Veselinov	Pepi

== Production ==
The film was written and directed by Milcho Manchevski, and produced by Mariela Besuievsky, Nermin Gladers, Dimitar Gochev, Gerardo Herrero, and Martin Husmann, Milcho Manchevski, Robert Jazadziski, Corinna Meaner, Elena Melamed, Amedeo Pagani, and Thomas Woodrow. Fabio Cianchetti was the director of photography, David Munns was the production designer, Marty Levenstein and David Ray edited the film, and the music was composed by Ryan Shore and Kiril Džajkovski. Principal photography took place in Ohrid, Saramzalino and Skopje, Macedonia.

== Awards ==
- Macedonian Academy Award Submission, 2008: Best Foreign-Language Film
- Golden Ladybug, 2008: Best Actress (Vesna Stanojevska in Shadows)
- Golden Ladybug, 2008: Best Music Video (Jungle Shadow in Shadows)
- Park City Film Music Festival, 2008: Gold Medal for Outstanding Achievement, Ryan Shore, composer
- Syracuse Film Festival, 2008: Best Actress, Vesna Stanojevska in Shadows

== Soundtrack ==
The music was composed by Ryan Shore.

== Critical reception ==
The film has premiered at several international film festivals, the first being the Toronto International Film Festival. The film was well received with one of the festival's film critics calling it "Manchevski’s most ambitious film to date". Other critics, such as Patrick McGavin of Screen Daily, called it “ambitious and capably mounted […] (Manchevski) retains a very fine eye for composition, aided by the sensuous, beautiful work of Italian cinematographer Fabio Cianchetti. The movie's standout quality is the sexy, revealing work of the vibrant, highly alluring young actress Vesna Stanojevska, a professional musician making her film debut. She injects the film with an erotic intensity”.

Rotten Tomatoes gave Shadows an average score of 60%, and an audience review of 58%. It had mixed reviews as a "respectable enough ghost story.." although, it was "bogged down with cliches".

IMDb audience gave shadows a 6.8 star rating, while critics gave it a score of 49 from metacritic.com

Stephen Holden from The New York Times, who gave it a score of 60 stated, "As Shadows vacillates between the historical and the occult, you may snicker at the way hackneyed horror movie conventions are redeployed for more serious ends. But you won't be bored. The movie is well acted (especially by Ms. Stanojevska) and very sexy."

The A.V. Club talks about, "It's a very sensual film, revelling in the pleasures of voyeurism.." The A.V. Club had mixed reviews, saying it was well-crafted, although one of his slight.

== Release history ==
Country	Date
Canada	September 9, 2007
Macedonia	November 2, 2007
Taiwan	November 24, 2007
