= Novogradska =

Macedonian film composer and songwriter

Igor Vasilev Игор Василев
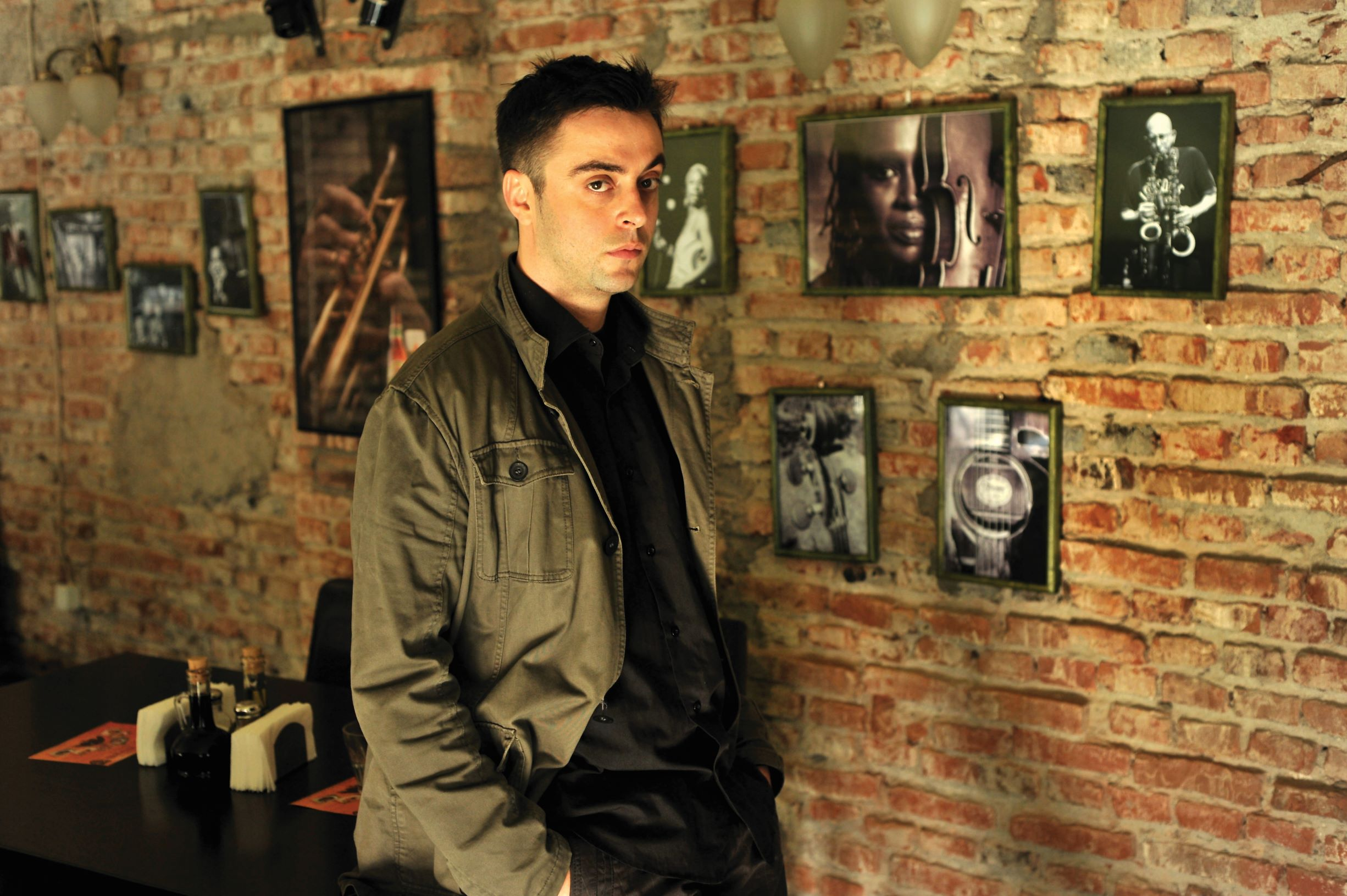

Background information
- Also known as: Novogradska
- Born: June 22, 1978 (age 48); Skopje, SR Macedonia, SFRY (present-day North Macedonia)
- Genres: Film music, Theatre music, Classical, Electronica
- Occupation: Composer
- Years active: 1994–present

Igor Vasilev, credited as Novogradska (Macedonian Cyrillic: Игор Василев; born June 22, 1978, in Skopje, SR Macedonia, SFRY) is a Macedonian composer/musician. He is most famous for his work with Milčo Mančevski on the soundtracks to the films Mothers and Bikini Moon. He collaborated with Macedonian singer Karolina Gočeva on the hit song Ajde da letame, which topped the national charts in 2000 and 2001. He also did music for the two commercials under the title "Macedonia Timeless," which were aired on CNN and many other television stations worldwide promoting Macedonian tourism.

== Filmography ==
=== Feature and documentary films ===
Year	Title	Director
2026	Good People	Documentary, Milcho Manchevski
2026	Sister Brother Manhole Cover	Milcho Manchevski
2026	The Boy with the Light-Blue Eyes	Thanasis Neofotistos
2026	You Won't Believe What Happened Before	Srdzan Janicievich
2025	Better Call Redjo	Ibër Deari
2024	Youth in Trouble	Dimitar Orovcanec
2024	Where Have You Been	Mirko Pincelli
2023	Against the Tide	Sarvnik Kaur
2023	Housekeeping for Beginners	Goran Stolevski
2023	Kaymak	Milcho Manchevski
2021	Sisterhood	Dina Duma
2019	Willow	Milcho Manchevski
2018	The Witness	Mitko Panov
2017	Slovenia, Australia and Tomorrow the World	Marko Nabersnik
2017	Bikini Moon	Milcho Manchevski
2012	Skopje Remix/ Pogan Pagan	Srdzan Janicievich
2010	Mothers	Milcho Manchevski

=== Short films ===
Year	Title	Role	Director
2026	Harmony in movement	Composer	Antonio Veljanovski
2026	The Way Of Chipan	Composer	Antonio Veljanovski
2024	Model Rocketry	Composer	Zlatko Kalenikov
2023	Tak Tak	Composer	Jane Altiparmakov
2019	Snake	Composer	Andrej Volkasin
2018	Mi(s)sing Dog	Composer	Antonio Veljanovski
2017	Kolivo	Composer	Andrej Volkasin
2016	The End of Time	Composer	Milcho Manchevski
2013	Thursday	Composer	Milcho Manchevski

=== Television ===
Year	Title	Role	Director				
2020	Zoki Poki	Title music	Marija Apcevska	2020	Bistra Voda	Title music	Jani Bojadzi

== See also ==
- Music of the Republic of Macedonia
