= Kreshnik Bekteshi =

Macedonian politician (born 1985)

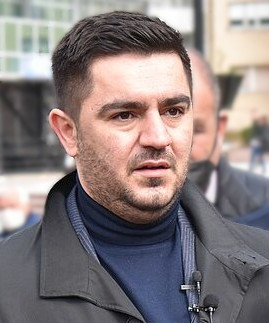

Minister of Economy and Labor of Macedonia
- In office 1 June 2017 – 24 June 2024
- Prime Minister: Zoran Zaev
- Preceded by: Driton Kuçi

Personal details
- Born: 26 September 1985 (age 40) Kërçovë,SFR Yugoslavia
- Party: Democratic Union for Integration
- Profession: politician

Kreshnik Bekteshi ( Macedonian: Кресникбектеши ; born 26 September 1985) is a North Macedonian politician of Albanian descent. He was the Minister of Economy of North Macedonia from 1 June 2017 until 24 June 2024.

== Career ==
In 2008, Bekteshi obtained a Bachelor of Science degree from the Rochester Institute of Technology, then completed a Master's degree at the University of Sheffield. For several years he worked as an economic promoter in Belgium and Switzerland. On 1 July 2017 he took up the position of Minister of Economy , a position he held until 24 June 2024. On 17 March 2025, he was arrested, questioned at a Skopje police station,and brought to testify before a pre-trial judge after the Kočani nightclub fire. The charges stem from licensing and oversight operations conducted by the Economy Ministry during his tenure. Bekteshi was released later.

== Personal life ==
Bekteshi speaks Albanian, English , Macedonian and Turkish.
