= Sister Brother Manhole Cover =

2026 Macedonian comedy drama film

- Promotional poster
- Macedonian: Сестра, брат и шахта
- Directed by: Milcho Manchevski
- Written by: Milcho Manchevski
- Produced by: Jane Kortoshev
- Starring: Sara Klimoska; Filip Trajković; Sonja Mihajlova
- Cinematography: Stefano Falivene
- Edited by: Blagoja Nedelkovski
- Music by: Igor Vasilev Novogradska
- Production companies: Banana Film; Gala Film; SENSE Production; Tirana Film Institute; Coast to Coast; Berkeley Media Group
- Release date: October 30, 2026 (TIFF)
- Running time: 116 minute
- Countries: North Macedonia; Bulgaria; Serbia; Albania; Italy; United Kingdom
- Language: Macedonian

Sister Brother Manhole Cover (Macedonian: Сестра, брат и шахта) is a 2026 comedy-drama film directed and written by Milcho Manchevski. The film is a satire of Macedonian society, depicting a brother and sister who make a living by selling manhole covers to a scrap dealer.

The film had its world premiere in International competition at the 39th Tokyo International Film Festival on 30 October 2026.

== Synopsis ==
Malina and Viktor, a brother and sister, live on the outskirts of post-Communist Macedonia and make a living by stealing bronze busts of national heroes and selling them as scrap. Malina is practical and resourceful but has a bad heart, while Viktor is strong, simple-minded, and devoted to his sister. Their lives change when a stolen bronze bust slips from Viktor's hands and seriously injures his foot. A doctor is called to treat him, but he demands sexual favors from Malina as payment. Faced with his corruption and abuse, Malina takes desperate action, forcing the siblings to flee. Their escape takes them through scrapyards, mountain roads, and abandoned industrial areas. Along the way, they encounter a harsh world shaped by poverty, neglect, and broken social values. Eventually, they find unexpected shelter in the luxurious home of the doctor's blind mother, where their difficult journey takes an unexpected turn.

== Cast ==
Sara Klimoska protagonist of the film

- Sara Klimoska as Malina
- Filip Trajković as Viktor
- Sonja Mihajlova
- Petar Mirčevski
- Jordan Simonov
- Dejan Lilić
- Jasmina Vasileva
- Stefan Nikolovski
- Kalina Naumovska
- Ana Kostovska
- Ivan Gjoševski
- Viktor Arsov
- Marina Pop Pankova

== Release ==
Sister Brother Manhole Cover will be screened for the World Premiere on 30 October 2026, in the Competition section of the 39th Tokyo International Film Festival, where it won Tokyo Grand Prix.. Following its world premiere at the 39th Tokyo International Film Festival, where it won the Tokyo Grand Prix, Sister Brother Manhole Cover continued its international festival run with selections at several international film festivals. The film was presented in the Official Selection – Out of Competition of the 47th Cairo International Film Festival, where it had its Middle East and North Africa premiere, with screenings on 15 and 16 November 2026. It was also selected for the 32nd Auteur Film Festival in Belgrade, Serbia, where it was scheduled to screen on 22 November 2026, followed by a Q&A with the director. A gala premiere in Skopje, North Macedonia, was announced for 29 November 2026.

Rome-based Coccinelle Film Sales acquired the International sales rights of the film in May 2026.

International critics have particularly praised the themes explored by the screenplay, Manchevski’s genre-spanning direction, the performances of the two leads and the cinematography by Italian cinematographer Stefano Falivene. Reporting on the film’s victory at the Tokyo International Film Festival, Variety described it as "a comic allegory". Susanne Gottlieb, writing for Cineuropa, noted how "while most road movies end with the protagonist’s arrival at their final destination, Manchevski flips the script and reveals the plot to be a two-act story, with the second part transforming into a chamber drama". Despite the dramatic themes addressed, Gottlieb observed that "Manchevski never tries to present a murky soup of sorrow. The film’s visual style, vividly captured by DoP Stefano Falivene, is characterised by bright colours, warm lighting and, in Viktor’s childlike mind, happy dreams. Whenever he naps, his mind wanders to fantasies of becoming a famous footballer. When he wakes up, another catastrophe is just around the corner". Elizabeth Kerr, in her review for Screen Daily, described the film as "essentially told in three parts – the first a crime thriller, the second a road trip comedy and the third a neo-Hansel and Gretel family drama", praising that "Manchevski steps back from his usual weighty straight-ahead drama to dabble in more overt dark humour, while still finding a way to comment on contemporary Macedonian society and its most pressing challenges. Evocatively photographed by Stefano Falivene (Abel Ferrara’s Siberia) and with outstanding performances that makes the sillier parts feel real, Sister Brother… bears many of the Manchevski’s formal hallmarks as well as his usual humanism".. Writing for the Italian magazine Sala Grande, Emanuele Bucci particularly praised the two lead characters, Malina and Viktor, comparing them to "Hansel and Gretel in a Macedonia of paradoxes and stifling inequalities, where those in power celebrate an entirely rhetorical past and present, while the less affluent are denied even emergency outpatient treatment if their health insurance is not up to date. Ultimately, what matters is not so much whether the two protagonists will manage to emerge unscathed from their troubles, but rather the strength of their bond in a context of widespread alienation, experienced differently at every level of the class pyramid. What matters is the lightness they nevertheless manage to claim for themselves and convey to us in a society that weighs on one's chest like a manhole cover".

== Accolades ==
Award	Date of ceremony	Category	Recipient	Result	Ref.
Tokyo International Film Festival	4 November 2026	Tokyo Grand Prix	Sister Brother Manhole Cover	Won	
