= Good People (2026 film) =

2026 Macedonian documentary film

- Promotional poster
- Macedonian: Добри луѓе
- Directed by: Milcho Manchevski
- Written by: Milcho Manchevski
- Produced by: Milcho Manchevski
- Cinematography: Ivan Ivanovski
- Edited by: Mishko Chunikhin
- Music by: Igor Vasilev Novogradska
- Production company: Banana film
- Release date: 16 August 2026 (Sarajevo)
- Running time: 86 minute
- Country: North Macedonia
- Language: Macedonian

Good People (Macedonian: Добри луѓе) is a 2026 Macedonian documentary film directed and written by Milcho Manchevski. The film tells the story of the Kočani nightclub fire at the Pulse nightclub in Kocani on 16 March 2025, when 63 young people died. The tagline of the film is "When good people burn in hell".

It held its world premiere at the 32nd Sarajevo Film Festival on 16 August 2026, screening in the Competition Programme – Documentary Film 2026, and competed for the Heart of Sarajevo award.

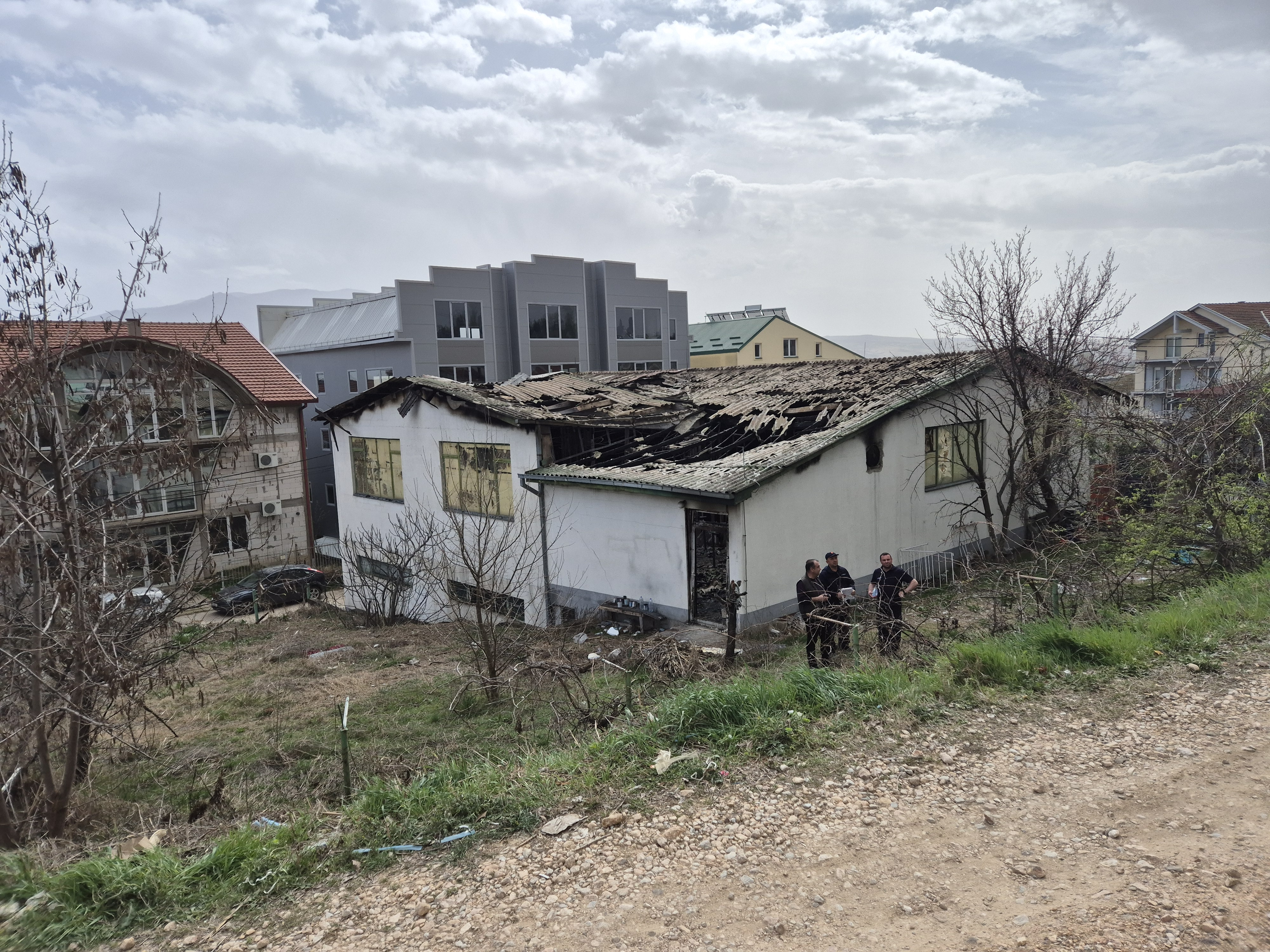
Remains of night club in Kochani after the fire

== Background ==
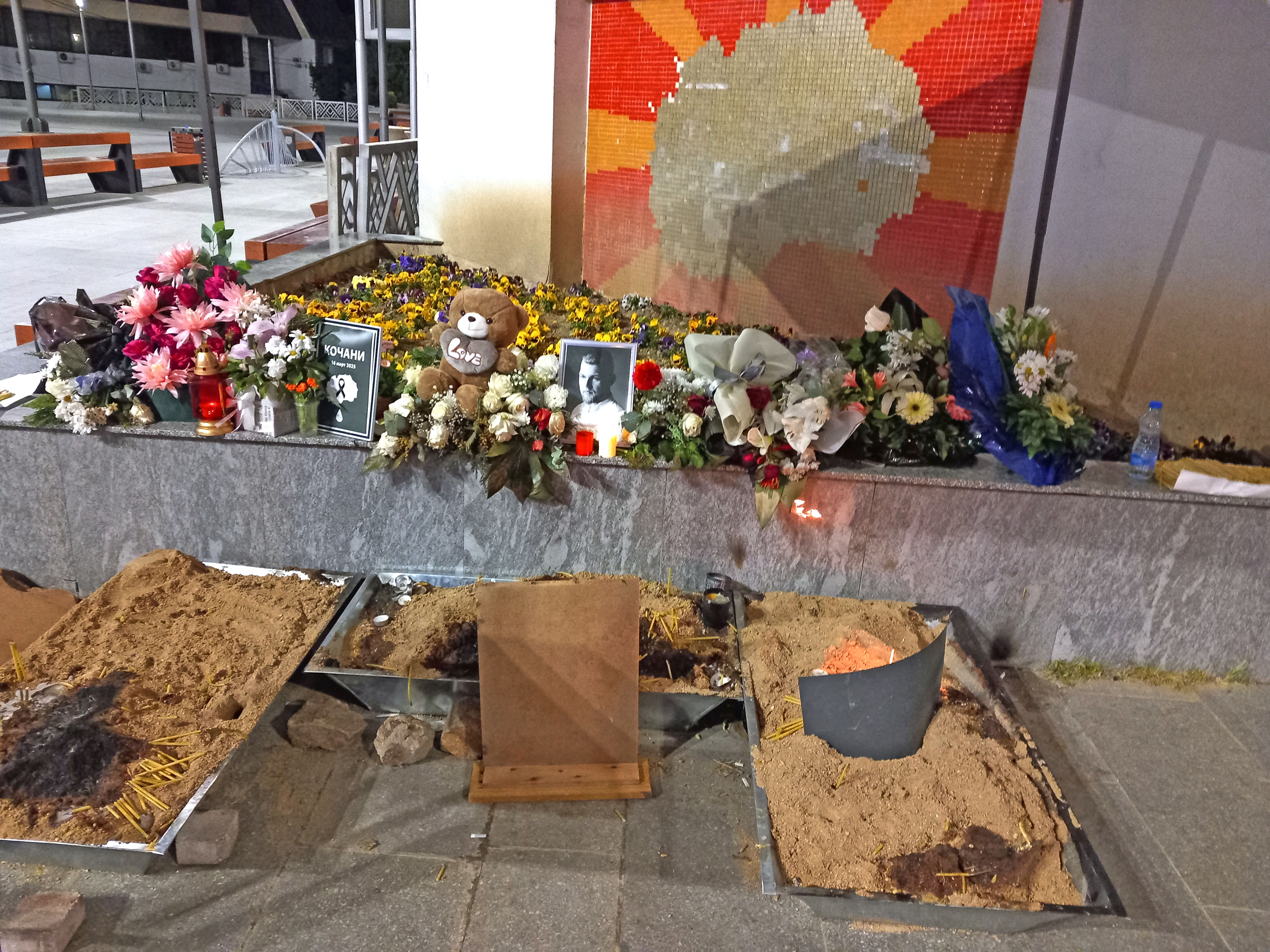
Paying tribute to Gjorgji Gorgjiev and the victims of the Kochani fire in Strumica

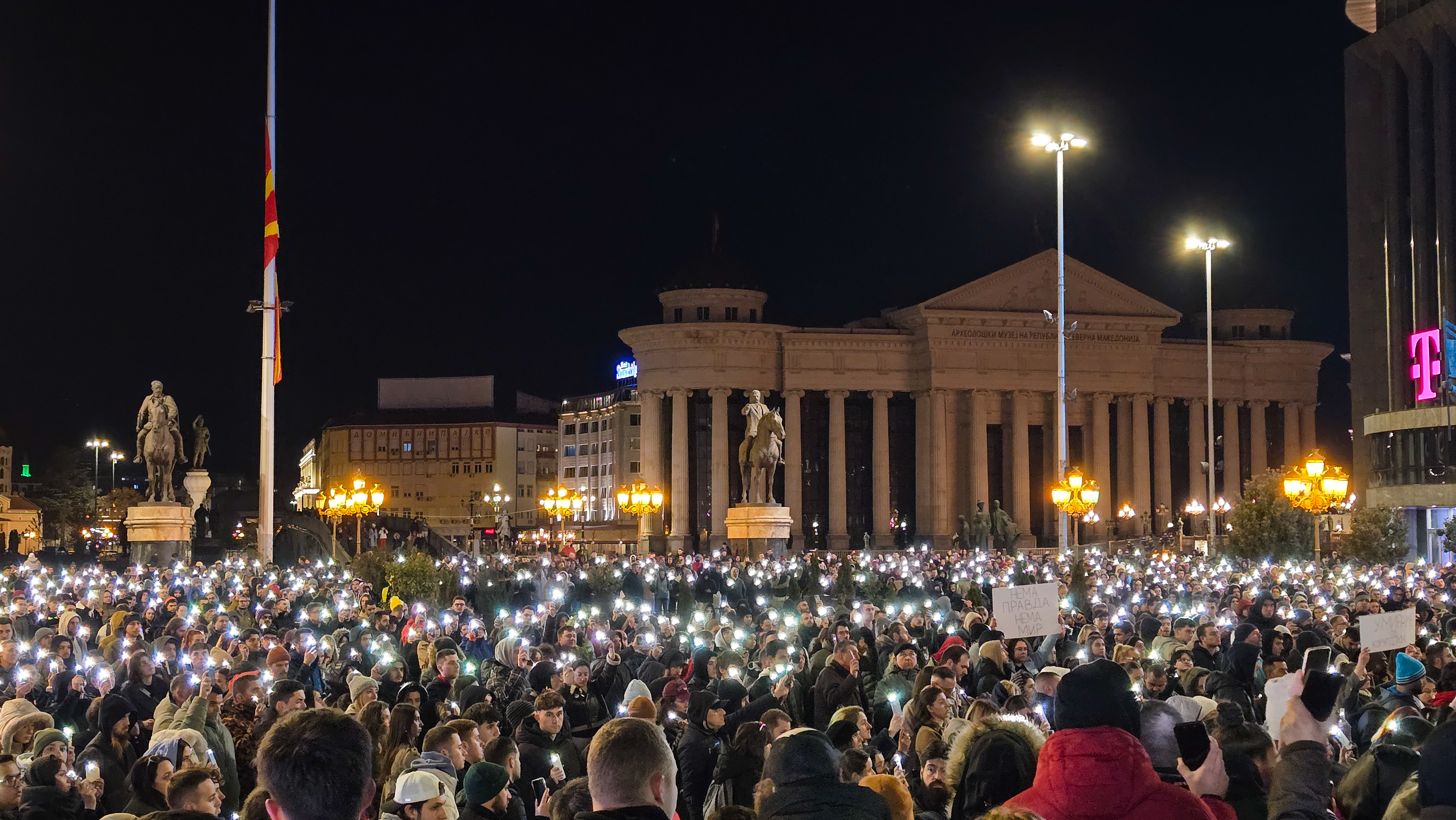
People gathered at Macedonia Square in Skopje to honor the victims of the Kočani nigthclub fire

On 16 March 2025, a fire at the Pulse nightclub in Kočani, North Macedonia, killed 63 people and injured 193. The fire started when sparks from indoor fireworks hit the ceiling and set it alight, rapidly enveloping the venue in thick and toxic smoke. The nightclub was unlicensed and broke numerous safety standards: among other things, it lacked sprinklers and sufficient emergency exits and only had a single fire extinguisher. Rescue efforts were hampered by the nightclub's location in a densely populated neighbourhood, which caused firetrucks difficulty in reaching it.

== Production ==
The film was financed privately by Milcho Manchevski through Banana Film, without support from the Film Agency, in collaboration with and supported by "Support Kocani". The director, producers, and distributors have given up their profits, and all proceeds from the film will go to the victims of the Kocani tragedy. Manchevski said that the filmmakers began recording the survivors only a month after the disaster as a gesture of respect and solidarity.

== Release ==
Good People had its World Premiere at the 32nd Sarajevo Film Festival, where it competed for Heart of Sarajevo award in the Competition Programme – Documentary Film 2026 on 16 August 2026.

== Reception ==
Writing for Cineuropa, Veronica Orciari at 32nd Sarajevo Film Festival, found Milcho Manchevski’s Good People difficult to assess purely on cinematic or technical grounds, given the gravity of the tragedy it documents. She noted that the film evokes 2026 Crans-Montana bar fire, in Switzerland, and similar disasters around the world, while seeking to give a voice to the victims and pursue a sense of justice for them. Orciari observed that the film is formally austere and relies extensively on interviews and "talking heads"; although this is generally a limited cinematic device, she considered it only choice here because little visual footage of the events exists. Much of the tragedy is therefore reconstructed through the testimonies of those interviewed. Orciari also highlighted the filmmakers' decision to forgo their profits, with the proceeds intended for the victims of the Kočani tragedy.

== Accolades ==
Award	Date of ceremony	Category	Recipient	Result	Ref.
Sarajevo Film Festival	21 August 2026	Heart of Sarajevo	Good People	Nominated	
