= DNK (duo) =

Macedonian hip-hop duo

- Origin: Skopje, North Macedonia
- Genres: Hip-hop
- Years active: 2001–2025
- Past members: Andrej Gjorgjieski (Andrej DNK); Vladimir Blažev (Pančo)

DNK (Macedonian: ДНК) were a Macedonian hip-hop duo from Skopje. The duo consisted of Vladimir Blažev, known as Pančo (29 July 1979 – 14 October 2025), and Andreja Gjorgjieski (9 February 1982 – 16 March 2025), known as Andrej DNK. In 2025, while they were performing at a night club in Kočani, a fire broke out, which killed Andrej and seriously injured Vladimir. Six other members of the team supporting the duo died in the disaster. Vladimir died from the injuries 7 months later.

== History ==
As artists with prior music experience and education, Andrej DNK and Pančo started a band in 2001, and released their first single shortly afterward. In 2010, DNK released their debut album titled It's Everything, through their home house "Production Republic", as a producer Vrcak appears, and the album consists of 18 songs, including the single "Full Moon", "Keep Me", "Purposed to You", "She Hides".

In September 2011, DNK held their first concert at the Metropolis Arena in Skopje.

In June 2012, DNK released the single "Plane" as an announcement of the upcoming album Heart. The album Heart, released in 2013, has 15 songs including "Dada", "Whatever it Wants It" and "From Morning to Dark". In September 2012, DNK held an acoustic concert at the Universal Hall Skopje, supported by the Chamber Orchestra and Live Band.

In 2016 DNK released the album Another Day. This album has 12 songs, including: "Only She Knows How", "Dearest", "Dark Is", "It's from Shutka". In May 2017, the duo celebrated 15 years of existence with a concert at the Metropolis Arena in Skopje. In 2018, they released the compilation "The Best of", which contains 22 songs and bonus song "Diamond".

In 2019 they released four singles: "If you knew everything", "Romeo and Juliet", "We" and "Up or down".

In early 2020 DNK released the single "Call me" with an animated video. In March, they held an online concert on YouTube and Facebook.

=== Kočani nightclub fire ===
On 16 March 2025, Gjorgjieski was killed in the Kočani nightclub fire, along with the band's photographer Aleksandar Efremov, backing singer Sara Projkovska, drummer Gjorgji Gjorgiev and keyboard player Filip Stevanovski. Two of the band members survived the initial fire, but died later in the afternoon. Blažev suffered burns to his face and hands, and was given oxygen therapy. All members of the band died as a result of the fire. Blažev initially survived, but after a long treatment, died on 14 October 2025.

== Members ==
- Vladimir Blažev - Pančo (29 July 1979 in Skopje – 14 October 2025)
- Andreja Gjorgjieski (9 February 1982 – 16 March 2025)

== See also ==
- Music of North Macedonia
