= Louis Ziskin =

Founder of DropIn, Inc live video platform (born 1969)

- Born: October 17, 1969 (age 56); Los Angeles, California, U.S.
- Education: USC
- Occupations: Chief Executive Officer, DropIn, Inc.

Louis Ziskin (born October 17, 1969) is CEO and founder of DropIn, Inc. an on-demand live video platform catering at launch to the insurance and automotive industries.

== Early life ==
In 1997, Ziskin became a major importer of the drug 3,4 methylenedioxymethamphetamine (more commonly known as ecstasy) in Los Angeles, running the largest MDMA smuggling operation in US history. Ziskin et al imported the drug to the United States via Europe.

Ziskin was taken into custody in December 1, 2000 and charged in CR 00-24(D)-RSWL, for transactions beginning in November 1999 and continuing up until the seizures of December 22, 1999. Ziskin was convicted of smuggling 700 pounds of ecstasy into Southern California via FedEx and other various shipping companies, the largest-ever United States government seizure of the drug and subsequently sentenced to a term of imprisonment.

On December 14, 2000, Ziskin was charged in an indictment in the case CR 00-852(D)-CAS, stemming from drug-trafficking actions that took place between January 2000 and September 2000.United States v. Ziskin, 360 F.3d 934, 401 (US 9th Cir 2003). Following his conviction in 00-24(D)RSWL, Ziskin lost a double jeopardy appeal for the second indictment CR 00-852(D)-CAS. Ziskin then filed to represent himself and after several highly contentious hearings concerning wiretap evidence and exculpatory information being withheld, the government settled all claims against Ziskin for a 188-month sentence and a 9 million dollar fine.

== DropIn ==
DropIn, Inc. is a remote on-demand video inspection platform that creates live video feeds of any place in the world, at any time. The service caters to the insurance and automotive industries.

== Philanthropy ==
In the time since his incarceration and subsequent release, Ziskin is a frequent public speaker lecturing about anti-recidivism and addiction recovery. He also gives regularly to organizations that contribute to addiction education.
