= Niš Military Hospital =

Coordinates: 43°18′45″N 21°55′17″E

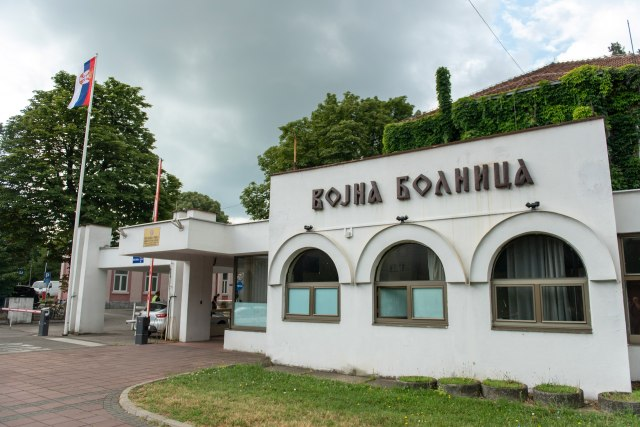
- The hospital building

Geography
- Location: Bulevar Dr. Zoran Đinđić bb., Niš, Serbia

Services
- Beds: 300

Links
- Website: http://vbnis.mod.gov.rs/

The Niš Military Hospital (Serbian: Војна болница Ниш, Vojna bolnica Niš), located in Niš, Serbia, is a healthcare institution under the Serbian Armed Forces, serving as a teaching base for the Faculty of Medicine in Niš. It provides primary and secondary (specialist) healthcare, along with certain tertiary (subspecialist) services, catering to both military and civilian beneficiaries. The hospital operates across seven inpatient departments, offering a total of 300 beds.

Established on January 11, 1878, shortly after Niš was liberated from Ottoman rule, the military hospital was initially the only healthcare facility in the city until 1881. Due to the high number of patients and injured individuals at the time, it functioned across two locations, one of which was near the Skull Tower, along the road to Pirot, where the hospital remains to this day.

Recognized as one of Serbia’s oldest medical and military institutions, the Military Hospital Niš has played a significant role in the development of healthcare in the Niš region and beyond. Over its history, the hospital has operated through nine wars, contributing to the evolution of medical services in the area.

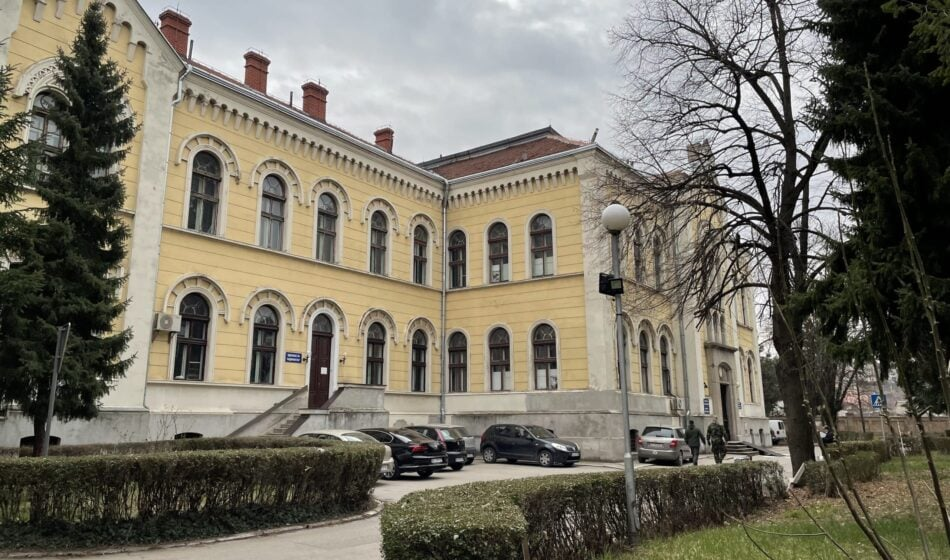
Niš Military Hospital building
