= Willow (2019 film) =

2019 film

- Macedonian: Врба
- Directed by: Milcho Manchevski
- Written by: Milcho Manchevski
- Starring: Sara Klimoska, Natalija Teodosieva, Kamka Tocinovski, Nenad Nacev, Nikola Risteski, Petar Caranovic
- Cinematography: Tamás Dobos
- Edited by: Nicolas Gaster
- Music by: Kiril Dzajkovski
- Release date: 19 October 2019
- Running time: 101 minutes
- Countries: North Macedonia; Belgia; Hungary; Albania
- Language: Macedonian

Willow (Macedonian: Врба, romanized: Vrba) is a 2019 Macedonian drama film by Milcho Manchevski. It is about three women coping with issues of control over their bodies, tradition and adoption. The film premiered at the Rome Film Festival in 2019. А Macedonian-Belgian-Hungarian-Albanian coproduction, it screened at a number of international film festivals, winning several awards: Silver Palm at Mostra de Valencia, best director at Raindance, best film at Cinequest, Manuel De Oliveira Award at Fantasporto etc.

== Plot ==
Three women – one medieval, two contemporary – struggle to become mothers. They have not set out to change the world or society, but their struggles with tradition, loyalty, adoption and control over their bodies make them unlikely heroines.

== Cast ==
- Sara Klimoska as Donka
- Natalija Teodosieva as Rodna
- Kamka Tocinovski as Katerina
- Nikola Risteski as Milan
- Petar Caranovic as Kire
- Nenad Nacev as Branko
- Ratka Radmanovic as Grandma Srebra
- Petar Mircevski as Stavre
- Blagoj Chorevski as Mancho
- Laze Manaskovski as Father Avram

== Awards ==
- Raindance — Best Director, 2020
- Fantasporto — Manuel De Oliveira Award, 2020
- Wellington Independent Film Festival — Best Feature Film, 2020
- Cinequest — Best Narrative Feature Film, 2020
- Mostra de Valencia — Silver Palm, 2020
- Stony Brook Film Festival — Jury Award Best Feature, 2021

== See also ==
- List of submissions to the 93rd Academy Awards for Best International Feature Film
- List of Macedonian submissions for the Academy Award for Best International Feature Film
