= Andrej E. Skubic =

Slovene writer, playwright and translator

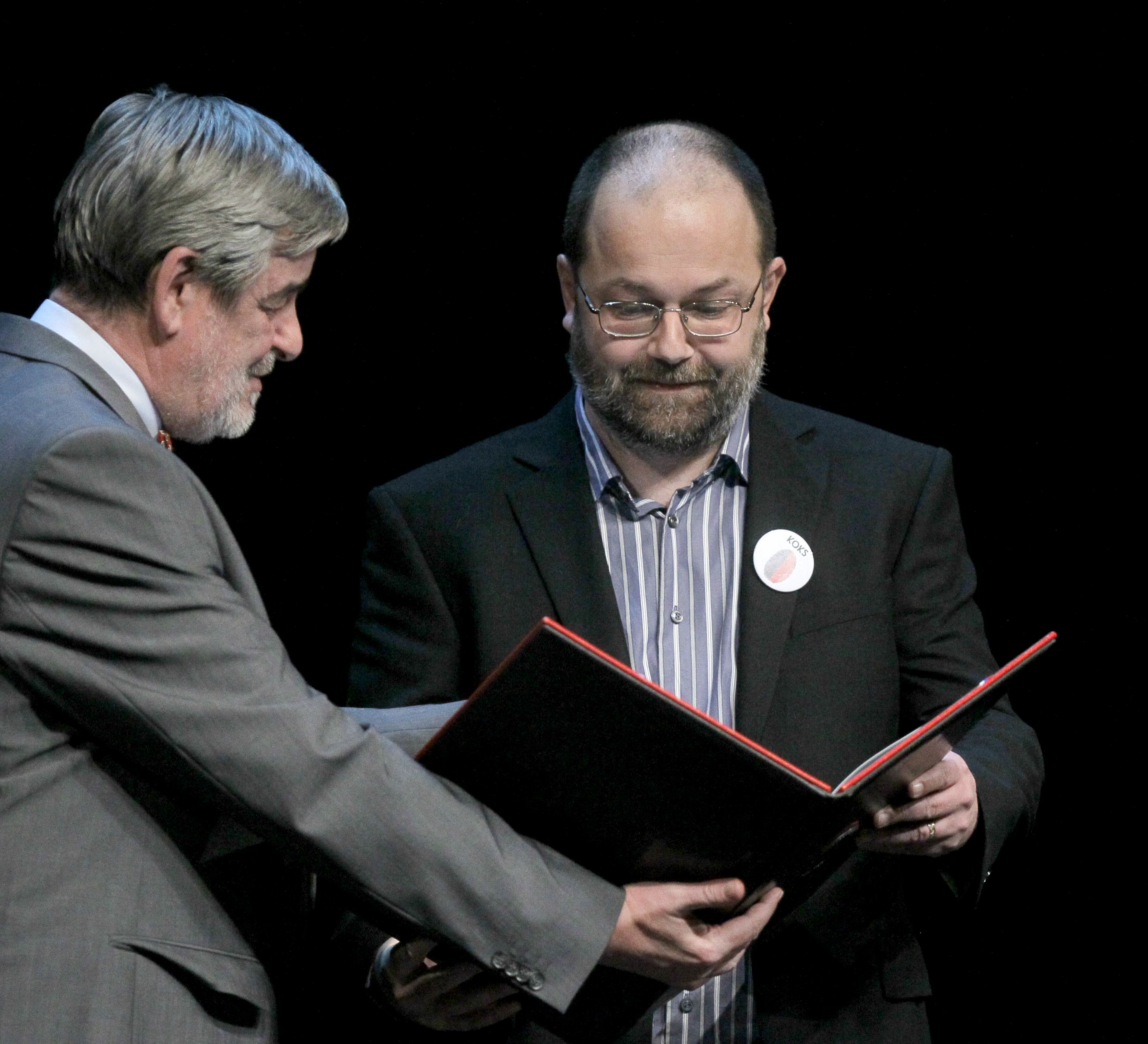
- Andrej E. Skubic in 2012
- Born: 28 December 1967 (age 58); Ljubljana, Slovenia
- Occupations: Writer; translator; playwright
- Writing career
- Notable works: Grenki med, Fužinski bluz
- Notable awards: Kresnik Award; 2000 Grenki med Prešeren Foundation Award and Kresnik Award; 2012 for Koliko si moja?

Andrej Ermenc Skubic (born 28 December 1967) is a Slovene writer, playwright, and translator.

Skubic was born in Ljubljana in 1967. He studied English and Slovene at the University of Ljubljana's Faculty of Arts, and he also worked at the faculty from 1998 to 2004, when he received his doctorate in sociolinguistics.

In 2000 he won the Kresnik Award for his novel Grenki med, in 2007 the Župančičeva Award of the City of Ljubljana for his novel Popkorn and in 2012 the Prešeren Foundation Award and the Kresnik Award for his novel Koliko si moja?

He lives in Ljubljana and works as a freelance writer and translator. Among others he has translated into Slovene works by Irvine Welsh, Flann O'Brien, Patrick McCabe, James Joyce, Samuel Beckett, and Gertrude Stein. In 2007 he received the Sovre Award for exceptional literary translation for his translations of the selected writings of Gertrude Stein and James Kelman's novel How Late It Was, How Late (Slovene: Kako pozno, pozno je bilo).

== Selected works ==
- Grenki med (Bitter Honey), novel, (1999)
- Fužinski bluz (Fužine Blues), novel, (2001)
- Norišnica (Madhouse), short stories, (2004)
- Obrazi jezika, book on linguistics, (2005)
- Popkorn (Popcorn), novel, (2006)
- Lahko, novel, (2009)
- Neskončni šteti dnevi, drama, (2009)
- Hura, Nosferatu, drama, (2009)
- Koliko si moja?, novel, (2011)
- Pavla nad prepadom, drama, (2013)
- Samo pridi domov, novel, (2014)
