= Tamer Ibrahim =

Egyptian businessperson

- Born: July 23, 1974 (age 51); Cairo, Egypt
- Occupation(s): Co-founder, DropIn, Inc.

Tamer Ibrahim (born July 23, 1974) is the co-founder of DropIn, Inc. an on-demand live video platform.

== Early life ==
Ibrahim immigrated to the United States when he was 4 years old. As a teenager, Ibrahim dabbled in small crime, which later grew to dealing in ecstasy.

== Ecstasy trading ==
Ibrahim traded ecstasy during 1997–2000, sometimes partnering with Louis Ziskin. Ibrahim would import the drug to the United States via Europe. Ibrahim's operation was smuggling hundreds of kilos of Ecstasy into the United States. Ibrahim's operation saw its first major loss in December 1999, when packages ready to ship, were reopened by an associate. The associate removed an amount of ecstasy out of each box and put them together into a new box that was shipped to Israel. This package was discovered by the Israeli customs and because the associate used the same shipping accounts, all the other boxes were red-flagged by FedEx and the DEA were notified. The DEA conducted a control delivery of a package in the U.S. which led to the arrest of multiple people who ultimately cooperated with the authorities. It also led to the seizure of close to a million dollars and 900 pounds of ecstasy. Ibrahim continued to work to make up for the loss until he became a fugitive after one of his shipments containing over 1000 pounds of ecstasy was seized in July 2000. After seeing news of the seizure on television, Ibrahim fled to Amsterdam via Mexico, while United States authorities raided Ibrahim's Los Angeles residence, seizing $988,000 in cash, a Ferrari, Range Rover, and Porsche, and other valuables.

Ibrahim was taken into custody in September 2000, by Dutch authorities in Amsterdam under an international arrest warrant from the United States. While imprisoned, Ibrahim fought extradition for 18 months while interred at the EBI (maximum security unit) at the Nieuw Vosseveld in Vught in the Netherlands, which serves as the max security prison for the country. Ibrahim was extradited to the United States in 2002. At the conclusion of his case, USA vs. Tamer Ibrahim (CAS-000852) on July 26, 2004, Ibrahim was sentenced to 188 months and a $4.5 million restitution and a $4.5 million fine for Continuing Criminal Enterprise.

In 2008, Ibrahim won a writ of Coram Nobus from the 9th Circuit Court of Appeals, which saw Ibrahim get released in April 2010 (instead of 2014). The fines levied against Ibrahim were wiped clean due to money and property coming up missing.United States v. Ibrahim, F.3d (US 9th Cir April 2008).

== DropIn ==
DropIn, Inc. is a remote on-demand video inspection platform that creates live video feeds of any place in the world, at any time. The service caters to the insurance and automotive industries.

== Philanthropy ==
Ibrahim is a frequent donor to California Youth Charity for at-risk youth.
