= Milcho Manchevski =

Macedonian-American film director

Milcho Mancevski
- Милчо Манчевски
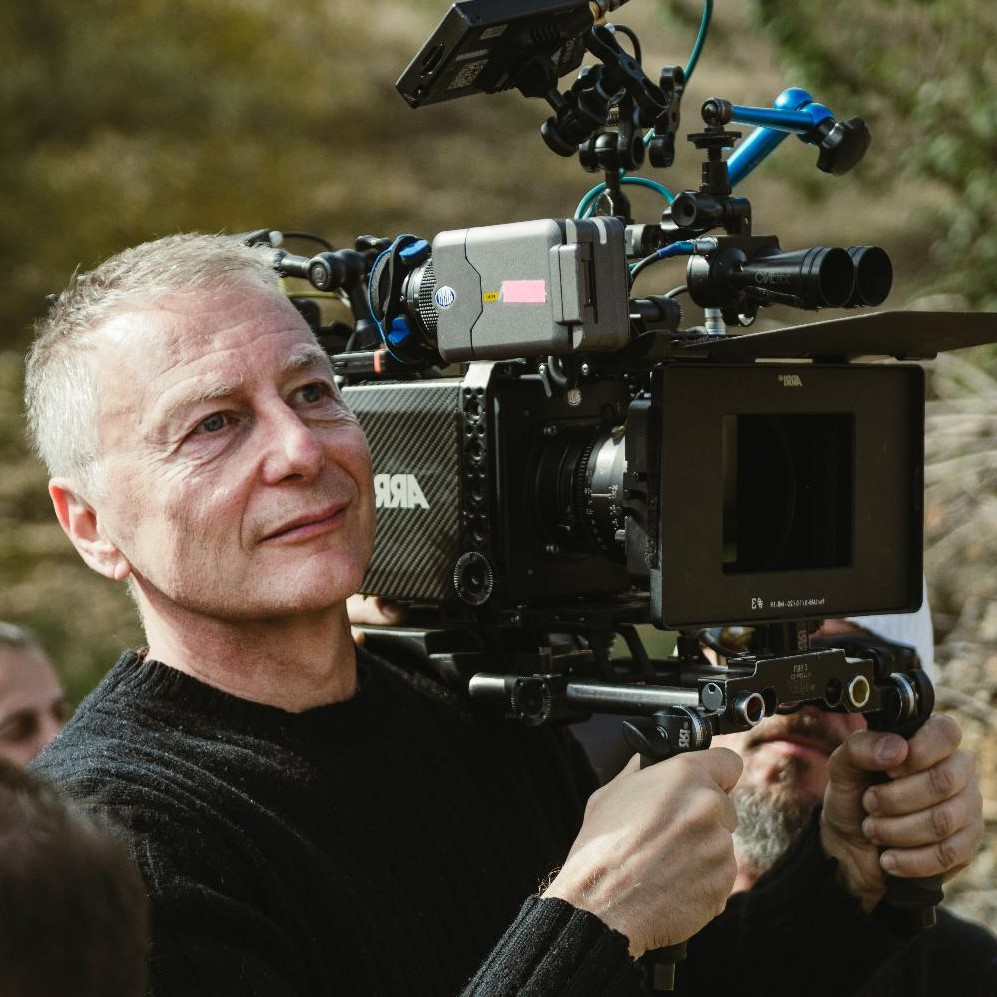
- Manchevski during the filming of Bikini Moon
- Born: 18 October 1959 (age 67); Skopje, SR Macedonia, FPR Yugoslavia
- Occupations: film director, photographer, artist
- Years active: 1985–present
- Website: manchevski.com

Milcho Manchevski (Macedonian: Милчо Манчевски, pronounced [ˈmilt͡ʃɔ ˈmant͡ʃɛfski]) is a Macedonian-American film director, photographer and artist.

== Life ==
Milcho Manchevski was born on 18 October 1959 in Skopje, PR Macedonia, FPR Yugoslavia. He studied at the Faculty of Philosophy in Skopje's University. In 1982, he graduated from the Faculty of Film and Photography in Southern Illinois University. Since 1985, he has been living in New York and Skopje. Manchevski has dual citizenship. Manchevski's Before the Rain was called "one of the greatest debut feature films in the history of cinema" by Annette Insdorf. The New York Times included it in its Guide to the Best 1,000 Films Ever Made list. It won the Golden Lion in Venice, Independent Spirit, was nominated for an Academy Award and won 30 other awards.

He has made the multiple award-winning films, such as Dust, Shadows, Mothers, Bikini Moon and Willow. In addition, he's directed many music videos and shorts as such The End of Time, Thursday, Macedonia Timeless, Tennessee and 1.73. For Macedonia Timeless, which was during the term of prime minister Nikola Gruevski, he directed clips depicting a continuity between Alexander the Great's ancient Macedonia and Republic of Macedonia (now North Macedonia). He was elected as an honorary ambassador to New York in 2007. Manchevski is also an honorary member of the Writers' Association of Macedonia.

Manchevski won the Best Director award at the 2020 Raindance Film Festival for Willow.. In Augustus 2026 his first feature documentary, Good People, premiered at Sarajevo Film Festival..

== Filmography ==
=== Feature and documentary films ===
| Year | Film | Director | Writer | Producer | Awards / Notes |
|---|---|---|---|---|---|
| 1994 | Before the Rain | Yes | Yes | No | Golden Lion at Venice Film Festival, Independent Spirit, Academy Award nomination, FIPRESCI |
| 2001 | Dust | Yes | Yes | No | Golden Reel Award Nomination (Best Sound Editing), 2002 |
| 2007 | Shadows | Yes | Yes | Yes | Syracuse Film Festival, 2008: Best Actress nomination, Vesna Stanojevska, Park City Film Music Festival |
| 2010 | Mothers | Yes | Yes | Yes | FEST: Special Jury Prize in the selection Europe Out of Europe, 2011, FEDEORA |
| 2017 | Bikini Moon | Yes | Yes | Yes | Directors' Week Special Jury Award at Fantasporto |
| 2019 | Willow | Yes | Yes | Yes | Best Director at Raindance; Best Feature Film at Cinequest, Mostra de València – Silver Palm |
| 2022 | Kaymak | Yes | Yes | Yes | |
| 2026 | Good People | Yes | Yes | Yes | Documentary |
| 2026 | Sister Brother Manhole Cover | Yes | Yes | No | Tokyo Grand Prix at the Tokyo International Film Festival |

=== Short films ===
- The End of Time (2017)
- Thursday (2013)
- Buddies: Race – Skopsko for Us (2015)
- Buddies: Filip – Skopsko for Us (2015)
- Buddies: Green Car – Skopsko for Us (2015)
- Macedonia Timeless: Mountains (2008)
- Macedonia Timeless: Temples (2008)
- Macedonia Timeless: Archaeology (2008)

=== Television ===
- The Wire ("Game Day") (2002)

=== Music videos ===
- Kiril Dzajkovski – Red Safari (2019)
- Kiril Dzajkovski – Dawn (2019)
- Krte Rodzevski – Eh Ljubov (2019)
- Nina Spirova – Eden baknez (2007)
- Kiril Dzajkovski – Jungle Shadow (2007)
- Kiril Dzajkovski – Primitive Science (2001)
- Kiril Dzajkovski – The Dead Are Waiting (2001)
- Kiril Dzajkovski – Brothel Tango (2001)
- Roachford – This Generation (1994)
- Arno Hintjens – Vive ma liberte (1993)
- George Lamond – Baby I Believe in You (1992)
- Sonia Dada – You Ain't Thinking (About Me) (1992)
- School of Hard Knocks – A Dirty Cop Named Harry (1992)
- Arrested Development – Tennessee (1991)
- Riff – If You're Serious (1991)
- Deskee – Kid Get Hyped (1991)
- Partners in Kryme – Undercover (1990)
- Bastion – Hot Day in Mexico (1985)
- Leb i sol – Aber dojde, Donke (1983)
