= Dust (2001 film) =

2001 Western film

- Theatrical release poster
- Directed by: Milcho Manchevski
- Written by: Milcho Manchevski
- Produced by: Chris Auty; Vesna Jovanoska; Domenico Procacci
- Starring: Joseph Fiennes; David Wenham
- Cinematography: Barry Ackroyd
- Edited by: Nicolas Gaster
- Music by: Kiril Džajkovski
- Production companies: The Film Consortium; Fandango; Shadow Films; South Fork Pictures
- Distributed by: Highlight Film; Pathé
- Release dates: 29 August 2001 (Venice); 3 May 2002 (United Kingdom)
- Running time: 127 minutes
- Countries: Macedonia; United Kingdom; Italy; Germany
- Languages: English; Macedonian

Dust is a 2001 Western film in which centuries and continents intertwine in an intricate tapestry. Its fractured narrative resembles a Cubist painting.

The UK-Italian-German-Spanish-Macedonian co-production, written and directed by Milcho Manchevski, stars Joseph Fiennes, David Wenham, Adrian Lester, Rosemary Murphy, Nikolna Kujaca, Anne Brochet, and Vera Farmiga. It was the opening-night film of the 2001 Venice Film Festival and was later released in a number of countries, including the United States.

== Plot ==
In present-day New York City, a young criminal, Edge, is confronted at gunpoint by an ailing old woman, Angela, whose apartment he is attempting to burgle. While he awaits an opportunity to escape, she launches into a tale about two outlaw brothers, Luke and Elijah, at the turn of the 20th century, who travel to Ottoman-controlled Macedonia. The two brothers have transient ill will between them, and they become estranged when confronted with a beautiful woman, Lilith.

In the New York storyline, Edge hunts for Angela's gold to pay back a debt, and gradually grows closer to her. In the Macedonian story, the brothers end up fighting for opposite sides of a revolution, with the religious Elijah taking up sides with the Ottoman sultan and gunslinger Luke joining "the Teacher", a Macedonian rebel.

== Cast ==
- Joseph Fiennes as Elijah
- David Wenham as Luke
- Adrian Lester as Edge
- Anne Brochet as Lilith
- Nikolina Kujaca as Neda
- Rosemary Murphy as Angela
- Vlado Jovanovski as The Teacher
- Salaetin Bilal as The Major
- Vera Farmiga as Amy
- Matt Ross as Stitch

== Production ==
The film was written and directed by Milcho Manchevski. The music for the film was composed by Kiril Džajkovski. Principal photography took place in a number of countries and locations, including Cologne, New York City, Mariovo and Bitola.

== Release ==
Dust opened at the Venice Film Festival on 29 August 2001 and was later released in Italy on 5 April 2002. Pathé distributed the film in the United Kingdom on 3 May 2002. In Spain, the film was released on 12 July 2002 by Alta Classics. It was given a limited release in the United States on 22 August 2003, where it was distributed by Lionsgate.

== Reception ==
=== Critical response ===
The film caused controversy when it premiered as the opening film of the 2001 Venice Film Festival. A number of critics accused Manchevski of having a political agenda and using the film to express it. The Evening Standard critic Alexander Walker claimed the film was portraying the Turkish army in a bad light and even called it racist. Several other critics saw the film as taking sides in the then armed conflict in Macedonia, in spite of the fact that filming took place before the hostilities began. Charges were nevertheless leveled that Manchevski's film was anti-Muslim, anti-Albanian and anti-Turkish. He did not respond to the accusations in Venice, presumably hoping the film would speak for itself. He, however, did respond later, explaining that the film was even-handed in its portrayal of brutal killers – it did not spare the Macedonians, Albanians, Turks, Greeks – or the Americans, for that matter. Even though the reviews (and even some of the original reviewers) were more nuanced once the film moved from Venice to the regular theaters, the damage was done, and Dust never achieved the wide distribution expected from the follow-up to the successful Before the Rain.

The film received mostly mixed to negative reviews from film critics. On the review aggregator website Rotten Tomatoes, the film holds a 20% rating, based on 15 critical reviews. David Stratton of Variety gave the film a poor review, writing, "Essentially a Euro Western, spectacularly lensed in Macedonia [the] film borrows freely and unwisely from superior predecessors in the genre, while struggling to explore interesting themes involving the personal legacy we hand down to our descendants. [The film's] main problem in positioning itself commercially is that it straddles the genres: It's too arty to cut it as a violent action pic and too gore-spattered to appeal to the arthouse crowd."

Kevin Thomas of the Los Angeles Times wrote, "Dust is a bust, a big bad movie of the scope, ambition and bravura that could be made only by a talented filmmaker run amok." Elvis Mitchell of The New York Times wrote, "Milcho Manchevski's stylized western, Dust, is a potent, assured and ambitious piece of filmmaking brought down by weighted dialogue and, playing Americans, the British actors Adrian Lester and Joseph Fiennes and the Australian David Wenham. This dazzling and dazed movie begins on the streets of contemporary New York, as a camera moseys down a street and then crawls up the side of a building, peering into several windows as various apartment dwellers play out their lives. It's as if Mr. Manchevski were thumbing through a selection of stories as we watch, deciding which appeal to him the most."

Later, though, the film was reassessed in a number of essays focusing on its complex fractured narrative.

=== Accolades ===
Year	Award	Category	Recipient(s)	Result
2004	Golden Reel Award	Best Sound Editing in a Foreign Feature Film	Peter Baldock, Jack Whittaker, Philip Alton, Tim Hands, Daniel Laurie, Richard Todman	Nominated
