= Guns of War =

- Directed by: Žika Mitrović
- Written by: Ana Marija Car; Arsen Diklić; Žika Mitrović
- Starring: Boris Buzančić; Božidarka Frajt; Rade Šerbedžija; Neda Arnerić; Petre Prličko; Marko Nikolić; Dušan Vojnović; Branko Milićević; Aljoša Vučković; Marko Todorović; Ružica Sokić; Mija Aleksić
- Cinematography: Predrag Popović
- Edited by: Katarina Stojanović
- Music by: Zoran Hristić
- Release date: 1974
- Running time: 170 minutes
- Country: SFR Yugoslavia
- Language: Serbo-Croatian

Guns of War (Serbo-Croatian: Užička republika/Ужичка република, lit. 'Republic of Užice') is a 1974 Yugoslav film directed by Žika Mitrović. It is one of the most notable examples of partisan film, a Yugoslav subgenre of World War II films which was popular between the 1960s and 1980s. The prevailing themes of anti-fascist struggle set in wartime Yugoslavia are also present here, as the film tells the story of the rise and fall of the Republic of Užice, a short-lived territory liberated by Yugoslav partisans which existed for several months in 1941.

The film shows several love stories unfolding on the backdrop of historical events and includes appearances by Miodrag Lazarević as Chetnik leader Draža Mihailović and Marko Todorović as Josip Broz Tito.

The film won two Golden Arena awards at the 1974 Pula Film Festival, the Yugoslav national film awards, including Best Film and Best Supporting Actress (Ružica Sokić). It was also entered into the 9th Moscow International Film Festival where it won a Diploma.

== Main cast ==
- Boris Buzančić – Bora
- Božidarka Frajt – Nada
- Branko Milićević – Miša
- Milutin Mićović – Radovan
- Aljoša Vučković – Luka
- Rade Šerbedžija – Chetnik mayor Kosta Barac
- Marko Nikolić – Klaker
- Ivan Jagodić - Ilija
- Ružica Sokić – Mira
- Neda Arnerić – Jelena
- Dušan Vojnović – Sava
- Mija Aleksić – Toza
- Petre Prličko – baker Pero
- Vasa Pantelić – Dragi Simić
- Bogoljub Petrović –Chetnik captain Đorđević
- Dragan Ocokoljić – Partisan doctor
- Miodrag Lazarević – Colonel Dragoljub Mihailović
- Božo Jajčanin – Captain Duane Hudson
- Marko Todorović – Josip Broz Tito
