= Aleksandar Džambazov =

Macedonian conductor and composer

- Александар Џамбазов
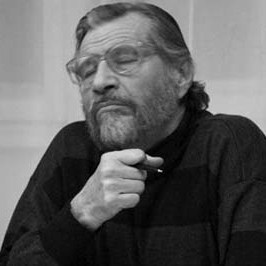
- Born: 3 February 1936; Stapar, Vojvodina, Kingdom of Yugoslavia
- Died: 25 January 2022 (aged 85); Skopje, North Macedonia
- Occupations: Conductor, composer
- Spouse: Anche Džambazova
- Children: Igor Džambazov, Tatjana Džambazova

Aleksandar Džambazov (Macedonian: Александар Џамбазов; 3 February 1936 in the village Stapar, Vojvodina, Kingdom of Yugoslavia – 25 January 2022 in Skopje, North Macedonia) was a Macedonian conductor and composer. He finished Musical academy in Belgrade, and spent majority of his career at Macedonian Radio Television, as a conductor of the Dance and Special orchestra. Has made numerous recordings and live concerts, and has performed in North Macedonia and in many countries abroad (mostly in Slovenia). He has won many (around 50) awards.

He is the spouse of Anche Dzambazova, father of Igor Džambazov and Tatjana Dzambazova.

== Work ==
His work as a composer is prolific and diverse. He is an author of popular songs, jazz scores, children's songs and some classical pieces. He is one of the founders and a longtime composer and conductor of the children's festival Zlatno Slavejče in Skopje. He also wrote scores for theatre plays and movies Memento, music for the plays Mother, "Two on a swing" etc.) and classical music, such as Seven dance variations for piano and orchestra, Rhapsody for Skopje (1966) – also for piano and orchestra that won him the European Gershwin prize. Has composed choral compositions, and a great number of popular melodies.

== Documentary ==
Documentary about Aleksandar Dzambazov by Buzarovski Archive
