= Janevski =

Janevski, Yanevski or Ianevski (Macedonian: Јаневски; Bulgarian: Яневски) is a Macedonian surname. Notable people with the surname include:

- Čedomir Janevski (born 1961), Macedonian footballer and current manager
- Jane Janevski (born 1920), Macedonian football manager and former player
- Marjan Janevski (born 1988), Macedonian basketball player
- Slavko Janevski (1920–2000), Macedonian artist
- Stanislav Ianevski (born 1985), Bulgarian actor
- Vlado Janevski (born 1960), Macedonian singer

== See also ==
- Yanev
