= Macedonian Blood Wedding (film) =

Macedonian Bloody Wedding Македонска крвава свадба Makedonska krvava svadba
- Directed by: Trajče Popov
- Written by: Slavko Janevski
- Starring: Kole Angelovski; Vera Čukić; Zvezda Angelovska; Dragomir Felba; Zafir Hadžimanov; Dragi Kostovski; Petre Prličko; Risto Šiškov; Janez Vrhovec; Pavle Vuisić
- Edited by: Vangel Laki Čemčev
- Music by: Kiril Makedonski
- Distributed by: Vardar Film
- Release date: 1 January 1967
- Running time: 102 minutes
- Country: Yugoslavia
- Language: Macedonian

Macedonian Blood Wedding (Macedonian: Македонска крвава свадба, romanized: Makedonska krvava svadba), also known as Bloodshed at the Wedding, is a 1967 Yugoslav historical drama directed by Macedonian director Trajče Popov. The screenplay was written by Slavko Janevski and is based on the 1900 play of the same name by the Bulgarian playwright Voydan Chernodrinski. The film was released through the production company Vardar Film. It tells the story of a young Macedonian woman Cveta who is kidnapped by a Turkish bey in Ottoman Vardar Macedonia. It follows her resistance to converting to Islam and renouncing her national identity along with the uprising of the locals against the Ottomans.

== Synopsis ==
The movie is based in Ottoman Vardar Macedonia and tells the story of a young woman named Cveta who is kidnapped by an Ottoman Turk in hopes of eloping with her. The film shows Macedonian villagers working on the fields for one of the numerous beys in the region. The bey is trying to persecute a Turkish man and wants to punish him for his progressive ideas. One of the Macedonian villagers, Spase the shepherd, helps the man escape which subsequently brings the bey to the fields where the villagers do their work. Present among the working villagers is Cveta, who stands out from the crowd with her beauty. The bey kidnaps the girl and takes her to his saray along with the other women-wives who form part of his harem.

At the saray, Cveta is pressured to change her religion, renounce her family and adopt the Ottoman culture and values and eventually become one of the Bey's many submissive wives. To lure her in, the bey promises her fortune and an easy life. When the other villagers find out about the bey's forceful acts against her will, they gather in front of his house led by a priest and Spase (Cveta's love interest), and they demand that she be freed. Since their attempt is not successful, they take the case to court. Diplomatic lawyers from Bitola get involved in the case and they rule that Cveta go back to her family.

Once free again, she decides to marry Spase and they start preparing for their wedding in the fictional village Stradalovo. However, during the celebrations the bey comes together with his soldiers in an attempt to prevent the event. He faces Spase and tries to shoot him for stealing his wife. Cveta goes in front of Spase and the bullet kills her immediately. Furious and heartbroken, all the villagers rise against the Turks in a heated armed conflict with a lot of victims. Spase and the bey fight with each other, and the former kills the bey by hitting him with a rock on the head and running away to join the rebel band Komitadji to fight against the Ottoman rule in the region. The film ends with the villagers mourning and burying Cveta.

== Cast ==
- Risto Šiškov as Osman Bey
- Vera Čukić as Cveta, the kidnapped girl
- Zafir Hadžimanov as Spase, Cveta's love interest
- Petre Prličko as Mojso
- Pavle Vuisić as Pop Damjan
- Janez Vrhovec as Kuzman
- Dragomir Felba as Orhan
- Nikola Kole Angelovski as Kole Angelovski
- Ilija Milčin as the "Valija" i.e. the Governor

== Background and production ==
Macedonian Blood Wedding is a film adaptation of the eponymous play by Voydan Chernodrinski first published and shown in theaters in Sofia, Bulgaria in 1900. This book is considered one of the most important works in Macedonian literature in North Macedonia.

The film takes place in the second half of the 19th century, a period during which North Macedonia was still under the rule of the Ottoman Empire and local Slavic population was subjected to Islamization and oppression. It is set in the period of the empire being in a state of anarchy, during which the Turks widely terrorized the population. As such, both the original play and the film's main topic are the unbearable life of the Macedonian population. Macedonian Blood Wedding marked Popov's directorial debut. It was released through the production company Vardar Film which also released the first-ever Macedonian film Frosina (1952). Filming took place in several cities in then SR Macedonia including Bitola, Tetovo as well as the production company's studios in the country's capital Skopje. The film was shown in Ohrid in early June 1968. The music score for the film was written by Kiril Makedonski and was performed by the Slovenian filharmonia.

== Awards ==
Following the film's screening at the Croatian Pula Film Festival in 1968, Nikola Lazarevski received a Golden Arena for Best Production Design. The following year, the film received a Golden award with Lenin's face to honor its success in the Soviet Union.

== See also ==
- List of Macedonian films
- List of Yugoslavian films
- Cinema of North Macedonia
