= Dzandar Zbira =

- Џандар збира
- Starring: Igor Dzambazov
- Country of origin: North Macedonia

Dzandar Zbira or Jack folds (Macedonian Cyrillic: Џандар збира) was a television quiz in North Macedonia hosted by Igor Dzambazov.

== See also ==
Television in North Macedonia
