= Once Upon a Time in the East =

Once Upon a Time in the East can refer to:

- Once Upon a Time in the East (1974 film), a 1974 Canadian film
- Once Upon a Time in the East (2011 film), a 2011 Bulgarian film
