= Slavko Janevski =

Macedonian writer (1920–2000)

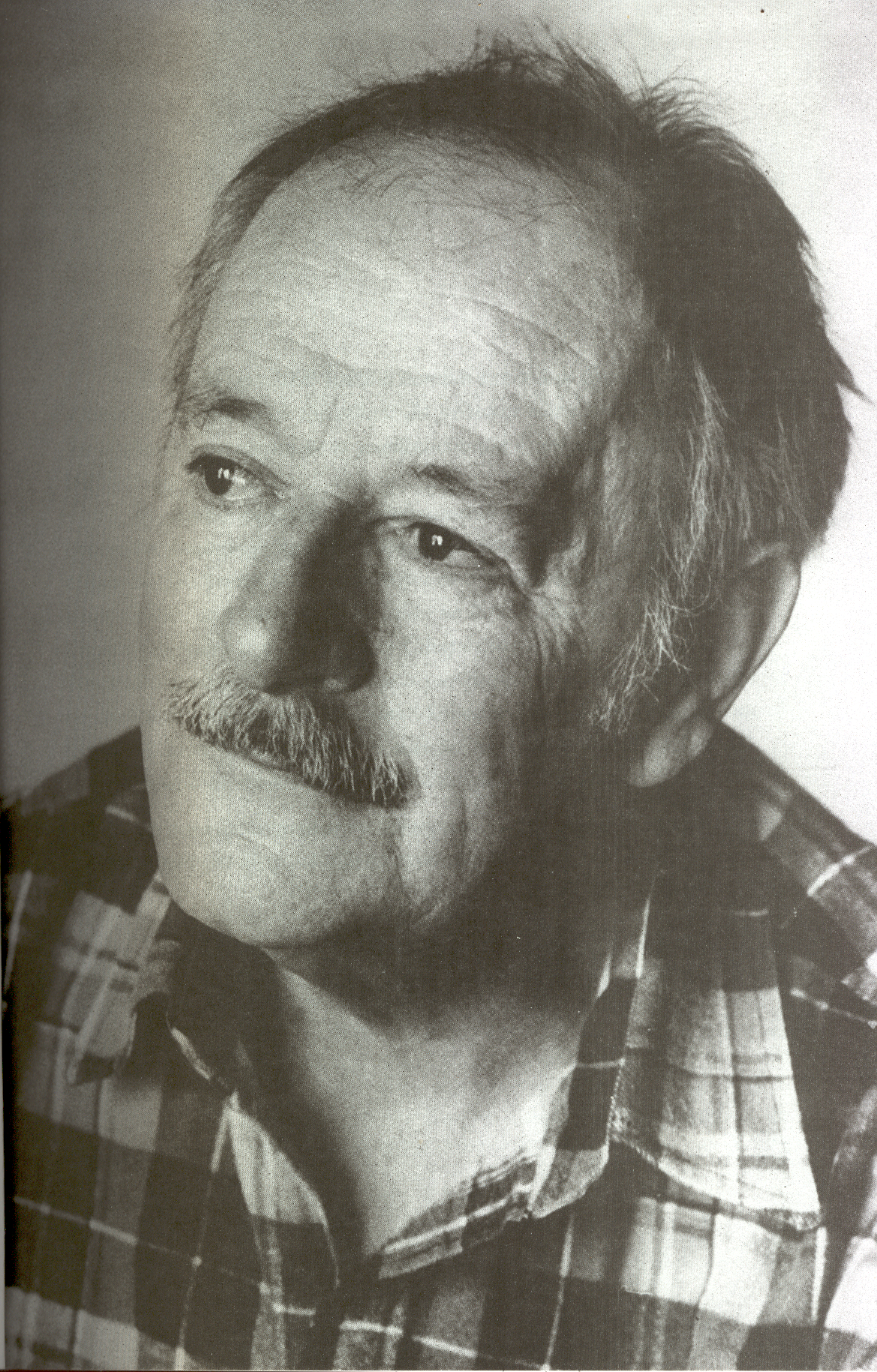
- Born: January 11, 1920; Skopje, Kingdom of Yugoslavia (now Republic of North Macedonia)
- Died: January 20, 2000 (aged 80); Skopje, Republic of Macedonia
- Occupations: writer, editor and comic artist
- Years active: 1945–2000

Slavko Janevski (January 11, 1920 – January 20, 2000) was a Macedonian poet, prose and script writer. He was also active as a comic artist. From 1945 onwards he was the editor of the first teenage magazine called "Pioner" (Pioneer). Janevski is the author of the first novel to be written in Macedonian, Seloto zad sedumte jaseni (A Village Behind the Seven Ash-trees). As a script writer, he adapted the historical drama Macedonian Blood Wedding in 1967. Janevski is considered as a founder of Macedonian poetry.

== Biography ==
Janevski was born in Skopje on January 11, 1920. From an early age, he had been interested in literature and art. He completed technical school in Skopje. During World War II in Yugoslav Macedonia, he was a member of the Macedonian Partisans. Janevski is the first known ethnic Macedonian author of a comic strip and he published the first comic strip in Macedonian in 1945. He began writing poetry during World War II and published his first poetry collection Krvava niza (A Bloody Garland) in 1945. Janevski also published other collections, such as Egejska barutna bajka (Aegean Gunpowder Fairy Tale) in 1950 and Evangelije po Itar Pejo (The gospel according to Itar Pejo) in 1966. He was a member of the editorial board of the publishing house "Kultura" (Culture), which started operating by 1945. Since 1945 he had been the editor of the first Macedonian children's newspaper "Pioner" (Pioneer), and then he was the editor-in-chief of several literary magazines, such as: the children's magazine "Titovce", the magazines for literature and art "Nov den" (New day) and "Sovremenost" (Contemporaneity), the literary newspaper "Horizont" (Horizon) and the humorous-satirical newspaper "Osten". In the meantime he worked as an editor in the publishing houses "Kočo Racin", "Naša kniga" (Our book) and "Makedonska kniga" (Macedonian book).

In 1947, he was a founder of the Writers' Association of Macedonia, as well as its third president. He was also a member of the Macedonian PEN Center. Janevski published the first novella Ulica (Street) in 1950 and the first novel Selo zad sedumte jaseni (A Village Behind the Seven Ash-trees) in 1952 in Macedonian. He was also a founder and member of the Macedonian Academy of Sciences and Arts in 1967.

Janevski also left a mark in Macedonian cinema, as the author of several film scripts: in 1967, he adapted the classic historical play by Voydan Chernodrinski, "Macedonian Blood Wedding", into the 1967 film Macedonian Blood Wedding directed by Trajče Popov; collaborated with Pande Tashkovski on the film adaptation of the epic war novel "Dosledni na zavetot" (True to the Covenant), renamed Makedonski del od pekolot (Macedonian Part of Hell), directed by Vatroslav Mimica; and adapted his own humanistic novel "Dve Marii" (Two Marys) for the film entitled "Jazol" (Knot), directed by Kiril Cenevski. In 1960, he directed the film David, Goliath and the Rooster. Janevski received the awards, "AVNOJ"; "Miladinov brothers" award, the award of the City of Skopje "13 November", "Kočo Racin", "Macedonian Word" and others. He also won two Golden Arenas for Best Screenplay at the Pula Film Festival, for the films Wolf's Night (1955) and Macedonian Part of Hell (1974). He was awarded the Order of Brotherhood and Unity with a golden star and the Order of" Merits to the People with a golden star. He died on January 20, 2000.

== Legacy ==
In memory of his work, on January 29, 2010, in the park "Zena borec" (Woman warrior) in Skopje was unveiled a monument to him, which was the work of academic sculptor Tome Serafimovski.

In 2013, the Lustration Commission of Republic of Macedonia announced that it had concluded that Slavko Janevski was a collaborator of the Yugoslav communist secret services, spying on artists and writers, and claiming that some wrote "bad literature", under the pseudonym "Slavjan." His file was not published. This resulted in condemnations of the decision by the Macedonian Academy of Sciences and Arts, Writers' Association of Macedonia, and the Macedonian PEN Center, as well as some academics. The commission rejected the complains as "unfounded", but a member of the commission called the decision "wrong", claiming that he was not a collaborator for ideological reasons.

In 2017, journalists and editors of the defunct newspaper Utrinski vesnik established the foundation "Slavko Janevski", with Janevski's daughter serving as the president of the board of directors. The Council of the City of Skopje declared 2020 the year of Slavko Janevski, in honor of the centenary of his birth.

== Selected bibliography ==
=== Novels ===
- Село зад седумте јасени (1952). A Village Behind the Seven Ash Trees
- Две Марии (1956). The Two Marys
- Месечар (1958). The Sleepwalker
- И бол и бес (1964). Both Pain and Rage
- тебла (1965). Tree Trunks
- The "Kukulino" Cycle:
  - Тврдоглави (1969). The Stubborn Ones
  - Легионите на Свети Адофонис (1984). The Legions of Saint Adofonis
  - Кучешко распетие (1984). Dog's Crucifix
  - Чекајќи чума (1984). Waiting for the Plague
  - Девет Керубинови векови (1986). The Nine Centuries of Kerubin, trans. Snežana Nikolovska-Nečovska (Detska Radost, 1997)
  - Чудотворци (1988). Miracle Workers, trans. Zoran Ančevski and David Bowen (Detska Radost, 1994)
  - Рулет со седум бројки (1989). Roulette with Seven Numbers
  - Континент Кукулино (1996). The Kukulino Continent
- Миракули на грозомората (1987). The "Miracles of Horror" trilogy. Compiles: The Legions of Saint Adofonis, Dog's Crucifix, and Waiting for the Plague

=== Novellas and short stories ===
- Улица (1950). Street
- Кловнови и луѓе (1954). Clowns and People
- Ковчег (1976). Ark
- Зад тајната врата (1993). Beyond the Secret Door

=== Poetry ===
- Крвава низа: лирски фрагменти (1945). A Bloody Garland
- Пионери, пионерки, бубачки и шумски ѕверки (1946). Boys, Girls, Beetles and Forest Beasts
- Скаменетиот Орфеј (1990). Petrified Orpheus
- The Bandit Wind: Poems, trans. Charles Simic (Dryad Press, 1991). Bilingual edition of selected poems.
- The Palette of Damnation (1995). Bilingual edition of selected poems.

=== Children's literature ===
- Шеќерна приказна (1952). Sugar Story
- Сенката на Карамба Барамба (1959). The Shadow of Karamba Baramba
- Марсовци и глувци (1959). Martians and Mice
- Црни и жолти (1967). Black and Yellow
- Каинавелија (1968). Cainavelia
- Децата од светот (1987). The Children of the World
- Пупи Паф (1992). Poopy Puff
