= Miss Stone =

Miss Stone may refer to:

- Miss Stone Affair, the kidnapping of American Protestant missionary Ellen Maria Stone
- Miss Stone (film), a 1958 Yugoslav historical film about the Miss Stone Affair
