= Macedonian Blood Wedding =

1900 play by Voydan Chernodrinski

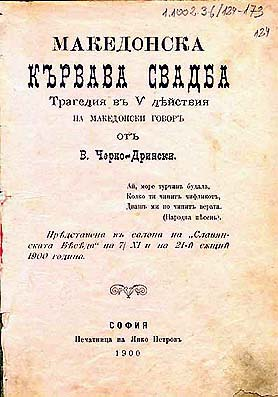
- Original language: Macedonian Debar dialect
- Written by: Voydan Popgeorgiev – Chernodrinski
- Characters: Cveta; Spase; Osman Bey; Duko

Premiere
- Date: November 7, 1900
- Place: Sofia, Bulgaria

Macedonian Blood Wedding (original title: Македонска кървава свадба, transliterated as Makedonska Karvava Svadba) is a play by the Macedonian Bulgarian playwright Voydan Chernodrinski. It was first published and shown in theaters in Sofia, Bulgaria, in 1900. The drama was written in the Macedonian Debar dialect and in standard Bulgarian, making it one of the first books written mostly in a Macedonian dialect.

The play tells the story of a young woman Cveta who is kidnapped by the bey who rules the fictional village Stradalovo. It follows her resistance to be converted to Islam and to renounce her identity along with the parallel revolt of the locals against the Ottomans and their mistreatment of the local population. Chernodrinski was inspired to write the play after he read a real-life story of a girl from Valandovo who was kidnapped from the fields by an Ottoman agha.

In North Macedonia Macedonian Blood Wedding is considered one of the most important works in Macedonian literature. It has received numerous stage adaptations, and has been adapted in Bulgaria as an opera in 1924, in Yugoslavia as a film in 1967, and in North Macedonia as a musical in 2012. The play is also considered part of the history of Bulgarian theater. While in the original drama the author referred to the play's characters and to himself as Bulgarians, his identity and the play's subjects' ethnicity are disputed today between Macedonian and Bulgarian scholars.

== Plot ==
Macedonian Blood Wedding is classified as a tragedy in five acts. The first act opens with a description of villagers working in the fields for the bey of the fictional village Stradalovo. The love between Cveta, an Orthodox girl and Spase, a shepherd from the village is also depicted. A turnover point arises with the kidnapping of Cveta by Osman bey one day while she works in the field with her family members during the harvest season. He takes her to his harem where he tries to change her ethno-religious identity.

At the harem, Cveta is pressured by the bey, the Muslim Priest Selim and two girls, Krsta and Petkana, who had succumbed to the pressure and are now the bey's wives. Cveta consistently opposes to such demands and at one instance, she hits the bey. In the meantime, Cveta's brother Duko and the young shepherd Spase, her love interest are strongly objecting to the forceful kidnapping in front of his harem. Afterward, they go to the consulate in Bitola and receive an order to go inside the harem and look for the girl, but they cannot find her as the bey has hidden her.

Her relatives report the case to the mayor, the consuls in Bitola and Carigrad where the seat of the Ottoman Sultan is. This forces the mayor to have a public ruling of the case where Cveta is asked in front of all her relatives and the officials whether she wants to become Turkish. After spending 12 days as the bey's hostage, Cveta appears in court. She initially claims she voluntarily escaped with the bey and that she loves him as Selim, a Muslim Priest who works for the bey tries to mar her mind by giving her opiates. She immediately gains back her consciousness and denies her claims.

The court rules that she be free again and preparations for her wedding with Spase in the village begin. Furious that the girl escaped, Osman bey goes together with his soldiers to the event, attempting to forcefully take her back to his harem for a second time. All the villagers start protesting and the conflict escalates as the bey kills Duko. Cveta, in turn, stabs him with his knife. In the end, one of Osman Bey's soldiers kills her and before her death, she reiterates that she died but did not become Turkish.

== Background and conception ==
The play takes place in the late 19th century, when the region of Macedonia was still under the rule of the Ottoman Empire. The local Slavic population was then a subject to forced Islamization and oppression. The author found inspiration to write the play in the real-life case of a girl named Bozhija Manadzhieva from Valandovo about which he read in the newspaper Reformi. The girl, who worked on the fields for an agha was kidnapped by the Turkish and was taken to Thessaloniki. Substantiating his motifs to write the play, Chernodrinski explained in the preface of Macedonian Blood Wedding:

What did I write? I [personally] did not write anything. I only copied from the still unwritten bloody history of Macedonia, that which the reader will read and the spectator will see in the theater. Of the bloodlust of our Turkish beys, the preparedness of female Macedonians to die and not to change their religion and the manhood of the Macedonian man to courageously avenge the bloodshedders who will try to taint his family honor, that is mainly what the content of the play consists of.

== Elements ==
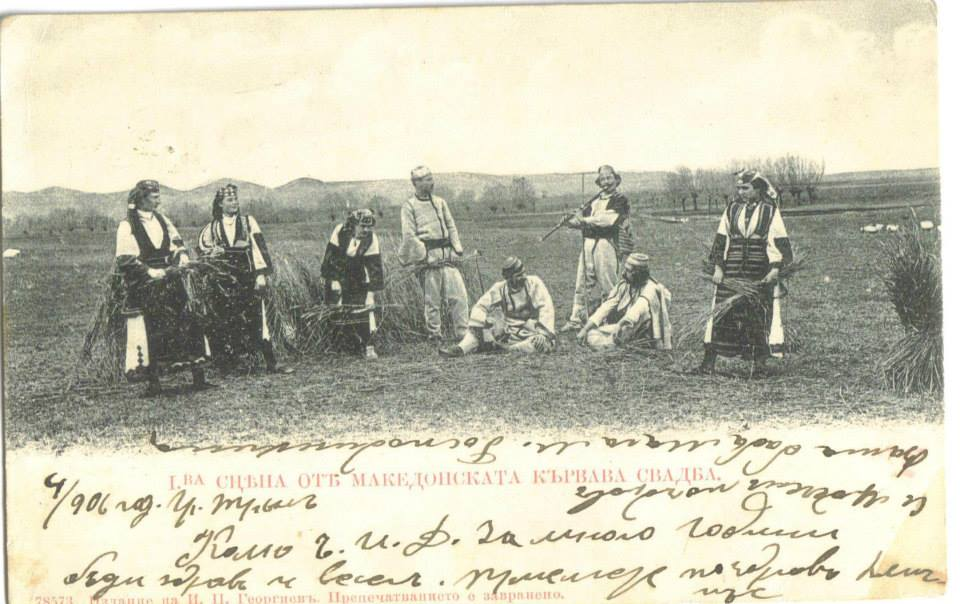
Postcard from the early 20th century, depicting the first scene from the play

Typical of Chernodrinski's work is the frequent use of folklore elements in his literary work. In Macedonian Blood Wedding, folklore songs are used during scenes of villagers working and during Cveta and Spase's wedding. Some of the topics of the songs are love, the everyday life and customs of the villagers and robberies committed by the Turks. According to scholars Tole Belchev and Ranko Mladenovski from the Goce Delčev University of Štip, the inclusion of these songs makes the literary work similar to an antique tragedy, and they saw the songs included as a replacement of the choir. Scholars in North Macedonia also point that the play's main topic is "the hard and unbearable position of Macedonians under Turkish rule" in the last years of Ottoman rule in the region of Macedonia.

At the beginning of the play, a snake is used as a foreboding sign for the arrival of the evil, namely Osman Bey. Other symbols used in the play are the names of geographical places and characters. Namely, the village Stradalovo is derived from the word for suffering, which implies the sufferings of the villagers who live there. Spase's name comes from the word "spas" for "saving" and "savior" as he is the one who saves Cveta from the Bey. According to Belchev and Mladenovski, Osman Bey's character resembles other folklore stories in which the female protagonist is typically kidnapped by a dragon.

== Release ==
The play was written in 1900 and its premiere was scheduled for 7 November in Sofia with a performance by Chernodrinski's theater group Skrab i uteha. In order to avoid additional exasperation of its relations with its neighbour – the Ottoman Empire, the government banned the premiere of the openly anti-Turkish play. However, the policemen sent to the theater encountered resistance from some activists of the Supreme Macedonian Committee, and the play took place.

Chernodrinski reworked it later to give the plot and the libretto for a new opera called Tsveta that was written by the Bulgarian composer Georgi Atanasov. On 23 November 1924, the opera of Maestro Atanasov was presented for the first time in Sofia, as well as aх exhibition with paintings based on the play by the eponymous drama by V. Chernodrinski. The author was also present at the premiere.

After the Balkan wars and the First World War, Chernodrinski released the 3rd edition (1928). In the foreword to the edition, he comments on the historical changes, not forgetting to mention the relevance of the material:

Although the regime of Old Turkey in Macedonia was replaced by two new Christian ones – the Serbian and the Greek – the sufferings of the Macedonian Bulgarians not only did not stop but on the contrary, became more unbearable.

The first performance of the play in the United States was made on the initiative of the Bulgarian priest Teophylact Malinchev in Granite City in 1908. In the mid-1930s, Aleksandar Shoumenoff from Gorno Dupeni, owner of the First Bulgarian Book Store in Granite City, published Chernodrinski's works. The text wasn't translated into English but the play became popular among the Macedonian Bulgarian emigration in the USA. In 1928, a People's Home was open in Toronto by the Macedono-Bulgarian Orthodox Church "St. Cyril and Methodius", where Macedonian Bloody Wedding was played for the first time in Canada.

The publishing house of the Greek Communist Party Nea Ellada, which worked then in exile in Bucharest, published the play in 1952. The books published by Nea Elada were written with the Bulgarian alphabet, but its language was an attempt to impose a new Macedonian language based on dialects from Greek Macedonia, different from the linguistic norm established in 1945 in Yugoslav Macedonia.

The play was initially released in People's Republic of Macedonia in 1953, followed by releases in 1969, 1974, 1975, and in 1992 as an adapted version.

== Linguistic analysis ==
Three editions of the play were published in Sofia; one in 1900, one in 1907 and a last one in 1928. Professor Maksim Karanfilovski from Ss. Cyril and Methodius University of Skopje argues that the language of the book cannot be solely attributed to the Debar dialect and notes that some of the features used are typical of the central dialects of Macedonian and some cross the borders of the language.

== Linguistic and nationality dispute ==
Chernodrinski's works were usually written in standard Bulgarian except for this drama, on the cover of which the author pointed himself that it was written in Macedonian dialect (Македонски говор). He spent most his life in Bulgaria and wrote the play in Sofia as a young man. As Bulgarian publicists maintain, the original drama referred to the play's characters as Bulgarians. Until the end of the Second World War, many linguists considered, Macedonian dialects as Bulgarian. Thus Bulgarian linguists still consider Macedonian dialects part of the Bulgarian diasystem, and the uniqueness of Macedonian is still a matter of political controversy in Bulgaria. From a Bulgarian linguistic point of view, the book was an attempt to write in a "Macedonian dialect" of the Bulgarian language.

After Chernodrinski's death in 1951, in 1953 in then SR Macedonia, the drama Macedonian Blood Wedding was transliterated into the newly codified Macedonian language. Parts of the text where the words "Bulgarian" were used in the original publications in 1900, 1907 and 1928, were replaced with "Christian" or "Macedonian" in the later Yugoslav editions of the play. All other texts besides conversations between the characters, such as the preface and the instructions to the actors which were written originally using the Bulgarian language, were subsequently translated to Macedonian. According to Bulgarian publicist Boris Dankov, such activities by the Macedonian literary experts, represent appropriation and macedonization of Bulgarian literature.

Serbian historian Andra Gavrilović writing for Brankovo Kolo in 1904, acknowledged that the play marked the debut of a "fourth South Slavonic South literary language, not just a patois". Elsewhere, it has been named the "play [that] created the basis for an indigenous vernacular tradition in drama". According to Chernodrinski's nephew, Arseni Yovkov, an IMRO revolutionary and publicist, the drama played a decisive role to prove to the local public in Yugoslavia, that Macedonian dialects are not part of the Serbian language, as it was claimed there. Per Yovkov, these dialects were part of Bulgarian dialect continuum, while his uncle's works reflected the Bulgarian liberation movement in Macedonia,

Comparison between the original text and the adaptation in North Macedonia
Act/Scene/Appearance	Original	Macedonian
Characters	Кърста, Петкана — Потурчени българки. English: Krsta, Petkana: Bulgarians turned to Islam	КРСТА, ПЕТКАНА – потурчени рисјанки: English: Krsta, Petkana: Christians turned to Islam
1/1/IX	Всички българи. English: All Bulgarians.	Сите: English: All:
1/1/IX	Българитѣ впущатъ се къмъ турцитѣ. English: The Bulgarians attack the Turks	Македонците се нафрлуваат на Турците. English: The Macedonians attack the Turks
2/IV	Консулата Сърбски, за да кажуваатъ, оту са Сърби, а не Бугари. English: The Serbian consulate to say they are Serbs and not Bulgarians	Консулата српски, за да кажуваат оту са Срби. English: The Serbian consulate to say they are Serbs
3/III	(Влизатъ: Кърста и Петкана, потурчени българки). English: Entering: Krsta and Petkana, Bulgarians turned to islam	(Излегуваат. По малку влегуваат Цвета, Крста и Петкана); English: Leaving. After a while entering Krsta and Petkana
3/IV	Еле той бугаринотъ, комита... English: Especially the Bulgarian, the rebel	Еле, тој ѓаур комита English: Especially the unbeliever, the rebel
3/V	Не, ние бугарки сме се родиле, мори сестро. English: No, we are Bulgarians by birth, sister	Не, ние рисјанки сме се родиле, мори сестро. English: No, we are Christians by birth, sister
3/V	Бугарки сте се родиле?! English: You are Bulgarians by birth?	Рисјанки сте се родиле?! English: You are Christians by birth?
3/V	Бугарки, бугарки бевне, мори сестро. English: Bulgarians, we were Bulgarians, sister	Рисјанки бевме, мори сестро. English: We were Christians, sister
3/V	Бугарки бефме, ама не потурчие! English: We were Bulgarians, but we were turned to Islam	Ама не потурчија! English: We were turned to Islam
3/V	Бугарки бефме, а сега туркини, пусти робони. English: We were Bulgarians, and now we're Turkish, poor slaves	Рисјанки бевме, а сега Туркини, пусти робинки. English: We were Christians, and now we're Turkish, poor slaves
3/V	Бугарки бефме, мори сестро, бугарки верувайне. English: We were Bulgarians, sister, Bulgarians, believe us	Не мори сестро, верувај, не. English: No sister, believe us, no
3/V	Ако вие бефте бугарки... English: If you were Bulgarians	Ако вие не бевте Туркини... English: If you were not Turks

== Modern day adaptations ==
The play is considered today as one of the most important works in Macedonian literature. The play was adapted into a film in 1967 under the direction of Macedonian director Trajče Popov. Following its screening at the Croatian Pula Film Festival in 1968, it received a Golden Arena for Best Production Design. The following year, the film also received a Golden award with Lenin's face to honor its success in the Soviet Union.

Following the premiere of the original play, it was shown in numerous cities across Bulgaria. Later, in 1953, the play had its first premiere at the Macedonian National Theater in Skopje. It was later widely shown in numerous other Macedonian cities. On 16 December 2012, a musical adaptation of the play premiered at the Dramski Theater in Skopje, directed by Croatian director and choreograph Staša Zurovac.
