= Žika Mitrović =

Serbian and Yugoslav film director, screenwriter and comics artist

- Born: 3 September 1921; Belgrade, Kingdom of Serbs, Croats and Slovenes
- Died: 29 January 2005 (aged 83); Belgrade, Serbia and Montenegro
- Occupations: Film director, screenwriter
- Years active: 1955–1986

Živorad "Žika" Mitrović (Serbian Cyrillic: Жика Митровић; 3 September 1921 – 29 January 2005) was a Serbian and Yugoslav film director and screenwriter.

== Career ==
He started his career as a comics artist. Mitrovic directed 20 feature films between 1955 and 1986. His 1974 film The Republic of Užice was entered into the 9th Moscow International Film Festival where it won a Diploma.

== Filmography ==
Year	Film	Director	Writer	Awards / Notes
1955	Ešalon doktora M.	Yes	Yes	
1956	Poslednji kolosek	Yes	Yes	
1957	Potrazi Vandu Kos	Yes	No	
1958	Miss Stone	Yes	No	
1960	Kapetan Leši	Yes	Yes	
1960	Signali nad gradom	Yes	No	
1961	Solunski atentatori	Yes	No	
1962	Obracun	Yes	Yes	
1963	Nevesinjska puška	Yes	Yes	
1964	Marš na Drinu	Yes	Yes	
1966	Witness Out of Hell	Yes	No	
1966	Do pobedata i po neba	Yes	No	
1967	The Knife	Yes	Yes	
1968	Brat doktora Homera	Yes	Yes	
1968	Operacija Beograd	Yes	Yes	
1969	Ubistvo na svirep i podmukao nacin i iz niskih pobuda	Yes	Yes	
1974	Užička Republika	Yes	Yes	Big Golden Arena for Best Film, Diploma at Moscow International Film Festival
1982	Savamala	Yes	Yes	
1983	Timočka buna	Yes	Yes	
1986	Protestni album	Yes	Yes	
