= Zafir Hadžimanov =

Yugoslav and Serbian singer (1943–2021)

- Зафир Хаџиманов
- Born: 25 December 1943; Kavadarci, Kingdom of Bulgaria
- Died: 27 March 2021 (aged 77); Belgrade, Serbia
- Citizenship: Yugoslav, Serbian
- Occupations: Actor; singer
- Notable work: Macedonian Blood Wedding

Zafir Hadžimanov (Macedonian: Зафир Хаџиманов; 25 December 1943 – 27 March 2021) was a Yugoslav, Serbian and Macedonian singer, composer and actor who spent most of his adult life in Belgrade.

== Biography ==
Zafir Hadžimanov was born on 25 December 1943 in Kavadarci, Bulgarian-occupied Yugoslav Macedonia, where he spent his childhood. His father was a folklorist. Hadžimanov studied at a high school together with a music school in Skopje. While studying in Belgrade in the 1960s, he performed as a singer of popular music. At the festival in Opatija in 1965, he won first place with the song Why do you come only with the rain. Four years later, at the same festival, he performed the song It Was May. Hadžimanov graduated from the Faculty of Dramatic Arts in Belgrade in 1967. He spent almost his entire life in Belgrade, marrying Yugoslav singer and actress Senka Veletanlić, with whom he had a son, Vasil Hadžimanov, a jazz musician. As a singer, he also performed abroad, especially in the Soviet Union. Hadžimanov sang the songs Like Vardar, Love me and the head above, There is no escape from love. He acted in the films Knife and Macedonian Blood Wedding. He authored the poetry collections "Chansons on Paper", "Asylum", "People's Singer", "Song-Singer" and "Brother", published in Macedonian and Serbian. Hadžimanov participated in the festivals Struga Poetry Evenings in 1975 and the International Festival of Chansons, in 2003. In 1991, he was a co-founder of the Macedonian-Serbian association Šar Planina and the association of Macedonians in Belgrade - "Makedonium". In 2007, he was promoted to honorary ambassador of Macedonian culture in Serbia.

Hadžimanov died from complications caused by COVID-19 on 27 March 2021, at the age of 77. President of Serbia Aleksandar Vučić posthumously honored him with the award Golden Medal for Merits on 29 June 2021. He is notable for his contribution to Macedonian music too. Hadžimanov was posthumously honored with the award Order of Merit for the Republic of North Macedonia by president of North Macedonia Stevo Pendarovski on 23 July 2021 for "his huge contribution to the specific poly-genre development in the field of artistic creation, for the rich and specific opus in the field of music, composition and vocal interpretation, for the innovative models of promotion of traditional Macedonian harmonies and specifics in the Macedonian music through contemporary and popular forms".
