= Theophylact Malincheff =

Canadian doctor (born 1884)

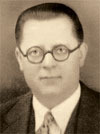
- Doctor Mallin
- Born: March 9, 1884; Vrachesh, near Botevgrad in Bulgaria
- Died: April 30, 1949 (aged 65)
- Education: Graduate
- Alma mater: Theological Seminary in Sofia

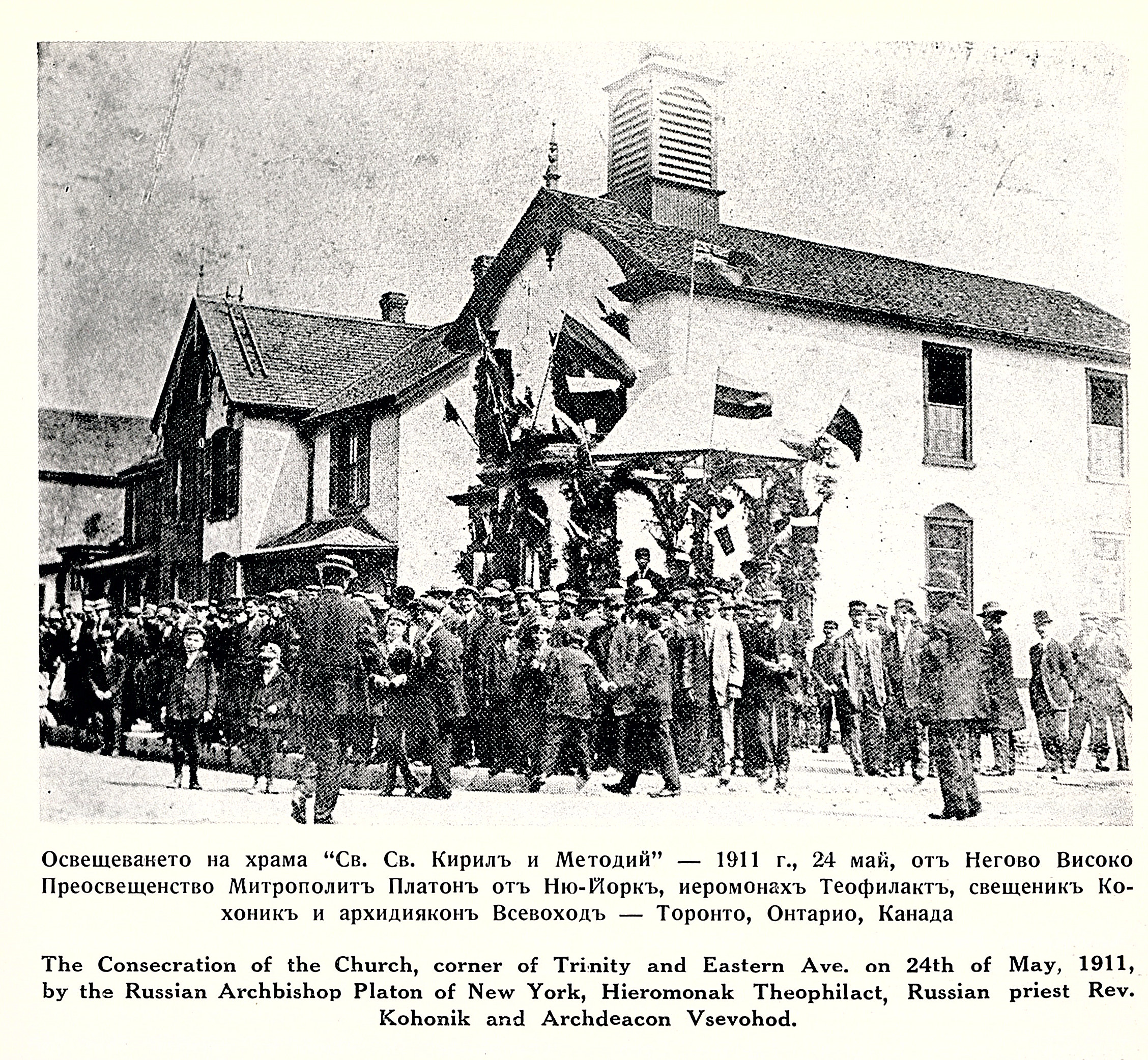
Consecration of the Eastern Orthodox Cathedral Sts. Cyril and Methodius in Toronto, 1911 with the presence of Archimandrite Theophylact.

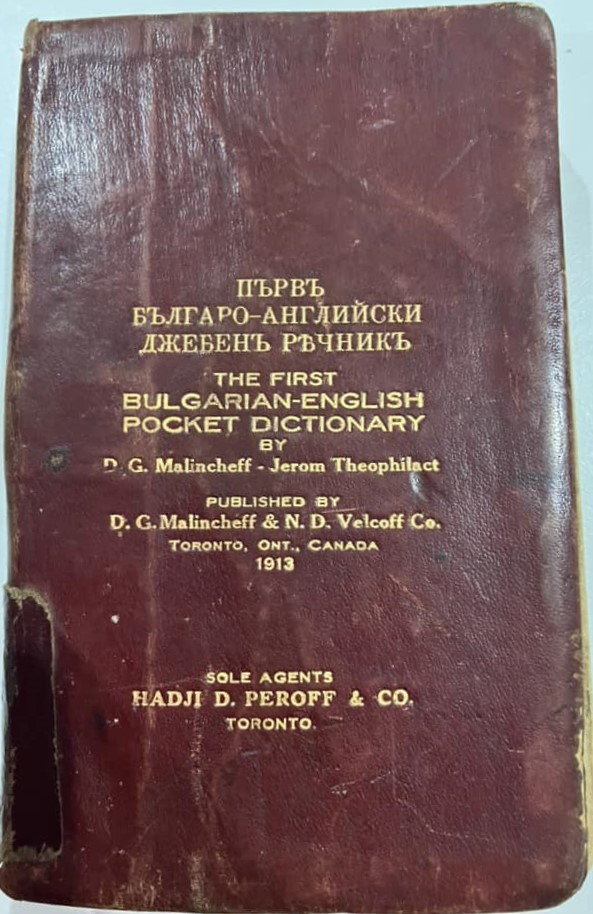
Bulgarian-English Pocket Dictionary - 1913.

Theophylact Malincheff also known as Demetrius Mallin was a key figure in the history of the Macedono-Bulgarian community in Toronto, Canada.

== Biography ==
He was born on March 9, 1884, in the village of Vrachesh, near Botevgrad in Bulgaria, with the secular name Dimitar Georgiev Malinchev. His brothers Petar and Hristofor were Bulgarian Army officers. He graduated from the Men's high school of Targovishte and joined the Internal Macedonian Revolutionary Organization. Malincheff participated in the Ilinden-Preobrazhenie Uprising in the region of Razlog Valley and in the area of Krushevo, near Serres. After the suppression of the uprising, he graduated from the Theological Seminary in Sofia. Archimandrite Theophylact was sent to North America in 1908 by the Bulgarian Holy Synod. During his mandate he initiated the creation of four Bulgarian orthodox churches in the US and Canada. He arranged for the opening of the first Bulgarian church in North America in Granite City in 1908 and later Madison in 1909. In the fall of 1909, Theophylact moved to the town of Steelton, Pennsylvania, where he left a third newly built Bulgarian church. Afterwards was organised the opening of the first Bulgarian church in Canada, in Toronto, 1911 - the Macedono-Bulgarian Orthodox Cathedral of Sts. Cyril and Methodius.

The first performance of the play Macedonian Blood Wedding in the United States was made on the initiative of Malinchevff in Granite City in 1908. He was the co-founder in Toronto of the "Macedonian-Adrianopolitan Bulgarian People's Organization" (MOBNO), called to unite all Bulgarians in North America. In 1913, Theophylact published The First Bulgarian-English Pocket Dictionary. The dictionary was published by the first Bulgarian publishing house in Canada. He organized the first Bulgarian-language evening school in North America. Malincheff edited also the first Bulgarian weekly newspaper in Toronto, called Balkanska zvezda (Balkan star) in 1912–1913. In September 1918, an Order banned all printed materials in all enemy languages, which included Bulgarian, because Bulgaria was a Central Powers ally during the First World War. The newly founded by Malincheff newspaper Zora (Dawn), had to stop.

He left the priesthood and in 1921 graduated from the Medical Faculty of the University of Toronto to become the first Bulgarian physician in Canada. On November 15, 1921, the Bulgarian received the specialty "surgeon". In 1922, he opened the first Bulgarian pharmacy in Toronto. Malincheff is recognized as the founder of the first Bulgarian Orthodox community in the city. In June 1921, Dr. Malin married Evgeniya Hristova from Kriva Palanka. In 1922 he sold his dictionary copyright to the Bulgarian printing house "Naroden Glas" in Granite City, Illinois. In 1929, he was among the initiators of the founding of the "William Gladstone Society" in Toronto, which was one of the strongest organizations of Bulgarians in North America at that time. In a speech to the parishioners of Sts. Cyril and Methody Church in 1927, Malincheff reminded his compatriots that they should not forget their homeland but should be also worthy citizens of Canada. Dr. Malin died on April 30, 1949, and was honored as the “Honorary President and Founder” of the parish.

== See also ==
- Bulgarian Canadians
- Bulgarian Diocese of the Orthodox Church in America
- Bulgarian Eastern Orthodox Diocese of the USA, Canada and Australia
