= Demir Yanev =

Syrian film producer and director

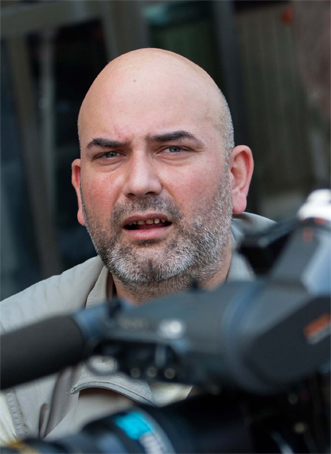
- Born: Demir Yanev Demirev; 9 August 1972; Damascus, Syria
- Occupations: Film director and producer
- Website: http://www.newlevel.tv

Demir Yanev (Bulgarian: Демир Янев) was born in Damascus, Syria and is a film producer and director.

== Biography ==
Yanev is the son of the Bulgarian diplomat Yancho Demirev (1960–1990) and grandson of the Bulgarian politician and communist bearing the same name. He lived in various places in the Middle East with his parents, and was educated in different cities, including Khartoum and Amman. He then completed four years of Arabian Studies at Sofia University, and acquired an associate degree in Banking management from the University of Veliko Tarnovo in 1997.

After several years in business enterprises in Sofia, Dubai and Istanbul, Yanev embarked on filmmaking, inspired by personal acquaintance in Dubai with the late Afghan leader, Abdul Haq in Dubai. He established his own film production company, New Level Productions in 2005 after several years collaboration with the theatrical anthropological group THEATREDREAMS on a documentary film on the origins of the ancient Bulgars in present-day Afghanistan and Pakistan (Bactria). He has worked on several film projects as an assistant director, researcher, photographer, editor and producer and director.

He began work on his first films, the documentaries Six Inches and Hollywood Haq in 2005. Hollywood Haq was shot on location in several countries including Afghanistan, Jordan, Greece and Bulgaria, and was selected at San Sebastian in 2007 to be developed as a feature film (European Films crossing borders).

In 2008 following the murder of Bulgarian writer Georgi Stoev, Demir Yanev began another difficult mission with Once Upon a Time in the East. The film was completed in 2010 and was selected at Al Jazeera Film Festival during April, 2011. The film's theatrical premiere in Sofia was in October, 2011. He was also the producer for Life is Black and White a TV film directed by Vlad Petri.

Late in 2012 Demir Yanev completed work on the first feature film script. Throughout the same year New Level Productions re-cut Once upon a time in the East to a 90-minute TV version of the documentary, broadcast on Planete Plus, and continued developing several TV projects including a sitcom adaptation series, a TV drama series and several TV programs.
