= Yanev =

Yanev (Bulgarian: Янев), female form Yaneva (Bulgarian: Янева), is a Bulgarian surname. Notable people with the surname include:

- Aleksandar Yanev (born 1990), Bulgarian basketball player
- Demir Yanev, Syrian-born Bulgarian film director
- Georgi Yanev (born 1998), Bulgarian football player
- Hristo Yanev (born 1979), Bulgarian football manager
- Ivelin Yanev (born 1981), Bulgarian football player
- Kosta Yanev (born 1983), Bulgarian football player
- Krum Yanev (1929–2012), Bulgarian football player
- Stefan Yanev (born 1939), Bulgarian football player
- Stefan Yanev (born 1960), Bulgarian army officer and politician
- Tsvetelina Yaneva (born 1989), Bulgarian pop-folk singer
- Yane Yanev (born 1971), Bulgarian politician
- Yordan Yanev (born 1954), Bulgarian long jumper
