= Thundering Mountains =

1963 film by Žika Mitrović

Thundering Mountains (Nevesinjska puška)
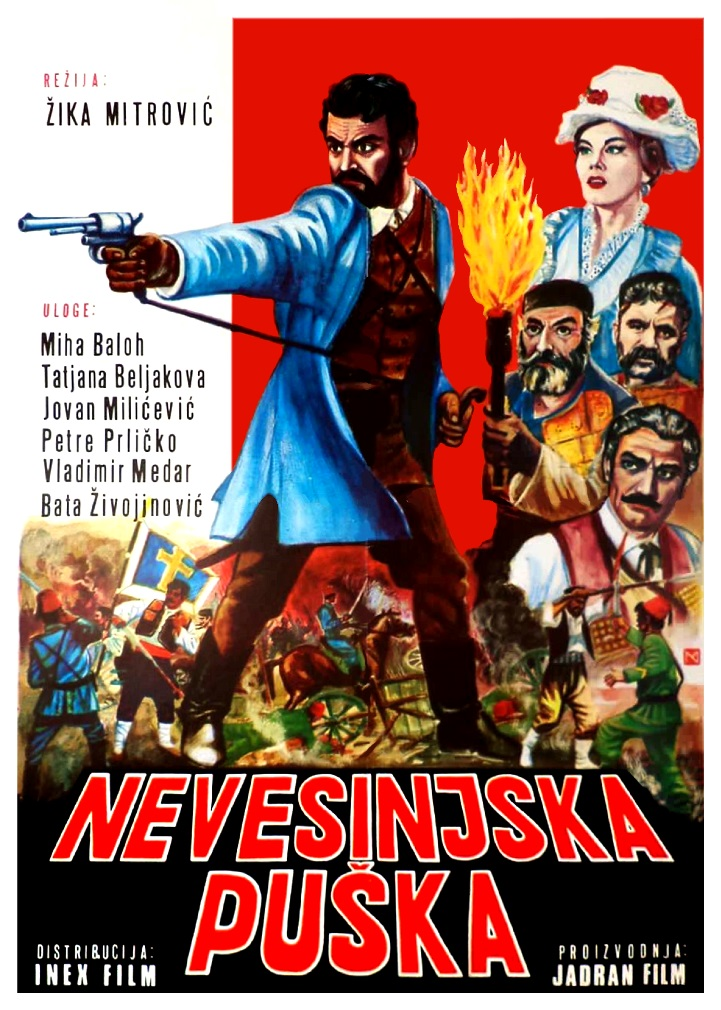
- Release date: 1963
- Country: Yugoslavia
- Language: Serbian

Nevesinjska puška (English title: "Thundering Mountains") is a 1963 Yugoslav film directed by Žika Mitrović and written by Slavko Goldstein and Miomir 'Miki' Stamenkovic. It tells about Herzegovina Uprising (1875–77), which was led by ethnic Serbs against the harsh regime of Ottoman Empire.
