= Arseni Yovkov =

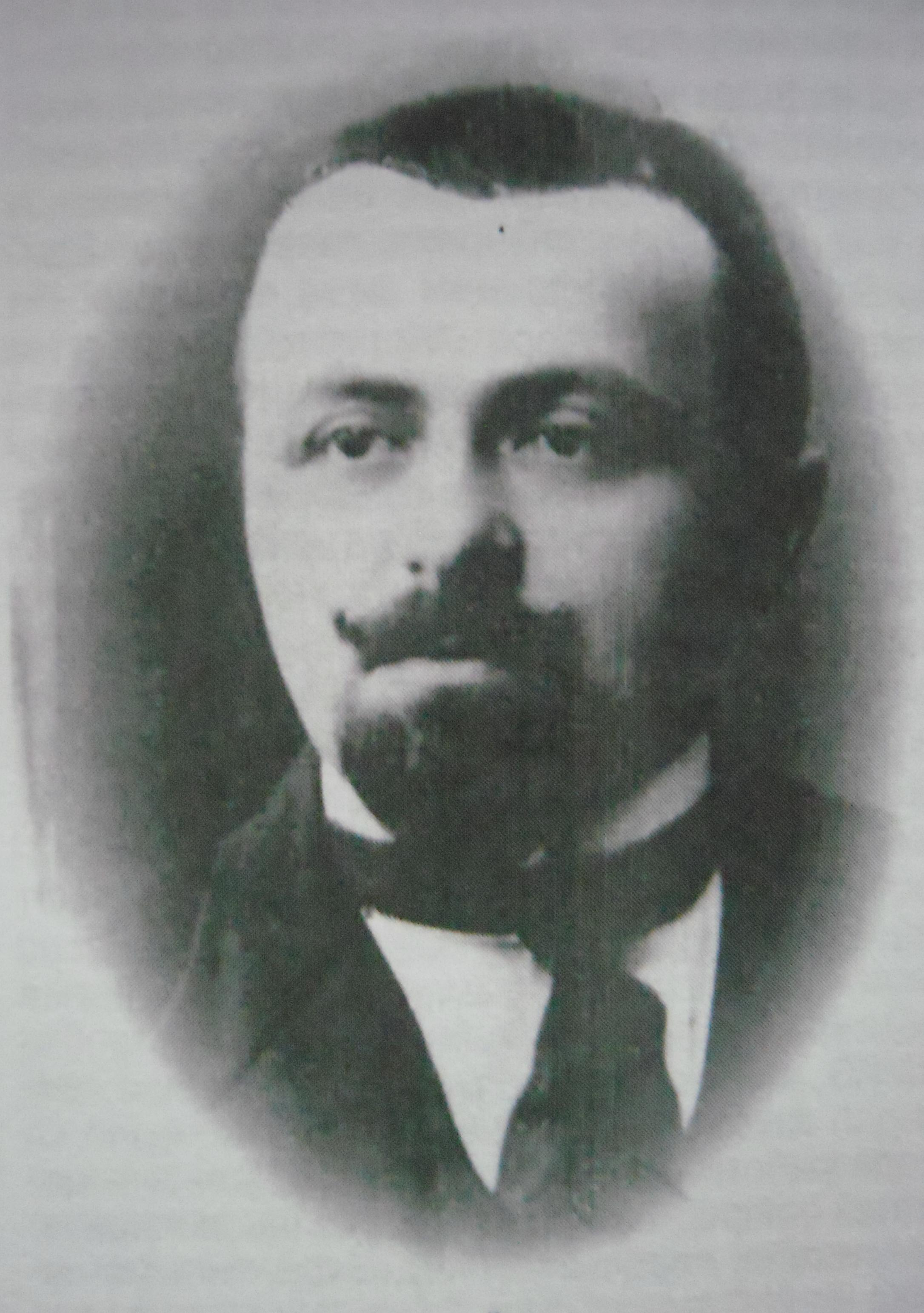
Arseni Yovkov.

Arseni Yovkov (Bulgarian: Арсени Йовков; Macedonian: Арсениј Јовков, romanized: Arsenij Jovkov; 25 March 1882 – 14 September 1924) was a Macedonian Bulgarian revolutionary and poet.

== Life ==
Yovkov was born in Selci in the Ottoman Empire (modern North Macedonia) on 25 March 1882. He studied in a Bulgarian Exarchist school in Bitola. Yovkov participated in the Ilinden uprising. During World War I, he was the mayor of Pristina, which was under Bulgarian occupation. After 1919, he became the leader of the organization Ilinden in Sofia. He was also a Bulgarian poet. During his lifetime, he published two poems. Both him and Georgi Zankov espoused Macedonian political separatism, declaring the Bulgarian state ideal and the independent Macedonia ideal as separate in 1923. In April 1924, Yovkov sent a memorandum to the Bulgarian government, writing that the Macedonians were an "independent political element", who did not want to have anything in common with Bulgaria, while also distinguishing between "Bulgarian state patriotism" and "Macedonian patriotism". However, Yovkov regarded his Macedonian compatriots as "good Bulgarians". In this period, Yovkov was also an editor of the newspapers Ilinden, Pirin and 20 July. In Ilinden's newspaper 20 July on 14 April 1924, Yovkov attempted to discredit the Serbian historical account about Clement of Ohrid, writing that the Macedonian Slavs had the "physiognomy of Bulgarians" since Clement's era. According to Krste Misirkov, Yovkov claimed that the Macedonian question would exist as long as there were Bulgarians in Macedonia. Due to his support for the May Manifesto, he was assassinated on 14 September 1924 in Barakovo, Bulgaria, by members of the rivalling faction of the Internal Macedonian Revolutionary Organization. He was killed as a participant in the conspiracy to assassinate Todor Alexandrov.

At the end of 2018, the Regional Museum of History in Blagoevgrad received a huge amount of archival documents – the so-called "Aleksandar Peltekov" collection. There was also the archive of Arseni Yovkov, which had not been known until then. The Macedonian Academy of Sciences and Arts preserved his archival material. Two books of his, including his verse novel Ilinden, were published in Macedonian in North Macedonia.
