= Voydan Popgeorgiev – Chernodrinski =

Bulgarian writer (1875–1951)

Voydan Popgeorgiev
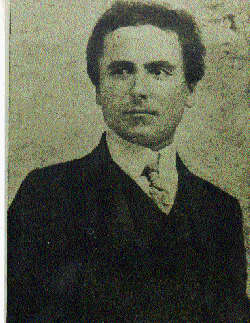
- Chernodrinski in 1891
- Born: Voydan Popgeorgiev Kuzmanov; January 15, 1875; Selci, Ottoman Empire
- Died: January 8, 1951 (aged 75); Sofia, Bulgaria
- Citizenship: Ottoman/Bulgarian
- Occupation: playwright
- Writing career
- Pen name: "Chernodrinski"
- Genre: drama
- Notable work: Macedonian Blood Wedding

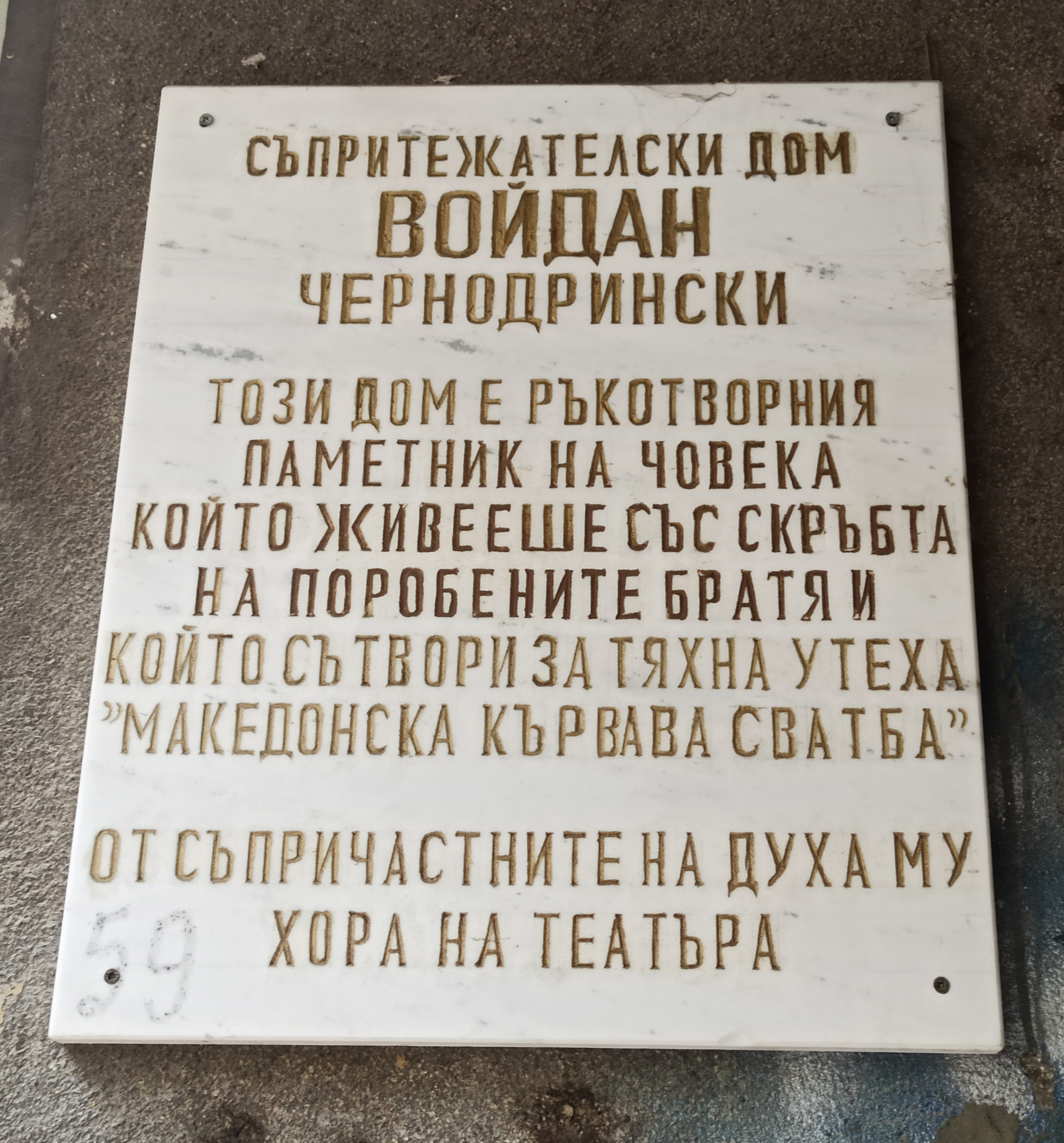
Memorial plaque of Voydan Chernodrinski at his home in Sofia.

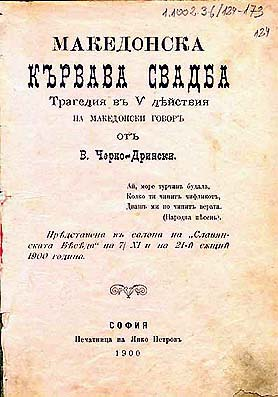
The front page of Macedonian Bloody Wedding (Sofia, 1900)

Voydan Popgeorgiev – Chernodrinski (Bulgarian: Войдан Попгеоргиев - Чернодрински, romanized: Voydan Popgeorgiev - Chernodrinski; Macedonian: Војдан Поп Георгиев - Чернодрински, romanized: Vojdan Pop Georgiev - Černodrinski; January 15, 1875 – January 8, 1951) was a Bulgarian playwright from the region of Macedonia. His pseudonym is derived from the river Black Drin.

== Life ==
Chernodrinski was born in 1875 in the village of Selci, then in the Ottoman Empire. He studied in Ohrid and at Bulgarian Men's High School of Thessaloniki, but moved with his family in 1890 to Bulgaria, where he graduated from the First Male High School in Sofia. There he became a member of the Young Macedonian Literary Association. Later Chernodrinski studied law in Austro-Hungary and Switzerland, but failed to graduate and moved back to Ottoman Macedonia, where he worked as a Bulgarian teacher.

Afterwards he returned to Bulgaria and became a head of the traveling troupe "Grief and comfort" (Bulgarian: Скръб и утеха), founded in 1901 and renamed in 1902 as "Macedonian Capital Theater" (Bulgarian: Столичен македонски театър). In Sofia, he wrote the most famous of his works, the play Macedonian Bloody Wedding. Chernodrinski reworked it later to give the plot and the libretto for the famous opera "Tsveta" by maestro Georgi Atanasov.

After the Young Turk Revolution in 1908 Chernodrinski moved with his traveling troupe back to Ottoman Macedonia. He was invited there by the Bulgarian Constitutional Clubs with the support of Peyo Yavorov and assisted by the Bulgarian National Theater. During the Balkan Wars, he was mobilized into the Bulgarian Army.

During World War I, he served as a Bulgarian officer and created the "Soldier Songs" cycle. After the war, he continued with his theatrical activities in Bulgaria. Towards the end of 1922, he formed a new drama theater under the name "Ilinden". In the mid-1930s, Aleksandar Shoumenoff, the owner of the First Bulgarian Book Store in Granite City, published part of the Chernodrinski's works. The text was not translated into English but his works and plays became popular among Macedono-Bulgarian emigration. At this time Chernodrinski sympathized with IMRO leader Ivan Mihaylov. During World War II and the subsequent Bulgarian occupation of Vardar Macedonia, Chernodrinski and his troupe organized performances there. After WWII and the coming of the communists to power, he completely ceased his activities. He died in Sofia in 1951.

== Legacy ==
After the death of Chernodrinski, in the newly found SR Macedonia, he was proclaimed as a Macedonian writer, who had laid the foundations of the modern Macedonian theater. His play Macedonian Bloody Wedding was translated into the newly codified Macedonian language. His son publicly made a request to publishing houses in Skopje to publish his plays in their original version, without removing the Bulgarian self-identification of the protagonists. He is considered an ethnic Macedonian writer in North Macedonia and a figure who laid the foundations of the Macedonian theater and the dramatic arts.

A commemorative plaque was set on his home in Sofia.

== Works ==
Besides the Macedonian Bloody Wedding written primarily in the Debar dialect, Chernodrinski published several other literary works, all in standard Bulgarian, including:

- The woodcutters (Дърварите) (1895)
- In the barroom (В механата) (1895)
- Macedonian emigration (Македонска емиграция) (1897)
- Of the head we suffer (От главата си патиме) (1902)
- The slave and the agha (Робът и агата) (1902)
- Evil for evil (Зло за зло) (1903)
- Skilled workers (Майстори) (1903)
- The spirit of the freedom (Духът на свободата) (1909)
- On the river (На реката) (1921)
- On New Year (На Нова година) (1921)
- Tzar Pir (Царъ Пиръ) (1921)
- The storms near Vardar (Бурите на Вардар) (1925)
- Tsveta the duchess (Цвета войводката) (1929)
- Slav Dragota (Слав Драгота) (1930)
