= Petre Prličko =

Macedonian actor (1907–1995)

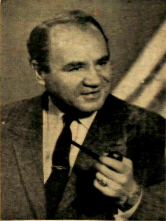
- Petre Prličko as "Erotis" in the play "Suspicious Character" at Kumanovo Theater in 1962
- Born: March 13, 1907; Veles, Ottoman Empire (present Republic of North Macedonia)
- Died: November 16, 1995 (aged 88); Skopje, Republic of Macedonia
- Occupation: actor
- Known for: the roles in: Frosina; Miss Stone; Volca nok (Wolf's Night); Denovi na iskusenie (Days of temptation); Republikata vo plamen (The Republic in flame)
- Children: Anče Dzambazova
- Father: Dime Parličkov
- Relatives: Igor Džambazov (grandson); Tatjana Džambazova (granddaughter)

Petre Prličko (Macedonian: Петре Прличко; 13 March 1907 – 16 November 1995) was a Macedonian actor. According to the periodical Razgledi, he was a "legend of Macedonian theater".

== Biography ==
Petre Prličko was born on 13 March 1907 in Veles. He began his career with travelling theaters, becoming part of one in 1923. In 1931, he ended up forming his own travelling theater called "Bohemian" (initially called Blue Bird), which was in existence until 1939. In the same year he entered the National Theater in Skopje. During WW2, he became an actor in Skopje's National Theater, which was formed by the Bulgarian authorities, while Vardar Macedonia was under the Kingdom of Bulgaria. Then he joined the partisan's theater called "Kočo Racin" in 1944, which later became the Macedonian National Theater.

He made his film debut in Frosina.

For his role as "Mandana" in the film Miss Stone, he received the Golden Arena award for Best Actor.

While he was a native of Veles, he died in Skopje in 1995.

== Selected filmography ==
- Frosina (1952)
- Miss Stone (1958)
- Macedonian Blood Wedding (1967)

== Gallery ==
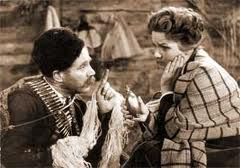
Petre Prličko in the role of "Mandana" in the film Miss Stone

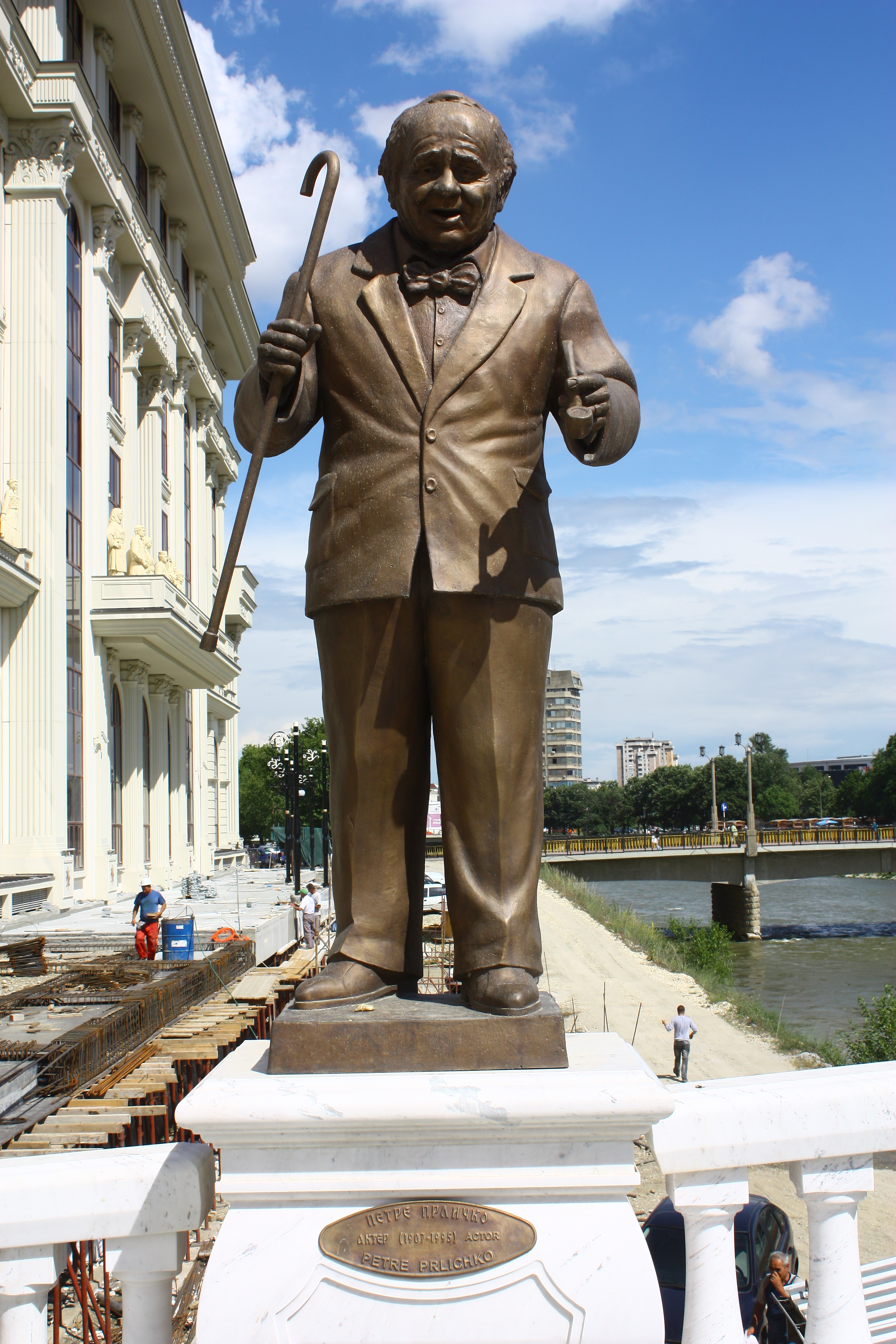
Statue of Petre Prličko on the Art Bridge in Skopje

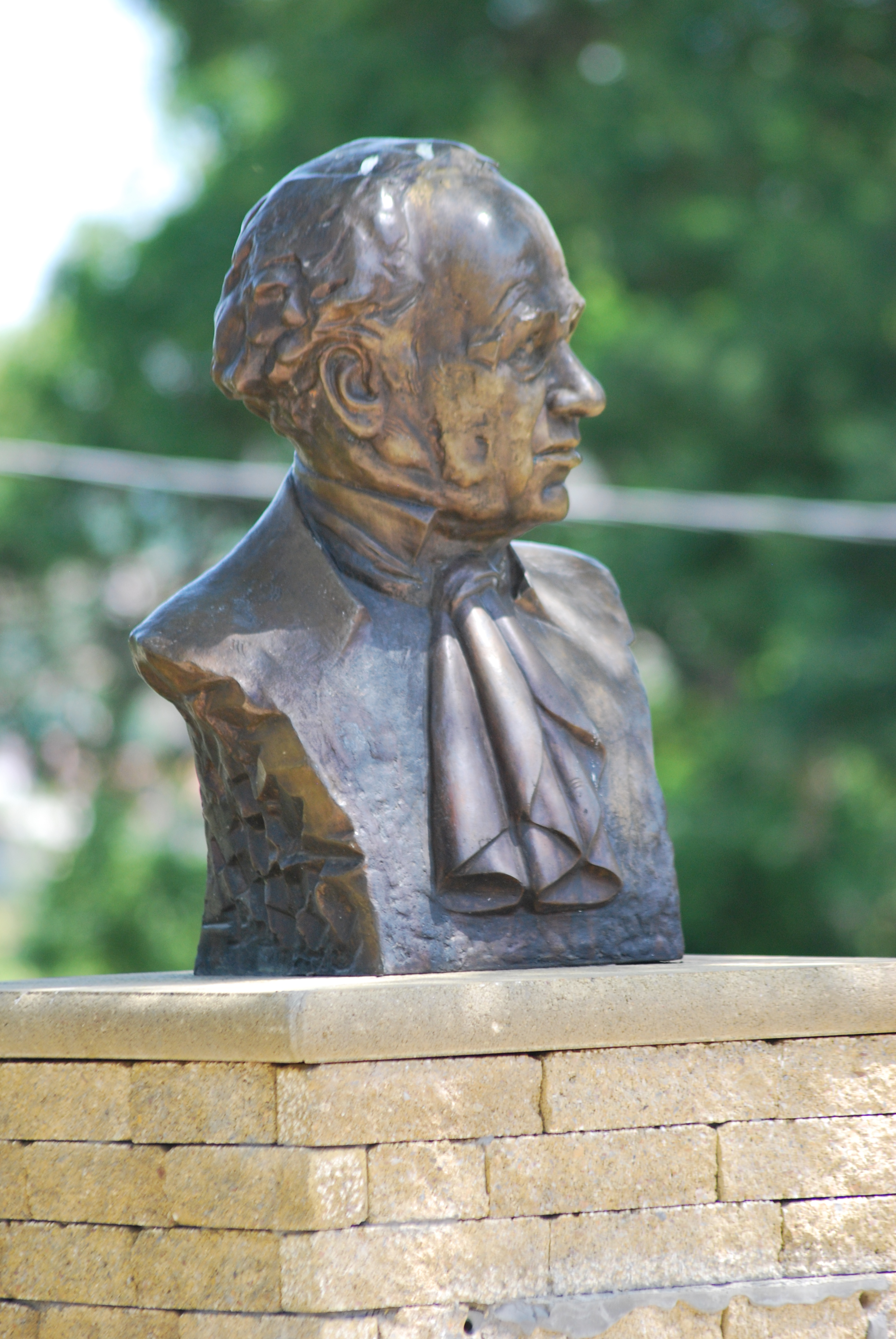
Statue of Petre Prličko in Veles
