= Milutin Mićović =

Biography of Milutin Mićović, Serbian and Montenegrin writer

Milutin Mićović (writer)
- Born: June 12, 1953 (age 73); Velimlje, Niksic, FNR Jugoslavija
- Occupation: Writer
- Notable work: The Lights in the Darkness of Montenegro
- Awards: Miroslav's Gospel, Miodrag Ćupić, Seal of Herceg Šćepan, Marko Miljanov

Milutin Mićović, is a Serbian writer, born in Velimlje, near Nikšić on June 12, 1953. He is the president of the Writers' Society «Njegoš», founded in 2004, and the editor of the traditional cultural manifestation «Days of Njegoš». He is a member of Association of Writers of Montenegro and Serbian Literary Guild. In 2021, he was awarded the Montenegrin state award, Miroslav's Gospel, for the book The Lights in the Darkness of Montenegro. He lives in Nikšić, Montenegro.

== Biography ==
Milutin Mićović finished high school in Nikšić, studied economics and philosophy in Podgorica and Belgrade. His work was translated in different foreign languages such as Russian, Armenian and Romanian.

Milutin Mićović is represented in several anthologies of contemporary Serbian, montenegrin and Slavic poetry, such as From Century to Century by Sergej Glavjuk (Moscow, 2003) and The World poetry, in the selection of the Armenian poet Gagik Daftyan (Yerevan, 2016).

He wrote forewords for the bilingual edition of two works of Njegoš, The Ray of the Microcosm (first translation in Russian, Ilya Chislov) and The Notebook (first translation in Russian by Ljudmila Burtseva), as well as for Collected Works of King Nikola (published by Svetigora and Oktoich, 2009). He was the columnist in the Dan (Podgorica) from 2007 to 2021, publishing over 800 short essays on current social, cultural and political topics. He was an editor at the publishing house "Oktoih" in Podgorica from 1993 to 2003, member of the editorial board of "The Writers Newspaper" (Knjizevne Novine), Belgrade from 2012 to 2019 and Vice-president of the Association of Writers of Montenegro from 2011 to 2016.

Milutin Micovic is the brother of Joanikije II Metropolitan of Montenegro.

== Prizes and awards ==
- Marko Miljanov, 1992 for the novel Ruined Town
- Award of the Njegoš Library from Peć, 1996 for the book Thus Spoke the Montenegrins
- Medal V. V. Bolotova, Russia, 2010
- Recognition of the Union of Writers of Russia, 2014
- Portile Poeziei International Prize, Romania, 2018
- Miodrag Ćupić, 2018 for the poetry book Day Night
- Order for asceticism in culture, Union of Writers of Russia, 2021
- Seal of Herceg Šćepan, Herceg Novi, 2021
- Miroslav's Gospel, state award, 2022 for the book Lights in the Darkness of Montenegro

== Works ==
=== Poetry collections ===
- Living Water (University Word, Nikšić, 1987)
- The Doors (two books - House and Bread for Travelers, Podgorica, October, 1994)
- Traces of the Future (Following the Future), in Serbian and Russian, translated by Andrej Bazilevski, (Tver 2010)
- Day and Night (Poetry Selection, Institute for Serbian Culture, Nikšić, 2018)

=== Novel ===
- Ruined town (Podgorica, October, 1991)

=== Essays ===
- That's what Montenegrins used to say (Andrijevica, Stupovi, 1996)
- Letters from Ouranopolis (Novi Sad, Svetovi, 2000)
- The Serbian Labyrinth and the Montenegrin Minotaur (Belgrade, Serbian Literary Guild, 2003)
- Njegoš and contemporary Montenegro (Podgorica, Association of Writers of Montenegro, 2006)
- Njegoševa Luča (Serbian Studies, University of Banja Luka, 2021)
- The Lights in the Darkness of Montenegro ( Serbian Literary Guild, Belgrade, 2021)
