= Miss Stone (film) =

1958 film by Žika Mitrović

- Theatrical release poster
- Directed by: Živorad Mitrović
- Screenplay by: Gorgi Abadziev, Trajče Popov
- Based on: real historical event
- Produced by: Vardar Film Skopje
- Starring: Nikola Avtovski, Darko Damevski, Dragi Kostovski, Vladimir Medar, Ilija Milčin, Todor Nikolovski, Dragan Ocokoljić, Petre Prličko, Dragi Krstevski - Amfi, Olga Spiridonović
- Edited by: Vojislav Bjenjaš
- Music by: Ivan Rupnik
- Production company: Vardar Film
- Release date: 1958
- Running time: 97 minutes
- Country: Yugoslavia
- Language: Macedonian

Miss Stone (Macedonian: Мис Стоун) is a 1958 Yugoslav historical film, directed by Živorad Mitrović. It tells the story about the Miss Stone Affair.

== Synopsis ==
The film is set in 1901, and is based on events surrounding the growing Macedonian resistance to the Ottoman Empire. Resistance groups known as "Komiti" show the readiness of the Macedonian people to fight for freedom. At the same time different religious missions are trying to expand their influence among the people. Thessaloniki is the center of the American Protestant mission in Macedonia. The Internal Macedonian Revolutionary Organization abducted U.S. Protestant missionary Miss Stone (Olga Spiridonović) led by Jane Sandanski (Ilija Milčin) and his unit. The group demanded 25 pounds of gold to release her. They wanted her to sign the demand. She flatly refuses, but after going through several battles with Turkish forces, she stands on the side of guerrillas and signs the letter. The gold is eventually provided.
