= Zlatno Slavejče =

Zlatno Slavejče (Macedonian: Златно славејче; English: Golden Nightingale) is the oldest music show for children in North Macedonia. The show was established in 1971, and many children who have performed there have gone on to become renowned recording artists.
