= Stapar =

Stapar Стапар (Serbian)
- Village (Selo)
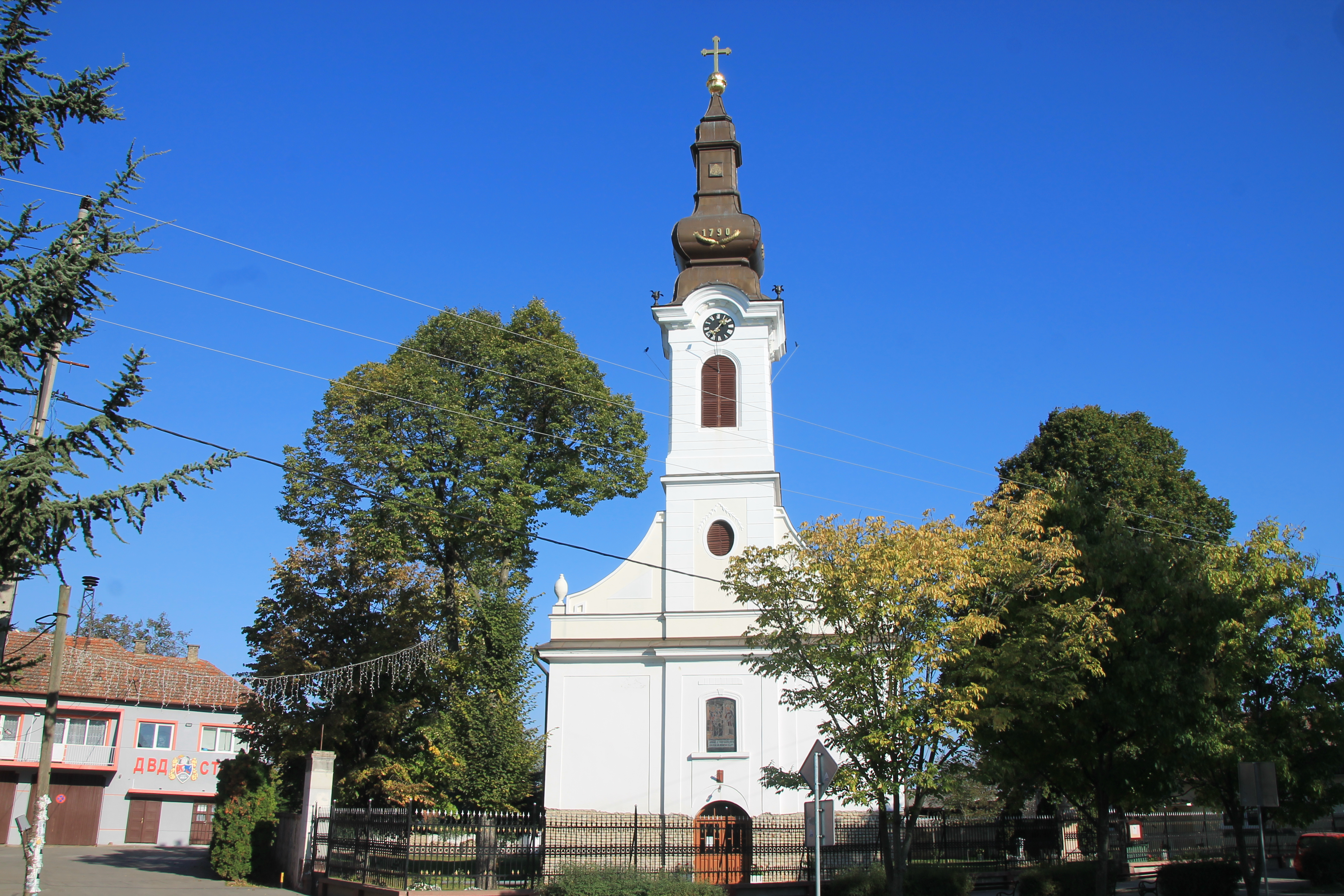
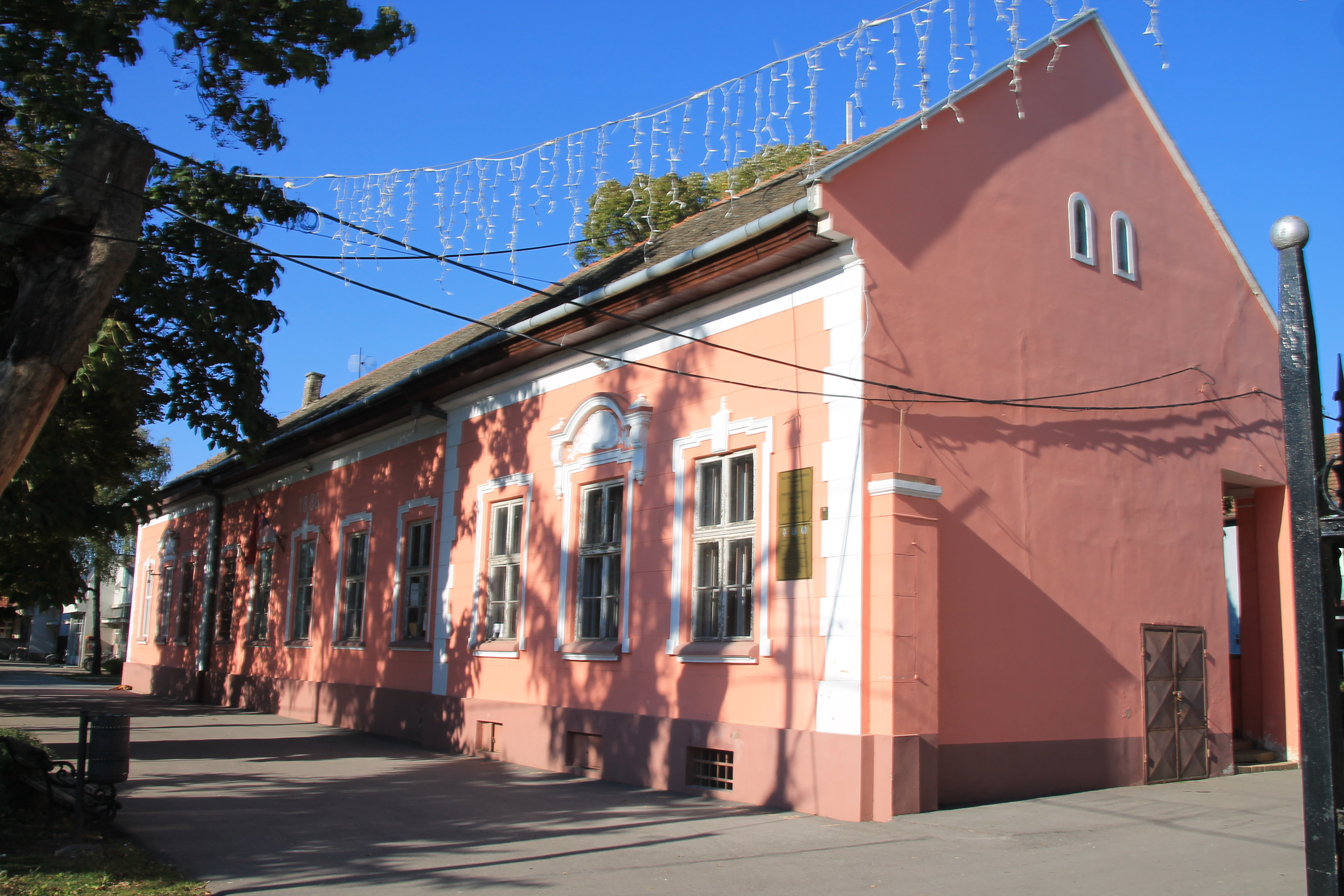
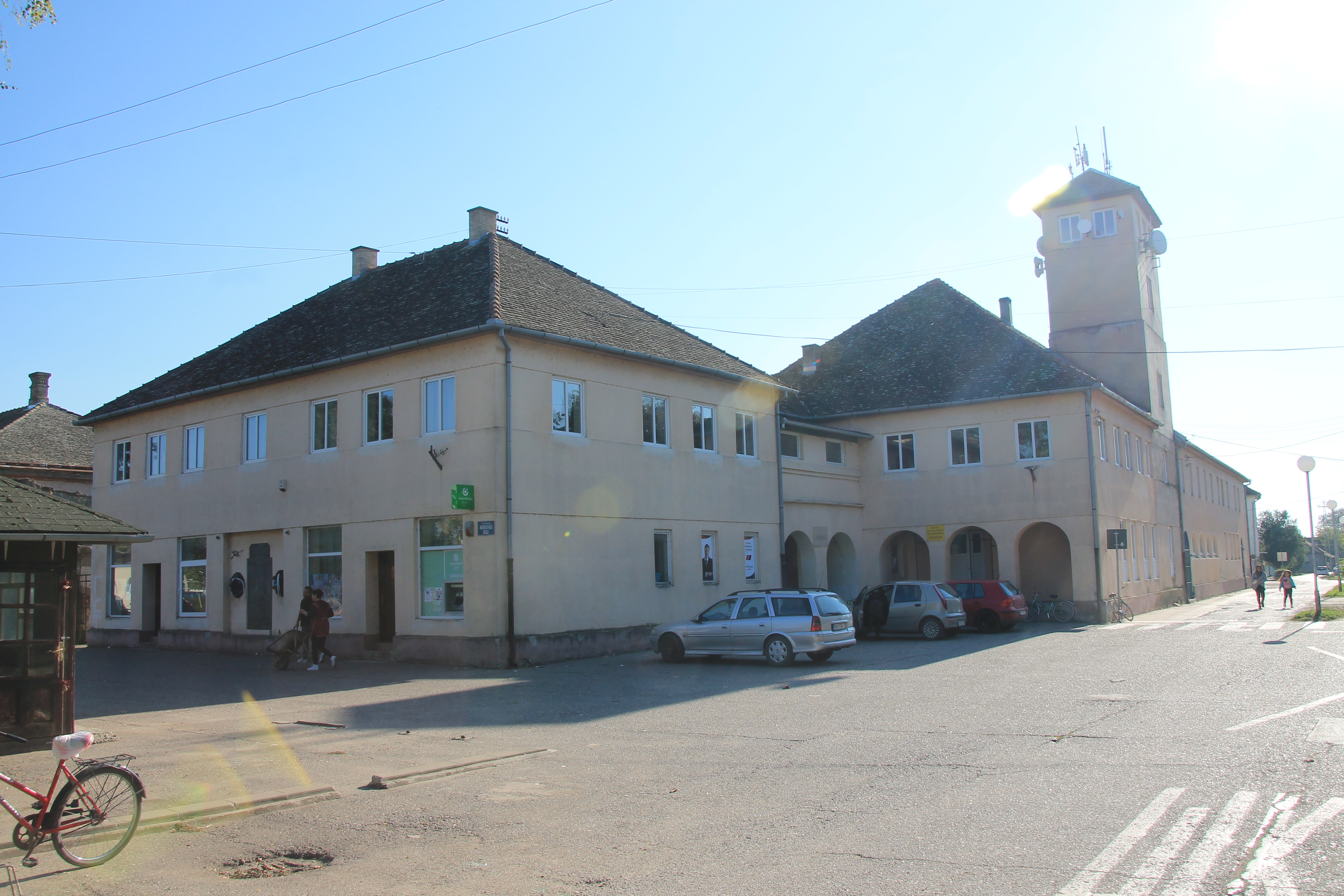
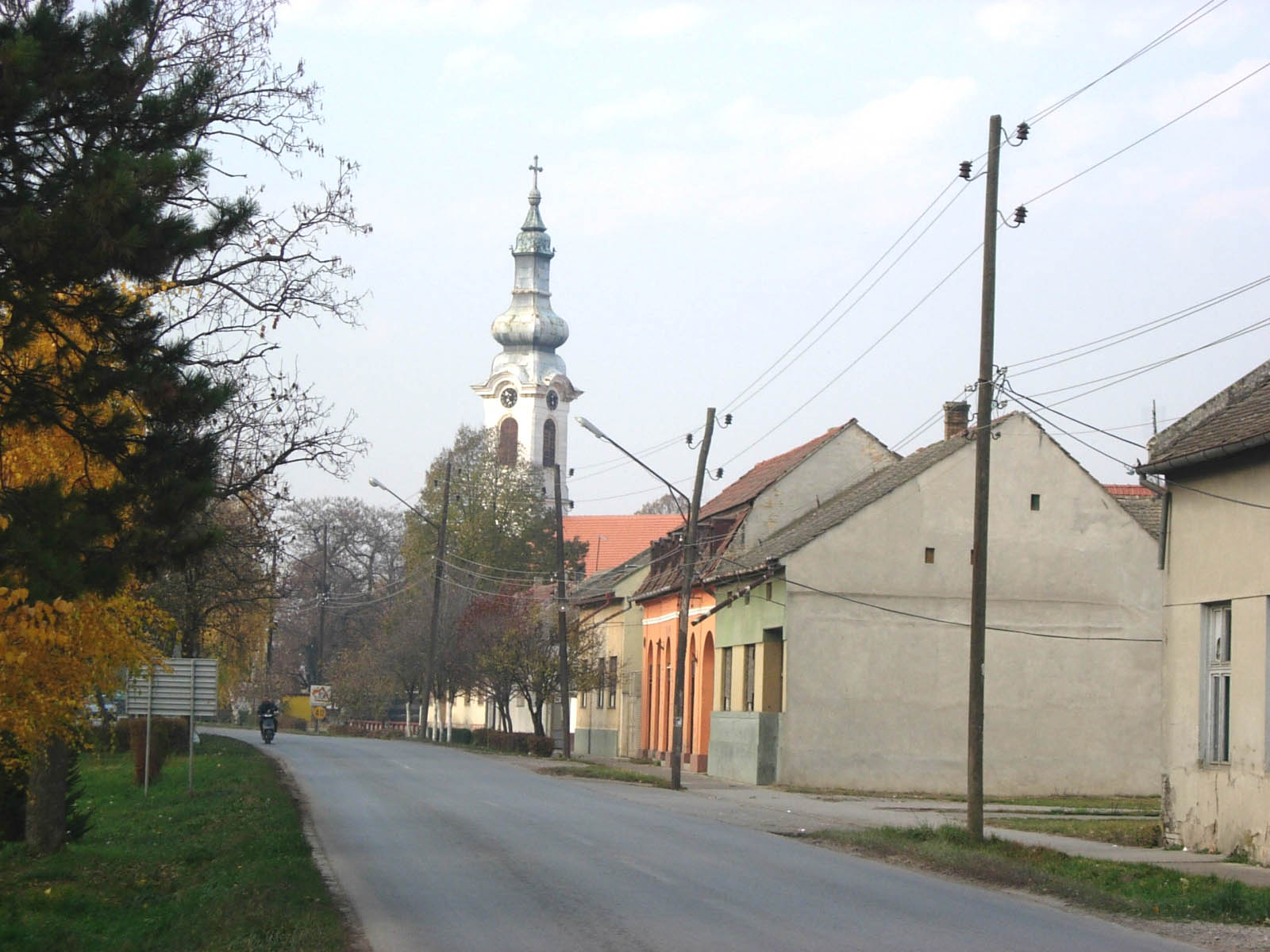
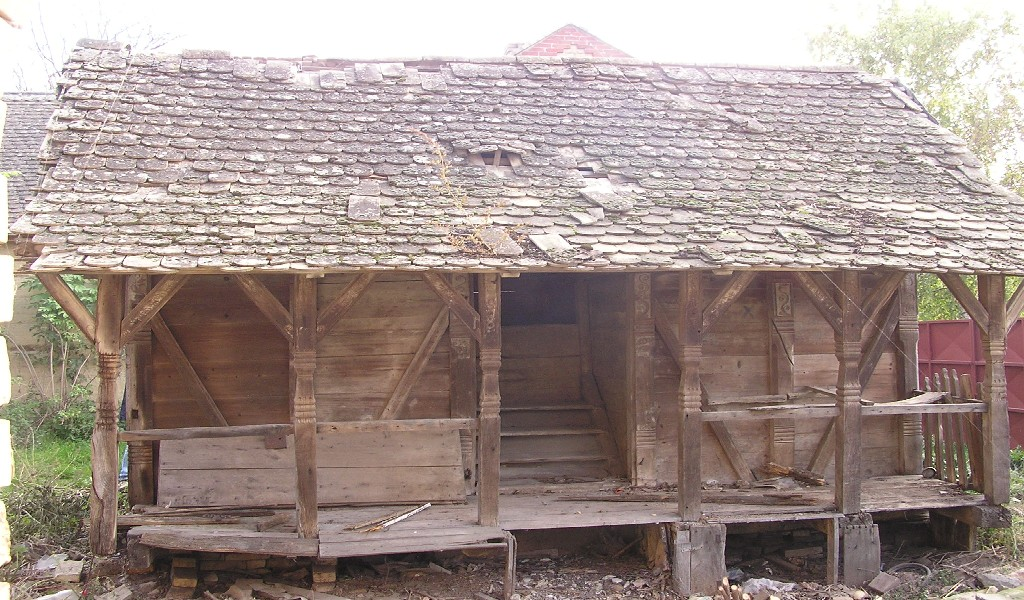
- Serbian Orthodox Church Town Hall Administrative and commercial building Main Street Old ambar

- Location within Vojvodina Location within Serbia Location within Europe
- Coordinates: 45°39′41″N 19°12′18″E
- Country: Serbia
- Province: Vojvodina
- Region: Bačka
- District: West Bačka
- Municipality: Sombor
- Established: 1752

Population (2002)
  - Total: 3,720
- Time zone: UTC+1 (CET)
  - Summer (DST): UTC+2 (CEST)

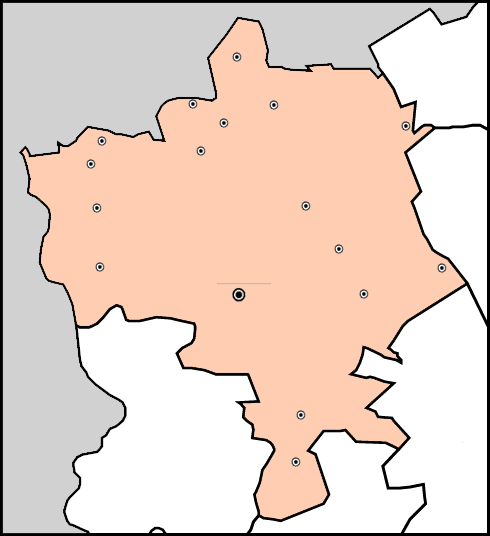

Stapar (Serbian Cyrillic: Стапар) is a village in Serbia. It is situated in the Sombor municipality, in the West Bačka District, Vojvodina province. The village has a Serb ethnic majority and its population numbering 3,720 people (2002 census).

== History ==
First large colonization of Germans into Bačka started in 1748. Inhabitants of the villages of Bokčenovići (or Bokčenovac) and Vranješevo, which were located near the town of Apatin, opposed the colonization plans of the Austrian government so they organized themselves under the leadership of Tanasko Lazić, a participant in the War of the Austrian Succession. They began attacking the ships on the Danube, especially Hungarian ones which were transporting German settlers. Called the "Pirates of the Danube", the villagers were ransacking and looting the ships and settlers on such a scale, that it was noted how "not one ship could sail down the Danube and not to be attacked". After several incidents ended with the killing of the attacked colonists, the imperial court in Vienna decided to put an end on piracy.

Following the order of Austrian empress Maria Theresa, they were evicted from their settlements and originally resettled in the puszta of Prigrevica-Sentivan. In 1752 they were settled on the location of modern Stapar. In time, their original villages, Bokčenovići and Vranješevo, ceased to exist. The population was resettled only by the third order. Due to his war reputation, Lazić gained the audience of the Empress twice and was successful in appealing orders. After pressure from the Hungarians, whose shipping on the Danube was suffering economic losses due to these attacks and their plans for establishment of Apatin as a port on the Danube with a predominantly German population, no further appeals were granted. Eleven years later, 73 families from Prigrevica settled in Stapar as well.

== Name ==
Local myth states that the original name of the village was Stopar, because there were hundred couples of families (Serbian sto pari), which originally settled in the village.

== Historical population ==
- 1961: 4,582
- 1971: 4,242
- 1981: 3,988
- 1991: 3,795

== Characteristics ==
The village has a Serbian Orthodox church dedicated to the Presentation of the Blessed Virgin Mary. Its iconostasis was painted by Jakov Orfelin in the late 18th century. The church was declared a cultural monument and placed under the state protection.

== Economy ==
Stapar is known for its weaving craft colony which makes famous rugs, or kilims. The colony is regularly visited by the ambassadors and foreign dignitaries. The Government of the Republic of Serbia, the Government of Vojvodina and the National Assembly of Serbia included Stapar kilims into their gift list protocols, as they are considered the "most autochthonous kilims of the northern Serbia". One was given to the Charles, Prince of Wales. There is a permanent exhibition of rugs with the oldest exhibits being over a century old. The colony organized an "Ethno-net" which gathers female weavers from all over the rural areas of Serbia, which are then perfecting their skills in weaving, embroidery, goldwork, etc.

The rug making originated in the 18th century. The Stapar kilims in the late 19th and early 20th century were transported and sold throughout Austro-Hungary, including Vienna and Budapest. They are woven in basic white or beige, occasionally in green color. The rugs were a required part of the dowry. They were mostly used as bed covers and showed the status and wealth of the family. The rug weaving originated and developed as the home craft and in the 19th century grew into the most representative section of the textile craft and home industry in Vojvodina.

Unlike the more famous Pirot carpet from south Serbia, the domineering motifs on the Stapar carpets (Staparac) are roses, they are vowed on the horizontal loom and have no fringes. They are made from the mix of wool and hemp. In the late 20th century, the craft started to die out, but was rejuvenated in 2014.

== See also ==
- List of places in Serbia
- List of cities, towns and villages in Vojvodina

== Sources ==
- Slobodan Ćurčić, Broj stanovnika Vojvodine, Novi Sad, 1996.
- Branislav Ćurčić, Stapar i njegova istorija, Sombor 1913.
