= Branko Milićević =

Serbian actor

- Бранко Милићевић
- Born: Branislav Milićević; 3 April 1946; Zemun, Belgrade, PR Serbia, FPR Yugoslavia
- Other name: Branko Kockica
- Occupations: Actor and singer
- Years active: 1968-present
- Notable work: Kocka, Kocka, Kockica

Branislav "Branko" Milićević (Serbian Cyrillic: Бранислав "Бранко" Милићевић, born 3 April 1946), also known by his stage name Branko Kockica (Branko the Little Cube), is a Serbian (Yugoslavian) actor known for his roles in children's TV shows.

== Life ==
Born on 3 April 1946 in Zemun, at the time in Yugoslavia, he has been acting since childhood. He later became famous for his work on a television series for children titled Kocka, kocka, kockica (Cube, Cube, Cubelet), which was on the air for several decades on TV Belgrade.

Branko plays several instruments, and he also recorded several albums of children's songs.

=== Cube, Cube, Cubelet ===
In 1974, on Belgrade TV (Channel 1), Branko started the children's TV series Kocka, kocka, kockica (Cube, Cube, Cubelet). Over the next twenty years, 250 episodes were shown, terminating in 1994. In 2003, several new episodes were released in order to try to revive the show, but it never reached the popularity of the original series.

In 1979, the series won a reward on the 12th International Educational Program in Japan for its episode "Run, Run, Little Drops". The episode first aired on April 26, 1978, and was co-written by Ibrahim Hadžić, Branko Miličević and Biserka Pejović.

=== Puž theater ===
In 1977, he and his wife Slobodanka (Caca) Aleksić founded the "Puž" theater (Puž means "snail" in Serbian), which today is an important children's theater in Serbia. "The Snail" has spawned numerous plays for children and adults, as well as a plethora of young actors who began their careers on its stages.
