= Igor Džambazov =

Macedonian musician and actor

- Игор Џамбазов
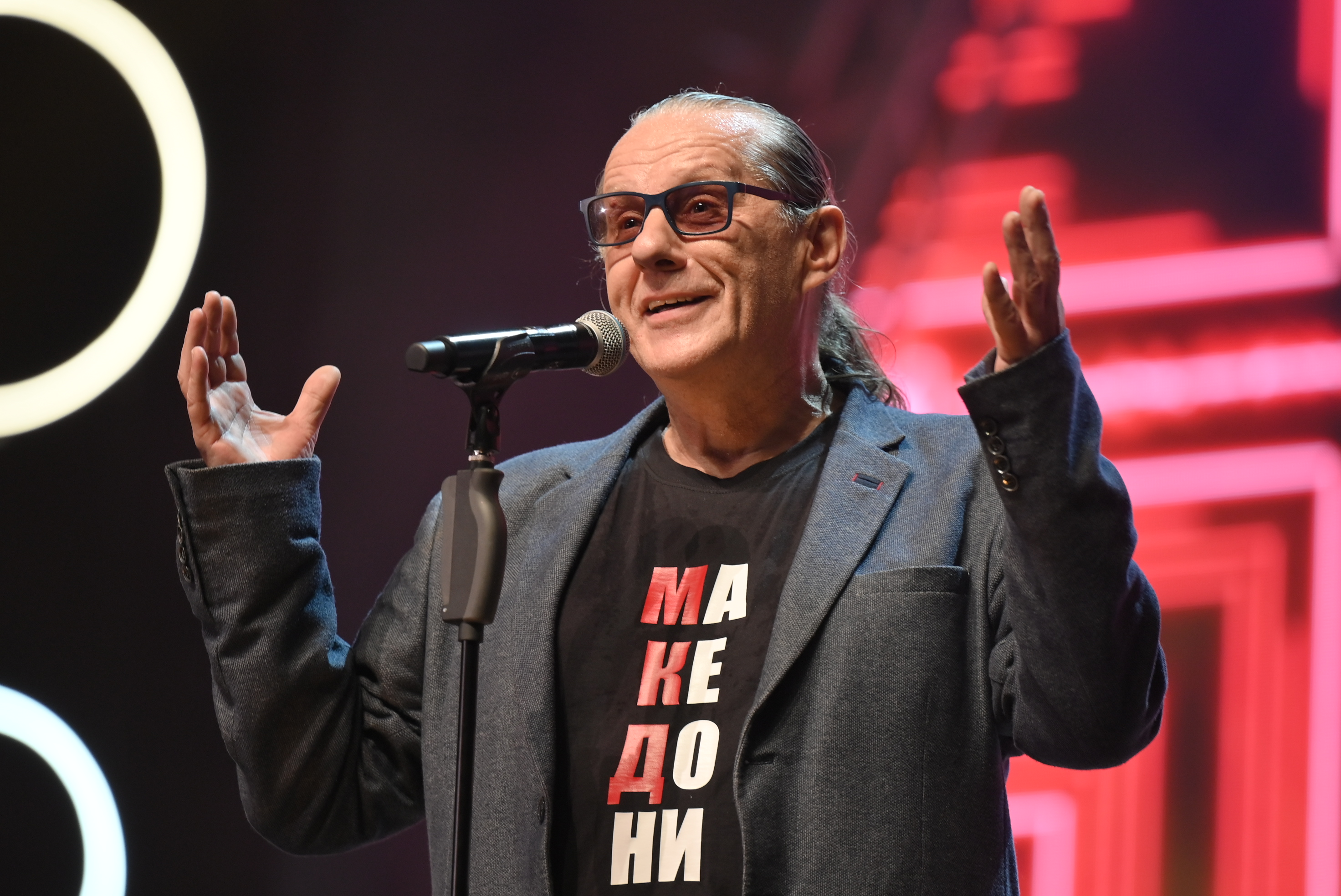
- Džambazov in 2024
- Born: 15 July 1963 (age 63); Skopje, SR Macedonia, SFR Yugoslavia
- Occupations: Actor; TV presenter Writer; Songwriter; Singer; Director
- Years active: 1971–present
- Parents: Aleksandar Džambazov (father); Anče Džambazova (mother)
- Relatives: Petre Prličko (grandfather); Tatjana Džambazova (sister)

Igor Džambazov (Macedonian: Игор Џамбазов, pronounced [iˈɡɔr dʒambaˈzɔf]; born 15 July 1963) is a Macedonian actor, showman, TV presenter, comedian, singer, songwriter, and prosaist. He was born on July 15, 1963, in Skopje to composer Aleksandar Džambazov and actress Anče Džambazova. His grandfather was the renowned Macedonian actor Petre Prličko.

== Film career ==
His acting career began at the young age of 12 with the film Makedonskiot del od pekolot ('Macedonian Part of Hell'), however his first major role was in the TV Series based on the book Volšebnoto samarče by Vančo Nikoleski. He was the lead actor in the film, and acted alongside the legendary Macedonian actor Risto Šiškov.

=== Filmography ===
- Наша Мала Клиника, 2010–2011
- Боли ли? Прва Балкан Догма (Does it hurt? First Balkan Dogma) 2007
- Ноќта спроти Свети Василиј, 2002
- Збогум на 20-тиот век, ('Goodbye, 20th Century!') 1998
- Welcome to Sarajevo 1997
- Македонија може, ('Macedonia Can') 1991
- Викенд на мртовци, 1988
- Девојките на Марко, (Marko's Girlfriends) 1987
- Училиште за кловнови, (Clown School) 1987
- Сонце на дланка, 1986
- Климент Охридски, ('Clement of Ohrid') 1986
- Волшебното самарче,(The enchanted horse saddle) 1975
- Македонскиот дел од пеколот, ('Macedonian Part of Hell') 1971

== Musical career ==
Igor Džambazov was born in Skopje in a family of actors and musicians. His grandfather Petre Prličko was a celebrated actor, his father Aleksandar Džambazov is a conductor and composer and his mother Anče Džambazova was an actress. In his autobiography Toa sum jas (That's Me), he states that the first music he had ever heard was his father's schlagers and at first he thought that it was the only music in the world, but later he figured out the con and started listening to something modern.

He formed his first music group Pop at only 12 years in 1975 and was actively engaged playing in the garages and bomb shelters around Skopje. Fifteen years later, he becomes member of Havana. Igor with the other two members of the band, Zeko and Pižerecorded three songs: "Daj mi, žiti se..." (Give Me, Please), "Nema spas" (No Relief) and "Štok mi bejbi" (Stock Me Baby) in only few months of the existence of their band. The songs were recorded in the studio of Toše Pop Simonov. Havana band had one of their most notable appearance on 8 September 1991, the day when Macedonia gained its independence from Yugoslavia. Then the band fell under bankruptcy.

In the years that followed he participated in several national musical festivals, for which Igor acknowledges, is his biggest mistake in the field of music. From the national festival MakFest 1991, the song "Ljubov zapej mi" (Love, Sing to Me), which Igor recorded with sisters Tanya and Lydia Kocovski and John Ilija Apelgrin, became the most performed song between two festivals in Macedonia. In 1992 he recorded two of his hits "Čija si" (Whose Are You) and "Grev ili špricer" (Sin Or Spritzer), and again participated in MakFest 1992 in which he performed the song "Vreme za plačenje" (Time for Crying) and received the second prize from the audience. Also, he won the sixth place on InterFest, a music festival in Bitola in 1994 and in the same year published his first solo album called Greatest Hits. It was recorded in studio ROSS on tape and was produced by Robert Sazdov with the program and arrangement made by Darko Mijalkovski. The complete author of the songs is Igor Džambazov, except for one which was inspired by the song "Dancing in the Street" by Mick Jagger and David Bowie.

His latest album is honoring and depicting the 30-year musical collaboration with Igor Atanasovski – Hare. The album name is “Prvite trieset” (“ The first thirty”), and includes a mix of styles and genres. There are some jazz covers of Macedonian Folk songs (such as “Jacquiline”), original songs (“Overdose of blues”), or well-known songs that never got a studio recording such as “Dishi Dlaboko” (“Take a deep breath”).

== Bibliography ==
- Igor Džambazov – Гол човек ('Naked Man') ISBN 9989-2465-0-5
- Igor Džambazov – Тоа сум јас ('That's me')
- Igor Džambazov – Прирачник за анти – антиалкохоличари ('Manual for anti – anti alcoholics')
- Igor Džambazov – Приказни од Мјаукедонија ('Stories from Meowcedonia')
- Igor Džambazov – Облечен човек ('Clothed Man')
- Igor Džambazov – Улица Диши Длабоко ('Street Breath Deeply')
