= Georgi Stoev =

Bulgarian writer and mobster (1973–2008)

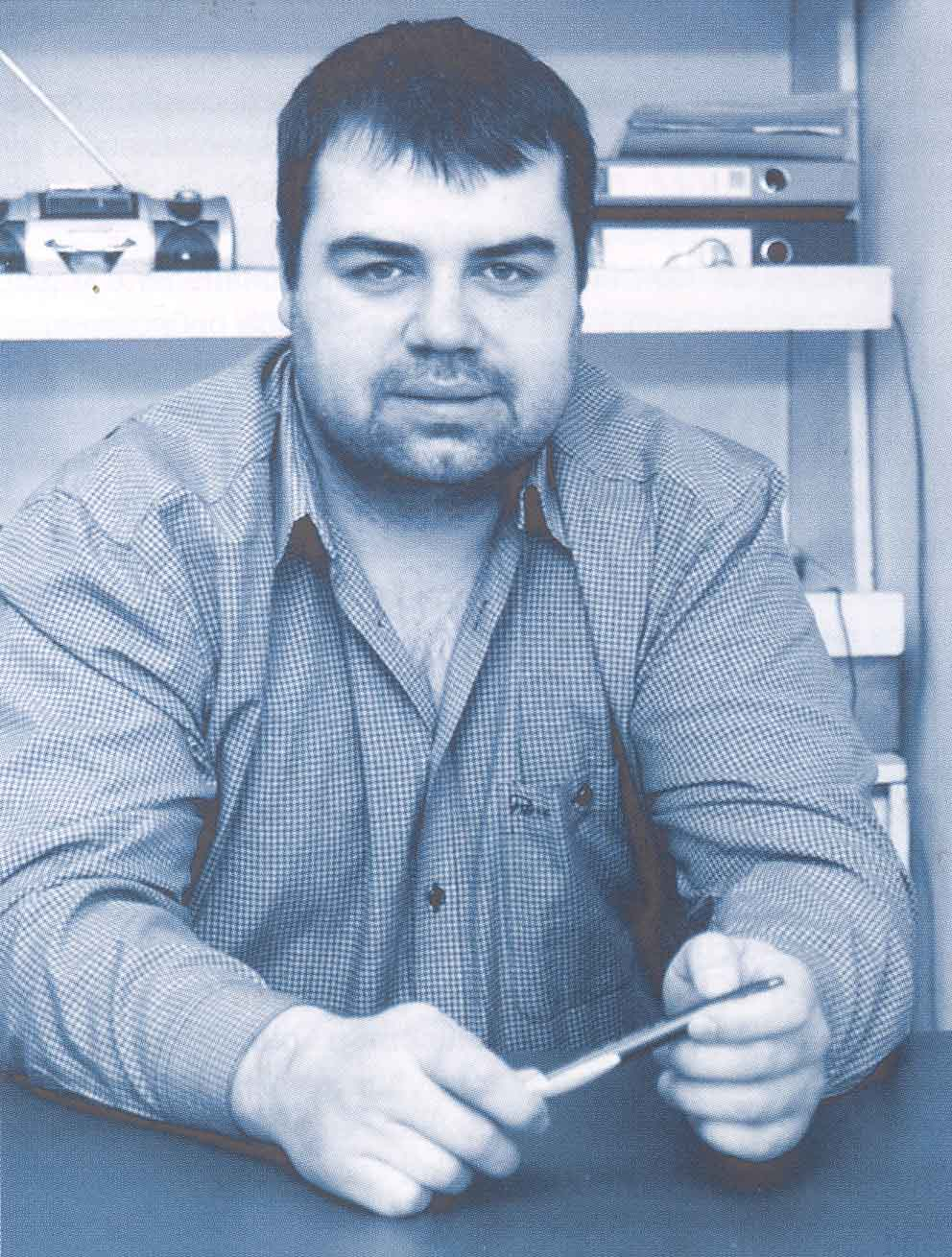
G Stoev

Georgi Stoev (Bulgarian: Георги Стоев; September 26, 1973 – April 7, 2008, Sofia) was a Bulgarian writer and former Bulgarian mafia mobster.

== Biography ==
As a teenager he trained to be a wrestler and attended "Olympic Hopes" school in Sofia. With the collapse of one-party rule in 1989 the school was closed and the wrestlers formed a mafia which terrorized Bulgaria in the 1990s. Sometime later, Stoev turned away from crime and repented and turned to writing.

In his books, which totalled nine by his death, he revealed the secrets to some of the country's most notorious crimes based on his own experiences. He exposed alleged mafia gang members in his books, making no attempt to disguise their identities.

He was murdered by what is believed to be the mafia hit on April 7, 2008. He was shot three times in the street in Sofia. He had a seven-year-old daughter at the time of his death.

In the last third book of his trilogy BG Кръстника 3 (The Bg Godfather 3) he claims that the person on the top of the pyramid, the architect of the Bulgarian mob is actually general Liuben Gotsev (Liuben Gotzev) - a former Minister of Foreign Affairs, Minister of Interior and Communist Party member. In his scandalous book he writes that one of the most notorious gangsters from SIC (which was one of the major crime structures in Bulgaria during the "transition period"—the 1990s) Mladen Mihalev - Majo, had sexual relationship with Gotsev, and he suggests that is one of the main reasons why Majo was given such a big share from the illegal activities in the underworld. He also writes that prime minister Boyko Borisov was a recruit of the Bulgarian mafia, at the time he was the general secretary of the ministry of interior.

== Books ==
- ВИС. 2006. ISBN 9549761126.
- ВИС-2. 2006. ISBN 9549761185.
- СИК. Vol. 1. 2007. ISBN 9549761223.
- СИК. Vol. 2. 2007. ISBN 9549761290.
- СИК. Vol. 3. 2007. ISBN 9549761363.
- На пилона. 2007. ISBN 9549761371.
- BG Кръстника – Истинската история на Маджо. 2007. ISBN 978-954-340-087-4.
- BG Кръстника 2 – Маргина, Бойко и другите. 2007.
- BG Кръстника 3 – Любен Гоцев – истинският Кръстник. 2008.

== See also ==
- List of unsolved murders (2000–present)
