= Debar dialect =

Dialect of Macedonian

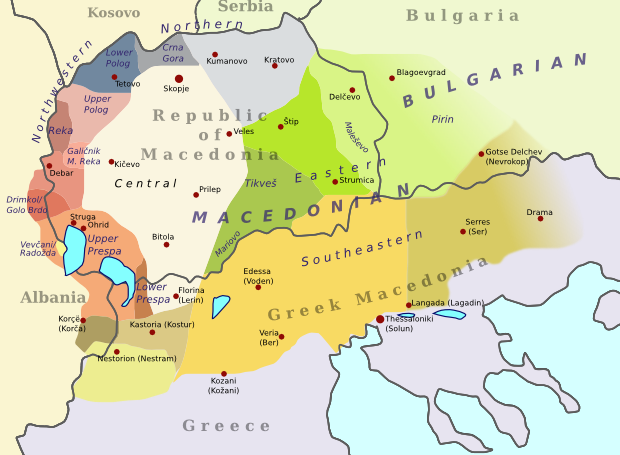
The Debar dialect on the map of the Macedonian dialects

The Debar dialect (Macedonian: Дебарски дијалект, Debarski dijalekt) is a member of the subgroup of the western and north-western dialects of the western group of dialects of Macedonian. The dialect is mainly spoken in the city of Debar and the surrounding areas in North Macedonia. The Debar dialect is closed with the Reka dialect and the dialect of Galicnik. In the dialect are used a lot of archaic words.

== Phonological characteristics ==
- fixed accent
- /d͡ʒ/ deaffricated and merged with /ʒ/
- the Proto-Slavic *ǫ has denasalized to [o] (*rǫka → рока)
- use of o instead of the soft form (крв > корв)
- absence of the intervocalic [v] in the plural forms of monosyllabic nouns (e.g. лебо(в)и, дождо(в)и, etc.)

== Morphological characteristics ==
- use of ќа instead of ќе
- three definite articles pertaining to the position of the object (see Macedonian grammar)
- use of the suffix -т for third person singular
