= Selci, Struga =

Selci Селци
- Village
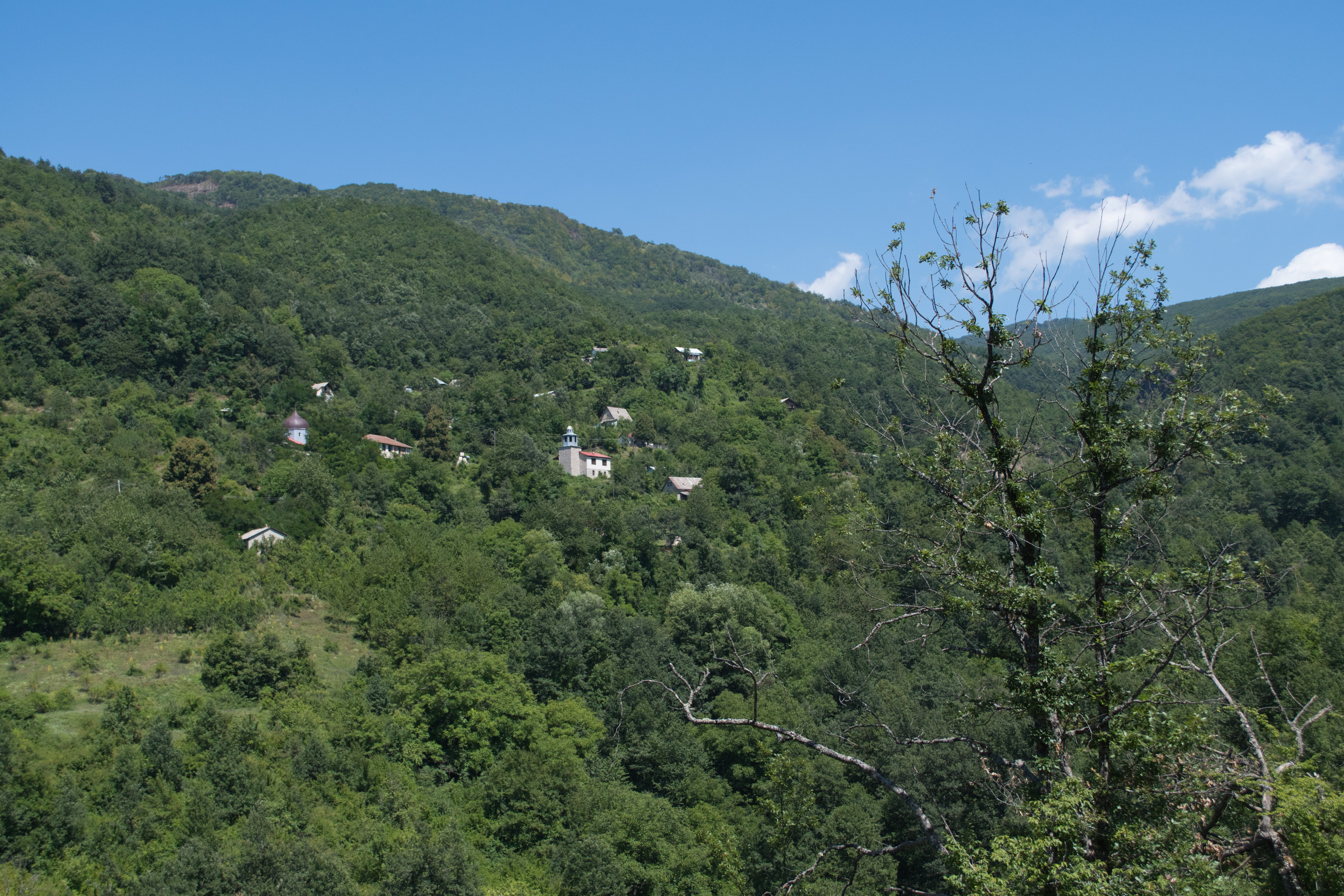
- Panoramic view of the village

- Location within North Macedonia
- Country: North Macedonia
- Region: Southwestern
- Municipality: Struga
- Elevation: 1,244 m (4,081 ft)

Population (2021)
  - Total: 6
- Time zone: UTC+1 (CET)
- Area code: +38946

Selci is a village in Municipality of Struga, North Macedonia.

== Demographics ==
Selci (Silec) is recorded in the Ottoman defter of 1467 as a village in the vilayet of Upper Dibra, part of the timar of Muhidin. The settlement was recorded as abandoned.

In the 19th century Selci was a Bulgarian village in Debar kaza of the Ottoman Empire. According to the statistics of Vasil Kanchov ("Macedonia. Ethnography and Statistics") in 1900 there were 1,050 Bulgarian inhabitants, all Christians. The entire Christian population of the village is under the rule of Bulgarian Exarchate. According to the Secretary of the Exarchate Dimitar Mishev ("La Macédoine et sa Population Chrétienne”) in 1905 there were 1,144 Bulgarian Exarchists in Selce and a Bulgarian school operated in the village. According to statistics from the newspaper Debarski Glas in 1911 in Selci there were 150 Bulgarian Exarchate houses.

According to the 2002 census, the village was without inhabitants. As of the 2021 census, Selci had 6 residents with the following ethnic composition:

- Macedonians: 5
- Persons for whom data is taken from administrative sources: 1
