= Macedonian Heraldic Society =

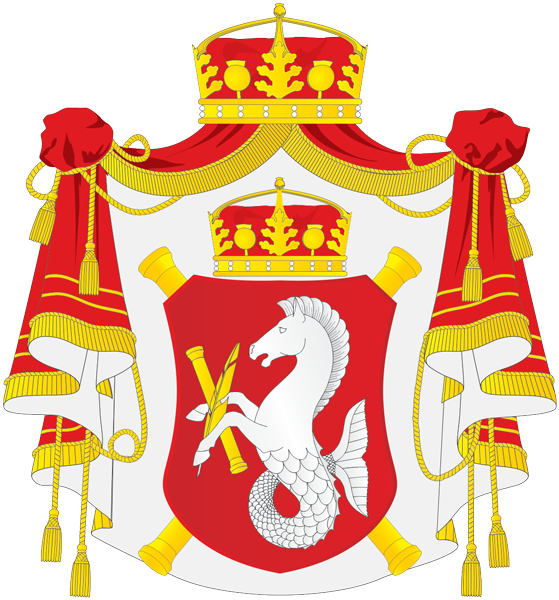
- Greater Coat of Arms of the Macedonian Heraldic Society
- Abbreviation: MHS
- Formation: 2003
- Members: Members of MHS
- President: Jovan Jonovski
- Vice President: Ivan Nacevski
- Secretary: Pavle Arsoski
- Website: heraldika.org.mk

The Macedonian Heraldic Society (MHS) is the only professional body in the field of heraldry, vexillology, phaleristics, chivalristics and nobiliar issues in North Macedonia. The society was founded on 2 July 2003 in Skopje under the name Macedonian Heraldry Society, and changed to its current name in 2018.

== Society Coat of Arms and Flag ==
Society Coat of Arms and Flag
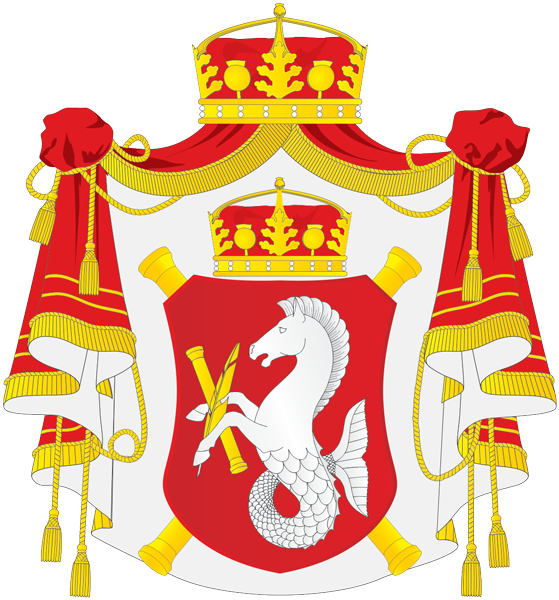

Versions
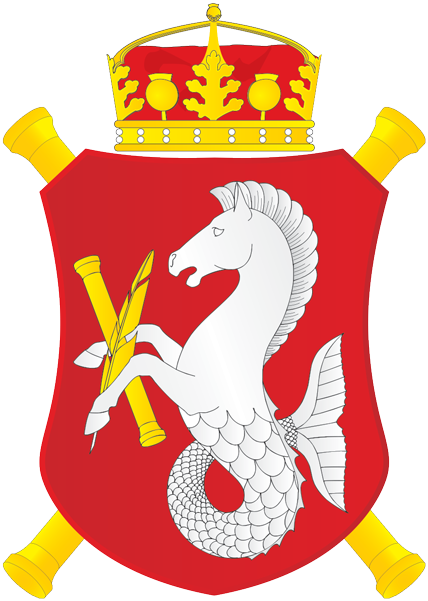
- Middle Coat of Arms the Macedonian Heraldic Society

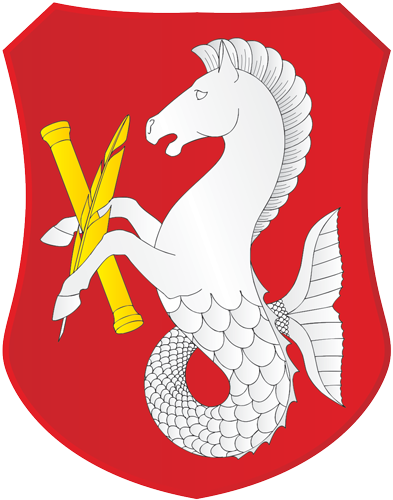
- Lesser Coat of Arms of the Macedonian Heraldic Society

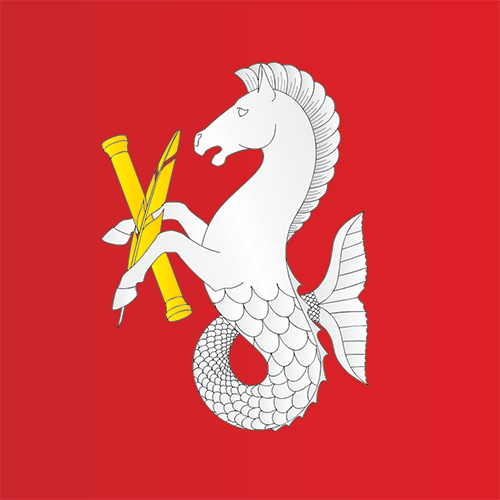
- Flag of the Macedonian Heraldic Society
- Armiger: Macedonian Heraldry Society
- Adopted: 2003
- Shield: Gules, a hippocamp Argent.
- Other elements: Herald’s batons, heraldic crown, mantle

=== Coat of arms ===
The coat of arms of the Macedonian Heraldic Society has three heraldic representations: lesser, middle and greater coat of arms.

The lesser coat of arms of the society is blazoned: Gules, a hippocamp Argent holding baton and quill in saltire, all Or.

The middle coat of arms of the society is blazoned: Gules, a hippocamp Argent holding baton and quill in saltire, all Or. Shield crowned with heraldic crown, behind shield herald's batons, all Or.

The greater coat of arms of the society is blazoned: Over the crowned shield a mantle Gules doubled Argent, crowned with heraldic crown Or.

=== Flag ===
The flag of the society is a banner with a 1:1 proportion and with the blazon of the coat of arms.

== Executive Board ==
President and Chief herald of the society is Jovan Jonovski, physicist, theologian and historian, member of the Orders and Medals Committee of the President of the Republic of Macedonia (2009–2019), member of the International Commission on Orders of Chivalry (ICOC), an member of Académie Internationale d'Héraldique (AIH). Editor of "Macedonian Herald".

Vice President and Vardar herald of the society is Ivan Nacevski, Dentist, secretary of "Macedonian Herald".

Secretary and Eragon herald of the society is Pavle Arsoski, general, historian, member of the parliament of the Republic of Macedonia,

== Activities ==
=== Popularization of heraldry ===
Popularization of heraldry is accomplished through lectures, workshops and presence in the media.

Lectures were held by several speakers from home and abroad. Among the lecturers were Dr. Stoyan Antonov, President of the Bulgarian Heraldry and Vexillology Society, Prof. Dr. Ivan Balta from Faculty of Philosophy in Osijek, Croatia, which had several lectures, and Dr. Vujadin Ivanisevic from Institute for Byzantine Studies in Belgrade, Serbia.

Lectures on theoretical heraldry and practical training workshops were held in cooperation with several organizations. The biggest was the collaboration with the Museum of Macedonia on the project "The Amazing World of Heraldry“ during which, for three years lectures and workshops were held.

The popularization of heraldry, vexillology and phaleristics is accomplished through many articles in daily newspapers and appearances on broadcast media too.

=== Research of the Macedonian heraldic heritage ===
Studies of the Macedonian heraldic heritage is the central part of the activities of the society. Researches have been performed in archives, libraries, private collections in Zagreb, Stuttgart, Brussels and Washington. Research results are exchanged and supplemented with colleagues from other countries on congresses and symposia, as well as discussion groups and forums.

=== Design of arms, flags, orders and decorations ===
Macedonian Heraldic Society is engaged in designing coats of arms, flags, orders, decorations, etc. Among the most important are the coat of arms of the president of North Macedonia, the Coat of arms of the Macedonian Orthodox Church – Ohrid Archbishopric and the Order of Merit for Macedonia.

The Macedonian Heraldic Society is actively working on improving the quality and standardization of the municipal heraldry in North Macedonia. Members of the society are authors of coats of arms and flags of the municipalities: Radovish, Novo Selo, Kriva Palanka and Kochani. The society was also consulted in the selection of several municipal arms.

Coat of arms of the president of North Macedonia

Coat of arms of the Municipality of Radovish

Coat of arms of the Municipality of Kriva Palanka

Coat of arms of the Municipality of Kochani

Flag of the Municipality of Radovish

Flag of the Municipality of Kriva Palanka

Flag of the Municipality of Kochani

=== Establishing a Heraldic Register ===
One of the activities of the society is establishing a register of both old and new heraldic achievements. For the registered arms, an appropriate matricula is issued. They are also published in "Macedonian Herald“.

== Beginnings ==
In 2000 the president of the society, Jovan Jonovski, published the website "Heraldry in Macedonia" where coats of arms and citations from the book Coats of Arms of Macedonia by Aleksandar Matkovski were published in English and Macedonian. The website was complemented with arms used in Macedonia: territorial, corporate and personal. The website began to publish information on historical, theoretical and heraldry in general. A group of interested individuals gathered around the website, mostly Macedonians from abroad. When sufficient number of interested individuals was finally reached, in July 2003 the Macedonian Heraldry Society was founded.

== Macedonian Herald ==
The Macedonian Heraldic Society publishes an official journal, the "Macedonian Herald", where the society's members publish articles on their research topics, municipal coats of arms and flags are commented, heraldic achievements registered in the heraldic register are published, as well as articles in the field of phaleristics, signumanistics and emblematics.

The journal is published in Macedonian and English.

Besides the printed edition, the "Macedonian Herald" is freely available on the website of the society.

== International Activities ==
The Macedonian Heraldic Society is a full member of Confédération Internationale de Généalogie et d'Héraldique (CIGH) since the 29th International Congress on Genealogy and Heraldic Sciences in Stuttgart, Germany, held in September 2010.

At the 24th Congress of the International Federation of Vexillological Associations (FIAV) in August 2011 in Washington, USA, the society became a full member of this prestigious organization.

The Macedonian Heraldic Society gave logistical support for the establishment of the Bulgarian Heraldry and Vexillology Society (BHVS). A MHS delegation regularly participates on BHVS annual meetings.

The president of the society attended the founding of the Croatian Heraldic and Vexillologic Association (CHVA).

The society also collaborates with the Serbian Heraldry Society.

The members of the society have published articles in the specialized magazines: "Grb i Zastava" of the Croatian Heraldic and Vexillologic Association, "Herold" of the Bulgarian Heraldry and Vexillology Society and "Glas heralda" and "Ocilo" of the Serbian Heraldry Society.

== Projects ==
- "The Amazing World of Heraldry", Museum of Macedonia, 2007–2009.
- Permanent exhibition "Heraldry in Macedonia", Museum of Macedonia, 2009.
- Coats of Arms of Alexander of Macedonia in European Armorials, Ministry of Culture of the Republic of Macedonia, 2010–2011.

== See also ==
- Coat of arms of the Macedonian Orthodox Church – Ohrid Archbishopric
- Coat of arms of the president of North Macedonia
- Flag of North Macedonia
- List of flags of North Macedonia
- National emblem of North Macedonia
- Orders, decorations, and medals of North Macedonia
