= Milka Eftimova =

Macedonian opera singer (1936–2025)

- Милка Ефтимова
- Born: 23 February 1936; Radoviš, Yugoslavia
- Died: 13 August 2025 (aged 89); Skopje, North Macedonia
- Education: Academy of Music
- Occupation: Opera singer
- Years active: 1961–2000
- Awards: Order of Merit for Macedonia

Milka Eftimova (Macedonian: Милка Ефтимова; 23 February 1936 – 13 August 2025) was a Macedonian opera singer and pedagogue. A mezzo-soprano, she began her operatic career with the Slovenian Philharmonic Orchestra in May 1961 and later became a soloist with the Macedonian National Theatre (MNT) in Skopje. Eftimova began performing at the Ljubljana Opera House in 1967, remaining there until 1978. She returned to the MNT in 1978 and stayed there until her retirement in 1991. From 1985 to 2000, Eftimova taught as a professor at the Faculty of Music - Skopje. Eftimova was a recipient of the Order of Merit for Macedonia.

== Early life and education ==
Eftimova was born on 23 February 1936 in Radoviš, Yugoslavia. She was the daughter of the violin player Kosta and her mother Katerina was the daughter of the Macedonian Struggle fighter Petrush Pop Lazarov; she had four siblings. Eftiova began singing when she was six and a half years old, and her ability was discovered by a high school music teacher. She began her education in Radvoiš, studying singing under the tutelage of K. Trpkov. Eftimova also received an education at the Academy of Music in Ljubljana under Julius Betetto and earned a master's degree.

== Career ==
She began her career in opera as a soloist in several parts under the direction of Lovro von Matačić with the Slovenian Philharmonic Orchestra in Vienna in May 1961. During her career, Eftimova performed more than 40 roles in a mezzo-soprano role. Under Von Matačić, Eftimova performed Carmen in Frankfurt. As she was a scholarship holder at the Skopje Opera, she became a soloist at the Macedonian National Theatre (MNT) in Skopje at the behest of the conductors Todor Skalovski and Petre Bogdanov in late 1961. Eftimova's first role was the part of Atsucena in Giuseppe Verdi's opera Il trovatore. She later performed in the operas, Marfa in Modest Mussorgsky's Cavalleria rusticana, as Suzuki in Giacomo Puccini's Madama Butterfly and as Oprheus in Orpheus and Eurydice.

Eftimova performed as a soloist in Skalovski's cantana Velichanie during the second festival year of the Ohrid Music Summer. At the Second International Competition in Sofia Bulgaria, in 1963, she won the third prize from 117 candidates from 26 countries. Eftimova performed the role of Carmen in Georges Bizet's opera of the same name at the newly rebuilt MNT assembly building starting from 1965. In 1966, as a scholarship holder of the Government of the Republic of Macedonia in Santa Cecilia in Rome, she travelled to Italy for specialisation. Eftimova was awarded a two-month scholarship to stay at the Accademia Musicale Chigiana in Siena. She took part in 21 performances over a short period of time.

Following repeated invites, she began working for the Ljubljana Opera House in September 1967, performing more than 40 roles. In Ljubljana, Eftimova performed multiple roles, as many as 17 premieres. The Countess in The Queen of Spades by Pyotr Ilyich Tchaikovsky, Kabaniha in Leoš Janáček's Káťa Kabanová, Arlenta in Claudio Monteverdi's The Coronation of Pompeii, Hata in Bedřich Smetana's comedy The Bartered Bride and Mother Jela in the melodrama Equinox by Marjan Kozina. She returned to Skopje from Ljubljana in 1978. Eftimova performed in a series of renewed premieres from the iron repertoire such as Il Trovatore, Ulrika in Un ballo in maschera, Olga in Pyotr Ilyich Tchaikovsky's Eugene Onegin, Cavalleria Rusticana and Prince Igor and as Marthe in Charles Gounod's Faust. She also performed in such anthological premiere roles as Marcellina in Wolfgang Amadeus Mozart's The Marriage of Figaro and Neda in Trajko Prokopiev's Kuzman Kapidan. Eftimova performed Macedonian operatic music in countries such as Bulgaria, China, France, Italy, Norway and Uzbekistan.

Her final opera role was in Carmen on 6 November 1991, her 157th performance, having performed more than 40 operatic roles. Eftimova's recorded works were complied into the 2009 DVD/CD collection Svetnot na eden glas (A World of One Voice). From 1985 to 2000, Eftimova worked as a full professor at the Faculty of Music - Skopje in Skopje. She also taught at the State Music-Ballet School Center in Skopje and the Secondary Music School in Štip. Her pupils have included the likes of Vesna Ginovska-Ilkovska. From 2006, Eftimova organised a memorial exhibition of her career in Radoviš.

== Death ==
She died in Skopje on 13 August 2025. Her funeral was held in Radoviš on 16 August 2025, and was buried at Radoviš Cemetery.

== Recognition ==
She was a recipient of multiple state awards for her contribution to art and music, such as the 11 October award in 1985, St. Kliment Ohridski in 2001, Mother Teresa in 2009, and the Order of Merit for Macedonia in March 2022. In October 2025, an exhibition dedicated to Eftimova was opened at the Memorial House of Mother Teresa.
