= Coat of arms of Macedonia =

Coat of arms of Macedonia may refer to:

- Coat of arms of Macedonia (region) - early modern coats of arms of the historical region of Macedonia
- Coat of arms of North Macedonia - official national emblem of modern North Macedonia
- Proposed coat of arms of North Macedonia - various propositions for new emblem of North Macedonia
- Coat of arms of the president of North Macedonia - presidential emblem of North Macedonia

== See also ==
- Macedonia (disambiguation)
