= National symbols of North Macedonia =

The national symbols of North Macedonia, as stated in the constitution, are the coat of arms, the flag and the anthem. After the independence of North Macedonia from Yugoslavia, the country made some changes in the national symbols. The flag was changed two times and today's flag includes an eight-ray sun on a red background, while the coat of arms from the Socialist Republic of Macedonia was retained, except the red star which was removed.

== National flag ==
National flag

The flag of the Republic of North Macedonia depicts a stylised yellow sun on a red field, with eight broadening rays extending from the centre to the edge of the field. The eight-rayed sun represents "the new sun of Liberty" referred to in the national anthem Denes nad Makedonija (Today over Macedonia). It was created by Miroslav Grčev and was adopted on 5 October 1995 after a one-year economic blockade imposed by Greece in order to force the then-Republic of Macedonia to remove the ancient Macedonian Vergina Sun from the flag.

== Coat of arms ==
Coat of arms

The coat of arms of North Macedonia is composed of two curved garlands of sheaves of wheat, tobacco leaves and opium poppy fruits, tied by a ribbon decorated with the embroidery of traditional Macedonian folk motives. In the centre of the ovoid frame are depicted a mountain, a lake and a sunrise. These devices are said to represent "the richness of the country and its struggle and freedom". The whole composition and design are based on the pattern from the emblem of the SFR Yugoslavia and does not have any roots in the historical heraldic coats of arms of Macedonia. The features of the national emblem contain a rising sun which symbolizes freedom, the Šar Mountains with its peak named Ljuboten or mount Korab and the river Vardar. The emblem also contains poppy fruits; poppy was brought to Macedonia by the Ottoman Empire in the first half of 19th century.

== National anthem ==
Denes nad Makedonija (English translation: "Today over Macedonia") is the national anthem of North Macedonia. It was composed by Todor Skalovski and the lyrics were written by Vlado Maleski in the 1940s. It was later performed as a popular song of the Macedonians during the time of Socialist Republic of Macedonia, a part of Yugoslavia. Later the song was officially adopted as the anthem of the newly independent Macedonia.

== Unofficial symbols ==
The flag of the Republic of Macedonia between 1992 and 1995

- Kutlesh flag (official flag from 1991 to 1995) contains a stylized yellow sun centered on a red field with eight main and eight secondary rays emanating from the sun, tapering to a point. The Vergina Sun is a 16-ray star covering what appears to be the royal burial larnax of Philip II of Macedon, discovered in Vergina, Greece, and it is believed to have been associated with ancient Macedonian kings such as Alexander the Great and Philip II, although it was used as a symbol in Greek art long before the Macedonian period. The symbol was discovered in the present-day Greek region of Macedonia, and Greeks regard it as an exclusively Greek symbol. The Vergina Sun on a red field was the first flag of the Republic of Macedonia until it was removed under an agreement reached between the Republic of Macedonia and Greece in September 1995. Greece had also lodged a claim for trademark protection of the Vergina Sun as an official state emblem at the World Intellectual Property Organization (WIPO) in July 1995. Nevertheless, the flag is still used unofficially as a national symbol by many Macedonians and organisations in the Macedonian diaspora.
- The Macedonian Lion first appears in the Fojnica Armorial from 17th century. On the coat of arms is a crown, inside a yellow-crowned lion is depicted standing rampant, on a red background. On the bottom enclosed in a red and yellow border is written: "Macedonia". It also appears as a red lion on a golden field. The use of the lion to represent "Macedonia" was continued in foreign heraldic collections throughout the 16th to 18th centuries. The lion was also used in the 19th century by the Internal Macedonian Revolutionary Organization, but this organisation modeled itself after the earlier Bulgarian revolutionary tradition and adopted the lion from it. After Macedonia proclaimed independence, a proposal by Miroslav Grčev was put forward in 1992 to replace the current coat of arms with this golden lion on a red shield but it was not approved. However, modern versions of this historical lion have been added to the emblems of several political parties, organizations and sports clubs in Macedonia and with the Macedonian diaspora.
