= List of flags of North Macedonia =

This is a list of flags which have been used in the 20th century or are still used on the territory of North Macedonia, or by its citizens, in 21st century.

== North Macedonia ==
Flag	Date	Use	Description
	1995–present	Flag of North Macedonia (civil, state, and war flag)	Golden-yellow sun with eight rays extending to the edges of the red field
	1995–present	Flag of North Macedonia (vertical)	

== Historical flags ==
Flag	Date	Use	Description
	1992–1995	Flag of the Republic of Macedonia	Red flag with the yellow Vergina Sun in the middle
	1947–1991	Flag of the Socialist Federal Republic of Yugoslavia	Three equal horizontal bands, blue on the top, white in the middle, and red on the bottom, five-pointed red star in the center
	1946–1991	Flag of the People's Republic of Macedonia (1946–1963) and Socialist Republic of Macedonia (1963–1991)	Red flag with a gold-edged red star in the top-hoist corner
	1944–1946	Flag of Democratic Federal Macedonia	Red flag with a gold-edged red star in the middle
	1944	Flag of the First Macedonian Brigade (WW2)	Red flag with the unit's name written in yellow capital Cyrillic letters in the lower half
	1941–1945	Flag of Yugoslav partisan movement	Three equal horizontal bands, blue on the top, white in the middle, and red on the bottom, with a red star in the white field
	1920s–present	Historical flag of the Internal Macedonian Revolutionary Organization (IMRO) used by political parties in Bulgaria and North Macedonia	Horizontal bicolor of red and black
Flag of the Macedonian Colony in Petrograd, Russia	1914–1917	Flag of the Macedonian Colony (Macedonian Scientific and Literary Society) in Petrograd, Russian Empire	Red field with a unicorn in a white square in the canton and a sun in the lower fly (outer) corner above which there is the inscription "ONE INDEPENDENT MACEDONIA"
	3 August – 13 August 1903	Flag of the 3rd cheta of Pitu Guli, proclaimed years later as flag of the Republic of Kruševo. In fact, the insurgents in Kruševo flew Bulgarian flags in many places.	Red banner with a symbol representing unity, with text writing Svoboda ili smart ("Freedom or Death")

== Local flags ==
Flag	Date	Use	Description
Flag of the Mijaks		Flag of the Mijaks	
The newly discovered Mijak flag		Flag of a Mijak family in Galičnik	Red rectangle inside which are circle, a horseman, a horseman with a crown, a crescent and moon, and another figure (possibly a flower)
Mijaks wedding flag		Mijaks' wedding flag	
Flag of Albania		Flag of Albania, used by Albanians in North Macedonia and publicly displayed in local areas with a majority Albanian population	Silhouetted black double-headed eagle in the center of a red background

== Municipal flags ==
Note: This list is incomplete.

Flag	Date	Use	Description
	2012–present	Aerodrom Municipality	
	?–present	Aračinovo Municipality	Red flag with the coat of arms in the middle and two thin horizontal black stripes near the top and bottom
	?–present	Berovo Municipality	Light (sky) blue flag with red insignia in the middle
	2006–present	Bitola Municipality	White background with the municipal coat of arms in the middle
	?–present	Bogdanci Municipality	Blue and red flag (two blue and two red quarters), with the municipality coat of arms in the middle
	1996–present	Bogovinje Municipality	Red background with the municipal coat of arms in the middle
	1996–present	Bosilovo Municipality	
		Brvenica Municipality	
	2010–present	Čair Municipality	White background with the municipal coat of arms in the middle
		Čaška Municipality	
	2016–present	Municipality of Češinovo-Obleševo	
		Centar Župa Municipality	
		Municipality of Čučer-Sandevo	Cyan background with the municipal coat of arms in the middle
		Debar Municipality	
		Debarca Municipality	
		Municipality of Delčevo	
	2015–present	Demir Hisar Municipality	
		Demir Kapija Municipality	Yellow background with the municipal coat of arms in the middle
		Dojran Municipality	
		Dolneni Municipality	
	?–present	Gevgelija Municipality	Flag with a blue bar over a white bar and the coat of arms of the municipality near the hoist
		Gostivar Municipality	
	1996–present	Ilinden Municipality	Red vertical flag with a 12-pointed sun and the letter "I" in Cyrillic (И)
		Jegunovce Municipality	
		Karbinci Municipality	White background with the municipal coat of arms in the middle
		Kavadarci Municipality	
Flag of Kisela Voda Municipality	?–2015	Kisela Voda Municipality	
	2010–present	Municipality of Kočani	
		Konče Municipality	Red background with the municipal coat of arms in the middle
	2006–present	Kratovo Municipality	
	2009–present	Kriva Palanka Municipality	
	2005–present	Karpoš Municipality	Yellow background with the municipal coat of arms in the middle
		Municipality of Krivogaštani	Red background with the municipal coat of arms in the middle
		Municipality of Kruševo	
	2002–present	Kumanovo Municipality	Red background with the municipal coat of arms in the middle
		Lipkovo Municipality	
		Lozovo Municipality	
	?–present	Makedonska Kamenica Municipality	
		Makedonski Brod Municipality	
		Municipality of Mavrovo and Rostuša	
		Mogila Municipality	
		Negotino Municipality	
		Novaci Municipality	
		Novo Selo Municipality	
		Municipality of Pehčevo	
		Petrovec Municipality	
		Plasnica Municipality	
	?–present	Prilep Municipality	Dark blue background with the municipal coat of arms, outlined in white, in the middle
	2015–present	Municipality of Probištip	
	2007–present	Rankovce Municipality	
		Resen (municipality)	White background with the municipal coat of arms in the middle
		Rosoman Municipality	
		Skopje Municipality	
		Municipality of Sopište	
		Municipality of Staro Nagoričane	
		Municipality of Štip	White background with the municipal coat of arms in the middle
	?–present	Struga Municipality	Blue vertical flag with the coat of arms in the middle
	?–present	Strumica Municipality	White vertical flag with the coat of arms and a blue-yellow border
		Municipality of Studeničani	
	?–present	Radoviš Municipality	
	2007–present	Tearce Municipality	
	?–present	Tetovo Municipality	Horizontal tricolor of red, black, and yellow, with stripe proportions ≈ 3:2:1
		Valandovo Municipality	
		Vasilevo Municipality	
	?–present	Veles Municipality	
	?–present	Vevchani Municipality	
	2007–present	Vinica Municipality	Red and blue bicolor flag with outline of Vinica Fortress and an icon
		Municipality of Vrapčište	
		Zelenikovo Municipality	
	1996–present	Municipality of Želino	
		Zrnovci Municipality	
		Šuto Orizari Municipality	White background with the municipal coat of arms in the middle

=== Former flags of municipalities ===
Flag	Date	Use	Description
Old flag of Aračinovo Municipality		Aračinovo Municipality	
Old flag of Kisela Voda Municipality	?–2015	Kisela Voda Municipality	
Old Flag of Šuto Orizari Municipality		Šuto Orizari Municipality	

== Political party flags ==
Flag	Date	Use	Description
New flag of SDSM	2019–present	SDSM	
Old flag of SDSM	?–2019	SDSM	
	1997–present	Liberal Democratic Party	
	2020–present	Green Humane City	
Link to file	2002–present	Democratic Union of the Vlachs of Macedonia	
	1997–present	Albanian Democratic Party	
	1992–present	Democratic Party of Turks	
		Dostoinstvo	
	1944–1990	League of Communists of Macedonia	

== Organization flags ==
Flag	Date	Use	Description
		Flag of Macedonian Heraldic Society	Red flag with the coat of arms of the society
		Official flag of the Radko Association in North Macedonia and Bulgaria	
	1962–1985	Flag of the Movement for the Liberation and Unification of Macedonia	
