= Coat of arms of the President of North Macedonia =

Coat of arms of the President of the Republic of North Macedonia
- Armiger: President of the Republic of North Macedonia
- Adopted: 2 December 2009
- Shield: Gyronny of 16 Or and Gules rotated by half a gyron, a Bezant fimbriated Gules.
- Other elements: Two branches of Macedonian Oak with eight leafs and eight fruits in saltire all Or

The coat of arms of the President of the Republic of North Macedonia is the official coat of arms of the President of North Macedonia. It was adopted on 2 December 2009, designed by the Macedonian Heraldry Society earlier that year, having been registered by the society on 10 June.

The shield of the coat of arms has the sun from the flag of North Macedonia. Below the shield are two branches of Macedonian oak with eight leaves and acorns on each branch. The oak is used due to it being native to the region and representing strength.

The coat of arms was designed by the Macedonian Heraldry Society members Stojanče Veličkovski, Petar Gajdov and Jovan Jonovski.

== See also ==
- Flag of North Macedonia
- Golden Lion of Macedonia
- National anthem of North Macedonia
- National emblem of North Macedonia
- Vergina Sun
