= Denko Maleski =

Macedonian intellectual, diplomat, and professor

Denko Maleski (Macedonian: Денко Малески) is a Macedonian intellectual, diplomat, and professor at Ss. Cyril and Methodius University of Skopje.

== Biography ==
Maleski was born on 14 November 1946 in Skopje, then in FPR Yugoslavia. He is a son of Vlado Maleski, who wrote the lyrics of the Macedonian national anthem. Denko Maleski received his Master of Laws from the University of St. Cyril and Methodius in Skopje in 1977, then his PhD in International Relations from the University of Ljubljana in 1981. In 1985, he was elected Dean of the Faculty of Interdisciplinary Studies and Journalism at the University of Skopje. During 1990–91, Maleski was a visiting Fulbright professor at Bowling Green University in Ohio, USA. During 1998–99, he led a research program at the Woodrow Wilson Center for International Studies at Princeton University, USA. Denko Maleski was the first foreign minister of then Republic of Macedonia from 1991 to 1993, and ambassador to the United Nations, from 1993 to 1997. He is a professor at the Law Faculty at the University of Skopje and the director of the postgraduate studies of "International Politics and International Law". He is the author of numerous scientific publications, articles and essays.

== Views ==
He made the following statement to a Greek TV channel in 2006:

The idea that Alexander the Great belongs to us, was at the mind of some outsider political groups only! These groups were insignificant the first years of our independence but the big problem is that the old Balkan nations have . . . learned to legitimate themselves through their history. In [the] Balkans, if you want to be recognised as a nation, you need to have history of 2000 or 3000 years old. So since you [the Greeks] made us to invent a history, we invent it! . . . You forced us to the arms of the extreme nationalists who today claim that we are direct descendants of Alexander the Great.

In 2007, Maleski said that the separate Macedonian nation was formed in the Second World War. He also stated that Macedonians and Bulgarians were one nation in the past. In an interview in 2020 to a Bulgarian TV channel, regarding Macedonian-Bulgarian bilateral issues, he said that "the Macedonian side should face the objective historical truth", and "the Bulgarian side should face the reality of the contemporary existence of the Macedonian nation and language."
