= Green municipalism =

Political philosophy advocating sustainability through grassroots municipal institutions

Green municipalism is a form of municipalism in which environmental change is seen from arising with action in the municipality, rather than on a state or national basis.

It has been discussed by Brian Milani in his book, Designing the Green Economy (2000). and by the Syracuse / Onondaga County Green Party Chapter at the US National Green Gathering of August 1992.

== Examples ==
Political parties which adhere to this ideology include:

| Country | Party | Municipality | National Affiliation | Seats in Municipal Council | Notes |
|---|---|---|---|---|---|
| Austria | LINKS | Vienna | None | 23 / 1,144 | |
| Austria | Social Austria of the Future | Vienna | None | 2 / 1,144 | |
| Belgium | Team Fouad Ahidar | Brussels | None | 3 / 17 Flemish seats | |
| Canada | OneCity Vancouver | Vancouver | None | 1 / 11 | |
| Canada | Projet Montréal | Montreal | None | 36 / 65 | |
| Croatia | Zagreb is OURS | Zagreb | We can! | 19 / 47 | |
| Denmark | Miljølisten | Fanø | None | 1 / 11 | |
| Italy | Italia in Comune | Various | Action | None | |
| North Macedonia | Green Humane City | Skopje | None | 2 / 45 | |
| Poland | The City Is Ours | Warsaw | The Left | 3 / 60 | |
| Spain | Barcelona en Comú | Barcelona | Sumar | 9 / 41 | |
| Spain | Más Madrid | Madrid | Sumar | 12 / 57 | |
| Spain | Zaragoza en Común | Zaragoza | Sumar | 2 / 31 | |
| United States | D.C. Statehood Green Party | Washington, D.C. | Green Party of the United States | 0 / 13 | |

== See also ==
- Libertarian municipalism
- Green libertarianism
