= Remzi Nesimi =

Albanian university professor from North Macedonia (1933–2018)

Remzi Nesimi (1933–2018) was an Albanian linguist, professor, and researcher from North Macedonia. Nesimi's dedication to the Albanian language and education left a lasting mark, and he is remembered as a respected scholar and mentor.

== Biography ==
Remzi Nesimi was born on 25 December 1933, in Odër, Tetovo (today North Macedonia). He completed his university studies at the Albanology Department in Belgrade and earned his doctorate at the University of Prishtina. Throughout his career, he held various teaching positions, including at the University of Belgrade, the Pedagogical Academy in Skopje, and the Faculty of Philology in Skopje. He also taught at the University of Tetovo.

Beyond academia, Remzi Nesimi was a respected figure who inspired and educated younger generations in the social environment where he lived and worked. His impact extended beyond the classroom, and he served as the chairman of the Association of Albanian Language and Literature Teachers in North Macedonia.

Nesimi authored or co-authored twelve school textbooks, primarily grammar books for eight-year schools and two texts (morphology and syntax of the Albanian language) for secondary schools. Additionally, he wrote a university-level textbook titled “Libri i gjuhës shqipe për të huajt” (The Albanian Language Book for Foreigners), published in Prishtina, Skopje, and Belgrade. Nesimi was also involved in translation work.

== Awards ==
- Order of Merit for Macedonia (2021 - posthumous)
