= Simon Trpčeski =

Macedonian classical pianist

Simon Trpcheski (Simon Trpčeski), OMM (Macedonian: Симон Трпчески, pronounced [ˈsimɔn ˈtr̩ptʃɛski]) (born September 18, 1979, in Skopje, SR Macedonia), is a Macedonian classical pianist.

== Life and career ==
Trpčeski is the youngest of three children; his father was a judge and his mother a pharmacist. In 2002, he received his degree in music from the Ss. Cyril and Methodius University in Skopje, Macedonia (now North Macedonia), where he studied with Professor Boris Romanov. By then he had already made his debut in recital at London's Wigmore Hall in 2001 and had won prizes in international competitions in the United Kingdom, the Czech Republic, and Italy.

Trpčeski was chosen to join the two-year BBC Radio 3 New Generation Artists scheme in 2001, which further launched his profile to a wider audience. Since 2005 he has made a rapid series of debuts with orchestras worldwide—including the New York Philharmonic, the San Francisco Symphony, the Los Angeles Philharmonic, the Singapore Symphony Orchestra, the Hong Kong Philharmonic, and the Toronto Symphony—and has made recital tours in the United States, Europe, and Asia. In December 2005 he appeared for the first time in the International Piano Series in London, and he has performed with English orchestras including the Royal Liverpool Philharmonic Orchestra with which he has recorded all the Rachmaninov Piano Concertos, the London Philharmonic and London Symphony Orchestras, the Hallé Orchestra, the Bournemouth Symphony Orchestra, and the City of Birmingham Symphony Orchestra. In Scandinavia, he has performed with the Stockholm, Bergen, Gothenburg, and Helsinki orchestras and the Swedish Chamber Orchestra.

Trpčeski's first recital recording—an EMI Classics Debut Series compact disc including music of Tchaikovsky, Scriabin, Stravinsky and Prokofiev—received both the Editor's Choice and Debut Album awards from Gramophone magazine. Trpčeski shifted to EMI's main label with his second disc; it and its two successors comprise single-composer recitals of Rachmaninoff, Chopin, and Debussy respectively.

Trpčeski's playing has been praised for its feeling and warmth as well as its technical control. Recently in Vancouver, BC Canada (January 23, 2016), he played Liszt's Piano Concerto No. 2 in A Major with the Vancouver Symphony Orchestra under guest conductor Otto Tausk. He received an overwhelming standing ovation. (Allegro- Magazine of the VSO. Vol. 21, Issue 2)

== Awards ==
- September 2011.

National artist of Macedonia - he is the first artist that got this award

- December 2009.

Order of Merit for Macedonia

- April 2005.

Disc of the Month (April) - BBC Music Magazine

- May 2003.

"Young Artist Award" awarded by the Royal Philharmonic Society

- 2001-2003.

BBC Radio 3 New Generation Artist

- April 2000.

"Millennium World Piano Competition London" - Second place

- December 1998.

World piano contest "Yamaha Music Foundation of Europe" in Skopje - First place

== Selected recordings ==
- Rachmaninov 2010 - awarded Diapason d’Or de l’Année 2010
