= Green Humane City =

Political party in North Macedonia

Green Humane City Зелен хуман град
- Abbreviation: ZHG
- Founded: 16 September 2020; 5 years ago
- Headquarters: Skopje
- Ideology: Green municipalism Direct democracy
- Colours: Green
- Skopje City Council: 2 / 45
- Mayors: 0 / 81

Party flag

Website
- mojgrad.mk

Green Humane City (Macedonian: Зелен хуман град, romanized: Zelen human grad, ZHG) is an informal green municipalist political initiative from Skopje, North Macedonia. It functions as a horizontalist coalition of local civic organizations and activists committed to environmentalism, social justice and animal rights. Its ideological underpinnings are anti-party politics and direct democracy. Green Humane City is the owner of the participatory platform MojGrad (MyCity).

== History ==
Green Humane City was founded on 16 September 2020, on the occasion of the participatory budgeting forum "My community, my vision" organized by the member of City council Dragana Velkovska. The twelve organizations participating in the forum proposed 27 projects to the City, which were rejected by the administration.

On 13 June 2021, Green Humane City organized a rally in the centre of Skopje, protesting the cutting down of trees for the purpose of expanding a street in the Debar Maalo area.

On 14 July 2021, Green Humane City announced that it will run on the local elections 2021 with an independent list led by Velkovska and environmental activist Gorjan Jovanovski. Two days later, members of Green Humane City submitted a request for inspection of the controversial project for construction of skyscrapers in the Novo Maalo area of Skopje, effectively blocking the project.

On 17 August 2021, Green Humane City announced that it will support the mayor candidacy of Ana Petrovska, a former head of the State Environmental Inspectorate.

== Policy issues ==
Green Humane City articulates the positions of its constitutive members in the political arena. Therefore, the issues it represents stem from the agenda of its members, originally presented at the participatory budgeting forum "My community, my vision". They are systematized in six areas: clean environment (Go Green, AirCare App, Ne Bidi Gjubre), sustainable development (Mama Organa), energy independence (E.D.E.N), social justice (Romalitiko), animal protection (Anima Mundi) and urban mobility (NaTochak, Polio Plus).

== Ideology ==
The ideology of Green Humane City is rooted in the theory of municipalism. Because of this, the coalition is only focused on the capital city Skopje and does not engage in public debates on national politics or foreign policy. Apart from environmentalism, its key principles are local sovereignty and grassroots democracy, aiming for the redistribution of political power to ordinary citizens through the means of participatory budgeting and public assemblies on critical issues (such as the development of a general urban plan for Skopje). Its horizontalist structure means it has no leader, although Dragana Velkovska has emerged as the most prominent public figure.

Green Humane City defines itself as an anti-system political organization. Its communication resonates a strong anti-party sentiment, often describing parties as inherently corrupt and clientelistic, serving their own interest and that of big business instead of the public interest. Velkovska stated on several occasions that activists with experience on the ground need to take over the city councils instead of professional politicians.

=== Direct democracy ===
Green Humane City claims that representative democracy is outdated and should be replaced with direct democracy, as citizens have the means to manage the city themselves. However, the organization adheres to the deliberative model of direct democracy. According to its "essential guide for localized politics", Green Humane City's long term objective is to install complete direct democracy in the local administration by 2030.

On 22 July 2025, Green Humane City announced that it will become a political party ahead of the local elections.
