= Pavle Arsoski =

Macedonian army officer

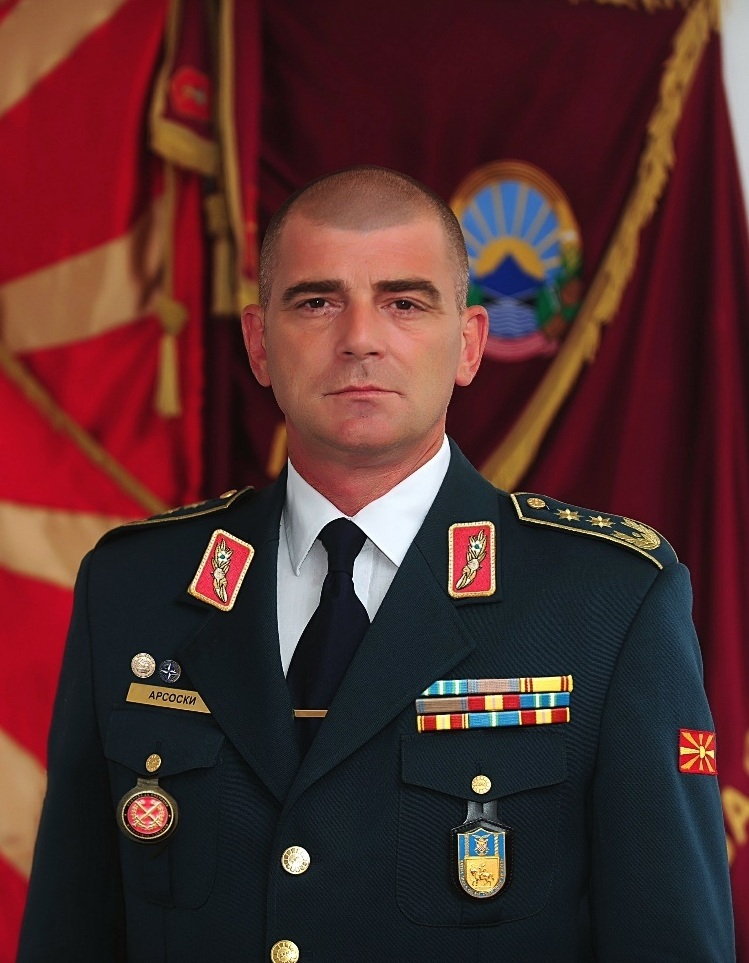
- Arsoski in 2020
- Born: 1967 (age 58–59); Gostivar, SFR Yugoslavia
- Military career
- Branch: Artillery
- Service years: 1990–2023
- Rank: Major-general
- Unit: Retired
- Commands: Operations command; Joint operations command, 1.mechanized infantry brigade; Special operations regiment and 1.infantry battalion
- Awards: Combat promotion in the rank of major in 2001; Gold, Silver and Bronze badge of the Army; Army plaque; Silver Army Badge for Service; Gold and Silver badge of the Army for Partnership, coordination and cooperation

Major general Pavle Arsoski (born 1967) is a retired Macedonian military officer.

He was commissioned in 1990 as a second lieutenant. Throughout his career he was assigned to a wide spectrum of duties, just to highlight his command of the 1st Battalion of 15th Infantry Brigade, the Special Operations Regiment and the 1st Mechanized Infantry Brigade, Commanding General (CG) of the Operations Command in 2018, before he was assigned as the advisor to the Chief of the General Staff of the Army for Combat Readiness and Operations. As of May 19, 2023, Major-General Pavle Arsoski is retired from the Army.

== Biography ==
Arsoski is native of the town of Gostivar, born in 1967. He completed Military High School in Zagreb in 1986 and continues his education on the Land Military Academy in Belgrade and Zadar, where he graduated in 1990. He was commissioned as an artillery officer and assumed his first platoon leadership duty with the Yugoslav People's Army (JNA). After the breakup of Yugoslavia, Arsoski has been in the Macedonian Army since its beginnings in April 1992. During his vast carrier, he was assigned to various staff and commanding duties starting off as a platoon leader in the artillery battalion of the 1st Honor Brigade in the capital Skopje. After that he was assigned as a company commander, deputy battalion commander and a 1st battalion CO in the 15th Infantry Brigade in Tetovo.

During the internal disturbances in the country in 2001, Arsoski was assigned as a battalion CO and later as a CO of the Battalion Combat Team in the region of Tetovo and the Mountain region of Šar Planina. For his accomplishments he received a combat promotion to the rank of major. In 2003 Arsoski was assigned to the elite of the Army, as a Chief of S-3 in the Special Operations Regiment HQ. In 2010 he was promoted to the rank of colonel and assigned to a position of the Chief of Staff in the same Regiment. He currently assumes the commanding officer role of the Special Operations Regiment in 2012. In 2013 the President of the country appointed Brigadier General Arsoski as the Commanding General of the 1st Mechanized Infantry Brigade. In 2015 he was assigned as the Deputy Commanding General of the Joint Operations Command and three years later was promoted to a Major-General and assigned to his current duty as the CG of Operations Command and performs the duty until 2021 when he is appointed as advisor to the Chief of the General Staff of the Army for Combat Readiness and Operations.

During his military career, Arsoski furthered his education at the Post Graduate Command and Staff School in 2003 in Skopje, then in 2010 graduates from the War College “Ban Josip Jelacic” in Zagreb (Republic of Croatia). He has completed an array of specialized courses in country and abroad; just to highlight: Battalion Commander Course in Germany, 21st Century Leader's Course in the George Marshall Center in Germany, Military management course, Decision making process course, Defense attaches course as well as International communications expert course and the General's and Ambassador's Course in the NATO Defense College in Rome, Italy.

== Awards and recognitions ==
- Combat promotion in the rank of major in 2001
- Gold, Silver and Bronze badge of the Army
- Army plaque
- Silver Army Badge for Service
- Gold and Silver badge of the Army and Partnership
- Coordination and cooperation badge of the Army – Gold and Silver.

== Family status and interests ==
Arsoski is married to Elizabeta, who is a deputy editor in chief at the daily national Vecher. Together they have a daughter Marija, who is a German language professor and a son Aleksandar, who is an economist. Arsoski speaks English and German.

Arsoski's hobbies mainly revolve around sports, however he is also an art aficionado. He often goes to the theater and the opera. He enjoys studying history, classic literature, heraldics and horology. He is also a Vice-President of the Association of Generals and a secretary of the Macedonian heraldic society with a title Herald of Erigon. Arsoski also actively continues to improve his formal education. In 2016 he completed his Master of Arts in History as a part of the National History Institute at St. Cyril and Methodius University. In 2021 he obtained the title of Doctor of Science at the same institute.
