= Flag of North Macedonia =

Republic of North Macedonia
- Use: National flag and ensign
- Proportion: 1∶2
- Adopted: 5 October 1995; 31 years ago (as established in the Constitution of North Macedonia)
- Design: A stylized yellow sun on a red field, with eight broadening rays extending from the centre to the edge of the field.
- Designed by: Miroslav Grčev

The national flag of North Macedonia depicts a stylized yellow sun on a red field, with eight broadening rays extending from the center to the edge of the field. It was designed by Miroslav Grčev and was adopted on 5 October 1995.

The eight-rayed sun derives from the national emblem and represents the "new sun of Liberty" referred to in "Denes nad Makedonija" ("Today over Macedonia"). The first post-Yugoslav flag of the country, adopted in 1992, known as the Kutlesh flag, featured the Vergina Sun, a symbol that had been discovered at Aegae, the first capital and burial ground of the ancient kings of Macedon. Greece imposed a year-long economic embargo in order to persuade the country to remove it from its flag, resulting in the current design.

== History ==
=== Flag of People's Republic of Macedonia (1944–1946) ===
The flag of the People's Republic of Macedonia between 1944 and 1946

The modern Macedonian state was proclaimed underground on 2 August 1944 by the Anti-Fascist Assembly of the National Liberation of Macedonia (ASNOM), the state's supreme legislative and executive body until 1946. The state was originally known as Democratic Federal Macedonia and was renamed the People's Republic of Macedonia in 1945. The ASNOM became operational in December, shortly after the German retreat. The flag was adopted during ASNOM's second plenary session in December. The first version of the flag depicted a gold-edged five-pointed red star centred on a red field.

=== Flag of Socialist Republic of Macedonia (1946–1992) ===
The flag of the Socialist Republic of Macedonia from 1946 to 1991

Between December 1946 and September 1991, the Socialist Republic of Macedonia (known as the People's Republic of Macedonia until 1963) was one of the six constituent republics of the Socialist Federal Republic of Yugoslavia. It was the only Yugoslav republic not to use the Pan-Slavic colours on its flag. Macedonia instead adopted an amended version of its previous flag, depicting communist symbols as the gold-edged five-pointed red star in the canton against a red field in a design similar to the flags of the Soviet Union or China. This flag was adopted on 31 December 1946 under Article 4 of the Constitution of the People's Republic of Macedonia. It remained in use until 1992.

=== Kutlesh flag (1992–1995) ===
The flag of the Republic of Macedonia between 1992 and 1995, bearing the Vergina Sun

In 1992, Todor Petrov, president of the nationalist Macedonian diaspora organization World Macedonian Congress, proposed the Vergina Sun as the national symbol of the Republic of Macedonia (now North Macedonia). On 11 August 1992, the newly independent Republic of Macedonia adopted the new flag to replace the old Communist "red star" insignia. The flag depicted the "Vergina Sun" symbol, a stylised yellow sun centred on a red field with eight main and eight secondary rays emanating from the sun, each tapering to a point. This ancient symbol was named after the Greek town where it had been discovered in archaeological excavations of the ancient Macedonian city of Aigai.

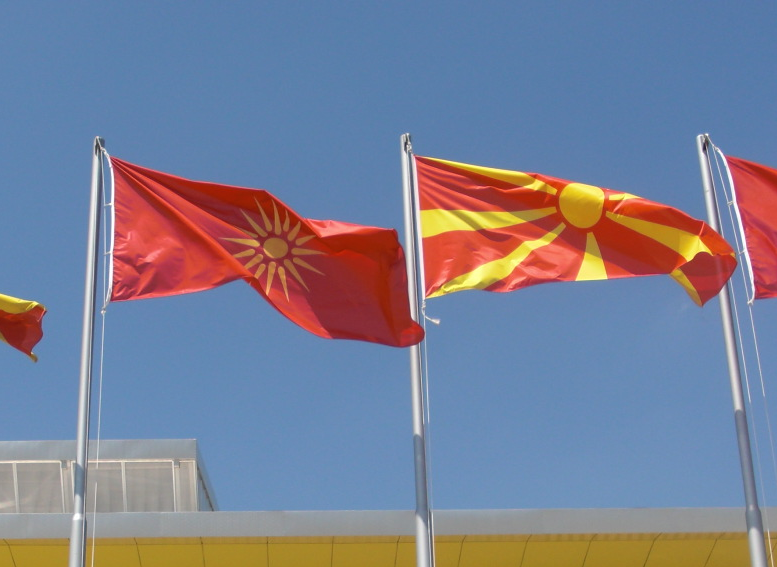
The former and current flags of Macedonia and North Macedonia in front of the Boris Trajkovski Sports Arena in Skopje

The Vergina Sun was regarded by Greece as a symbol of continuity between ancient Macedonia and modern Greek culture, and in particular as a symbol of the Argead dynasty of Philip II of Macedon and his son Alexander the Great. From the late 1970s it had also been adopted by many both in Greece and the then Socialist Republic of Macedonia to symbolise historical connections with ancient Macedonia and had been paraded in demonstrations by Greeks and ethnic Macedonians at home and abroad.

The flag, the new state's constitution and its name all became the focus of a dispute between the two countries, during which Greece imposed an economic blockade on the Republic from February 1994. In July 1995, Greece lodged a request with the World Intellectual Property Organization (WIPO) for exclusive trademark protection to the Vergina Sun.

Greek objections also prevented the flag from being flown at the United Nations Headquarters building in New York City. The blockade was lifted in October 1995 when an agreement was reached to change the flag, modify the constitution and resolve the naming dispute through United Nations-sponsored negotiations. The change of the flag was at first not accepted by conservative Macedonians, nationalists, and Greek patriots. In the first years after the change, both flags were officially flown for a long time. Between 1995 and 1998, in the municipalities where then-opposition party VMRO-DPMNE ruled, only the old flag was flown from institution buildings. Popular opinion was divided about the merits of changing the flag. As part of the Prespa Agreement (Article 8) of 2018, which resolved the naming dispute, the government of North Macedonia committed to removing the Vergina Sun from all public spaces and from public use, including its use in flags. It started removing the symbol since 12 August 2019.

The Second Party (i.e. North Macedonia) shall not use again in any way and in all its forms the symbol formerly displayed on its former national flag. Within six months of the entry into force of this Agreement, the Second Party shall proceed to the removal of the symbol displayed on its former national flag from all public sites and public usages on its territory. Archaeological artefacts do not fall within the scope of this provision.

Article 8, paragraph 2 of the Prespa Agreement

Toni Deskoski, Macedonian professor of International Law, argues that the Vergina Sun is not a Macedonian symbol but a Greek symbol that is used by ethnic Macedonians in the nationalist context of Macedonianism and that the ethnic Macedonians need to get rid of it.

=== Current flag (1995–present) ===
In 1995, the Macedonian government appointed Miroslav Grčev to draft a proposal for a new flag. Grčev went on to propose 12 designs for the flag that would have a sun in the center. Eventually, Grčev's last proposal was accepted – the design where the sun rays are on the entire surface of the flag. On 5 October 1995, the current flag of North Macedonia was adopted by the Macedonian parliament. The flag represents a golden sun with eight rays on a red field.

== Design ==
The flag ratio is 1:2 (height/width), with two colours:

System	Red	Yellow
RGB	206-32-40	249-214-22
Hexadecimal format	#CE2028	#F9D616
CMYK	0-68-65-19	0-14-89-2
Pantone (approximate)	1795 C	115 C

== See also ==
- List of flags of North Macedonia
- Emblem of North Macedonia
- Flag of Macedonia (Greece)
