= Movement for the Liberation and Unification of Macedonia =

Macedonian independence movement

- Движење за ослободување и обединување на Македонија
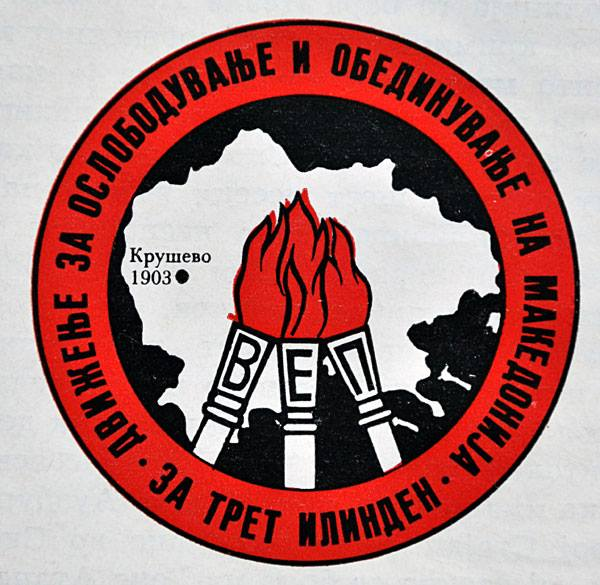
- Formation: 1962
- Founded at: Trelleborg, Sweden
- Dissolved: 1984
- President: Dragan Bogdanovski

The Movement for the Liberation and Unification of Macedonia (MLUM) (Macedonian: Движење за ослободување и обединување на Македонија (ДООМ); romanized: Dviženje za osloboduvanje i obedninuvanje na Makedonija (DOOM)), was a 20th-century Macedonian independence movement, founded by Macedonian political emigrants from SR Macedonia in Trelleborg, Sweden in 1962. The movement was founded by Macedonian emigrants from Denmark, Germany, Sweden, Austria, Belgium, France, United States, Canada and Australia. The President of the movement was Dragan Bogdanovski. The main organ of the MLUM was the newspaper Macedonian Nation (Macedonian: Македонска нација; romanized: Makedonska nacija).

== Ideology and goals ==
The MLUM was a nationalist, patriotic, anti-Yugoslav and an anti-communist movement. The movement also described itself as a revolutionary organization. The main goal of the MLUM was the secession of SR Macedonia from Yugoslavia, and the ultimate creation of an independent Macedonian state, that incorporated SR Macedonia, Aegean Macedonia and Pirin Macedonia.
