= Miroslav Grčev =

Macedonian artist and architect (born 1955)

- Мирослав Грчев

Mayor of Centar, Skopje
- In office 1996–2000

Personal details
- Born: 1955 (age 70–71) Skopje, PR Macedonia, FPR Yugoslavia
- Party: SDSM

The flag of North Macedonia, designed by Miroslav Grčev

Miroslav Grčev (Macedonian: Мирослав Грчев, pronounced ['miroslaf 'gr̩t͡ʃɛf]; born 1955) is a Macedonian architect, graphic designer, comic artist and caricaturist. He is known for having designed the current flag of North Macedonia and a popular proposal for a new coat of arms of North Macedonia.

Grčev was born in Skopje, Yugoslavia (now the capital of North Macedonia), and started to become interested in graphic design in the mid-1970s, when he worked on the design of LP records. In 1979, Grčev graduated from the Faculty of Architecture in Skopje. Today, he teaches as a professor of urban planning at the Faculty of Architecture in Skopje.

Miroslav Grčev was mayor of central Skopje municipality "Centar" in 1996-2000 from Social Democratic Union of Macedonia. He is one of the most ardent critics of the identity policy of "antiquization" and of the associated urban plan Skopje 2014, carried out by the Macedonian governments after 2006. In a project called 'Museum of Yugoslavia', Grčev openly claimed that the Macedonian state was invented within Yugoslavia at the end of the Second World War and there the Macedonian nation, Macedonian culture, Macedonian language and all Macedonian symbols were emancipated.

At 26 December 2014, he promoted his collection of articles, published between 2006 and 2014, under the title „Името на злото“ ("The Name of the Evil").

- Flag of North Macedonia
- National emblem of North Macedonia
