= Macedonian National Theatre =

Theatre in Skopje, North Macedonia

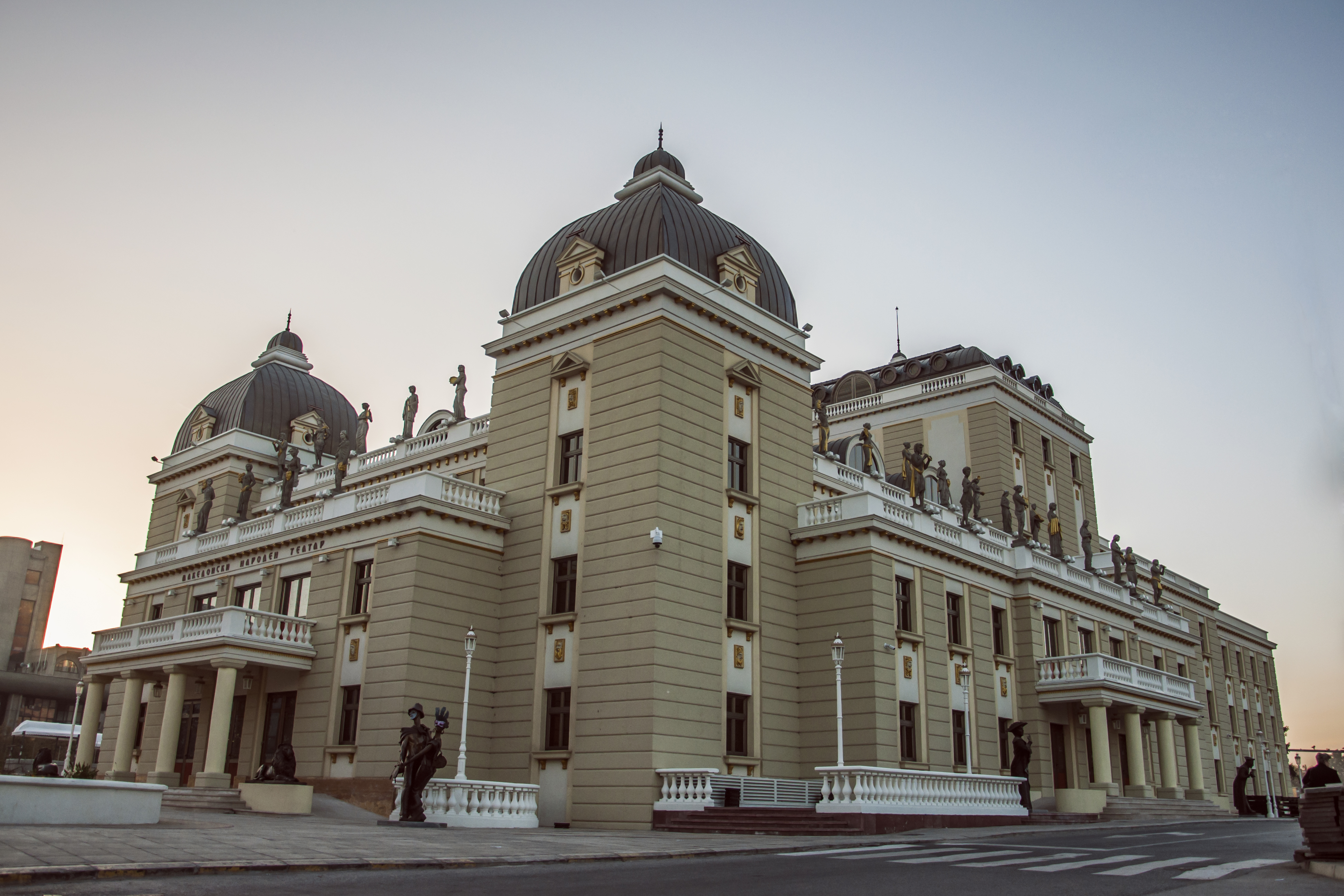
- Macedonian National Theatre
- Interactive map of Macedonian National Theatre
- Address: Skopje; North Macedonia
- Coordinates: 41°59′55″N 21°25′26″E
- Type: national theatre

Website
- mnt.mk/en/

The Macedonian National Theatre (Macedonian: Македонски народен театар, romanized: Makedonski naroden teatar), is a theatre located in Skopje in North Macedonia.

== History ==
This theater was originally built in 1906, when Macedonia was under Ottoman rule. The original building was destroyed by fire in 1914 and subsequently rebuilt in 1927. The second theater was also destroyed by the 1963 Skopje earthquake.

In 2004, plans were drawn up to rebuild it exactly as it originally appeared, as part of the Skopje 2014 project. Construction of the building, however, began in December 2007, three years before the official announcing of Skopje 2014. Construction was originally planned to be completed in 2009, though it ended up being completed a few years after. The theatre stands on its original location on the eastern bank of the Vardar. The cost is estimated to be at least 6 million euros and may be as high as 30 million euros.
