= Orders, decorations, and medals of North Macedonia =

The system of orders and medals of the Republic of North Macedonia is regulated by the Law on Awarding Decorations and Recognitions of North Macedonia. The President of North Macedonia awards all orders and medals on behalf of the nation. Awards recommendations are received and reviewed by the Commission on Awarding Decorations and Recognitions, a 14-member body appointed by the president to assist in carrying out the laws related to orders and decorations. Individuals and organizations, both Macedonian and foreign, are eligible for recognition by the state. Awards are made to recognize achievements in the fields of social, political, economic, or scientific-research work. Recognition may also be made for especially meritorious social and humanitarian aid. Other activities which may be recognized are contributions to the peaceful and stable development of North Macedonia, for contributions to democratic development, for outstanding achievements in work, or for great personal courage in defense of North Macedonia. Awards may be made posthumously.

== Orders and medals ==
- Order of the Republic of North Macedonia (Орден на Република Северна Македонија)
- Order 8-September (Орден 8ми септември)
- Order "Ilinden-1903" (Орденот Илинден 1903)
- Order of Merit (Орден за заслуги)
- Order of Military Merit (Орден за воени заслуги)
- Medal of Merit
- Medal of Bravery
