= Vlado Maleski =

Macedonian writer, publisher and partisan

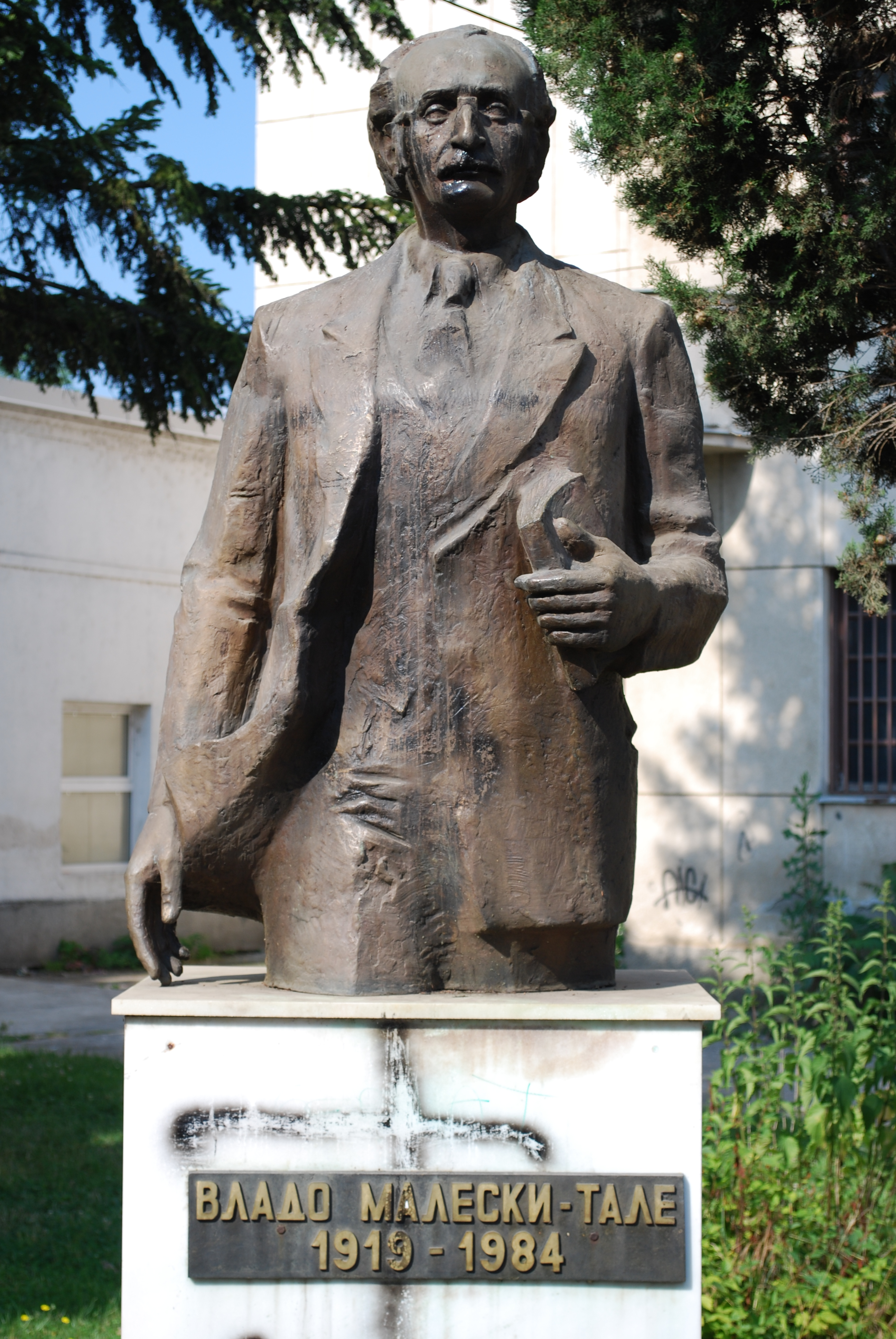
- Born: 5 September 1919; Struga, Kingdom of Serbs, Croats and Slovenes
- Died: 23 September 1984; Struga, Yugoslavia
- Occupation: Author

Vlado Maleski (Macedonian: Владо Малески; 5 September 1919 – 23 September 1984) was a Macedonian writer, publisher and partisan. He published several novels and short stories, was the author of the Macedonian national anthem "Denes nad Makedonija" (English: "Today over Macedonia"), and the script for the first Macedonian-language movie, Frosina. For his extensive contributions to the country's literature, Maleski is regarded as part of "the first generation of Macedonian prose writers". He was also a Yugoslav diplomat.

== Biography ==
Vlado Maleski was born in Struga in 1919. Maleski completed his elementary schooling in Shkodra, Albania, and his secondary schooling in Bitola. He enrolled in the University of Belgrade's Law School but did not finish his studies because of the Second World War. During the war, he was an active participant in the National Liberation War of Macedonia. He wrote the lyrics of the Macedonian national anthem "Today over Macedonia" in his hometown. After the war, he became one of the most prominent writers in contemporary Macedonian. Soon after, Maleski became a director of Radio Skopje. He sat on the editorial board of the first Macedonian publishing house. Maleski was also part of the Commission for Language and Orthography that submitted recommendations to the government on standardizing the Macedonian alphabet, which were subsequently accepted.

During his professional life, Maleski was ambassador to Lebanon, Ethiopia, and Poland and was a member of the Presidency of the Socialist Republic of Macedonia. In 1946 he became a full member of the Association of Writers of Macedonia. He was the editor of the literary magazines "Sovremenost" and "Razgledi". He wrote the script of the first Macedonian-language movie Frosina. Maleski received the following awards: "11 October", "4 July" and "AVNOJ". He died in 1984. His son, Denko Maleski, was Republic of Macedonia's first minister of foreign affairs.

== Works ==
- Ǵurǵina alova (stories, 1950)
- Branuvanja (stories, 1953)
- Ona što beše nebo (novel, 1958)
- Vojnata, luǵeto, vojnata (novel, 1967)
- Razboj (novel, 1969)
- Razgledi (articles, critics, 1976)
- Kažuvanja (stories, 1976)
- Zapisi na Ezerko Drimski (novel, 1980)
- Jazli (novel, 1990)
