= National emblem of North Macedonia =

Versions
- As used by the Government of North Macedonia
- Armiger: Republic of North Macedonia
- Adopted: July 27, 1946; 79 years ago (original version); November 16, 2009; 16 years ago (current version)

The national emblem of North Macedonia depicts two curved garlands of sheaves of wheat, tobacco leaves and opium poppy fruits, tied by a ribbon decorated with embroidery of traditional Macedonian folk motifs. In the center of the ovoid frame are depicted a mountain, a lake and a sunrise. The features of the national coat of arms contain a rising sun which symbolizes freedom, the Šar Mountains with its peak named Ljuboten or Mount Korab and the river Vardar, with Lake Ohrid. The emblem also contains opium poppy fruits; this poppy was brought to the area during Ottoman times in the first half of the 19th century. This emblem (including the red star) had been in use since 1946, shortly after the republic became part of Yugoslavia.

The emblem is based upon the emblem of Yugoslavia. Along with Belarus and the disputed breakaway state of Transnistria, North Macedonia is one of the few remaining European jurisdictions that continued to employ socialist heraldry in its national emblem, as well as the only one among all NATO member states, though the socialistic five-pointed star at the top was removed in 2009.

== History ==
The current emblem is a revised version of the one adopted on July 27, 1946, by the Assembly of the People's Republic of Macedonia. The original version of 1946 represented the Pirin Mountains, which are outside the country's territory, but part of the larger geographical region of Macedonia in order to symbolize a future "United Macedonia" as part of a new Balkan Federation. The original emblem was created by Vasilije Popović-Cico and the revised one probably by Đorđe Andrejević Kun. The supervised version was constitutionally approved by the Constitution of the People's Republic of Macedonia from December 31, 1946.

Two days after its adoption, the symbolism of the emblem was described in the Nova Makedonija newspaper, as follows:

The coat of arms of the People's Republic of Macedonia is a symbol of the freedom and the brotherhood of the Macedonian people and the richness of the Macedonian land. The five-pointed star symbolizes the National Liberation War through which the Macedonian people gained freedom. In the center, there is the Pirin mountain, the highest Macedonian mountain that has been the center of the National Liberation Wars in the past. The river displayed in the emblem is the river Vardar, the most famous Macedonian river in the republic. Pirin and Vardar at the same time symbolize the unity of all parts of Macedonia and the ideal of our people for national unity.

After Yugoslavia broke with the Soviet Union in 1948, the Soviet Union did not compel Bulgaria and Albania to form a Balkan Federation with Yugoslavia and the concept of a United Macedonia as part of such a federation was no longer realistic.

The emblem did not appear on the country's first passports. In 2007, however, the national emblem was put on the front and the inside of the new biometric Macedonian passports. According to the provisions of the Article 5, Section 2 of North Macedonia's constitution, the two-thirds majority is required to pass a law on the new symbols of the Republic. The usage of the coat of arms has been defined by law. In November 2009, the Macedonian parliament passed the Law on the Coat of Arms of the Republic of Macedonia. The law was passed with 80 votes in favor and 18 against. The five-pointed socialist star was scrapped from the top of the emblem.

Emblem of the People's Republic of Macedonia, July to December 1946

Emblem of the Socialist Republic of Macedonia, 1946 to 1991

Emblem of the Republic of Macedonia, 1991 to 2009

== Proposed heraldic replacements ==
Between the 16th and the 19th centuries foreign armorials commonly represented the region of Macedonia by means of a golden lion on a red field, or of a red lion on a golden field.

A proposal by architect and graphic designer Miroslav Grčev was put forward in 1992 to replace the emblem with a revised version of the historical gold lion on a red shield. The Macedonian Heraldry Society considers that coat of arms to have been the best solution for a new state emblem. However, this was rejected on three main grounds:

- Several political parties, notably VMRO-DPMNE, already use that emblem as their party symbols;
- Albanian political parties of Macedonia considered the proposal to be only representative for the ethnic Macedonians, but not also for ethnic Albanians;
- The state coat of arms of Bulgaria is identical to the Macedonian proposal save for the design of the crown.

As a result, the political parties agreed to continue to use the current emblem.

On December 5, 2014, the Macedonian government proposed a heraldic design to replace the national emblem. According to the Macedonian Heraldry Society, the proposed coat of arms was based on an illustration from Jerome de Bara book "Coat of Arms" (1581). The illustration from de Bara's book "Le blason des armoiries" depicts a coat of arms attributed to Alexander the Great. It is blazoned as "Or, a lion gules" (on a golden background, a red lion) and topped with a golden mural crown to represent the republican form of government.

First unofficial proposal for a new coat of arms

Second unofficial proposal for a new coat of arms

Coat of arms proposed in 2014 by the Macedonian government

Coat of arms proposed in 1992, by Miroslav Grčev. This was the most popular proposed arms before the government's 2014 proposal.

== See also ==
- Flag of North Macedonia
- Emblems of the Yugoslav Socialist Republics
- National symbols of North Macedonia
