= Order of Merit for North Macedonia =

Awarded by the President of North Macedonia
- Type: Single grade order
- Established: 27 June 2002
- Country: North Macedonia
- Ribbon
- Eligibility: All
- Status: Currently awarded

Statistics
- Total inductees: 34

Precedence
- Next (higher): Order "Ilinden-1903"
- Next (lower): Order of Military Merits

The Order of Merit for North Macedonia (Macedonian: Орден за заслуги за Северна Македонија, romanized: Orden za zaslugi za Severna Makedonija) is the fourth highest state recognition of North Macedonia. As its name implies, it is recognition of merit.

== Notable recipients ==
- 2006-Petre M. Andreevski
- 2007-Mateja Matevski
- 2007-Cvetan Grozdanov
- 2009-Simon Trpceski
- 2010-Esma Redzepova
- 2011-Otto von Habsburg
- 2011-Struga Poetry Evenings
- 2011-Liana Dumitrescu
- 2011-South East European University
- 2011-Peace Corps United States
- 2011-Tose Proeski
- 2014-Macedonian Radio Television
- 2021-Remzi Nesimi, Goran Stefanovski, Zafir Hadžimanov, Zhivko Mukaetov
