= Todor Skalovski =

Macedonian composer, choir and orchestra conductor

- Todor Skalovski
- Born: 21 January 1909; Tetovo, Ottoman Empire
- Died: 1 July 2004 (aged 95); Skopje, Macedonia
- Occupations: Composer and conductor

Todor Skalovski (Macedonian: Тодор Скаловски, 21 January 1909 – 1 July 2004) was a Macedonian composer, chorus and orchestra conductor who wrote the music to North Macedonia's national anthem "Denes nad Makedonija" (English: "Today over Macedonia"). He is regarded as one of the most distinguished composers there. Skalovski is also regarded as one of the trailblazers in composing music inspired by and incorporating Macedonian culture and mythology.

== Biography ==
Todor Skalovski was born in Tetovo (Kalkandelen) on 21 January 1909 in a family of merchants. In his youth, he took an interest in music. He studied at Belgrade's music academy. In the 1940s, he composed "Denes nad Makedonija", the current national anthem of North Macedonia. In 1944, he founded the Macedonian Philharmonic Association and directed the first opera performance in Skopje, Caveleria Rusticana. He died in Skopje in 2004.
