= Denes nad Makedonija =

National anthem of North Macedonia

English: Today over Macedonia
- Денес над Македонија
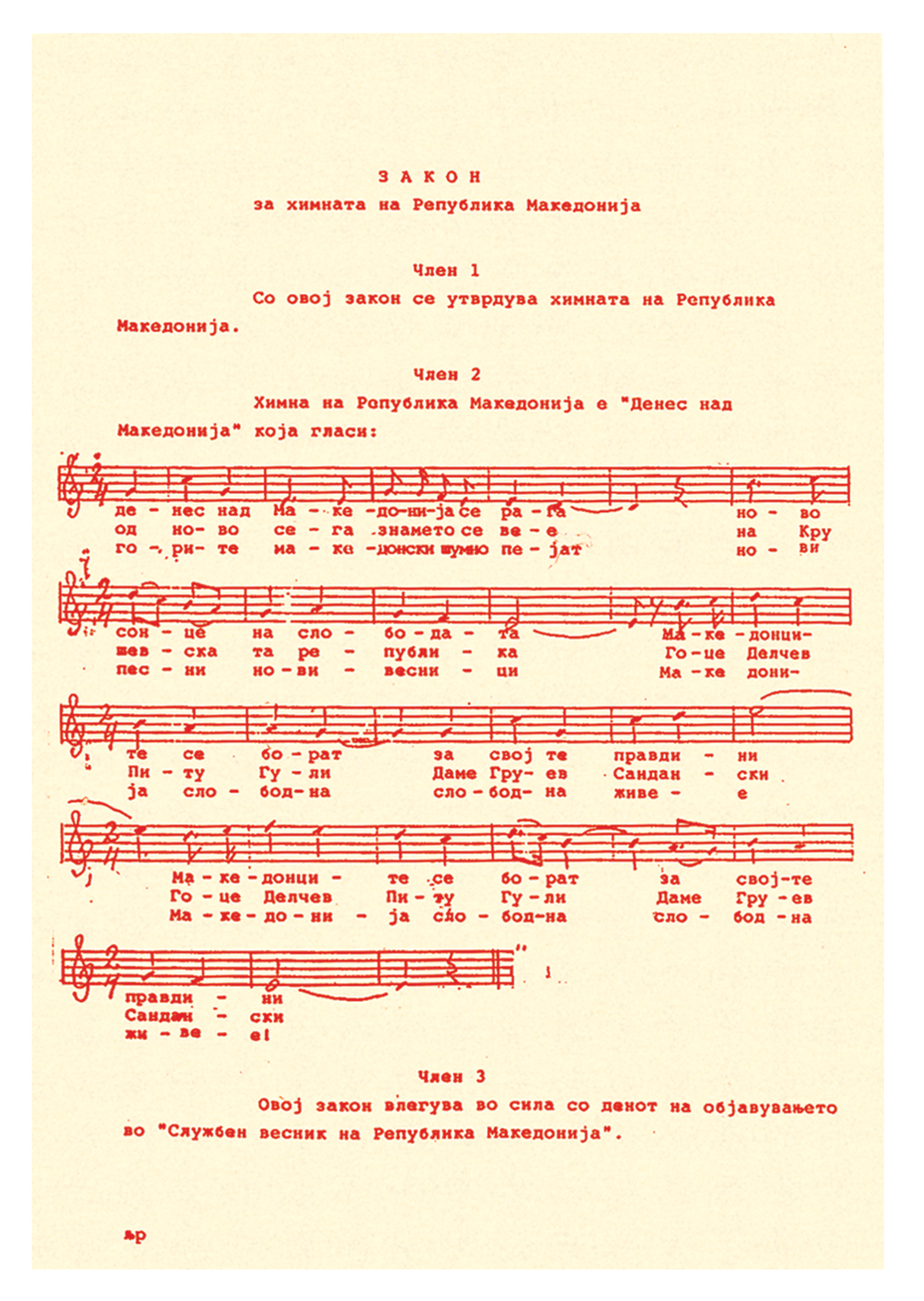
- The law which adopted "Denes nad Makedonija" as the national anthem.
- National anthem of North Macedonia
- Lyrics: Vlado Maleski, 1941
- Music: Todor Skalovski
- Published: 1943
- Adopted: 14 April 1989
- Readopted: 11 August 1992
- Relinquished: 8 September 1991 (by the Socialist Republic of Macedonia)

Audio sample
- U.S. Navy Band instrumental version (one verse): file; help

"Denes nad Makedonija" (Macedonian: Денес над Македонија, pronounced [ˈdɛnɛs nat makɛˈdɔnija]; lit. 'Today over Macedonia') is the national anthem of North Macedonia. Todor Skalovski composed the music and Vlado Maleski wrote the lyrics of the song in the early 1940s. It was adopted as the national anthem in 1992, almost a year after the state's independence from Yugoslavia. Before its adoption as a national anthem, it was used as the regional anthem of the Socialist Republic of Macedonia, a constituent state of Yugoslavia, before it became the national anthem of the Republic of North Macedonia.

== History ==
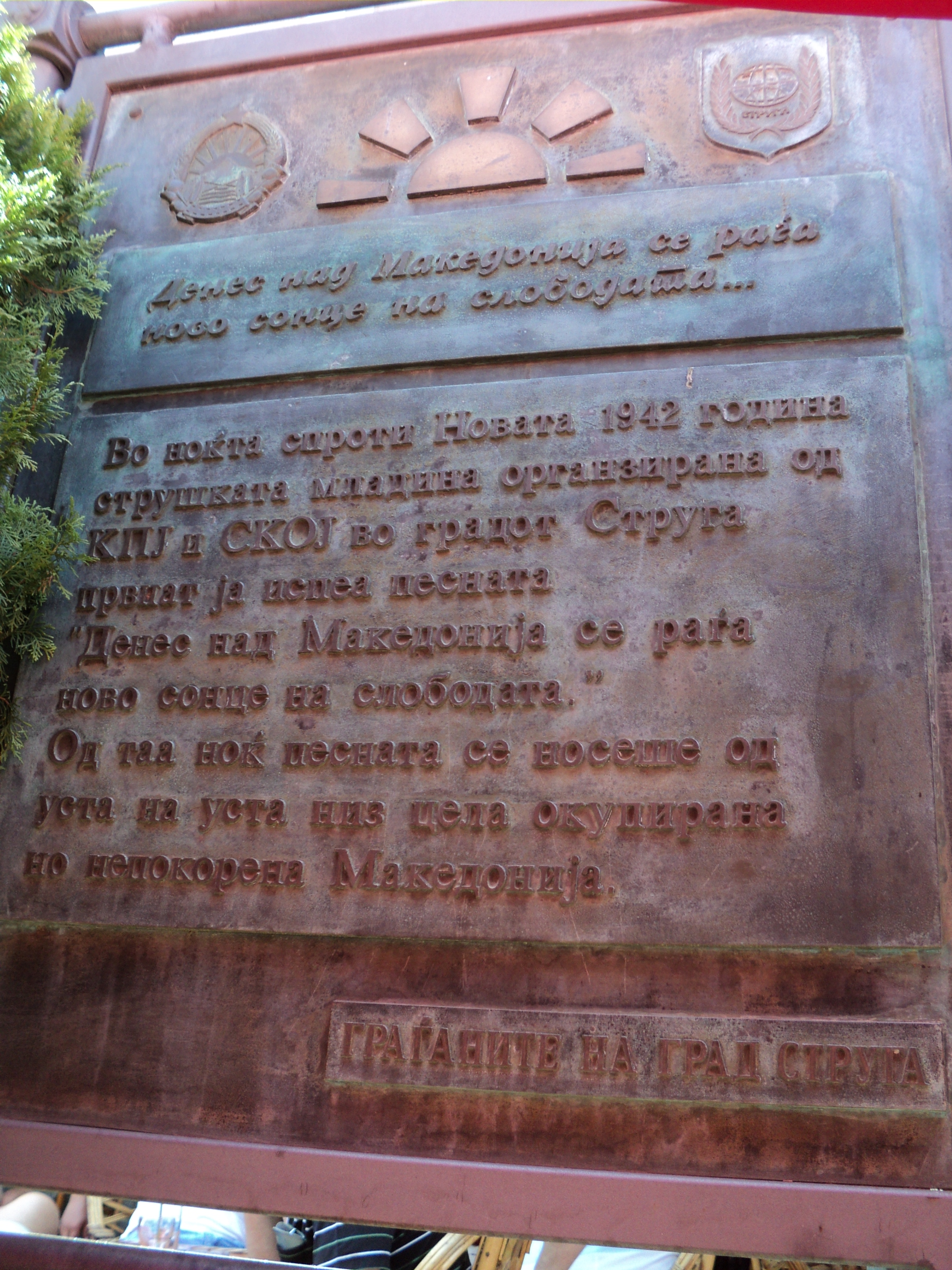
A monument in Struga dedicated to "Denes nad Makedonija"

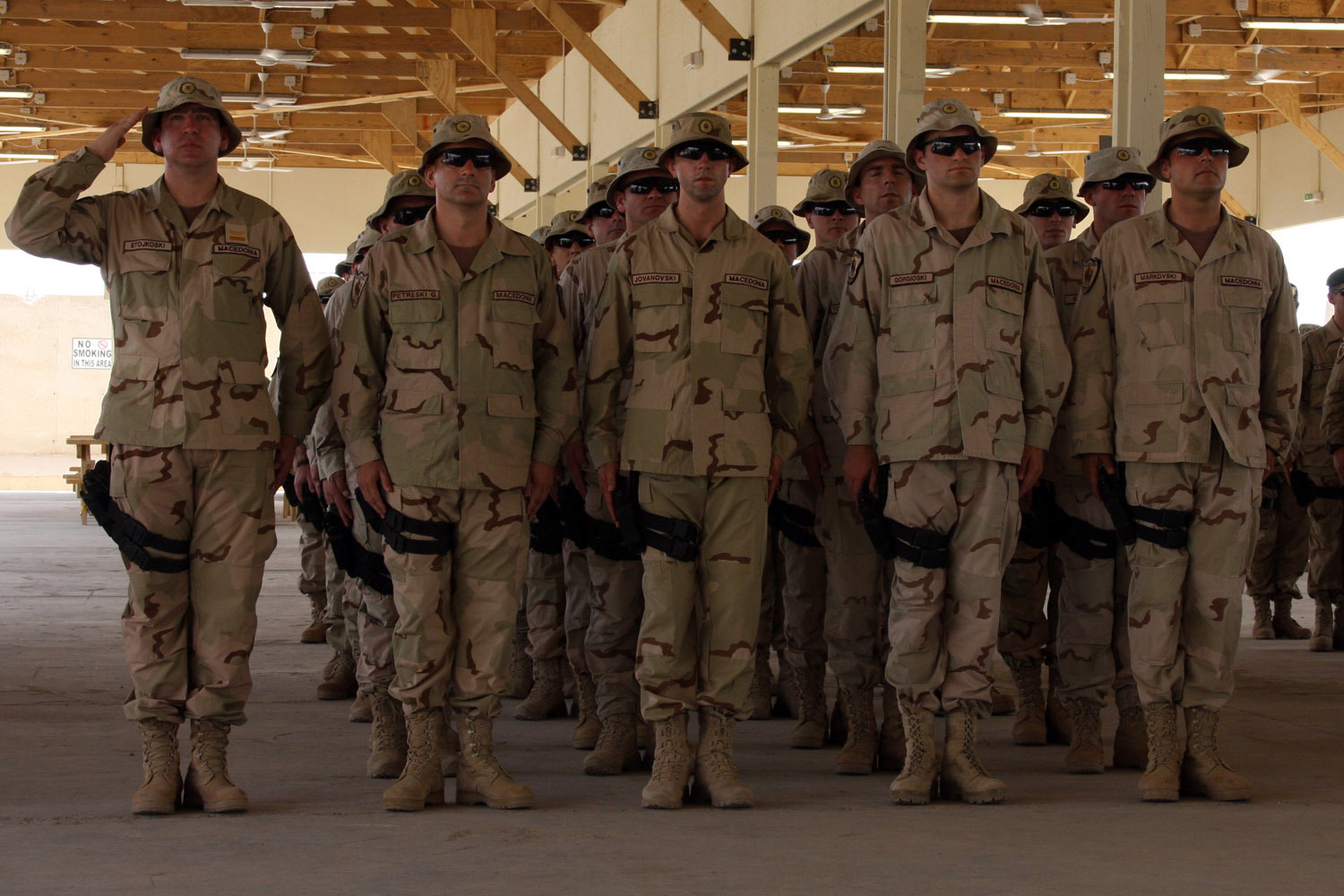
A Macedonian soldier saluting on behalf of his subordinates during a performance of the anthem at Camp Taji in 2008

The lyrics of "Denes nad Makedonija" were penned by Vlado Maleski in 1941, a writer who was active in the Macedonian Partisan movement during World War II. The musical portion was composed by Todor Skalovski. The song was first played in 1941 in Struga, among partisan and communist circles. According to oral recounts, the song was performed by Maleski himself on New Year's Eve in the presence of 24 youths, whose identities were subsequently documented in writing only in 1981. Even though the resistance consisted of fighters from the different ethnic groups across Yugoslavia, the aforementioned youths are believed to have all identified as Macedonians. The names of Goce Delčev, Pitu Guli, Nikola Karev, Jane Sandanski and Dimitar Vlahov were referred to because they advocated for an independent Macedonia and were against Bulgarian irredentism. Per academics Aleksandar Pavković and Christopher Kellen, they essentially had the same cause as the partisans in the National Liberation Struggle. From the end of the war, it was utilized – albeit unofficially – as the regional anthem of the Socialist Republic of Macedonia (which was part of Yugoslavia at the time) until 1989. In June 1943, the song was published in a collection of Macedonian national liberation songs, edited by Kočo Racin.

During the Informbiro period, a small change was made in the lyrics. In the new version, the names of Karev and Vlahov were removed and that of Dame Gruev was added. There is no official explanation for the changes in the lyrics, although it has been debated. On 14 April 1989, the socialist republic's Assembly amended the Constitution of 1974, expressly affirming "Denes nad Makedonija" as its official regional anthem. However, this change was short-lived, as the Assembly declared Macedonia's sovereignty two years later in January. Macedonia's independence was approved on 8 September 1991 in a referendum that saw Macedonians vote overwhelmingly in favor of independence.

Soon after independence, the Macedonian national legislature held a contest to determine a national anthem for the state. "Denes nad Makedonija" was one of several candidates in contention – the others in the running were "Himna" (English: "Anthem", lit. 'Hymn') by Taki Hrisik and "Da ni bideš večna" (English: "That You Should be Eternal") by Aleksandar Džambazov – and ended up finishing runner-up in the final results. Despite this, most members of the Assembly Commission voted to make it the national anthem of the state, and it was duly adopted on 11 August 1992. A deputy had proposed restoring the name of Karev in the lyrics, whose proposal was declined. The Albanian political parties did not support the anthem on the basis that it favored one ethnic group and excluded the others.

=== Legal protection and reception ===
Macedonia's Sobranie (legislative chamber) passed legislation titled "The Law on the Anthem of the Republic of Macedonia" on 11 August 1992. This officially adopted "Denes nad Makedonija" as the national anthem of the country, with Article 2 specifically confirming the song's status as such. However, it did not stipulate which stanzas should be recognized as official. Article 5 of the country's constitution requires laws regarding national symbols to be approved by a two-thirds majority. Although 88 out of the 120 members of the Assembly voted for it, Albanian representatives were not involved.

In the 2011 IPSOS survey, 84.8% of the respondents said that they liked the anthem, while 15.2% said they did not. Ethnically, 54% of the Albanian respondents said they did not like it and 46% said they did, while 97% of the Macedonian respondents said that they liked it.

== Lyrics ==
"Denes nad Makedonija", as originally written, consists of four stanzas. North Macedonia's law does not exactly specify which stanzas officially constitute the national anthem. However, the second stanza is often omitted from the lyrics of the national anthem that are posted on North Macedonia's government websites.

The lyrics of "Denes nad Makedonija" are reflective of a military marching song, which is fitting given its connection to the Yugoslav Macedonian theatre of the Second World War. They are not a call to arms for Macedonians; instead, the hymn uses imagery to take the person singing it back to the time the anthem was written and purports that they themselves were engaging in combat at the time. The lyrics previously alluded to the concepts of mothers and motherhood (specifically in the second stanza). This is in line with the national anthems – both past and present – of other Southeast European countries like Bosnia and Herzegovina ("Jedna si jedina"), Croatia ("Horvatska domovina"), and Montenegro ("Oj, svijetla majska zoro"). It discussed how mothers mourn for their fallen sons, who died fighting for the rights and liberty of their country. They are comforted for their loss by being reminded of the bravery of their sons and the nobleness of the cause for which they died. Although this theme has been described as a "standard anthemic device", it was subsequently expunged from the official words of the state anthem. The lyrics which also mention the inter-generational and inter-gender unity in the fight for rights are omitted.

Official Macedonian lyrics

Денес над Македонија се раѓа,
ново сонце на слободата!
𝄆 Македонците се борат,
за своите правдини! 𝄇

Не плачи Македонијо мајко мила,
Крени глава гордо, високо,
𝄆 Старо, младо, машко и женско,
На нозе се кренало! 𝄇 (Note: The second stanza is often omitted.)

Одново сега знамето се вее,
на Крушевската Република!
𝄆 Гоце Делчев, Питу Гули,
Даме Груев, Сандански! 𝄇

Горите македонски шумно пеат,
нови песни, нови весници!
𝄆 Македонија слободна,
слободно живее! 𝄇

Romanization of Macedonian

Denes nad Makedonija se raǵa,
novo sonce na slobodata!
𝄆 Makedoncite se borat,
za svoite pravdini! 𝄇

Ne plači Makedonijo majko mila,
Kreni glava gordo, visoko,
𝄆 Staro, mlado, maško i žensko,
Na noze se krenalo! 𝄇

Odnovo sega znameto se vee,
na Kruševskata Republika!
𝄆 Goce Delčev, Pitu Guli,
Dame Gruev, Sandanski! 𝄇

Gorite Makedonski šumno peat,
novi pesni, novi vesnici!
𝄆 Makedonija slobodna,
slobodno živee! 𝄇

IPA transcription (Note: See Help:IPA/Macedonian and Macedonian phonology.)

[ˈd̪ɛ.n̪ɛs̪ n̪ad̪ ma.kɛ.ˈd̪ɔ.n̪i.ja s̪ɛ ˈra.ɟa |]
[ˈnɔ.vɔ ˈs̪ɔn̪.t̪͡s̪ɛ n̪a s̪ɫ̪ɔ.ˈbɔ.d̪a.t̪a ‖]
𝄆 [ma.kɛ.ˈd̪ɔn̪.t̪͡s̪i.t̪ɛ s̪ɛ ˈbɔ.rat̪ |]
[z̪a ˈs̪vɔi̯.t̪ɛ ˈprav.d̪i.n̪i ‖] 𝄇

[n̪ɛ ˈpɫ̪a.t͡ʃi ma.kɛ.ˈd̪ɔ.n̪jɔ ˈmaj.kɔ ˈmi.ɫ̪a |]
[ˈkrɛ.n̪i ˈgɫ̪a.va ˈgɔr.d̪ɔ | ˈvi.s̪ɔ.kɔ |]
𝄆 [ˈs̪t̪a.rɔ | ˈmɫ̪a.d̪ɔ | ˈmaʃ.kɔ‿i ˈʒɛn̪.s̪kɔ |]
[n̪a ˈn̪ɔ.z̪ɛ s̪ɛ ˈkrɛ.n̪a.ɫ̪ɔ ‖] 𝄇

[ˈɔd̪.n̪ɔ.vɔ ˈs̪ɛ.ga ˈz̪n̪a.mɛ.t̪ɔ s̪ɛ ˈvɛ.ɛ ǀ]
[n̪a kru.ˈʃɛf.s̪ka.t̪a rɛ.ˈpub.l̪i.ka ǁ]
𝄆 [ˈgɔ.t̪͡s̪ɛ ˈd̪ɛɫ̪.t͡ʃɛf ǀ ˈpi.t̪u ˈgu.l̪i ǀ]
[ˈd̪a.mɛ ˈgru.ɛf ǀ ˈs̪an̪.d̪an̪.s̪ki ǁ] 𝄇

[ˈgɔ.ri.t̪ɛ ma.ˈkɛ.d̪ɔn̪.s̪ki ˈʃum.n̪ɔ ˈpɛ.at̪ ǀ]
[ˈn̪ɔ.vi ˈpɛs̪.n̪i ǀ ˈn̪ɔ.vi ˈvɛs̪.n̪i.t̪͡s̪i ǁ]
𝄆 [ma.kɛ.ˈd̪ɔ.n̪i.ja ˈs̪ɫ̪ɔ.bɔd̪.n̪a ǀ]
[ˈs̪ɫ̪ɔ.bɔd̪.n̪ɔ ˈʒi.vɛ.ɛ ǁ] 𝄇

Albanian translation

Sot mbi Maqedoninë ka lind,
dielli i ri i lirisë!
𝄆 Maqedonasit luftojnë
për të drejtat e veta! 𝄇

Mos qaj e dashura nënë Maqedoni,
ngrite kokën lart me krenari.
𝄆 Të vjetër, të rinj, burra dhe gra,
në këmbë janë ngritur! 𝄇

Përsëri po valëvitet flamuri,
mbi Republikën e Krushevës!
𝄆 Goce Dellçev, Pitu Guli,
Dame Gruev, Sandanski! 𝄇

Pyjet Maqedonase këndojnë,
këngë të reja, lajme të reja!
Maqedonia e lirë,
e lirë jeton! 𝄇

English translation

Today over Macedonia is born
the new sun of liberty.
𝄆 The Macedonians fight
for their own rights! 𝄇

Do not cry, dear mother Macedonia,
Raise your head proudly high,
𝄆 Old, young, men, and women,
have risen to their feet! 𝄇

Now once again the flag flutters,
(that) of the Kruševo Republic
𝄆 Goce Delčev, Pitu Guli
Dame Gruev, Sandanski! 𝄇

The Macedonian woods resoundly sing
new songs and news!
𝄆 Macedonia liberated
lives in liberty! 𝄇

== See also ==
- March of the Macedonian Revolutionaries
